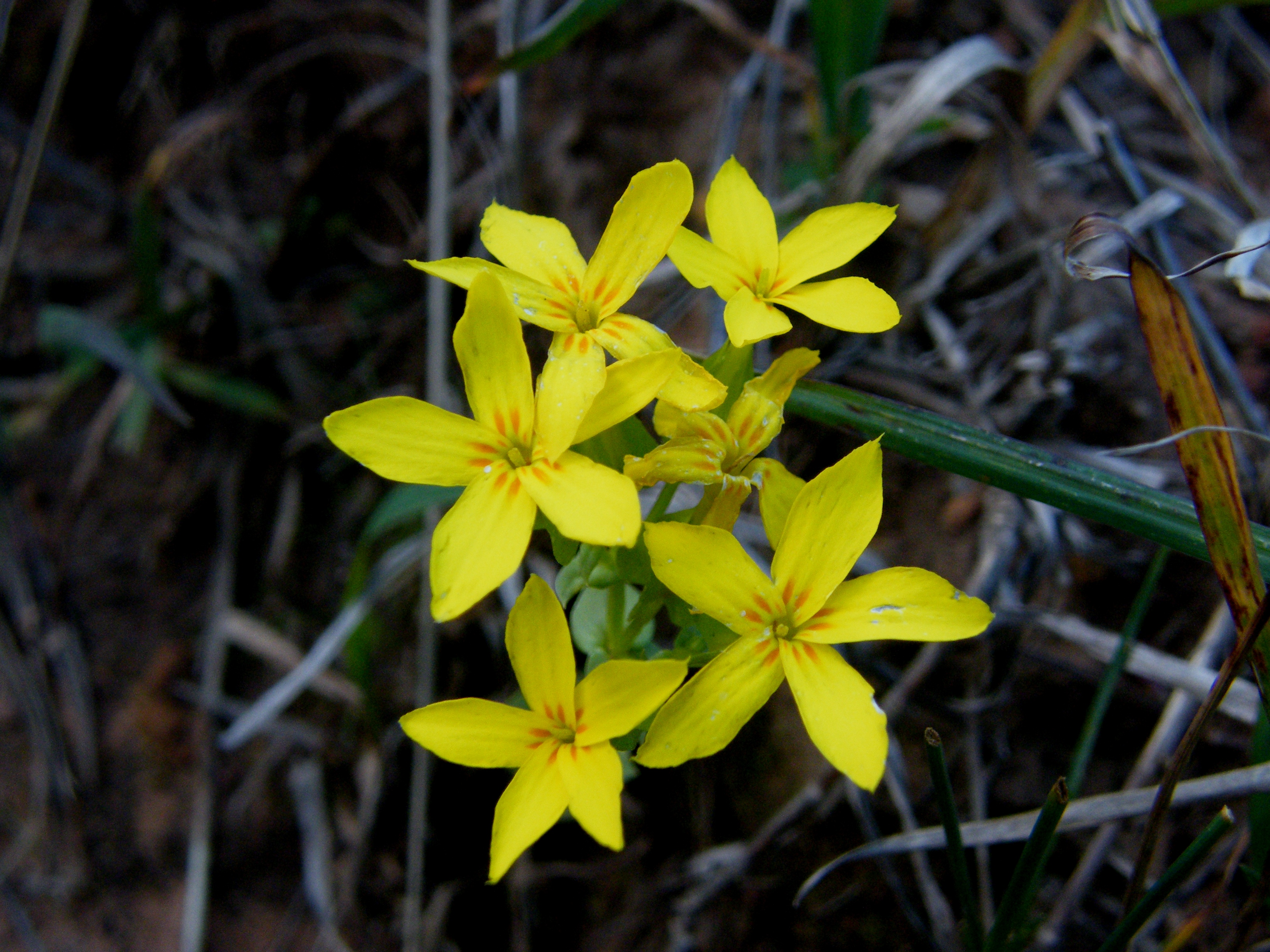
- Sabaea exacoides

Scientific classification
- Kingdom: Plantae
- Clade: Tracheophytes
- Clade: Angiosperms
- Clade: Eudicots
- Clade: Asterids
- Order: Gentianales
- Family: Gentianaceae
- Tribe: Exaceae
- Genus: Sebaea; Sol. ex R.Br.

Species
- See text

= Sebaea =

Genus of plants

Sebaea is a genus of annual plants in the family Gentianaceae. Species occur in Africa, Madagascar, India, China, Thailand, Australia and New Zealand. The genus was paraphyletic and has been split in four genera: Exochaenium, Klackenbergia, Lagenias and Sebaea s.str.. Synapomorphies for Sebaea s.str. include the presence of extra stigma along the style (called diplostigmaty) and the shape of the testa cells of the seeds.

The name honors Albertus Seba (1665–1736), a Dutch pharmacist, zoologist and collector.

Species include (non exhaustive list):

- Sebaea albens (L. f.) Roem. & Schult.
- Sebaea albidiflora F.Muell. - white sebaea
- Sebaea ambigua Cham.
- Sebaea amicorum I.M. Oliv. & Beyers
- Sebaea aurea (L. f.) Roem. & Schult.
- Sebaea bojeri Griseb.
- Sebaea brachyphylla Griseb.
- Sebaea capitata Cham. & Schlechtdl.
  - var. capitata Cham. & Schlechtdl.
  - var. sclerosepala (Schinz) Marais
- Sebaea chironioides Gilg
- Sebaea elongata E. Mey.
- Sebaea erosa Schinz
- Sebaea exacoides (L.) Schinz
- Sebaea exigua (Oliv.) Schinz
- Sebaea filiformis Schinz
- Sebaea fourcadei Marais
- Sebaea grisebachiana Schinz
- Sebaea hymenosepala Gilg
- Sebaea junodii Schinz
- Sebaea laxa N.E.Br.
- Sebaea leiostyla Gilg
- Sebaea longicaulis Schinz
- Sebaea macrophylla Gilg
- Sebaea marlothii Gilg
- Sebaea membranaceae Hill
- Sebaea microphylla (Edgew.) Knobl.
- Sebaea micrantha (Cham. & Schlechtdel.) Schinz
  - var. micrantha (Cham. & Schlechtdel.) Schinz
  - var. intermedia (Cham. & Schlechtdel.) Marais
- Sebaea minutiflora Schinz
- Sebaea minutissima Hilliard & B.L.Burtt
- Sebaea natalensis Schinz
- Sebaea ovata (Labill.) R. Br. - yellow sebaea, yellow centaury
- Sebaea pentendra E. Mey.
  - var. burchellii (Gilg) Marais
  - var. pentendra E. Mey.
- Sebaea pleurostigmatosa Hilliard & B.L. Burtt
- Sebaea procumbens A.W. Hill
- Sebaea radiata Hilliard & B.L.Burtt
- Sebaea ramosissima Gilg
- Sebaea rara W. Dod
- Sebaea rehmannii Schinz
- Sebaea repens Schinz
- Sebaea scabra Schinz
- Sebaea schlechteri Schinz
- Sebaea sedoides Gilg
  - var. confertiflora (Schinz) Marais
  - var. sedoides Gilg
  - var. schoenlandii (Schinz) Marais
- Sebaea solaris Kissling
- Sebaea spathulata Steud.
- Sebaea stricta (E. Mey.) Gilg
- Sebaea sulphurea Cham. & Schlechtdl.
- Sebaea thomasii Schinz
- Sebaea zeyheri Schinz
  - var. acutiloba (Schinz) Marais
  - var. cleistantha (R.A. Dyer) Marais
  - var. zeyheri Schinz
