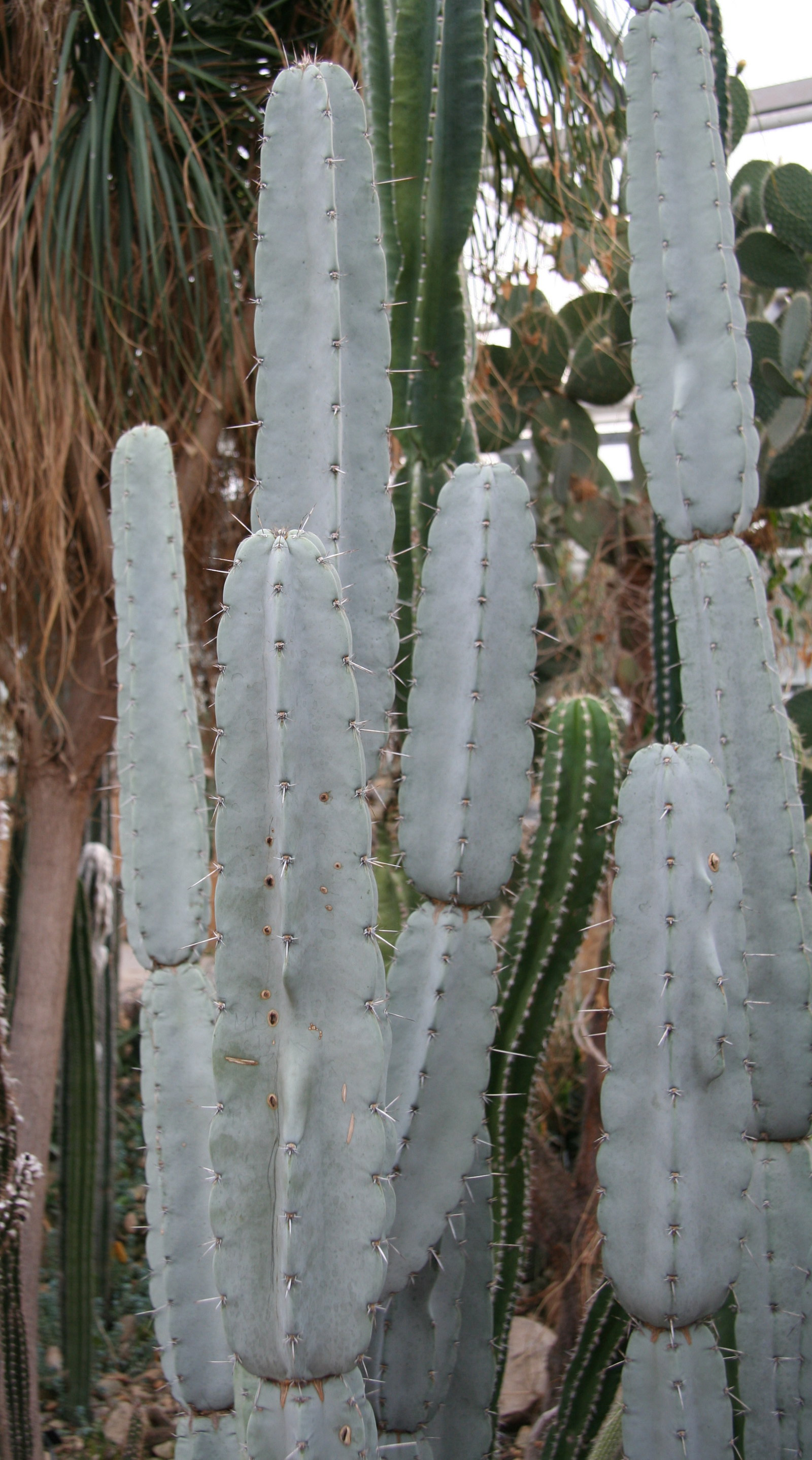

Conservation status
- Least Concern (IUCN 3.1)

Scientific classification
- Kingdom: Plantae
- Clade: Tracheophytes
- Clade: Angiosperms
- Clade: Eudicots
- Order: Caryophyllales
- Family: Cactaceae
- Subfamily: Cactoideae
- Genus: Armatocereus
- Species: A. laetus

Binomial name
- Armatocereus laetus (Kunth) Backeb. ex A.W. Hill 1991

Synonyms
- Cactus laetus Kunth in F.W.H.von Humboldt 1823; Cereus laetus (Kunth) DC. 1828; Lemaireocereus laetus (Kunth) Britton & Rose 1919; Armatocereus jungo Backeb. 1935; Armatocereus neolaetus Y.Itô 1981

= Armatocereus laetus =

Species of plant

Armatocereus laetus is a species of Armatocereus from Peru.

== Description ==
Armatocereus laetus grows columnar tree-like, branched above the ground and reaches growth heights of 4 to 6 meters. A short massive trunk is formed. The gray-green shoots are columnar and erect. Four to eight ribs are present. The six to twelve initially brown spines become whitish or grayish with age.

The white flowers are 7 to 8 centimeters long and up to 5 centimeters in diameter. The green fruits are heavily spined.

== Distribution ==
Armatocereus laetus is distributed in northern Peru and southern Ecuador.

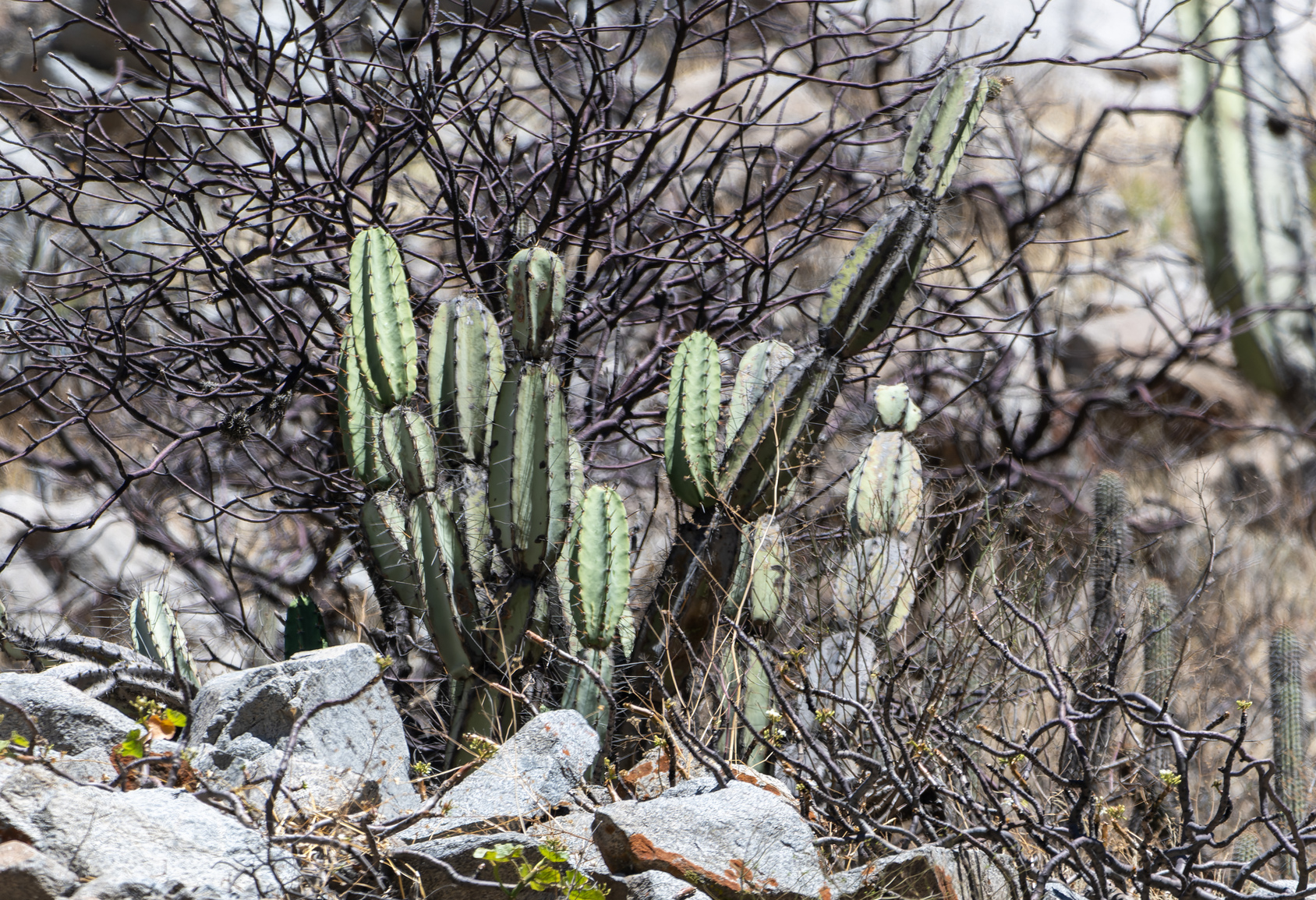
Plant growing in Cullahuasi, Peru

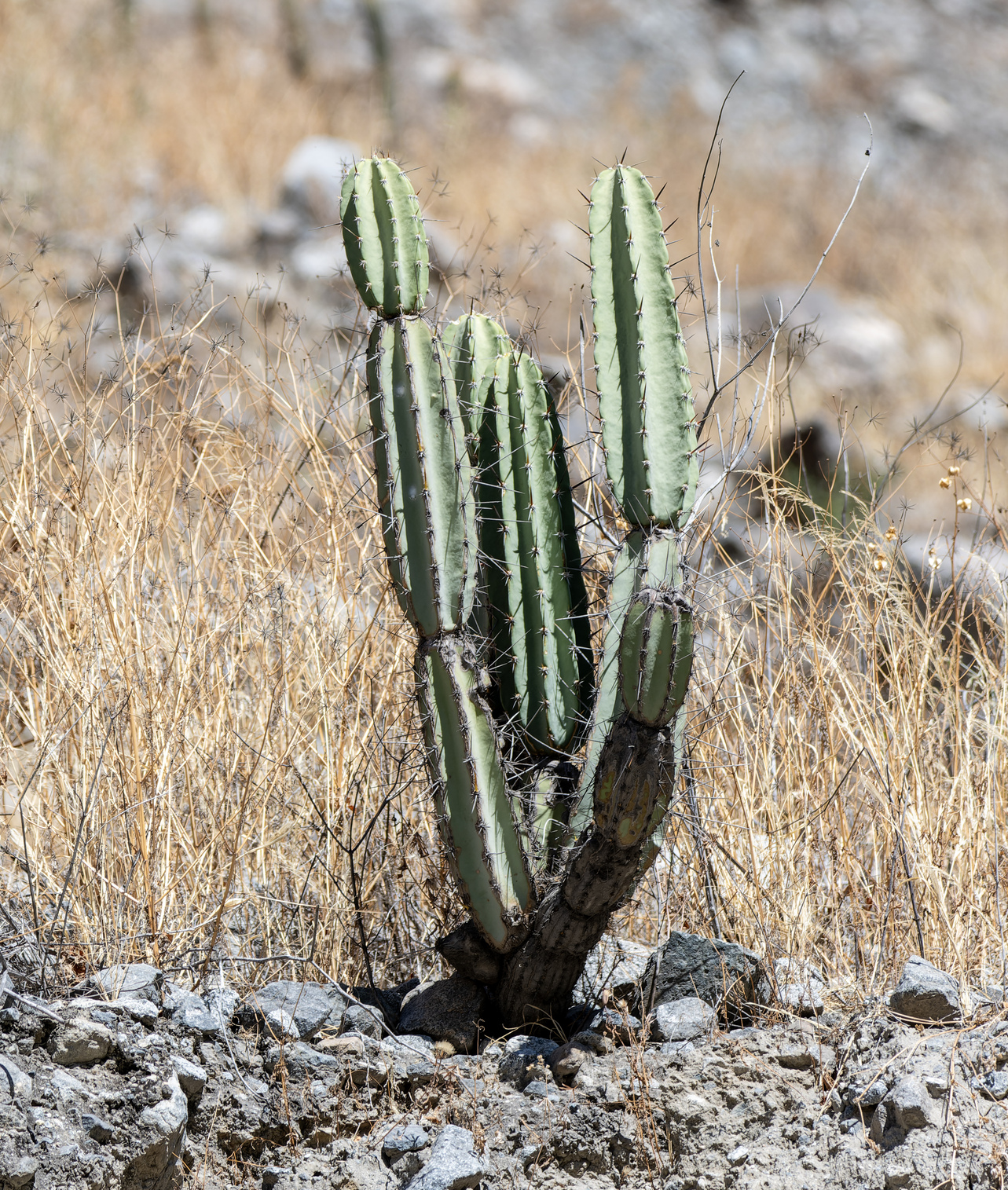

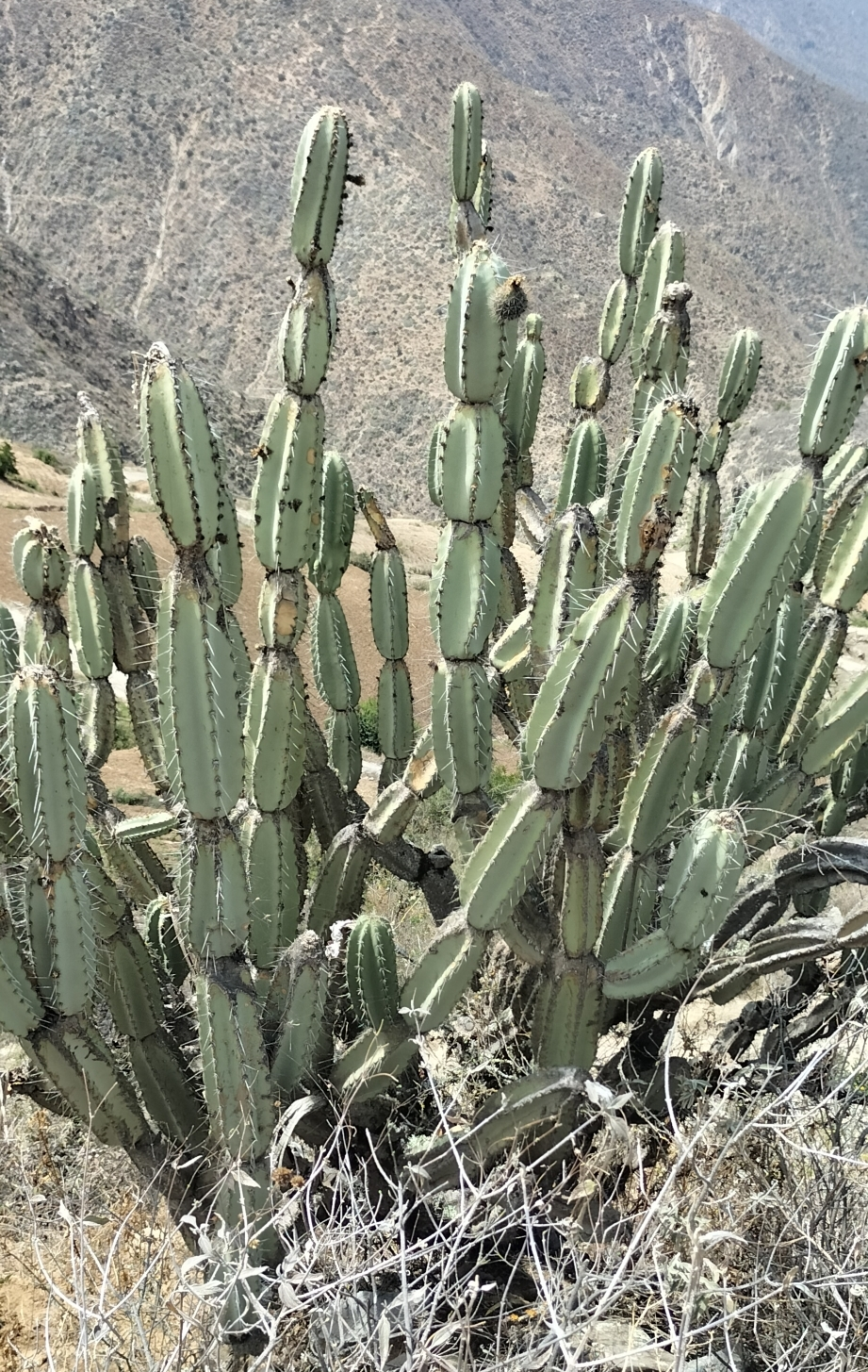
Plant in Guacapungo, Peru

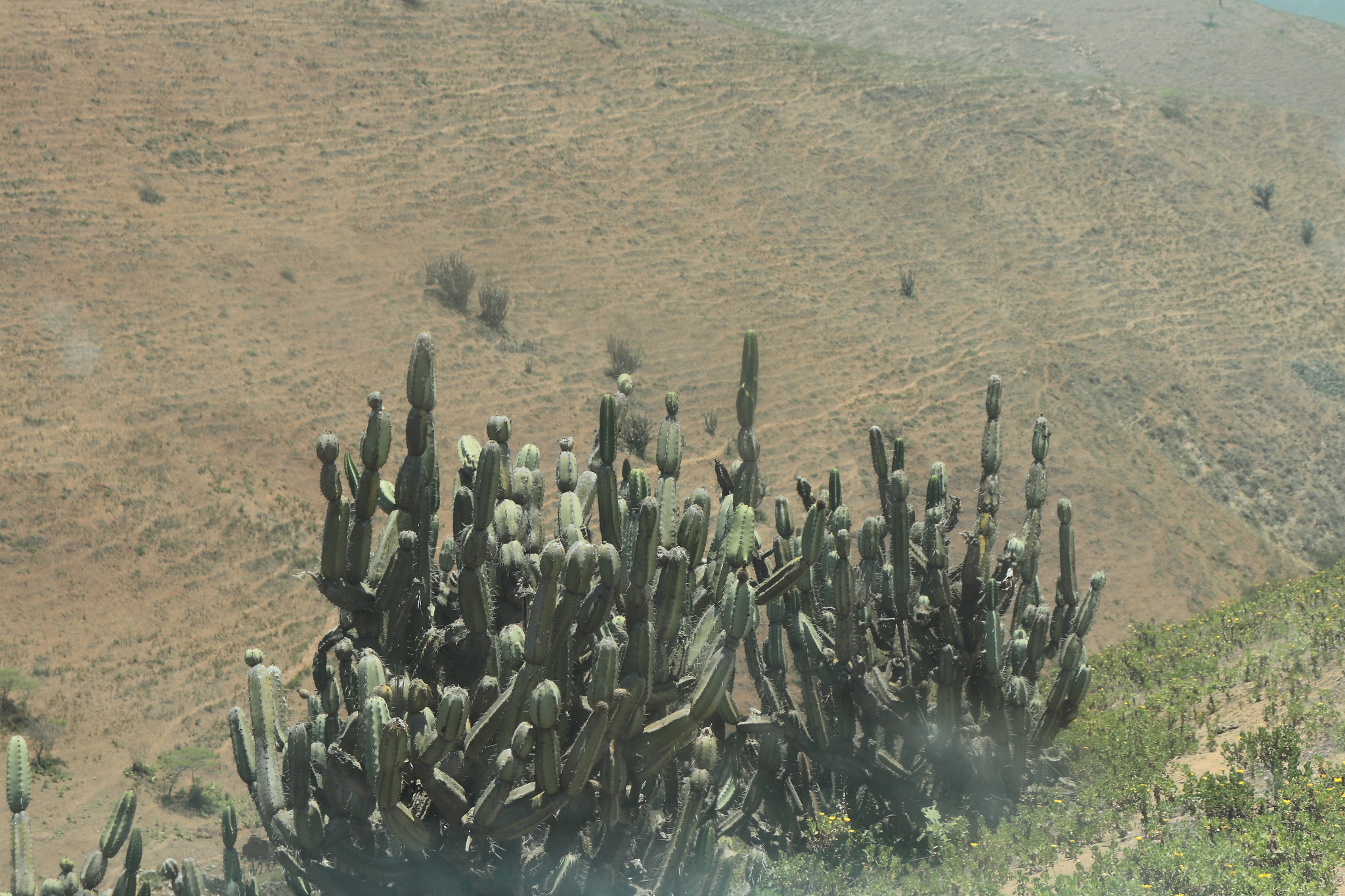
Habitat in Atiquipa, Peru

== Taxonomy ==
The first description as Cactus laetus was in 1923 by Karl Sigismund Kunth. Arthur William Hill placed the species in the genus Armatocereus in 1938. Other nomenclature synonyms include Cereus laetus (Kunth) DC. and Lemaireocereus laetus (Kunth) Britton & Rose (1919).
