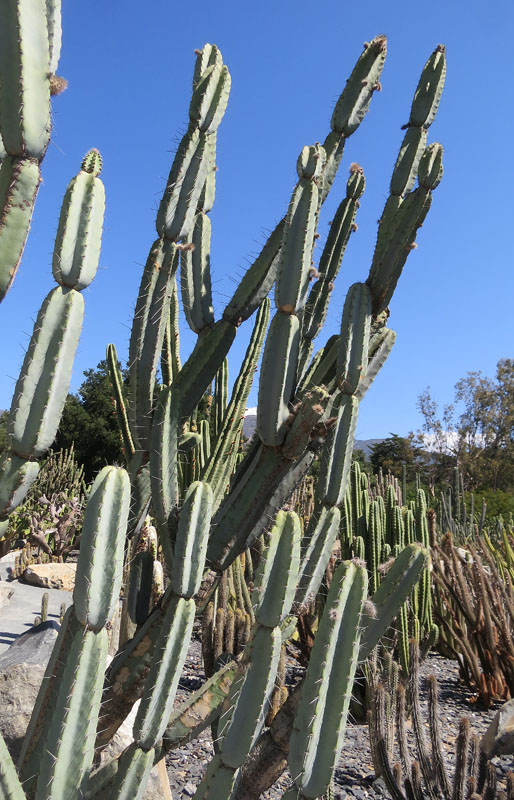

Conservation status
- Least Concern (IUCN 3.1)

Scientific classification
- Kingdom: Plantae
- Clade: Tracheophytes
- Clade: Angiosperms
- Clade: Eudicots
- Order: Caryophyllales
- Family: Cactaceae
- Subfamily: Cactoideae
- Genus: Armatocereus
- Species: A. matucanensis

Binomial name
- Armatocereus matucanensis Backeb. ex A.W. Hill 1938

= Armatocereus matucanensis =

Species of cactus

Armatocereus matucanensis is a species of Armatocereus from Ecuador and Peru.

== Description ==
Armatocereus matucanensis grows like a tree, branches out from the base in particular and reaches heights of growth of up to 6 metres. A strong trunk is usually formed. The upright, often lump-forming, grey-green, bluish-tinted shoots are divided into 30 to 50 cm (12 to 20 in) long segments with a diameter of 7 to 13 cm (2.8 to 5.1 in). There are five to eight ribs separated by shallow furrows. The primrose, angular, flattened and slightly twisted brown spines later turn gray and have a darker tip. The one to four central spines have a length of three to seven centimeters. The 8 to 14 spread radial spines are 5 to 15 mm (0.20 to 0.59 in) long.

The narrow, funnel-shaped, white flowers stand out horizontally or are erect. They are up to 10 cm (3.9 in) long and have a diameter of 6 cm (2.4 in). The ovoid fruits are green. They are 8 to 13 cm (3.1 to 5.1 in) long.

== Distribution ==
Armatocereus matucanensis is found in Ecuador in the province of Loja and the Peruvian region of Lima.

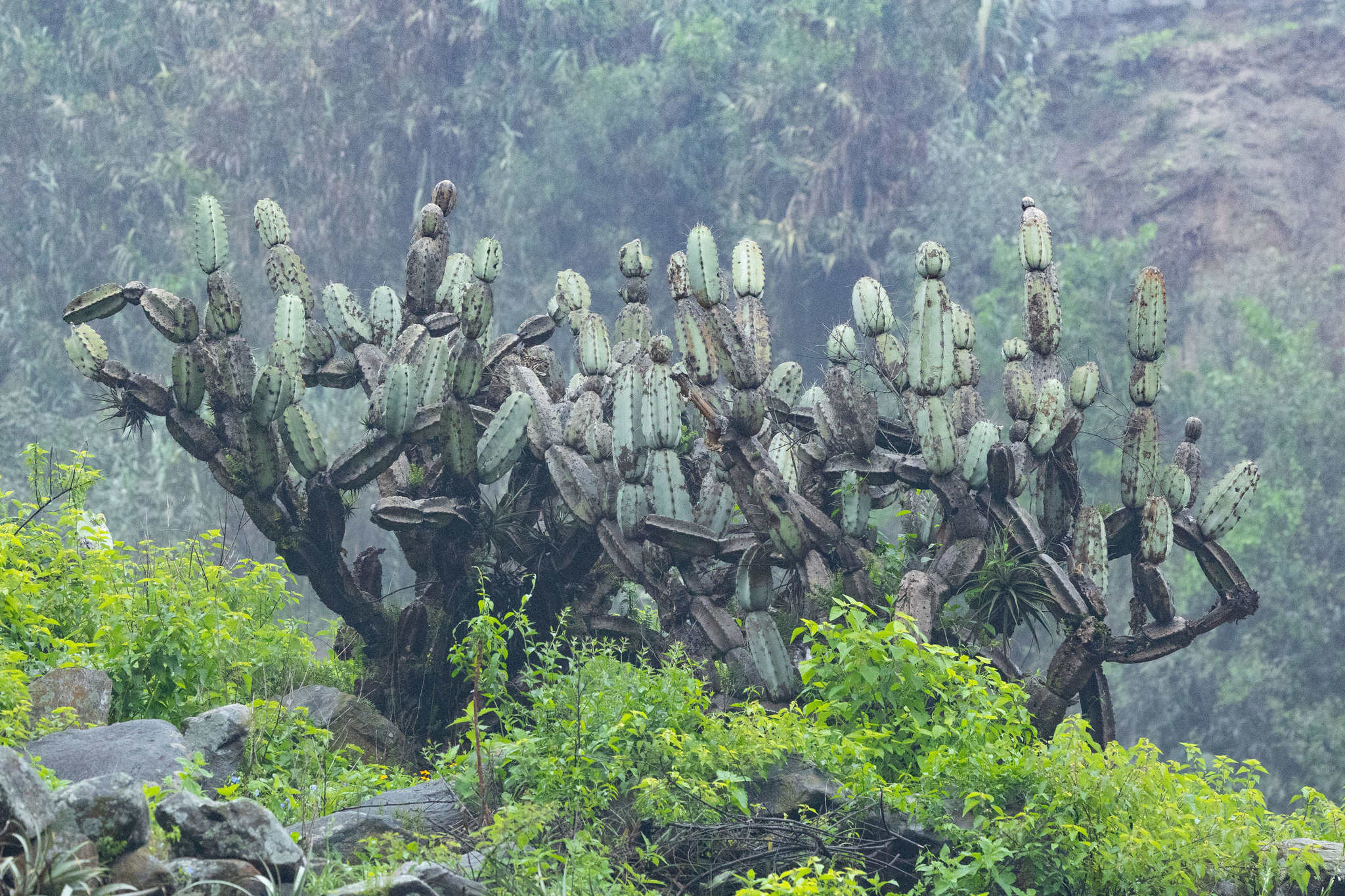
Habitat in Surco, Peru

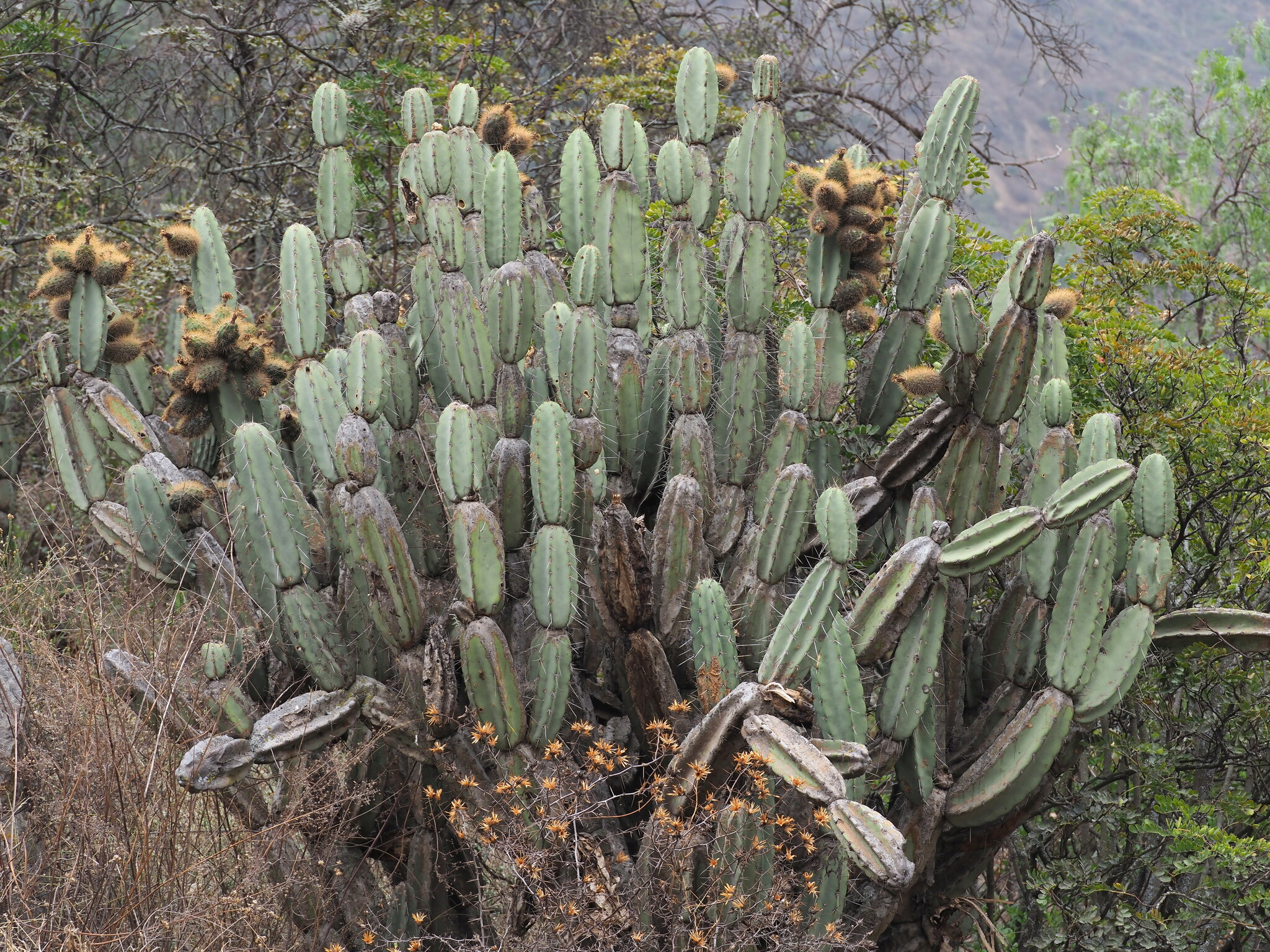
Habitat in San José, Peru

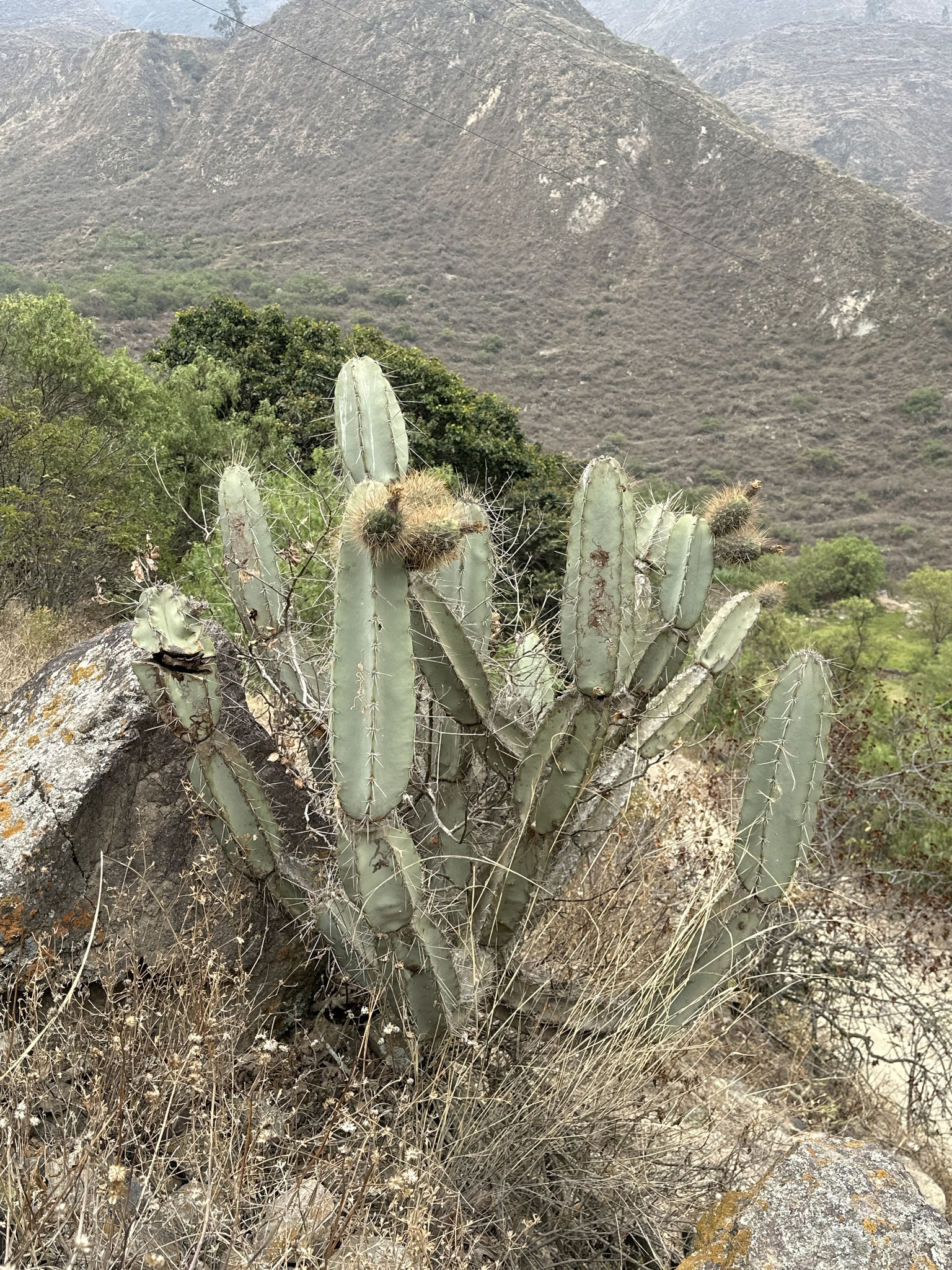
Plant growing in San José, Peru

== Taxonomy ==
The first description was in 1938 by Arthur William Hill. A nomenclature synonym is Lemaireocereus matucanensis (Backeb. ex A.W.Hill) W.T.Marshall (1941).
