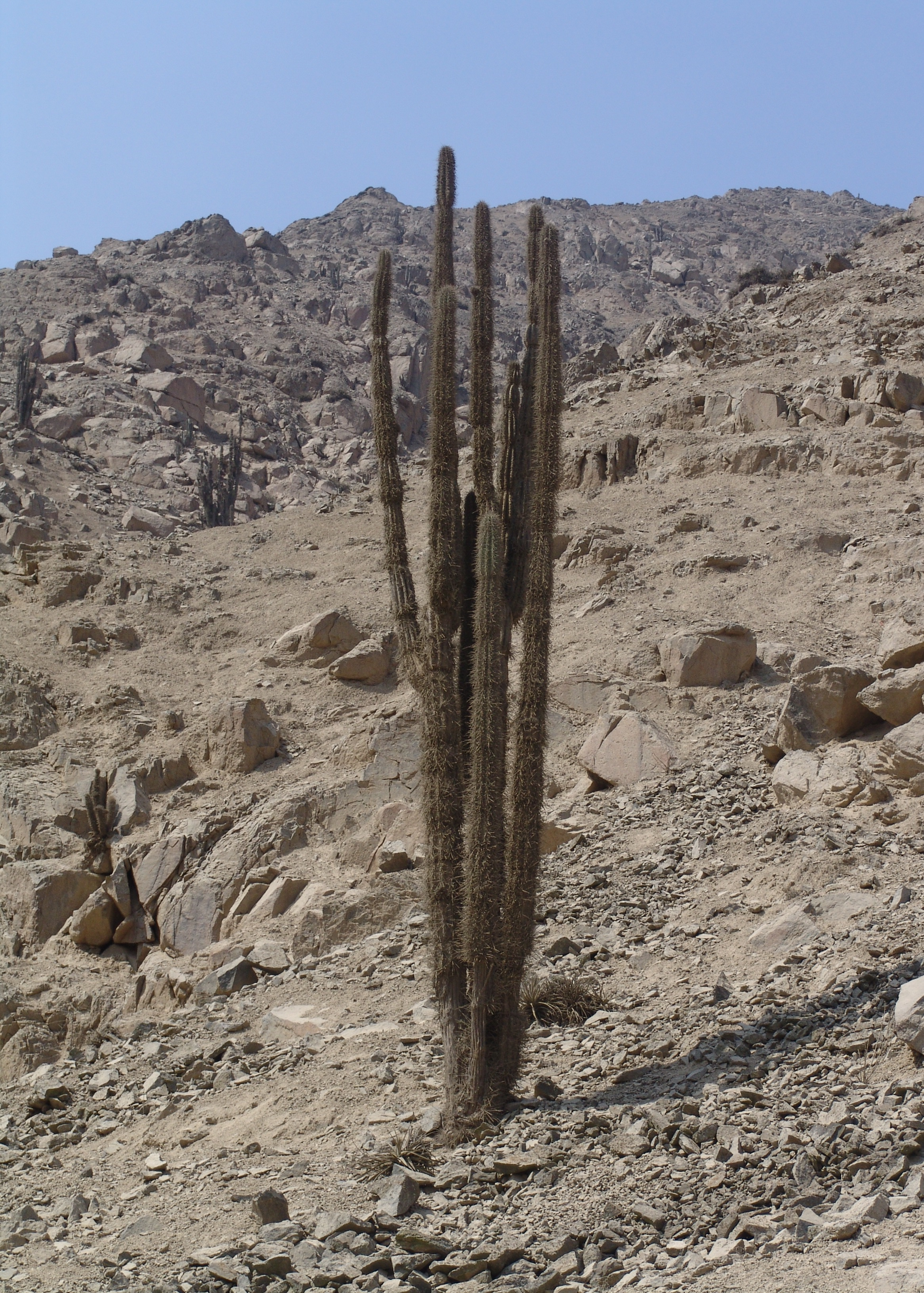

Conservation status
- Least Concern (IUCN 3.1)

Scientific classification
- Kingdom: Plantae
- Clade: Tracheophytes
- Clade: Angiosperms
- Clade: Eudicots
- Order: Caryophyllales
- Family: Cactaceae
- Subfamily: Cactoideae
- Genus: Armatocereus
- Species: A. procerus

Binomial name
- Armatocereus procerus Rauh & Backeb 1956 publ. 1957

= Armatocereus procerus =

Species of cactus

Armatocereus procerus is a species of Armatocereus found in southern Peru.

== Description ==
Armatocereus procerus grows like a tree, usually has no clear trunk and reaches a height of up to 7 meters. The upright dark green or grey-green shoots are clearly divided into segments. There are eight to ten ribs on which there are large areoles. The one to four yellowish central spines have a darker tip and are up to 10 cm (3.9 in) long. The 15 to 20 radial spines are each up to 2 cm (0.79 in) long.

The white flowers are up to 7 cm (2.8 in) long and have a diameter of 5 cm (2.0 in). The fruits are green, and up to 7 cm (2.8 in) long.

== Distribution ==
Armatocereus procerus is distributed in the Peruvian regions of Ancash, Lima and Ica.

In the IUCN Red List of Threatened Species, the species is listed as "Least Concern (LC)".

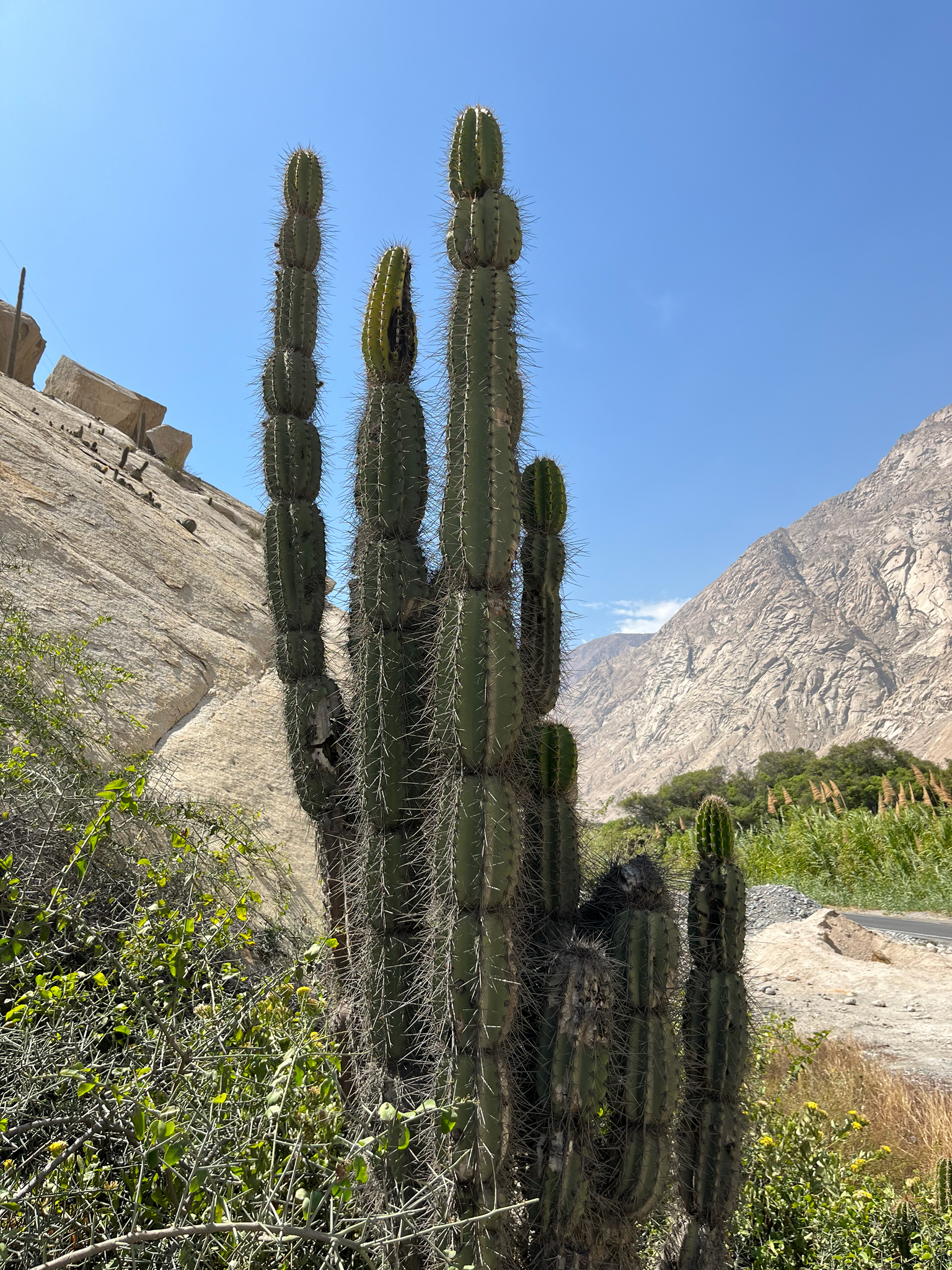
Plant growing in Ancash, Peru

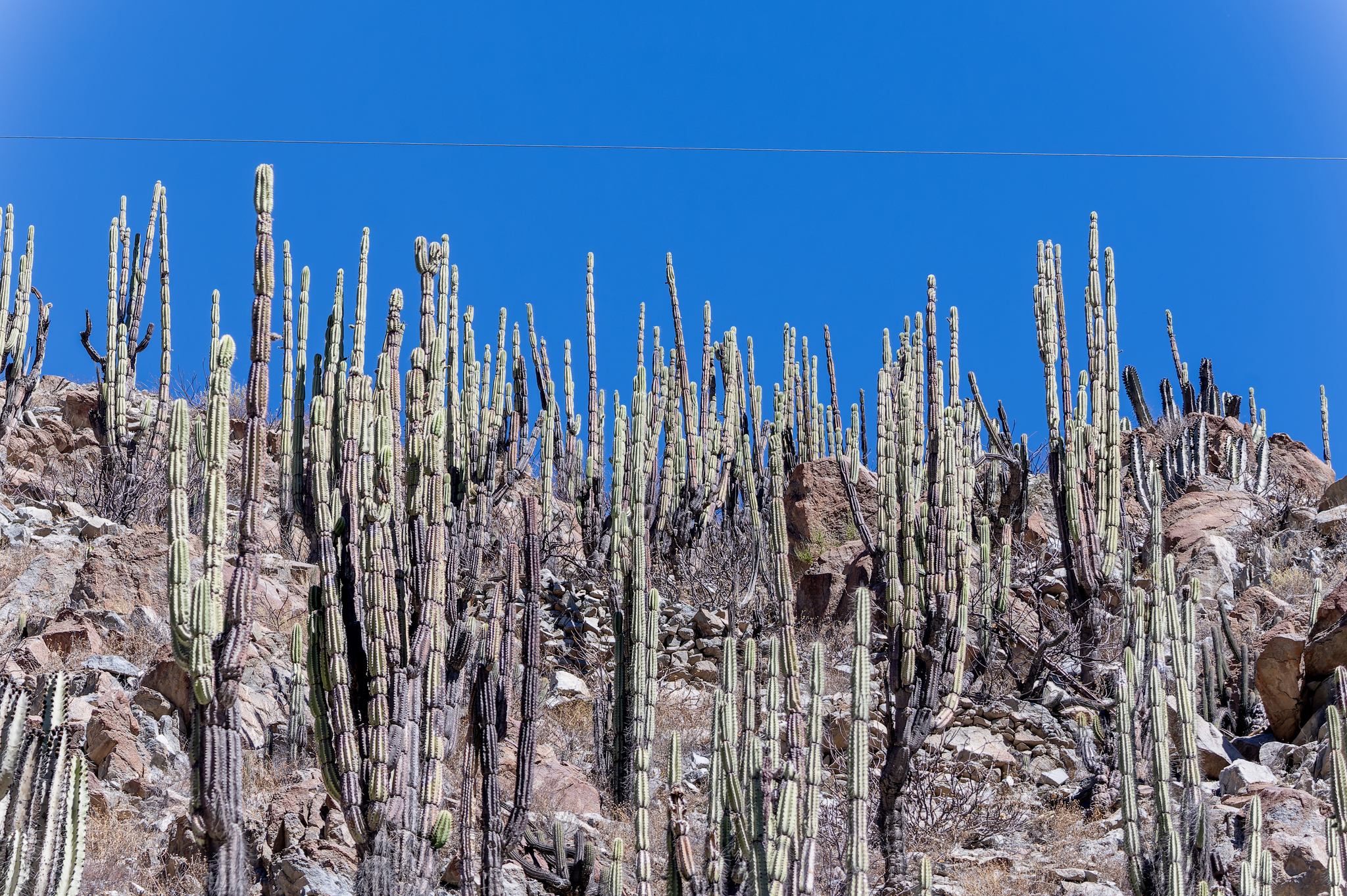
Habitat in Cullahuasi, Peru

== Taxonomy ==
The first description by Werner Rauh and Curt Backeberg was published in 1956.
