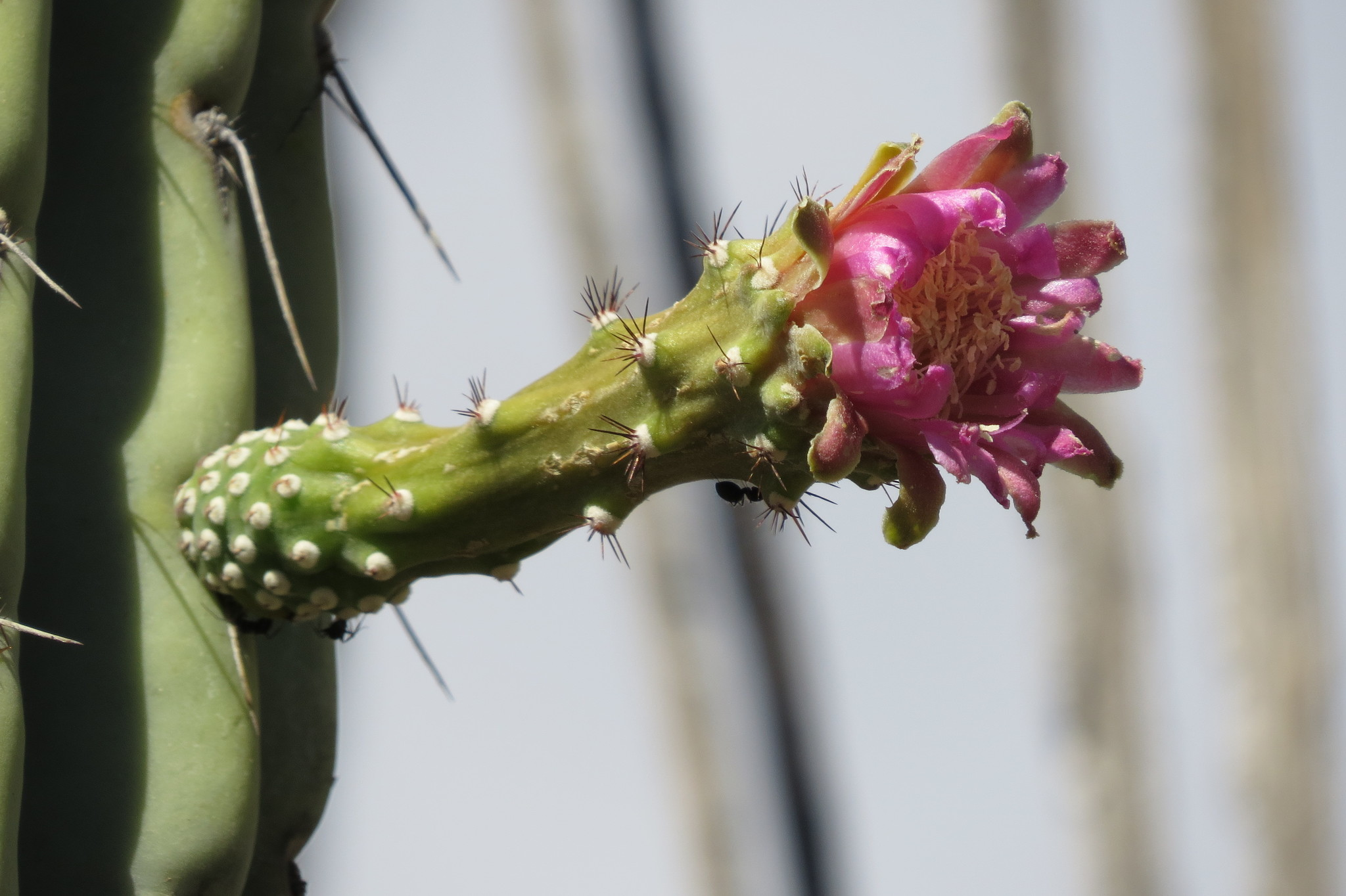

Conservation status
- Least Concern (IUCN 3.1)

Scientific classification
- Kingdom: Plantae
- Clade: Tracheophytes
- Clade: Angiosperms
- Clade: Eudicots
- Order: Caryophyllales
- Family: Cactaceae
- Subfamily: Cactoideae
- Genus: Armatocereus
- Species: A. rauhii

Binomial name
- Armatocereus rauhii Backeb.

Synonyms
- Armatocereus balsasensis F.Ritter = A. rauhii subsp. balsasensis; Armatocereus arduus F.Ritter = A. rauhii subsp. balsasensis

= Armatocereus rauhii =

Species of plant

Armatocereus rauhii is a tall, branched columnar species of cactus endemic to the north of Peru on the western slopes of the Andes.

== Description ==
Armatocereus is a tall, treelike cactus, bluish to greyish green in colour, usually with a trunk to about 1 m (3 ft) high followed by upright branches. Depending on the subspecies, it reaches a maximum height of 6–10 m (20–33 ft), with branches 8–15 cm (3 1/4–6 in) thick. The stems have 6–12 ribs. The areoles bear about 6–7 short spines, only 1–2 mm (1/32–3/32 in) long – somewhat more spines in the case of subspecies balsasensis. The flowers are 10–15 cm (4–6 in) long, carmine or purple in colour, with black to red spines on the floral tube.

=== Subspecies ===
Image	Scientific name	Description	Distribution
	Armatocereus rauhii subsp. balsasensis (F.Ritter) Ostolaza	the subspecific epithet refers to the district of Balsas in Peru. This subspecies is taller with 6–10 m (20–33 ft) , with thinner branches.	Peru
	Armatocereus rauhii subsp. rauhii	Height of 4–6 m (13–20 ft)	Peru

== Distribution ==
Armatocereus rauhii is endemic to the north of Peru. Within the country, the stated distribution of the species as a whole and of the subspecies varies by source, but centres on the regions of Amazonas, Cajamarca and Lambayeque. It may also include the regions of Ancash and Piura. The species is found in dry valleys, rocky slopes and scrubland on the western side of the Andes, and has been reported as occurring at altitudes of 500–1,500 m (1,600–4,900 ft), with the higher altitudes being further south.

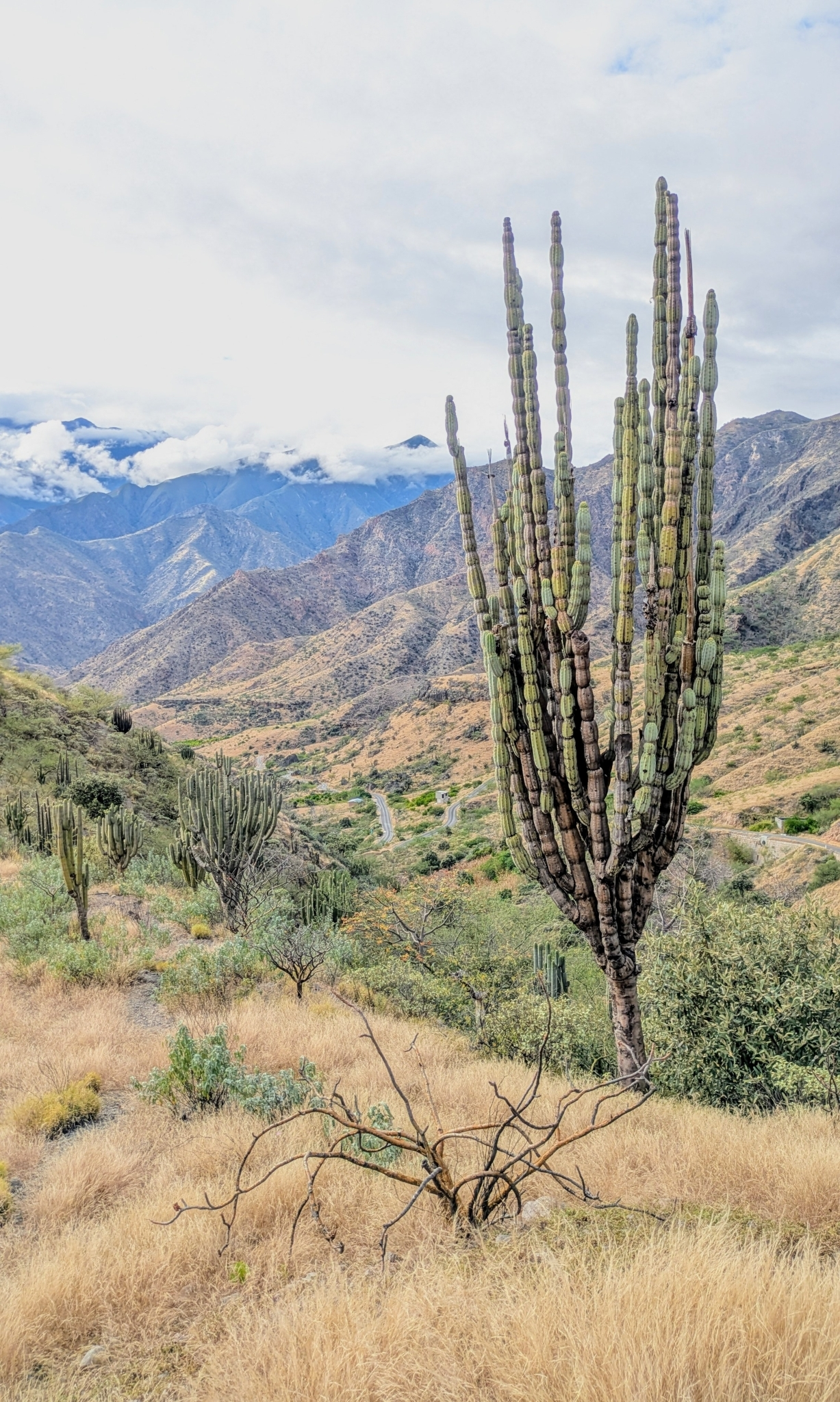
Habitat in Oxamarca, Peru

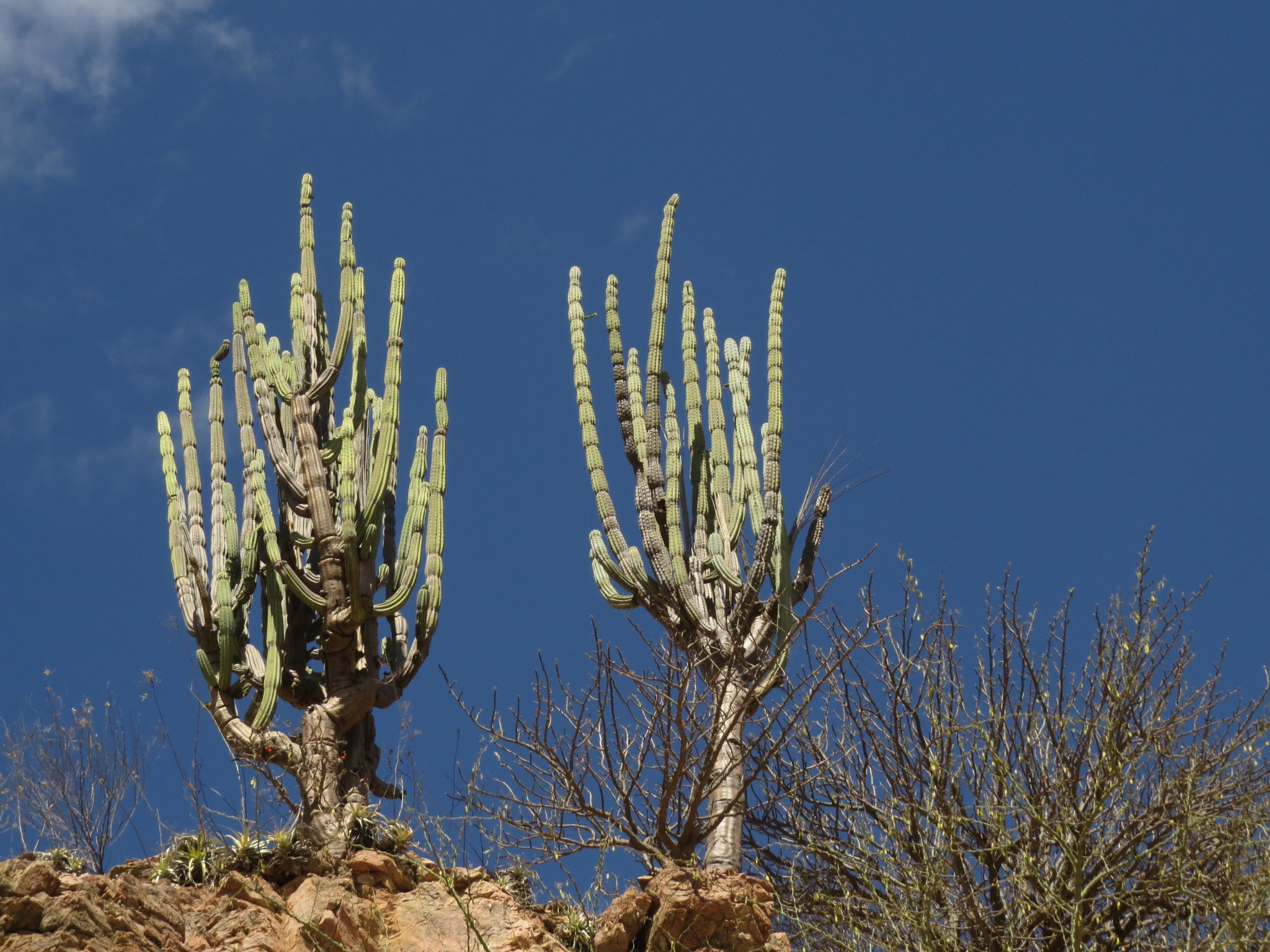

== Conservation ==
The 2013 assessment in the IUCN Red List did not differentiate between the subspecies, rating the species as whole as of "least concern". Earlier, A. rauhii subsp. balsasensis was rated as "vulnerable".

== Taxonomy ==
The species was first described by Curt Backeberg in 1957. The specific epithet rauhii honours Werner Rauh. Two species described by Friedrich Ritter in 1981, Armatocereus balsasensis and Armatocereus arduus, are included in this species, as synonyms of A. rauhii subsp. balsasensis, by some sources. Other sources maintain A. arduus as a separate species, although noting that its taxonomic status is uncertain.
