= Exacum loheri =

Scientific classification
- Kingdom: Plantae
- Clade: Tracheophytes
- Clade: Angiosperms
- Clade: Eudicots
- Clade: Asterids
- Order: Gentianales
- Family: Gentianaceae
- Genus: Exacum
- Species: E. loheri

Binomial name
- Exacum loheri (H.Hara) Klack.

Species of plant

Exacum loheri is a species of plant in the family Gentianaceae which is endemic in Rizal, Philippines.

== Description ==
Exacum loheri is achlorophyllous, meaning it lacks chlorophyll. It is also mycoheterotrophic, drawing nutrients through its symbiotic relationship with underground fungi instead as a means to survive Masungi's limestone-rich soil.

== Habitat ==
It is recorded to grow within the Masungi Georeserve in Rizal, Philippines in 2025. Prior to this, the last record of the Exacum loheri was noted in 1895 by Swiss botanist August Loher. The 2025 rediscovery was made by students of the University of the Philippines Diliman and the Philippine Normal University.

== Further readings ==
- Mansibang, Jayson; Alterado, Lawrence Jacob; Espinosa, Aaron Gabriel; Blancaflor, Erwin (October 2025). "Notes on the Poorly Known Exacum loheri (H. Hara) Klack. (Gentianaceae) and a Key to the Philippine Species of Exacum" (PDF). Philippine Journal of Science. 154 (5): 1227–1230. ISSN 0031-7683.
