= Exacum caeruleum =

Conservation status
- Vulnerable (IUCN 3.1)

Scientific classification
- Kingdom: Plantae
- Clade: Tracheophytes
- Clade: Angiosperms
- Clade: Eudicots
- Clade: Asterids
- Order: Gentianales
- Family: Gentianaceae
- Genus: Exacum
- Species: E. caeruleum

Binomial name
- Exacum caeruleum Balf.f. (1883)

Synonyms
- Exacum forbesii Balf.f. (1903)

Species of plant

Exacum caeruleum is a species of a plant in the Gentianaceae family. It is an annual endemic to the island of Socotra in Yemen. Its natural habitat is dense shrubland in the Hajhir Mountains from 900 to 1,250 meters elevation.

== Description ==
Its notable features include:

Flowers: Typically a bluish‑lavender or violet colour, with prominently golden‑yellow stamens. (Photographs of close relatives show these character traits)

Leaves: Opposite, glossy or semi‑glossy, simple in shape, clustered on stems.

Habit: In its natural habitat, grows in dense shrublands or among rocks and shrub communities at high elevations.

Morphology (genus‑typical): According to data for the genus Exacum, stems are erect or branched, glabrous, leaves are opposite and the flowers are in cymes (axillary or terminal), the calyx lobed nearly to base, corolla rotate with lobes longer than the tube, 4–5 stamens inserted at throat, ovary 2‑locular, capsule 2‑valved, seeds many.
