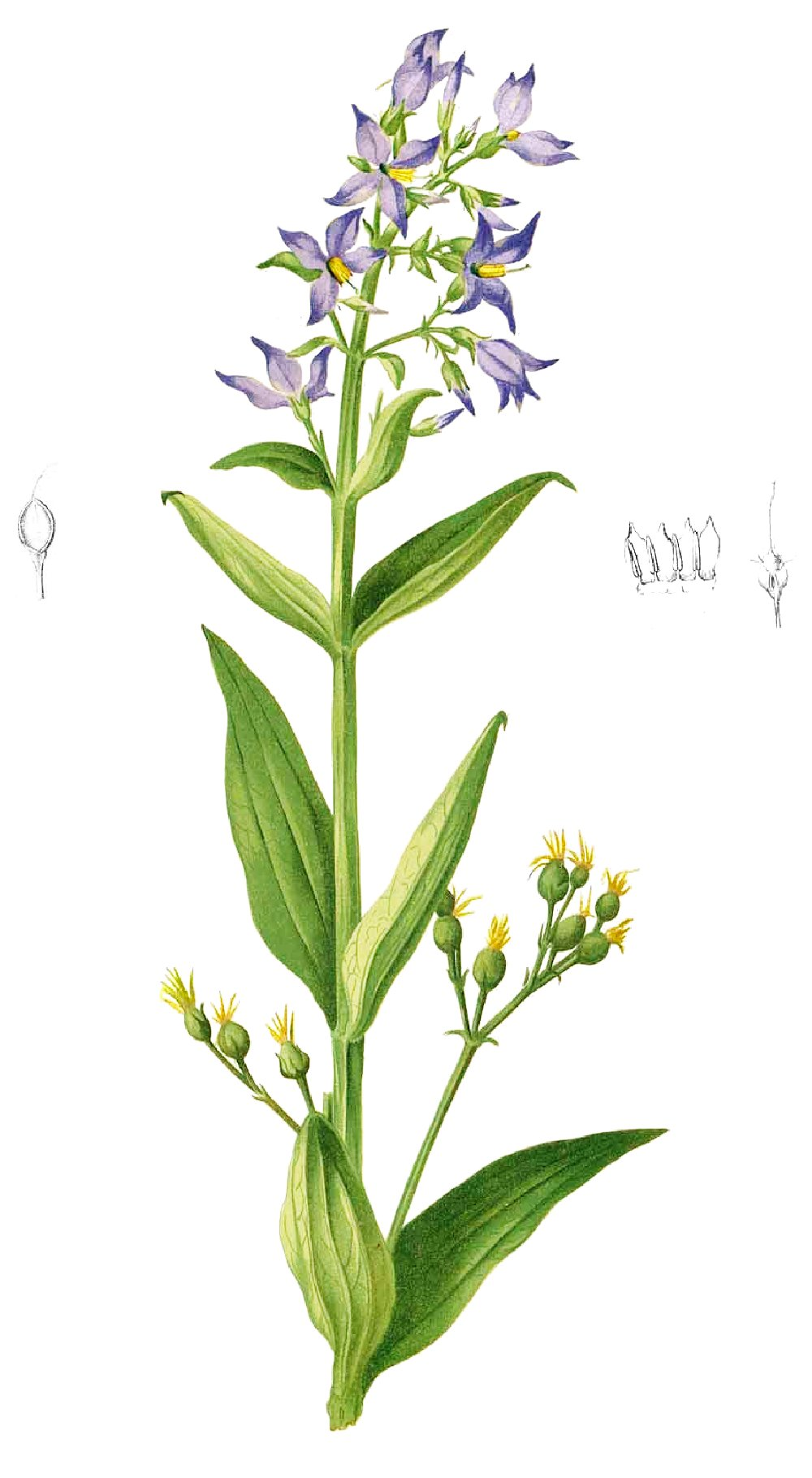

Scientific classification
- Kingdom: Plantae
- Clade: Embryophytes
- Clade: Tracheophytes
- Clade: Angiosperms
- Clade: Eudicots
- Clade: Asterids
- Order: Gentianales
- Family: Gentianaceae
- Genus: Exacum
- Species: E. tetragonum

Binomial name
- Exacum tetragonum Roxb.

= Exacum tetragonum =

Species of plant

Exacum tetragonum, the bicolor Persian violet, is a species of plant in the family Gentianaceae. Its natural habitat is subtropical or tropical moist grassy forests, and it blooms in late monsoon. The plant likely is pollinated mainly by butterflies and other insects.

== Gallery ==
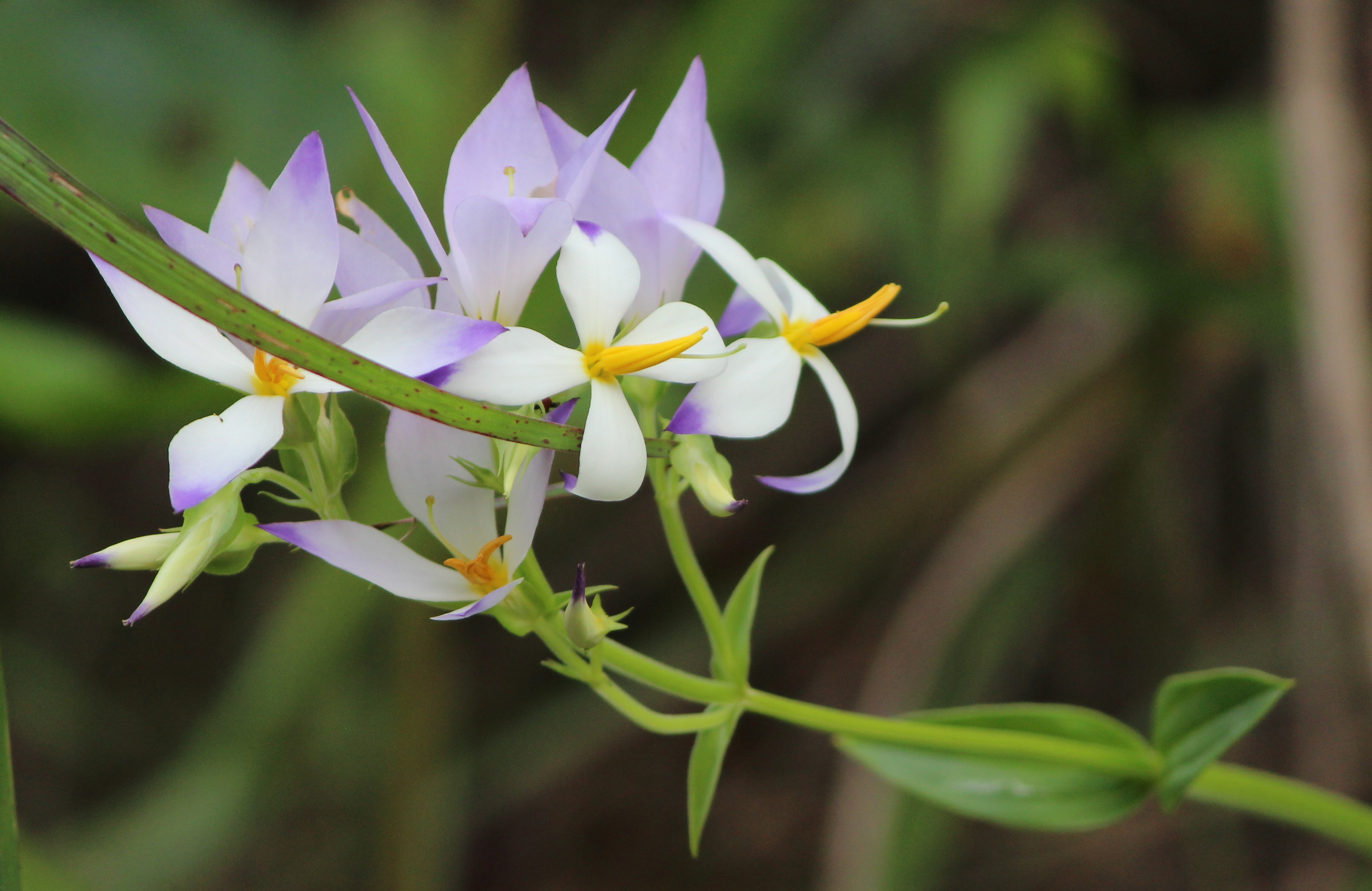
At Wayanad, Kerala

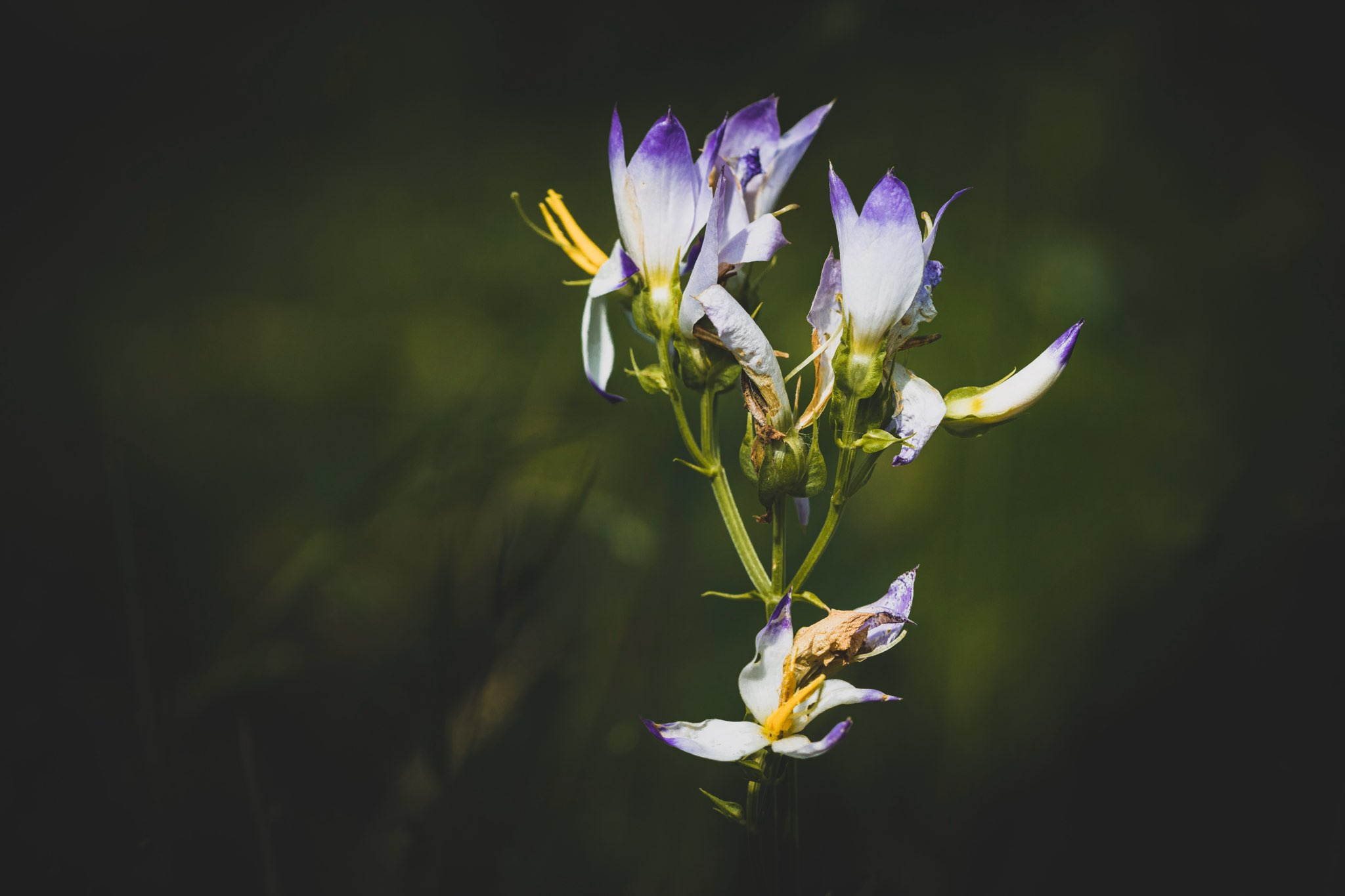
