= Diplostigmaty =

In botany, presence of extra stigmas along the style

Diplostigmaty refers, in botany, to the presence of extra stigmas along the style. This condition is known from the genus Sebaea. It is thought to provide reproductive assurance.
