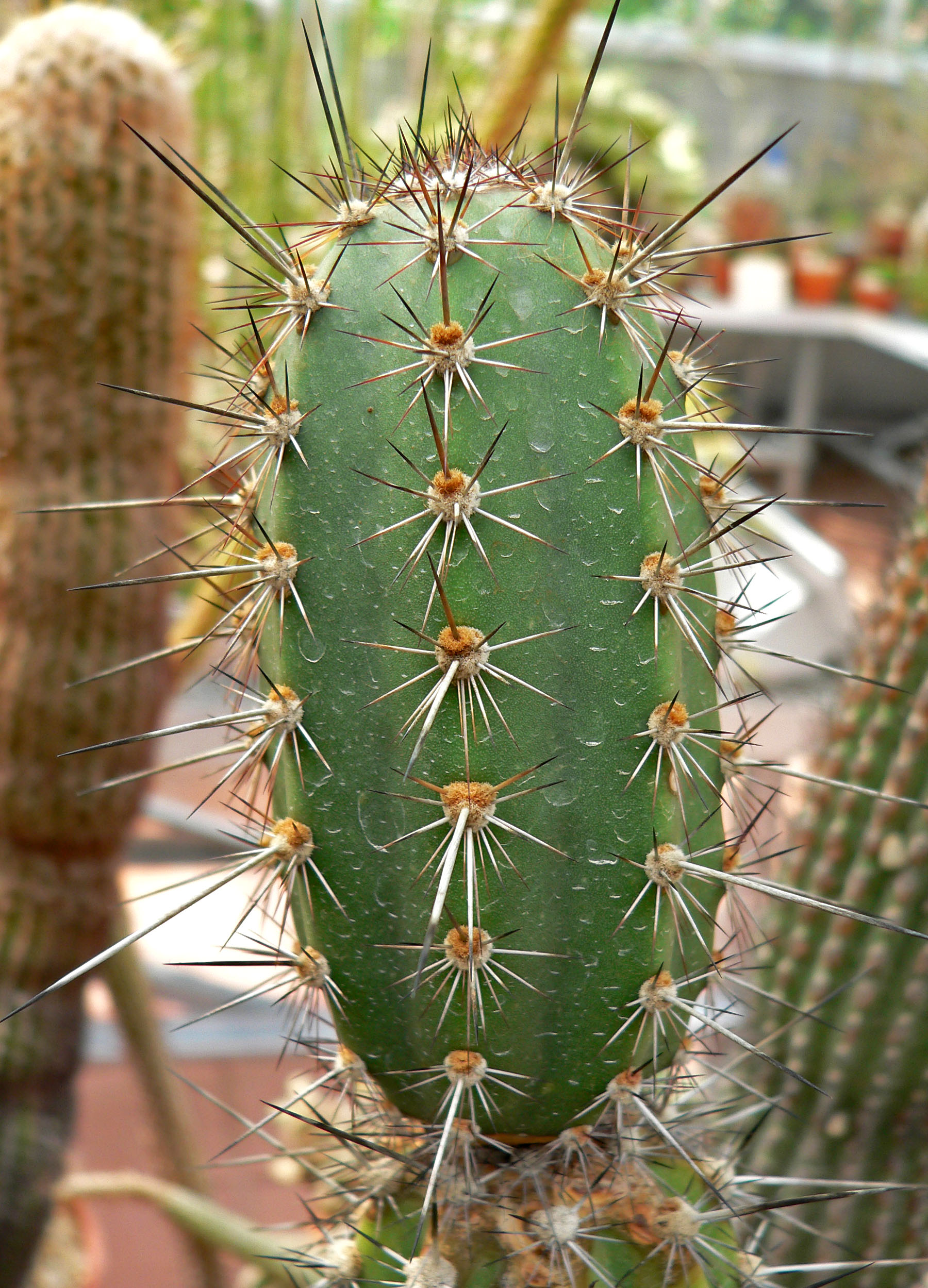

Conservation status
- Least Concern (IUCN 3.1)

Scientific classification
- Kingdom: Plantae
- Clade: Tracheophytes
- Clade: Angiosperms
- Clade: Eudicots
- Order: Caryophyllales
- Family: Cactaceae
- Subfamily: Cactoideae
- Genus: Armatocereus
- Species: A. cartwrightianus

Binomial name
- Armatocereus cartwrightianus (Britton & Rose) Backeb. ex A.W. Hill 1991

= Armatocereus cartwrightianus =

Species of cactus

Armatocereus cartwrightianus is a species of Armatocereus from Ecuador and Peru.

== Description ==
Armatocereus cartwrightianus grows as a shrub or tree and reaches heights of up to 12 meters. Usually a well-developed trunk of up to 2 meters in height and a diameter of 30 cm (12 in) is formed. The dark green shoots are divided into 30 to 60 cm (12 to 24 in) long segments with a diameter of 7 to 10 cm (2.8 to 3.9 in), which are tapered at both ends. There are six to nine ribs, separated by deep incisions, that are 1.5 to 2.5 cm (0.59 to 0.98 in) high. The needle-like, brown thorns later turn white and have a darker tip. The one to four central spines have a length of 2 to 10 cm (0.79 to 3.94 in). The 15 to 25 spread radial spines are 5 to 25 mm (0.20 to 0.98 in) long.

The white flowers stand out horizontally. They are 7 to 9 cm (2.8 to 3.5 in) long and have a diameter of 4 to 5 cm (1.6 to 2.0 in). The egg-shaped fruits are initially green and later turn red. They are 5 to 9 cm (2.0 to 3.5 in) long.

== Distribution ==
Armatocereus cartwrightianus is distributed on dry coastal plains in southern Ecuador and northern Peru.

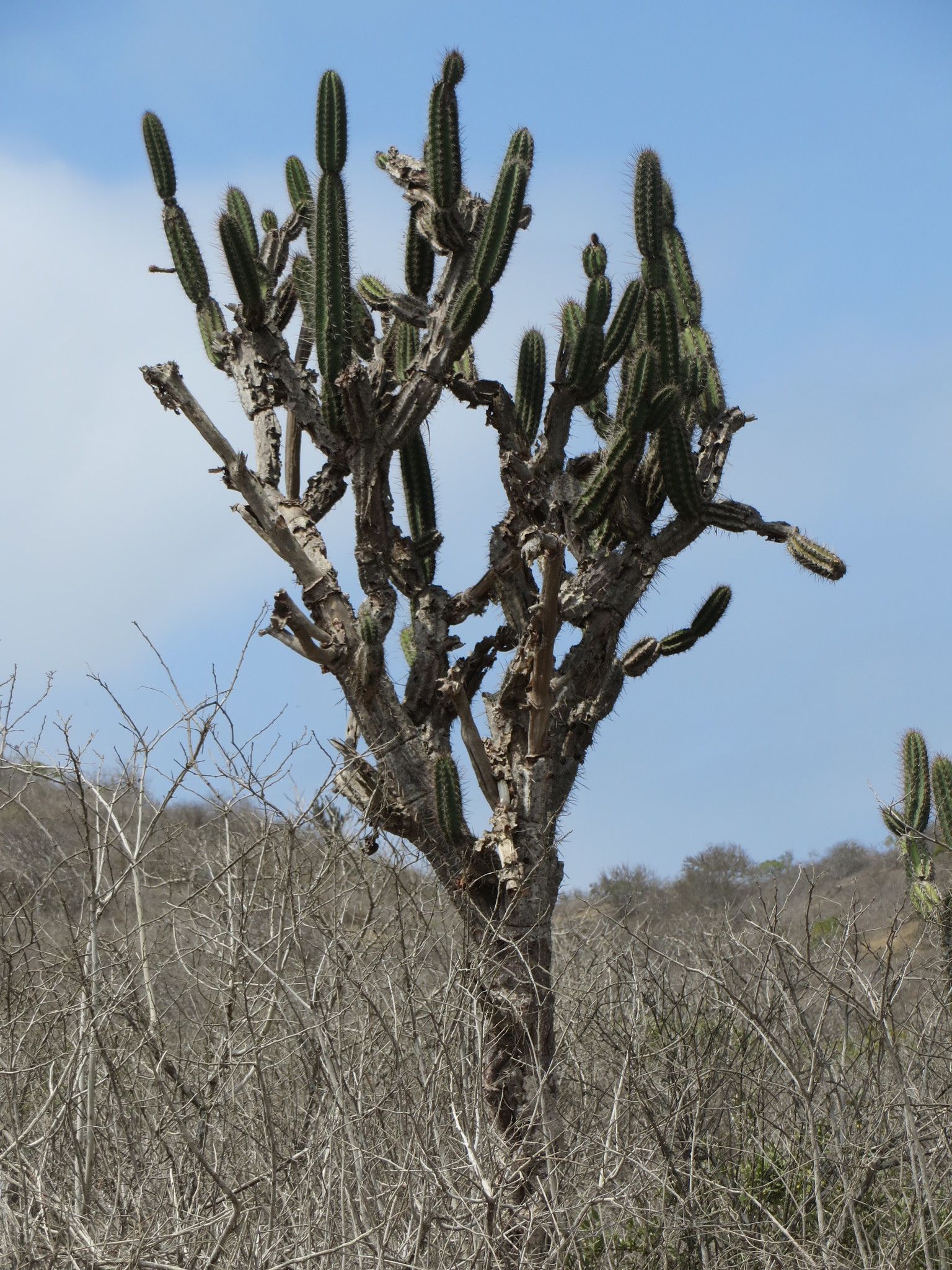
Plant in Montecristi, Ecuador

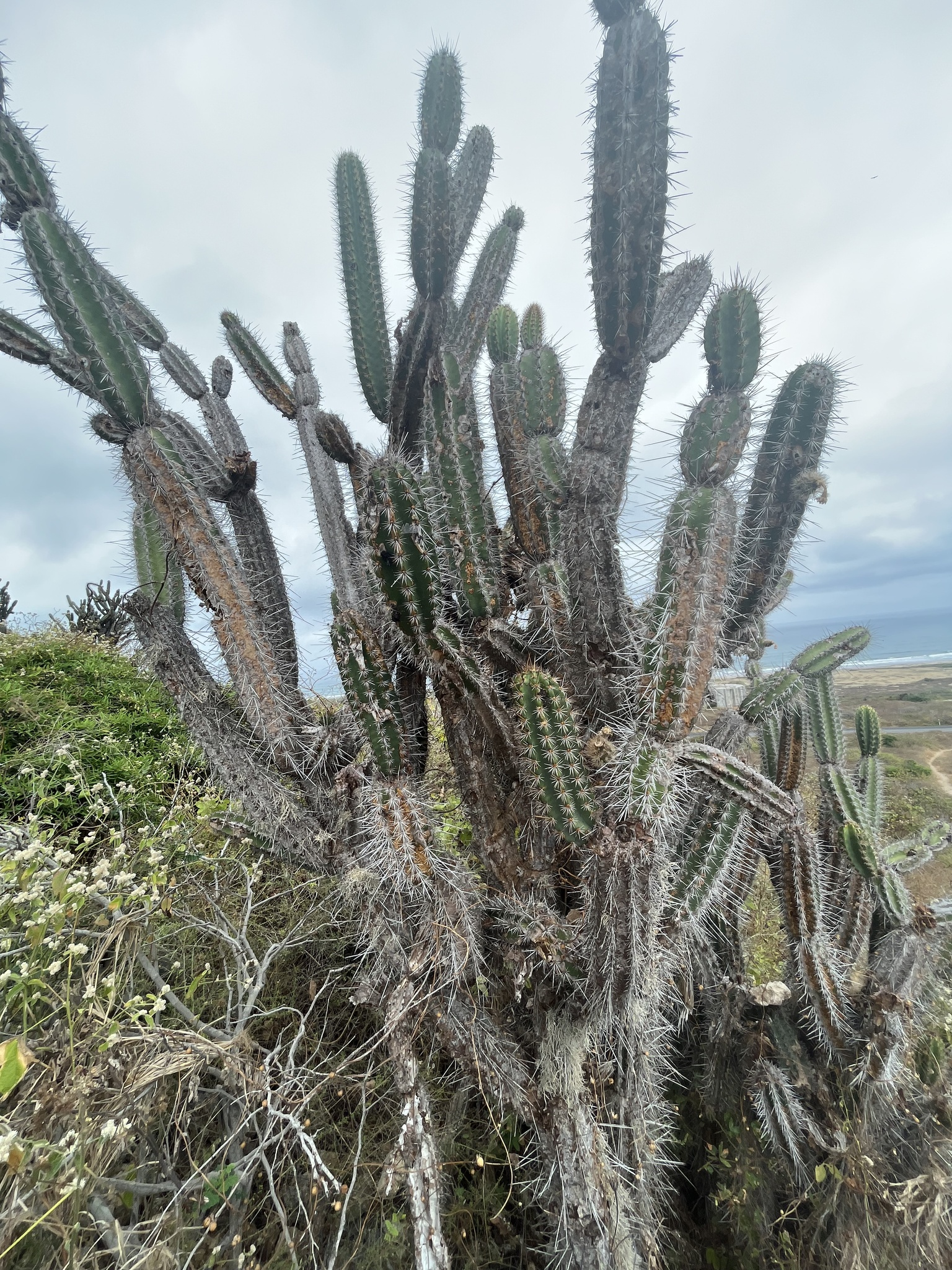
Habitat in Salinas, Ecuador

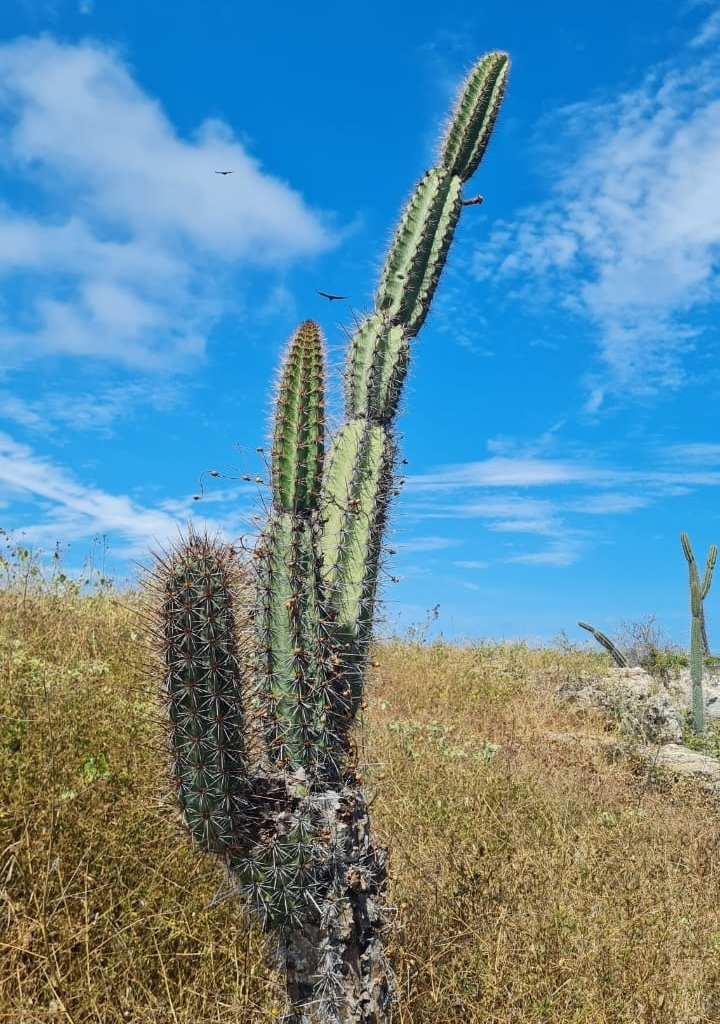
Plant growing in Salinas, Ecuador

== Taxonomy ==
The first description as Lemaireocereus cartwrightianus by Nathaniel Lord Britton and Joseph Nelson Rose was published in 1920. Arthur William Hill placed the species in the genus Armatocereus in 1938. Other nomenclature synonyms include Cereus cartwrightianus (Britton & Rose) Werderm. (1931) and Armatocereus cartwrightianus Backeb. (1936)
