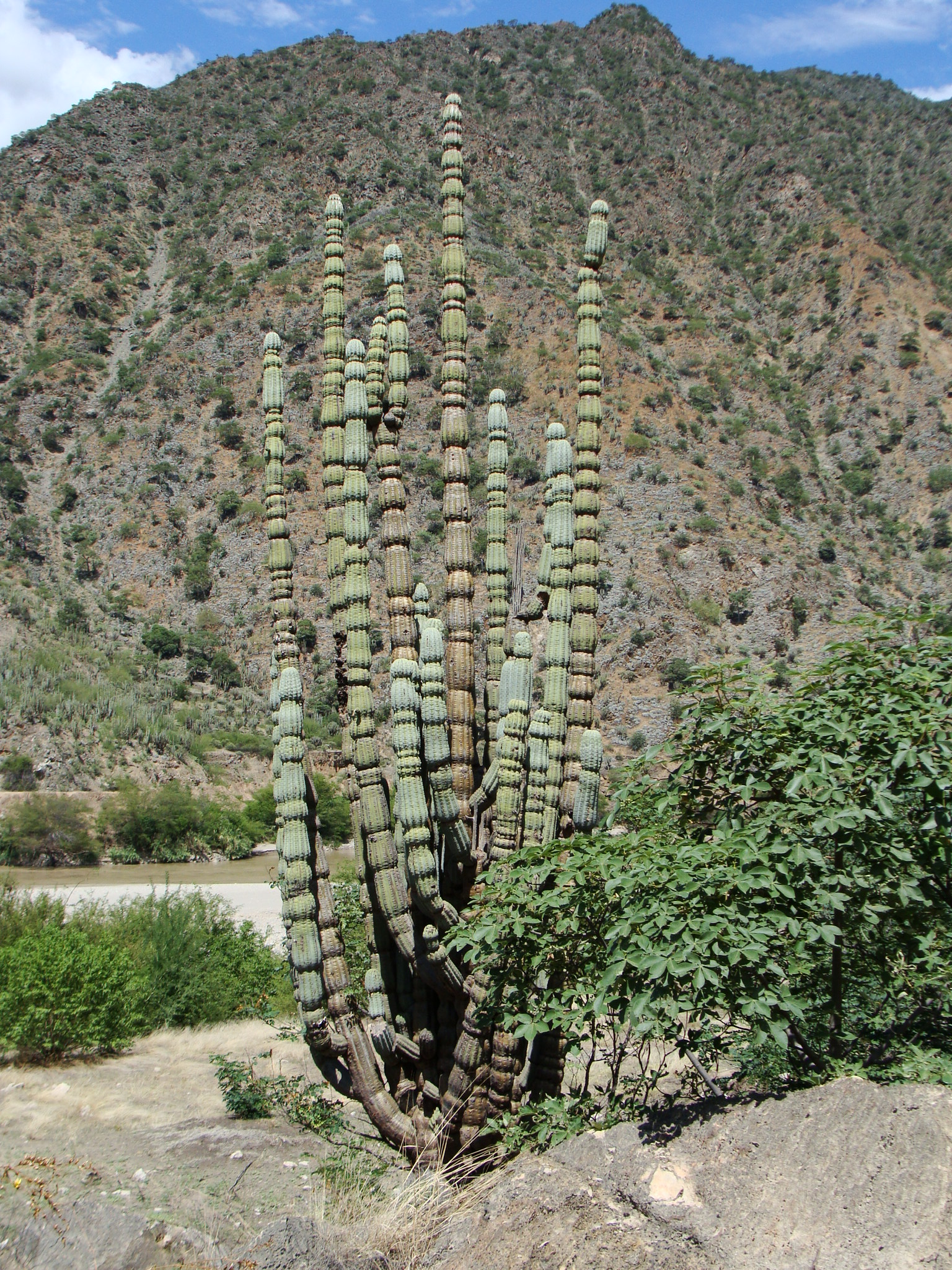
- Armatocereus rauhii subsp. balsasensis

Scientific classification
- Kingdom: Plantae
- Clade: Tracheophytes
- Clade: Angiosperms
- Clade: Eudicots
- Order: Caryophyllales
- Family: Cactaceae
- Subfamily: Cactoideae
- Tribe: Echinocereeae
- Genus: Armatocereus; Backeb.

Type species
- Armatocereus laetus

Species
- See text

= Armatocereus =

Species of plant

Armatocereus (from Latin armatus, "armed" and cereus, "pliant/soft") is a genus of mostly tree-like cacti from South America (Ecuador and Peru). These species have a conspicuous constriction at the end of the annual growth. The flowers are mostly white, with a more or less spiny ovary. The fruits are mostly spiny.

== Description ==
Armatocereus species are columnar cacti, bushlike or treelike, with cylindrical upright branched stems. The stems have 5–12 distinct ribs, and are made up of sections with a narrower "neck" between them, corresponding to annual growth. The large areoles bear strong spines, rarely few or none. The narrow tubular flowers appear at night, and have a spiny ovary and floral tube and white petals (red in A. rauhii). The red or green fruit is large, globular or ovoid, with strong spines that are lost on maturity. It contains large black seeds, ovoid or kidney-shaped.

== Taxonomy ==
The genus name was first mentioned in print by Curt Backeberg in 1934, and again in 1935. However, at the time, the International Code of Botanical Nomenclature required a Latin description for a genus name to be accepted, and this was not published until 1938. Armatocereus means "armed cereus", referring to the spines.

=== Phylogeny and classification ===
Classifications based on morphological characters placed Armatocereus in the subfamily Cactoideae, tribe Browningieae. However, molecular phylogenetic studies have repeatedly shown that the tribe Browningieae is not monophyletic (like most other traditional cactus tribes). A 2011 study places Armatocereus in a clade called "PHB", as it contains members of the previously defined tribes Pachycereeae, Hylocereeae and Browningieaes; other Browningieae members, including Browningia, are placed in a more distantly related BCT clade. The main clades in the resulting phylogeny are shown below.

- Cactoideae
  - Blossfeldia liliputana
  - - Cacteae
    - - minor clades
      - - Core Cactoideae I
          - minor clades
          - PHB clade, including Armatocereus and other Browningieae
        - Core Cactoideae II
          - Rhipsalideae
          - - Core Notocacteae
            - BCT clade, including other Browningieae

=== Species ===
As of 2025 Plants of the World Online accept the following species:

| Image | Scientific name | Distribution |
|---|---|---|
| | Armatocereus cartwrightianus (Britton & Rose) Backeb. | Ecuador and Peru |
| | Armatocereus ghiesbreghtii (K.Schum.) F.Ritter | Peru |
| | Armatocereus godingianus (Britton & Rose) Backeb. | Ecuador and Peru |
| | Armatocereus laetus (Kunth) Backeb. | Peru |
| | Armatocereus matucanensis Backeb. | Ecuador and Peru |
| | Armatocereus procerus Rauh & Backeb. | Southern Peru. |
| | Armatocereus rauhii Backeb. | north of Peru |

Other sources, including Anderson (2001), list further species not accepted in The Plant List:

- Armatocereus arduus F.Ritter = A. rauhii
- Armatocereus ghiesbreghtii (K.Schum.) F.Ritter – status unresolved in The Plant List
- Armatocereus mataranus F.Ritter = A. matucanensis
- Armatocereus oligogonus Rauh & Backeb. = A. matucanensis
- Armatocereus riomajensis Rauh & Backeb. = A. matucanensis
- Armatocereus rupicola F.Ritter = A. rauhii

== Distribution and habitat ==
The genus is found in Ecuador and Peru, with most species occurring in Peru. (Older sources include Stenocereus humilis in the genus, which occurs in Columbia.)
