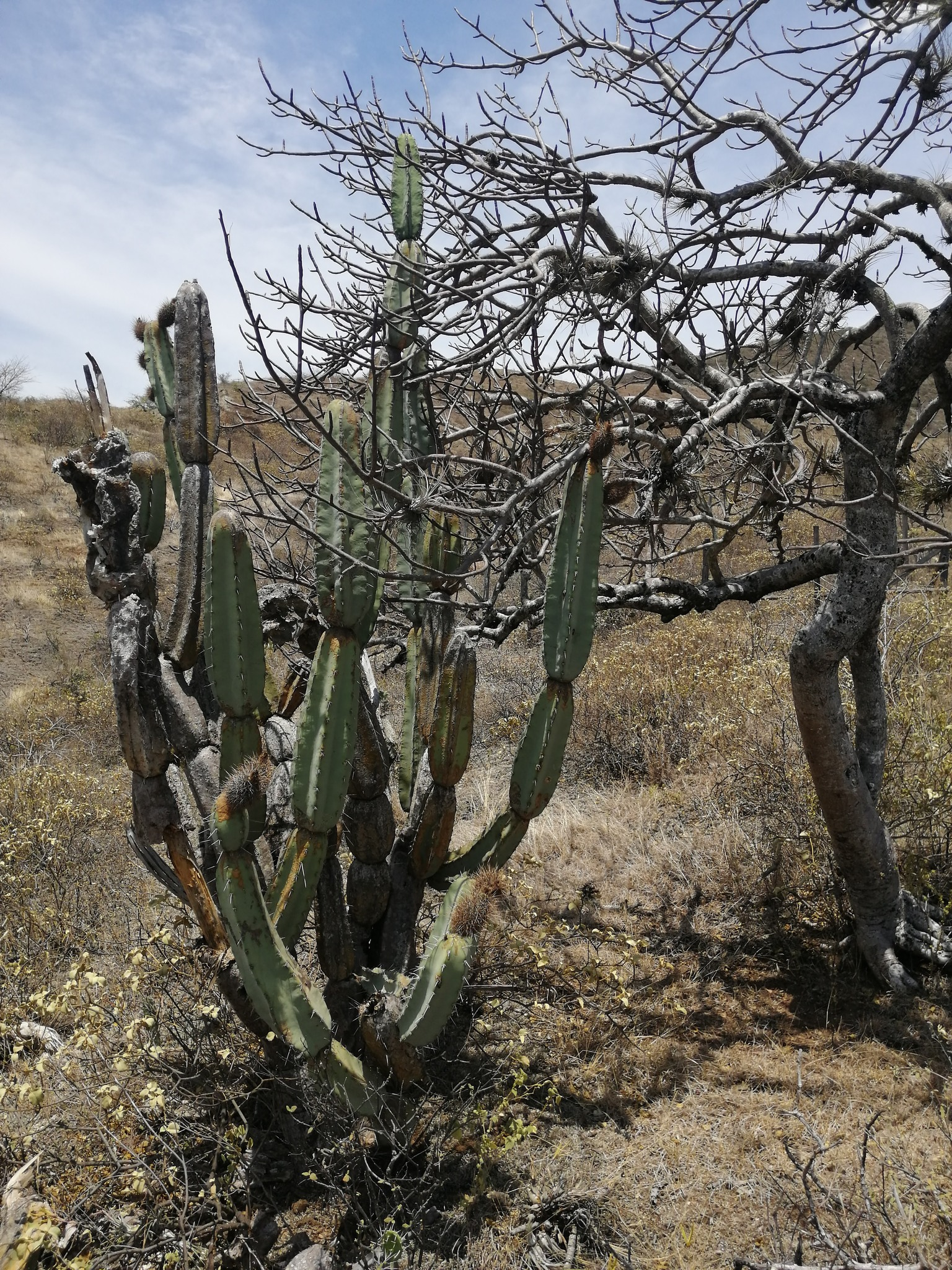

Conservation status
- Least Concern (IUCN 3.1)

Scientific classification
- Kingdom: Plantae
- Clade: Tracheophytes
- Clade: Angiosperms
- Clade: Eudicots
- Order: Caryophyllales
- Family: Cactaceae
- Subfamily: Cactoideae
- Genus: Armatocereus
- Species: A. godingianus

Binomial name
- Armatocereus godingianus (Britton & Rose) Backeb. ex E. Salisb. 1947

= Armatocereus godingianus =

Species of cactus

Armatocereus godingianus is a species of Armatocereus from Ecuador and Peru.

== Description ==
Armatocereus godingianus grows in the form of a shrub or tree with numerous spreading shoots and reaches heights of up to 10 meters. A smooth trunk of up to 1.5 meters in height and a diameter of 15 - 50 cm (20 in) is often formed. The dark green shoots are divided into 30 - 60 cm (24 in) long segments with a diameter of 7 - 10 cm (3.9 in), which are thickest at their base. There are seven to eleven ribs, separated by deep incisions, that are 1.5 - 2.5 cm (0.98 in) high. The 15 - 25 needle-like, flexible, brown or yellow spines later turn gray and are spread out in all directions. They have a length of 1 - 5 cm (2.0 in).

The white flowers are 7 to 9 cm (2.8 to 3.5 in) long and have a diameter of 5 to 7 cm (2.0 to 2.8 in). The egg-shaped fruits are initially green and later turn brown and 6 to 13 cm (2.4 to 5.1 in) long.

=== Subspecies ===
Image	Subspecies	Distribution
	Armatocereus godingianus subsp. brevispinus (Madsen) D.R.Hunt	Loja, Ecuador 1700-2000 meters
	Armatocereus godingianus subsp. godingianus	Ecuador.

== Distribution ==
Armatocereus godingianus is common in Ecuador in Chimborazo Province along the Río Chanchán and in Azuay Province at altitudes of 1200 to 2300 meters.

== Taxonomy ==
The first description as Lemaireocereus godingianus was made in 1920 by Nathaniel Lord Britton and Joseph Nelson Rose. Edward James Salisbury placed the species in the genus Armatocereus in 1947. Another nomenclatural synonym is Armatocereus godingianus (Britton & Rose) Backeb. (1938).
