= Gentianothamnus =

Scientific classification
- Kingdom: Plantae
- Clade: Tracheophytes
- Clade: Angiosperms
- Clade: Eudicots
- Clade: Asterids
- Order: Gentianales
- Family: Gentianaceae
- Tribe: Exaceae
- Genus: Gentianothamnus; Humbert
- Species: G. madagascariensis

Binomial name
- Gentianothamnus madagascariensis Humbert

Genus of flowering plants

Gentianothamnus is a monotypic plant genus in the gentian family (Gentianaceae), tribe Exaceae. The sole species is Gentianothamnus madagascariensis. It is endemic to Madagascar.
