= Exacum socotranum =

Conservation status
- Critically Endangered (IUCN 3.1)

Scientific classification
- Kingdom: Plantae
- Clade: Tracheophytes
- Clade: Angiosperms
- Clade: Eudicots
- Clade: Asterids
- Order: Gentianales
- Family: Gentianaceae
- Genus: Exacum
- Species: E. socotranum

Binomial name
- Exacum socotranum Vierh.

Species of plant

Exacum socotranum is a species of flowering plant in the family Gentianaceae. It is an annual endemic to the island of Socotra in Yemen. It grows near seepages on vertical cliffs of the island's southwestern limestone escarpment. According to the International Union for Conservation of Nature, the species is currently critically endangered due to water diversion and housing development in its habitat.
