= Ornichia =

Scientific classification
- Kingdom: Plantae
- Clade: Tracheophytes
- Clade: Angiosperms
- Clade: Eudicots
- Clade: Asterids
- Order: Gentianales
- Family: Gentianaceae
- Tribe: Exaceae
- Genus: Ornichia; Klack., 1986

Genus of flowering plants

Ornichia is a plant genus in the gentian family (Gentianaceae), tribe Exaceae. The genus is endemic to Madagascar.

== Species ==
Three species are accepted:

- Ornichia lancifolia (Baker) Klack.
- Ornichia madagascariensis (Baker) Klack.
- Ornichia trinervis (Desr.) Klack.
