= Arthur William Hill =

British botanist and taxonomist (1875-1941)

- From the Transactions of the Royal Society of New Zealand
- Born: 11 October 1875
- Died: 3 November 1941
- Occupations: Botanist; botanical collector
- Awards: Honorary Fellow of the Royal Society Te Apārangi (1928–)
- Scientific career
- Fields: Botany, botanical nomenclature, botanical garden, economic botany
- Author abbrev. (botany): A.W.Hill

Sir Arthur William Hill KCMG FRS FLS (11 October 1875, in Watford – 3 November 1941, in Richmond) was Director of the Royal Botanic Gardens, Kew, and a noted botanist and taxonomist.

The only son of Daniel Hill, he attended Marlborough College where his interest in natural history was encouraged by the classical master and entomologist, Edward Meyrick. Hill went on to King's College, Cambridge, where he came under the influence of Marshall Ward and Walter Gardiner, acquiring an MA and DSc.

His numerous field trips started with the expedition of the English geographer, William Bisiker FRGS, to Iceland in 1900. This was followed by exploration of the Andes in Bolivia and Peru in 1903, sparking an interest in cushion plants which was to last throughout his life, and the Caribbean in 1911.

In 1907 he joined Kew as assistant director under Sir David Prain, and started contributing to the floras of Africa and India. In 1922 he succeeded Prain as Director. With grants from the Empire Marketing Board, Hill was able to send botanists all over the world, himself visiting Australia, New Zealand, Malaya, Rhodesia, East Africa, India, Cyrenaica and the West Indies. His interests were not confined to taxonomy, but extended to Economic Botany, of which he was an enthusiastic proponent, and all the other activities of Kew. He managed a large number of changes in the Gardens, despite having to operate in the post-war austerity climate. Some of his greatest successes were in building, renovating, and extending glasshouses, being responsible for the new Rhododendron House in 1925–26, an improved Economic House in 1930 and the South African Succulent House in 1936.

He was elected an Honorary Member of the Royal Society of New Zealand during his 1928 visit, returning to London to lecture the Linnean Society in 1929 on natural hybrids in New Zealand. He published a joint paper with Brian Laurence Burtt in 1935 on the cushion plant genera Gaultheria and Pernettya (now included in Gaultheria) from alpine habitats in Asia, North and South America, and Australasia.

Hill never married and died on 3 November 1941 in a riding accident.

== Works ==
- William Bisiker, Arthur William Hill - Across Iceland: With Illustrations and Maps and an Appendix By A.W. Hill on the Plants (Edward Arnold, London, 1902)
- The Distribution and Character of Connecting Threads in the Tissues of Pinus sylvestris and other Allied Species (Phil Trans, 1901)
- The Histology of the Sieve-Tubes of Pinus (Ann Bot, 1901)
- The Histology of the Endosperm during Germination in Tamus communis and Galium tricorne (with W Gardiner) (Proc Camb Phil Soc, 1902)
- The Histology of the Sieve-Tubes of Angiosperms (Ann Bot, 1908)
- On the Structure and Affinities of a Lepidodendroid Stem (with A C Seward) (Trans Roy Soc Edin, 1900)
- The Morphology and Seedling Structure of the Geophilous Species of Peperomia, together with some views on the Origin of Monocotyledons (Ann Bot, 1906)
- Floral Mechanism of the Genus Sebaea (ibid, 1913)
- Studies in Seed Germination – the Genus Marah (ibid, 1916) (See Marah.)
- The History of Primula obconica under Cultivation (Journ of Genetics, 1912)
- Notes on a Journey in Bolivia and Peru around Lake Titicaca (Scottish Geol Journ, 1905)
- South America in its relation to Horticulture (Journ Roy Hort Soc, 1911)
- A Visit to the West Indies (Kew Bulletin, 1912)
- The Acaulescent Species of Malvastrum (Journ Linn Soc, 1909)
- A Revision of the Geophilous Species of Peperomia (Ann Bot, 1907)
- Gentianaceae (Flora Capensis, 1909)
- Santalaceae (ibid, 1915)
- The Genus Thesium in South Africa (Kew Bull 1915) (See Thesium.)
- The History and Functions of Botanic Gardens (Ann Missouri Bot Gardens, 1915)

== Honours, achievements and awards ==
- Awarded Veitch Memorial Medal, (1936)
- Knight Commander of the Order of St Michael and St George (KCMG), 1931 New Year Honours
- Companion of the Order of St Michael and St George (CMG), 1926 Birthday Honours
- Director of the Royal Botanic Gardens, Kew (1922)
- Dean of King's College, Cambridge, and University Lecturer in Botany
- Fellow of the Linnean Society (1908)
- Fellow of the Royal Society
