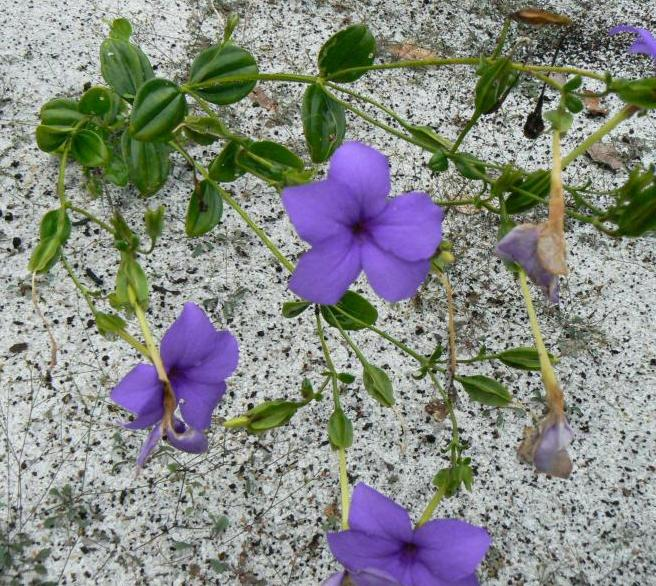
- Tachiadenus carinatus

Scientific classification
- Kingdom: Plantae
- Clade: Tracheophytes
- Clade: Angiosperms
- Clade: Eudicots
- Clade: Asterids
- Order: Gentianales
- Family: Gentianaceae
- Tribe: Exaceae
- Genus: Tachiadenus; Griseb.

Species
- See text.

Synonyms
- Carissophyllum Pichon

= Tachiadenus =

Genus of flowering plants

Tachiadenus is a plant genus in the gentian family (Gentianaceae), tribe Exaceae. It contains 12 species. The genus is endemic to Madagascar.

== Species ==
The following species are recognised:

- Tachiadenus antaisaka Humbert
- Tachiadenus boivinii Humbert ex Klack.
- Tachiadenus carinatus Griseb.
- Tachiadenus gracilis Griseb.
- Tachiadenus longiflorus Griseb.
- Tachiadenus longifolius Scott Elliot
- Tachiadenus pervillei Humbert
- Tachiadenus platypterus Baker
- Tachiadenus tubiflorus Griseb.
- Tachiadenus umbellatus Klack.
- Tachiadenus vohimavensis Humbert
