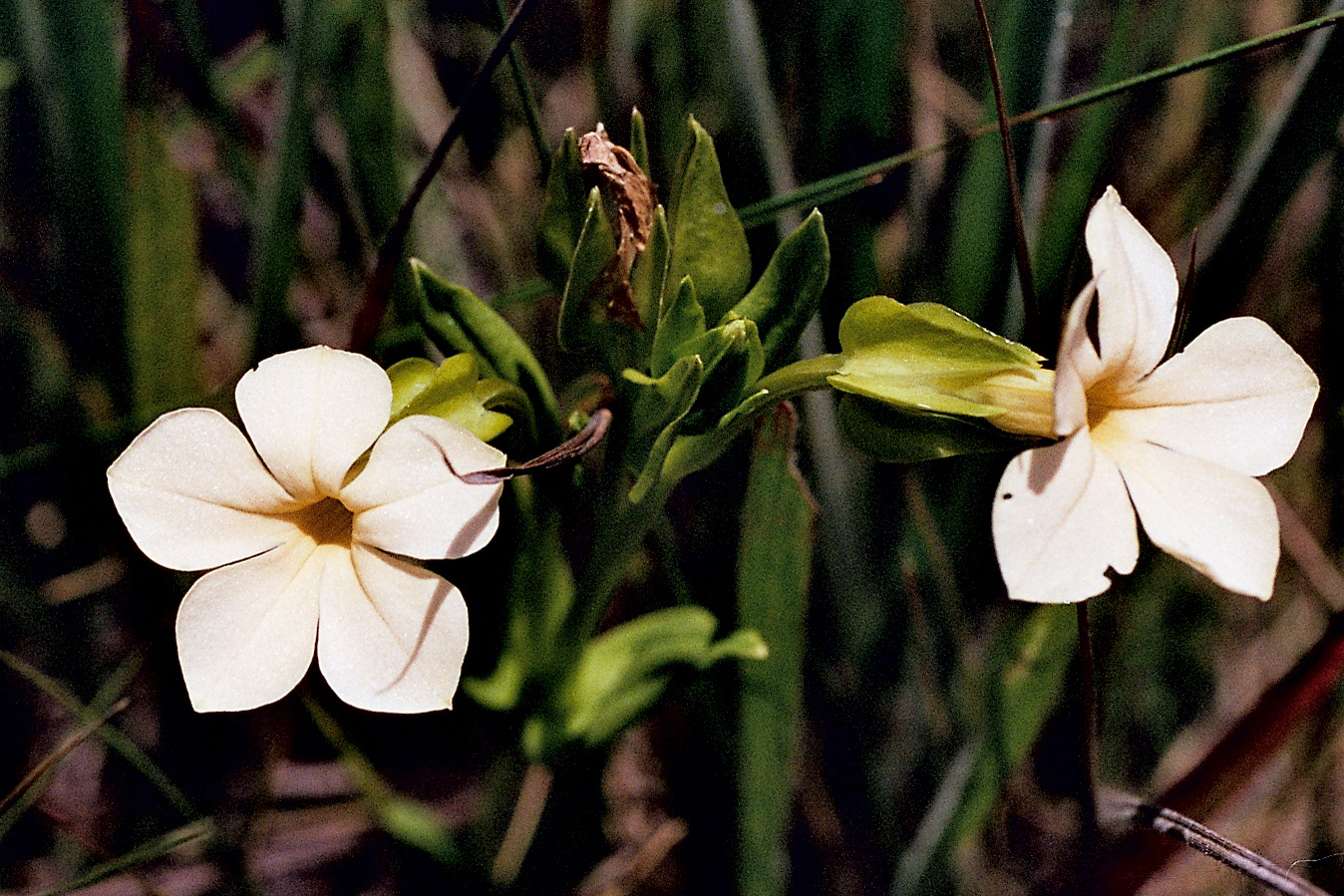
- Exochaenium grande

Scientific classification
- Kingdom: Plantae
- Clade: Tracheophytes
- Clade: Angiosperms
- Clade: Eudicots
- Clade: Asterids
- Order: Gentianales
- Family: Gentianaceae
- Tribe: Exaceae; Colla, 1834

Type genus
- Exacum L., 1754

= Exaceae =

Tribe of flowering plants

Exaceae is a flowering plant tribe in the family Gentianaceae. Exaceae comprises about 180 species assigned to eight monophyletic genera, with major centres of endemism in continental Africa (about 78 endemic species and two endemic genera), Madagascar (55 endemic species and four endemic genera) and the southern tip of India and Sri Lanka (14 endemic species).

== Genera ==
- Exacum L. (syn. Cotylanthera Blume)
- Exochaenium Griseb.
- Gentianothamnus Humbert
- Klackenbergia Kissling
- Lagenias E. Mey.
- Ornichia Klack.
- Sebaea Sol. ex R. Br. (syn. Belmontia)
- Tachiadenus Griseb.
