= Exacum anamallayanum =

Scientific classification
- Kingdom: Plantae
- Clade: Tracheophytes
- Clade: Angiosperms
- Clade: Eudicots
- Clade: Asterids
- Order: Gentianales
- Family: Gentianaceae
- Genus: Exacum
- Species: E. anamallayanum

Binomial name
- Exacum anamallayanum Bedd.

Synonyms
- Exacum atropurpureum var. anamallayanum (Bedd.) C.B.Clarke

Species of plant

Exacum anamallayanum, popularly known as Anamalai Persian violet, is a species of plant in the family Gentianaceae.

== Description ==
The plant grows 40–110 cm tall, with branched stems that are woody at the base and rounded below.

Leaves are elliptic to broadly ovate, 4–8 cm long and 2–4 cm wide, pointed, 3–5-nerved, entire, leathery, and stalkless, clasping the stem. The inflorescence is cymose and borne at the ends of branches. Flowers are 5-merous, bell-shaped or tubular, and deep blue, measuring 3.5–4.5 cm in length. Bracts are stalkless, linear, and 1–2.5 cm long; flower stalks are hairless, 0.5–2.5 cm in length.

The calyx is tubular, divided halfway into five sepals, with a tube 2–3 mm long and ovate-lanceolate sepals 5–7 mm long. Flowers are marcescent and nearly bell-shaped, 2.5–4 cm long, with a spherical tube 0.8–1.1 cm long and five obovate petals, each 1.7–3.5 cm long. The plant bears five stamens with 2 mm long linear filaments and oblong, hairy anthers 7–10 mm in length.

The ovary is bicarpellary, ovoid, and stalkless, measuring 6.5–7.5 mm long. The style is thread-like, 1.2–1.6 cm long, winged, and hairy, ending in a capitate stigma. The capsules are elliptic to ovate, 1–1.5 × 0.6–0.7 cm, and leathery.

== Flowering period ==
March to August.
