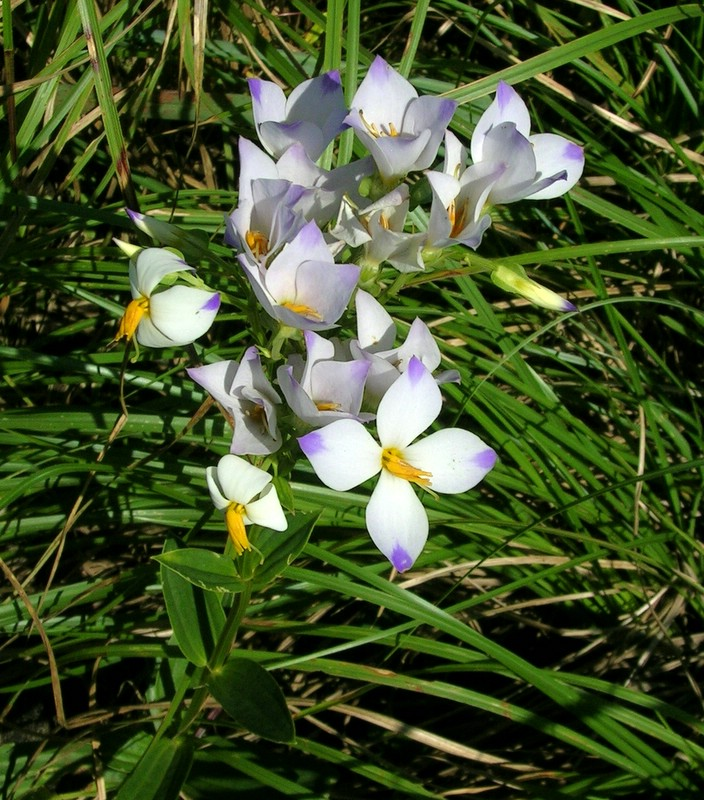
- Exacum bicolor from India

Scientific classification
- Kingdom: Plantae
- Clade: Tracheophytes
- Clade: Angiosperms
- Clade: Eudicots
- Clade: Asterids
- Order: Gentianales
- Family: Gentianaceae
- Tribe: Exaceae
- Genus: Exacum; L. (1753)

Species
- 75; see text
- Distribution of the genus Exacum.

Synonyms
- Chondropis Raf. (1837); Cotylanthera Blume (1826); Eophylon A.Gray (1869); Floyera Neck. (1790), opus utique oppr.; Paracelsea Zoll. & Moritzi (1845)

= Exacum =

Genus of plants

Exacum (/ˈɛksəkəm/ EK-sə-kəm) is a genus of plant in family Gentianaceae. It contains 75 species native to tropical regions of sub-Saharan Africa, southern Arabian Peninsula, south and southeast Asia, New Guinea, and Australia.

== Species ==
75 species are accepted.

- Exacum affine Balf.f. ex Regel
- Exacum alberti-grimaldii Wohlh. & Callm.
- Exacum amplexicaule Klack.
- Exacum anamallayanum Bedd.
- Exacum anisopterum Klack.
- Exacum appendiculatum Klack.
- Exacum arabicum Thulin
- Exacum atropurpureum Bedd.
- Exacum axillare Thwaites
- Exacum bulbilliferum Baker
- Exacum caeruleum Balf.f.
- Exacum conglomeratum Klack.
- Exacum courtallense Arn.
- Exacum darae Hul
- Exacum decapterum Klack.
- Exacum dipterum Klack.
- Exacum divaricatum (Baker) Schinz
- Exacum dolichantherum Klack.
- Exacum emirnense (Baker) Schinz
- Exacum exiguum Klack.
- Exacum fruticosum Humbert
- Exacum giganteum Klack.
- Exacum gracile Klack.
- Exacum hamiltonii G.Don
- Exacum hoffmannii Vatke ex Schinz
- Exacum humbertii Klack.
- Exacum idukkianum Geethakum., Pandur., Ravich. & Deepu
- Exacum intermedium Klack.
- Exacum keralense Geethakum., K.M.P.Kumar, Pandur. & Deepu
- Exacum klackenbergii Gopalan
- Exacum lawii C.B.Clarke
- Exacum laxiflorum (Gamble) Geethakum., Deepu, Kissling & Pandur.
- Exacum linearifolium (Humbert) Klack.
- Exacum loheri (H.Hara) Klack.
- Exacum lokohense Humbert
- Exacum macranthum Arn. ex Griseb.
- Exacum marojejyense Humbert
- Exacum nanum Klack.
- Exacum naviculare Klack.
- Exacum nossibeense Klack.
- Exacum nummulariifolium Humbert
- Exacum oldenlandioides (S.Moore) Klack.
- Exacum pallidum (Trimen) Klack.
- Exacum paucisquamum (C.B.Clarke) Klack.
- Exacum pedunculatum L.
- Exacum penninerve Klack.
- Exacum petiolare Griseb.
- Exacum pteranthum Wall. ex G.Don
- Exacum pumilum Griseb.
- Exacum quinquenervium Griseb.
- Exacum radicans Humbert
- Exacum rotundifolium Klack.
- Exacum sessile L.
- Exacum socotranum Vierh.
- Exacum spathulatum Baker
- Exacum speciosum Klack.
- Exacum stenophyllum Klack.
- Exacum stenopterum Klack.
- Exacum subacaule Humbert
- Exacum subteres Klack.
- Exacum subverticillatum Humbert
- Exacum sutaepense Hosseus ex Craib
- Exacum tenue (Blume) Klack.
- Exacum teres Wall.
- Exacum tetragonum Roxb.
- Exacum travancoricum Bedd.
- Exacum trinervium (L.) Druce
- Exacum umbellatum Klack.
- Exacum undulatum Klack.
- Exacum walkeri Arn. ex Griseb.
