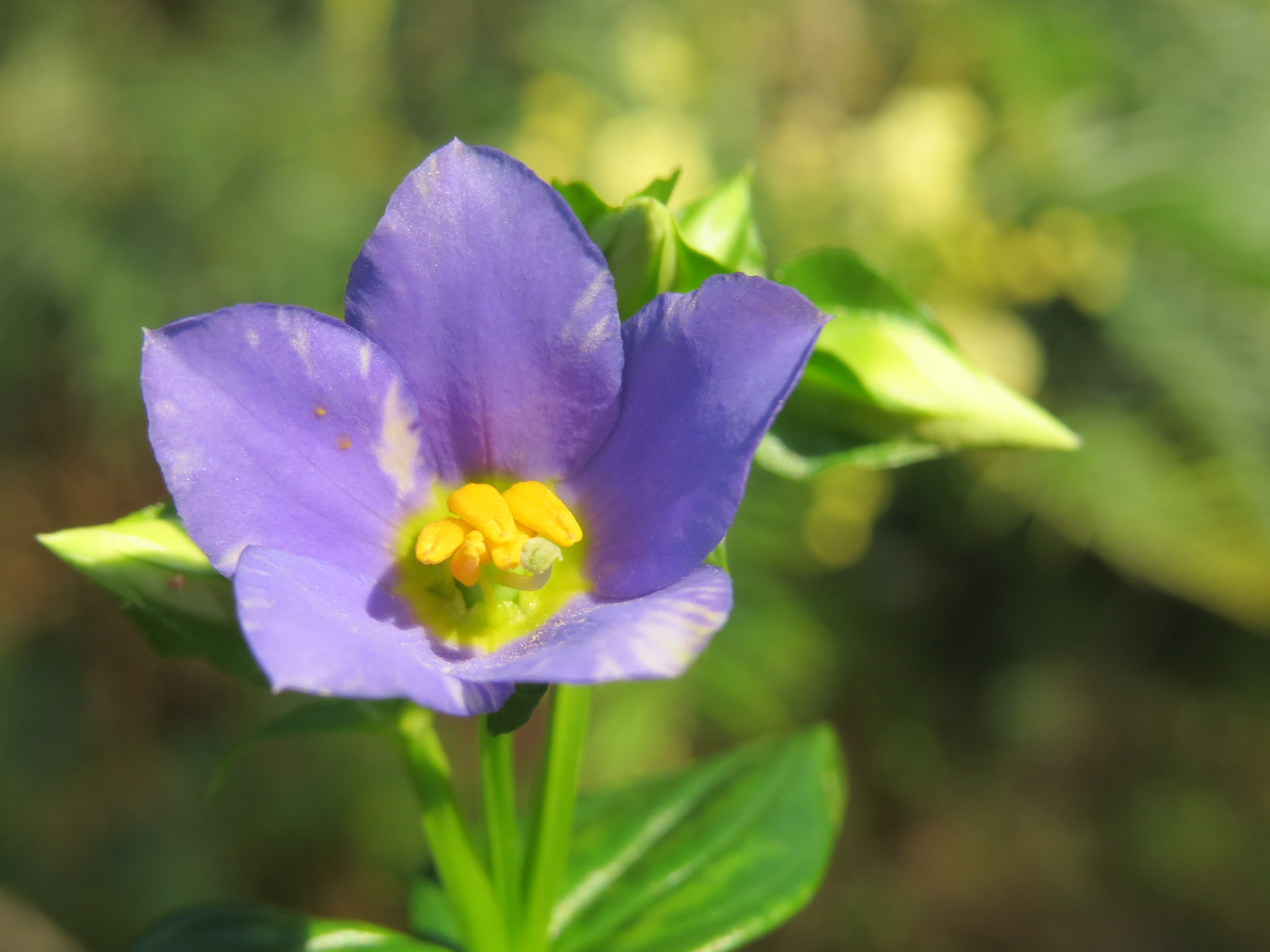

Scientific classification
- Kingdom: Plantae
- Clade: Tracheophytes
- Clade: Angiosperms
- Clade: Eudicots
- Clade: Asterids
- Order: Gentianales
- Family: Gentianaceae
- Genus: Exacum
- Species: E. travancoricum

Binomial name
- Exacum travancoricum Bedd. (1869)

= Exacum travancoricum =

Species of flowering plant

Exacum travancoricum is one of the rare and threatened plants of Western Ghats. It comes under family Gentianaceae. Moderately to much branched usually laxly cushion-like herb with elliptic, somewhat succulent leaves and usually solitary terminal pale blue to blue flowers. Endemic to southern Western Ghats at 950 to 1800 meters elevation (Ponmudi, Agasthyamala and Tinnevelly hills). Flowers during July - November.

Leaves dense, fleshy, 1-1.5 x 0.6-0.8 cm, elliptic-ovate, obtuse to round at apex, attenuate at base; margins thin; midrib prominent.
