= Armatocereus ghiesbreghtii =

Scientific classification
- Kingdom: Plantae
- Clade: Tracheophytes
- Clade: Angiosperms
- Clade: Eudicots
- Order: Caryophyllales
- Family: Cactaceae
- Subfamily: Cactoideae
- Genus: Armatocereus
- Species: A. ghiesbreghtii

Binomial name
- Armatocereus ghiesbreghtii (K.Schum.) F.Ritter 1981

Synonyms
- Cereus ghiesbreghtii K.Schum. 1897

Species of cactus

Armatocereus ghiesbreghtii is a species of Armatocereus from Peru.

== Description ==
This species features erect, branched, cylindrical stems that grow 2 to 6 meters tall. These light green stems are segmented, with each segment measuring 30 to 60 cm long and up to 15 cm in diameter, tapering at both ends. The stems possess 5 to 9 prominent ribs marked by deep indentations. Areoles on the stems bear brownish, needle-shaped spines, consisting of 1 to 4 central spines and 10 to 15 radial spines, each approximately 1 cm in length.

== Distribution ==
Armatocereus ghiesbreghtii is a tree-like cactus native to Peru, found in desert and dry scrub environments between 1200 and 2000 meters in elevation.

== Taxonomy ==
This species was first described as Cereus ghiesbreghtii by Karl Moritz Schumann in 1897, the species was later reclassified to the genus Armatocereus by Friedrich Ritter in 1981. The specific epithet honors French botanist Auguste Boniface Ghiesbreght.
