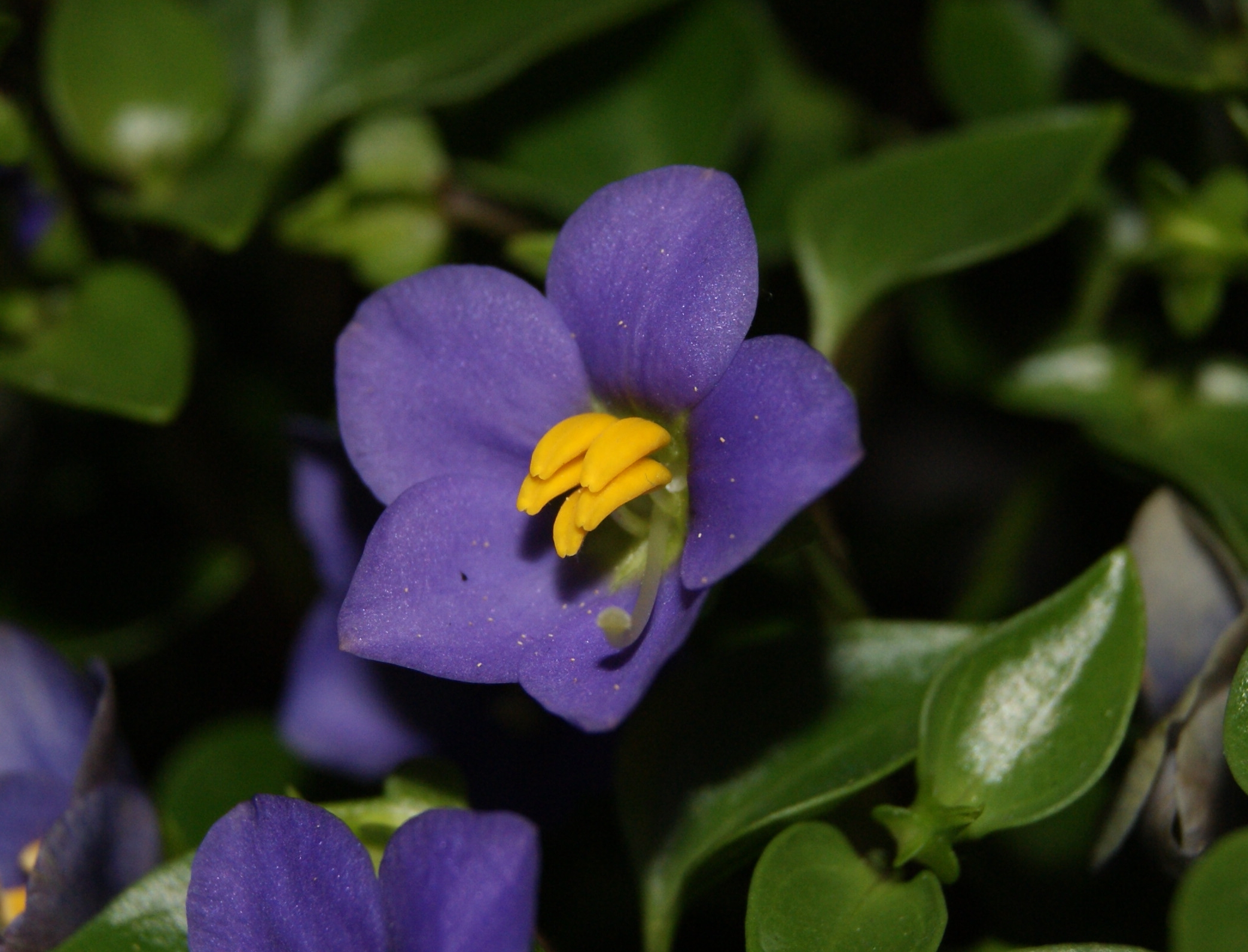

Conservation status
- Least Concern (IUCN 3.1)

Scientific classification
- Kingdom: Plantae
- Clade: Tracheophytes
- Clade: Angiosperms
- Clade: Eudicots
- Clade: Asterids
- Order: Gentianales
- Family: Gentianaceae
- Genus: Exacum
- Species: E. affine

Binomial name
- Exacum affine Balf.f. ex Regel

Synonyms
- Exacum gracilipes Balf.f.

= Exacum affine =

Species of plant

Exacum affine, known commercially as the Persian violet, is a species of plant in the family Gentianaceae. It is endemic to Socotra, part of Yemen, though its popularity and cultivation around the world have made it an occasional greenhouse weed. Its natural habitat is rocky areas. This is a small herbaceous biennial plant with dark green, ovate leaves. The small purple flowers have a yellow centre with fragrance.

== Cultivation ==
In the UK, Exacum affine has won the Royal Horticultural Society's Award of Garden Merit. This tender annual or biennial plant is sown in heat in early spring, and planted out when all danger of frost has passed (May or June, depending on the location).
