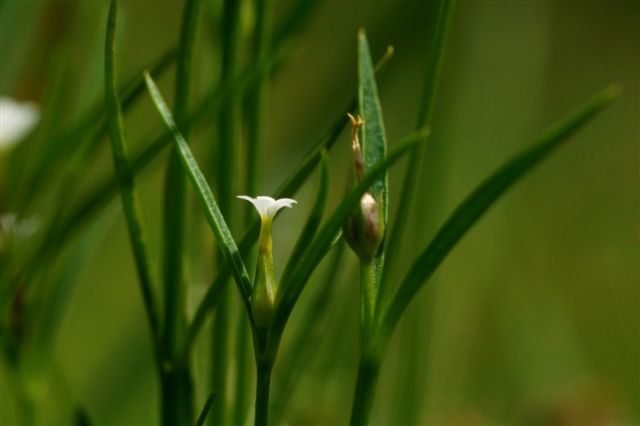
- Klackenbergia stricta

Scientific classification
- Kingdom: Plantae
- Clade: Tracheophytes
- Clade: Angiosperms
- Clade: Eudicots
- Clade: Asterids
- Order: Gentianales
- Family: Gentianaceae
- Tribe: Exaceae
- Genus: Klackenbergia; Kissling

Type species
- Klackenbergia stricta (Schinz) Kissling

= Klackenbergia =

Genus of flowering plants

Klackenbergia is a genus of flowering plants belonging to the gentian family (Gentianaceae) and the tribe Exaceae. It only contains two species, both endemic to Madagascar. They are notable for their inflorescence with characteristic long bracts and bracteoles and sub-sessile flowers arranged in axillary fascicules at each node.

The genus is named after Jens Klackenberg (1951-).

== Species ==
- Klackenbergia stricta (Schinz) Kissling
- Klackenbergia condensata (Klack.) Kissling
