= Walter Gardiner =

British botanist (1859-1941)

Walter Gardiner, FLS, FRS (1 September 1859–31 August 1941) was a British botanist. He was educated at Bedford School and at Clare College, Cambridge, and was a fellow there and lecturer in Botany at the university. He was a fellow of the Linnean Society of London, and was elected a fellow of the Royal Society in 1890. He was awarded the Royal Society's Royal Medal in 1898: "For his researches on the protoplasmic connection of the cells of vegetable tissues and on the minute histology of plants."
