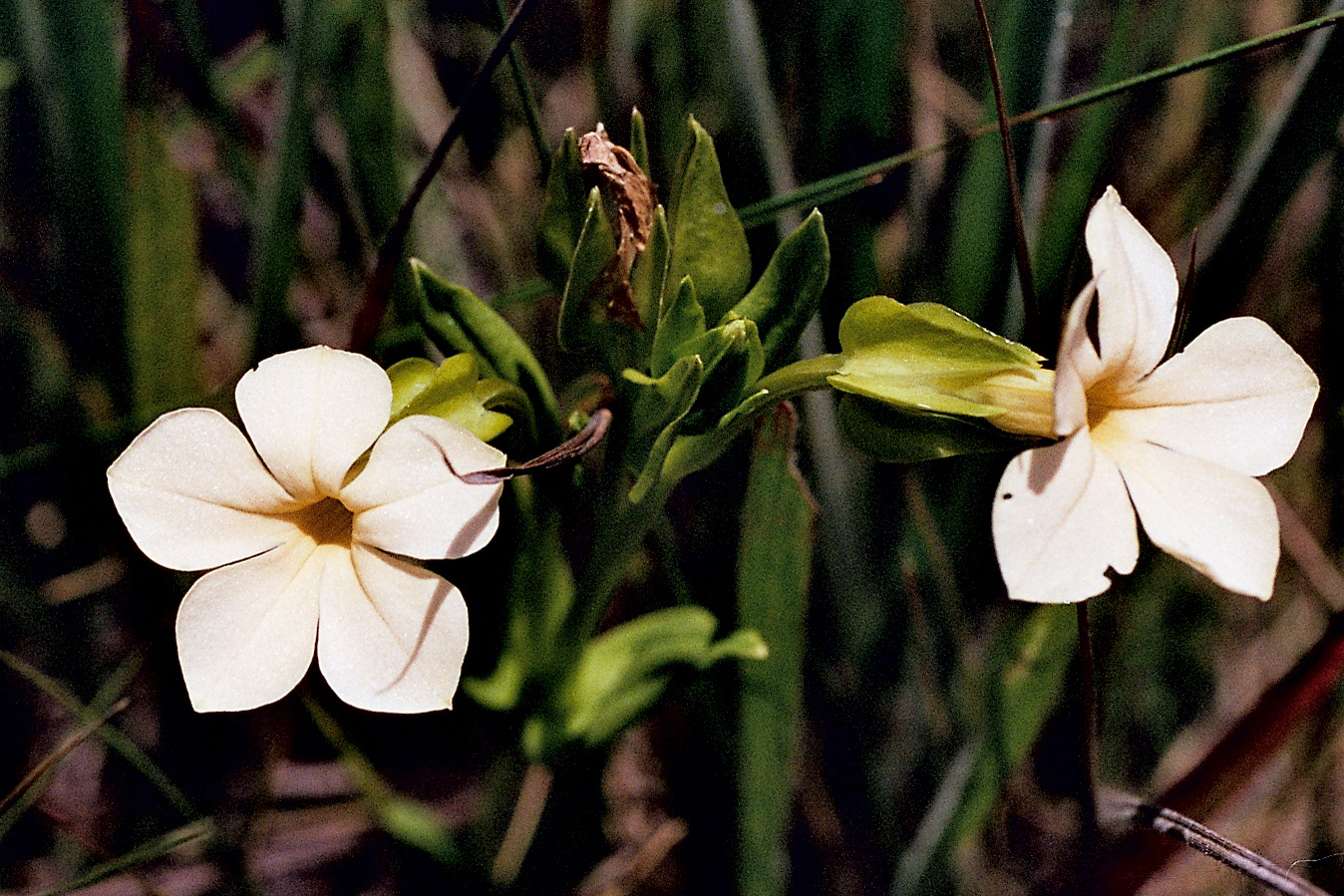
- Exochaenium grande

Scientific classification
- Kingdom: Plantae
- Clade: Tracheophytes
- Clade: Angiosperms
- Clade: Eudicots
- Clade: Asterids
- Order: Gentianales
- Family: Gentianaceae
- Tribe: Exaceae
- Genus: Exochaenium; Griseb.

Type species
- Exochaenium grande (E.Mey.) Griseb.

Species
- See species list below.

= Exochaenium =

Genus of flowering plants

The genus Exochaenium (23 species) is endemic to sub-Saharan Africa, with species occurring in most tropical and sub-tropical regions of the continent, particularly on the Katanga plateau (Angola, Democratic Republic of Congo and Zambia), with many extending to the Sudano-Zambesian and Guineo-Congolian regions. The genus is monophyletic and is used to study the variation and evolution of herkogamy.

== Species ==
- Exochaenium alatum (Paiva and Nogueira) Kissling
- Exochaenium baumianum (Gilg) Schinz
- Exochaenium caudatum (Paiva and Nogueira) Kissling
- Exochaenium clavatum (Paiva and Nogueira) Kissling
- Exochaenium debile Welw.
- Exochaenium dimidiatum (Sileshi) Kissling
- Exochaenium exiguum A.W.Hill
- Exochaenium fernandesianum (Paiva and Nogueira) Kissling
- Exochaenium gracile (Welw.) Schinz
- Exochaenium grande (E.Mey.) Griseb.
- Exochaenium hockii (De Wild.) Kissling
- Exochaenium lineariforme (Sileshi) Kissling
- Exochaenium macropterum (Sileshi) Kissling
- Exochaenium natalense (Schinz) Kissling and K.W.Grieve
- Exochaenium oliganthum (Gilg) Kissling
- Exochaenium perparvum (Sileshi) Kissling
- Exochaenium platypterum (Baker) Schinz
- Exochaenium primulaeflorum Welw.
- Exochaenium pumilum (Baker) Hill
- Exochaenium pygmaeum Milne-Redhead
- Exochaenium rotundifolium (Peter) Kissling
- Exochaenium teucszii (Schinz) Schinz
- Exochaenium wildemanianum (Boutique) Kissling
