= Lagenias =

Scientific classification
- Kingdom: Plantae
- Clade: Embryophytes
- Clade: Tracheophytes
- Clade: Spermatophytes
- Clade: Angiosperms
- Clade: Eudicots
- Clade: Asterids
- Order: Gentianales
- Family: Gentianaceae
- Tribe: Exaceae
- Genus: Lagenias; E.Mey.
- Species: L. pusillus

Binomial name
- Lagenias pusillus E.Mey.

Genus of flowering plants

Lagenias is a monotypic genus of flowering plant in the family Gentianaceae. It is endemic to the Cape Province of South Africa . It belongs to the tribe Exaceae of the Gentianaceae.

== Species ==
- Lagenias pusillus E. Mey.
