= Helia (disambiguation) =

Helia is an Australian lenders mortgage insurance provider.

It may also refer to:

== People ==
- Hélia Correia (born 1949), Portuguese novelist, playwright, poet and translator
- Helia Bravo Hollis (1901–2001), Mexican botanist
- Helia Molina (born 1947), Chilean physician, educator, and politician
- Helia Sohani, Iranian inline hockey player
- Helia Souza (born 1970), Brazilian volleyball player

== Organisms ==
- Elachista helia, a species of moth in the family Elachistidae
- Hamataliwa helia, a species of lynx spider in the family Oxyopidae
- Helia (moth), a genus of moths in the family Erebidae
- Helia (plant), a genus of plants in the family Gentianaceae

== Other uses ==
- Helia, a fictional character in Winx Club, an animated TV series

== See also ==
- Helias (disambiguation)
- Helie, a feminine given name
