= Comastoma pedunculatum =

Scientific classification
- Kingdom: Plantae
- Clade: Embryophytes
- Clade: Tracheophytes
- Clade: Angiosperms
- Clade: Eudicots
- Clade: Asterids
- Order: Gentianales
- Family: Gentianaceae
- Genus: Comastoma
- Species: C. pedunculatum

Binomial name
- Comastoma pedunculatum (Royle ex G.Don) Holub

Synonyms
- Gentiana pedunculata Royle ex G.Don; Gentianella pedunculata (Royle ex G.Don) Harry Sm. ex S.Nilsson

Species of plant

Comastoma pedunculatum, the stalked gentian, is a species of flowering plant in the family Gentianaceae. It is native to northern Pakistan, the Himalayas, Tibet, Qinghai, and central China. An annual or biennial, it is typically found growing by riversides and in high meadows at elevations from 3,200 to 4,800 m (10,000 to 16,000 ft).
