= Prepusa =

Prepusa is a genus name that may refer to:

- Prepusa (beetle), a type of ground beetle
- Prepusa (plant), a genus of Brazilian plants in the Gentian family.
