= Schultesia =

Schultesia may refer to the genera:

- Schultesia (cockroach) Roth, 1973 in the family Blaberidae
- Schultesia (plant) Mart. in the family Gentianaceae
- synonym of Wahlenbergia in the family Campanulaceae
