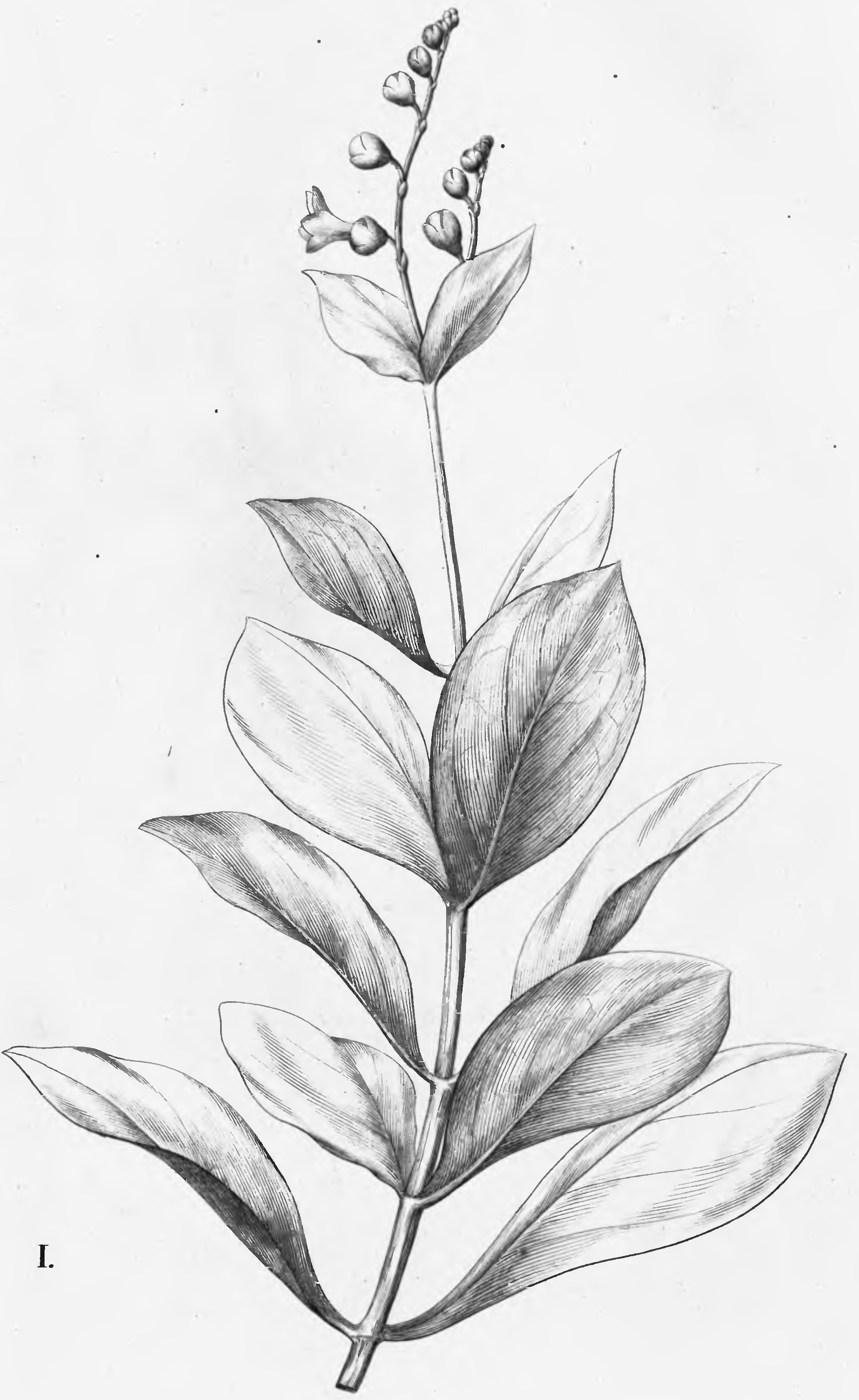
- Illustration accompanying the protologue of Lisianthus arboreus, the basionym of Adenolisianthus arboreus.

Scientific classification
- Kingdom: Plantae
- Clade: Tracheophytes
- Clade: Angiosperms
- Clade: Eudicots
- Clade: Asterids
- Order: Gentianales
- Family: Gentianaceae
- Tribe: Helieae
- Genus: Adenolisianthus; Gilg
- Species: A. arboreus

Binomial name
- Adenolisianthus arboreus (Spruce ex Progel) Gilg

= Adenolisianthus =

Genus of plants

Adenolisianthus is a plant genus in the gentian family (Gentianaceae), tribe Helieae. The name of the genus is derived from Greek roots meaning "gland-bearing and smooth flower". Only one species, Adenolisianthus arboreus, has been classified as part of this genus. It was first recognized as a separate genus in H.G.A.Engler & K.A.E.Prantl, Nat. Pflanzenfam. 4(2): 98 (1895). Until then, the species was treated as part of the genus Lisianthius.

== Habitat ==
Adenolisianthus arboreus is found in the river basins of the Rio Negro and the Rio Vaupes. Its area of distribution covers northwestern Brazil and the southern parts of Venezuela and Colombia. Adenolisianthus' primary habitat is lowland, white-sand savanna. It is found in the elevations between 0-800 meters. It is native to the Colombian departments of Amazonas, Caquetá, Guainía, Guaviare, Meta, and Vaupés.
