= Ghost plant =

Ghost plant is a common name for several plants and may refer to:

- Dendrophylax lindenii, an orchid known as the "American ghost orchid"
- Epipogium aphyllum, an orchid known as the "ghost orchid"
- Graptopetalum paraguayense, a succulent also known as Sedum weinbergii
- Monotropa uniflora, a parasitic heather
- Mohavea confertiflora, a North American plant known as the "ghost flower"
- Voyria, a genus of flowering plants known as "ghostplants"
