= Congolanthus =

Scientific classification
- Kingdom: Plantae
- Clade: Tracheophytes
- Clade: Angiosperms
- Clade: Eudicots
- Clade: Asterids
- Order: Gentianales
- Family: Gentianaceae
- Genus: Congolanthus; A.Raynal

Genus of flowering plants

Congolanthus is a genus of flowering plants belonging to the family Gentianaceae.

It was first described by French botanist Aline Marie Raynal. Its native range is Tropical Africa.

Species:

- Congolanthus longidens (N.E.Br.) A.Raynal
