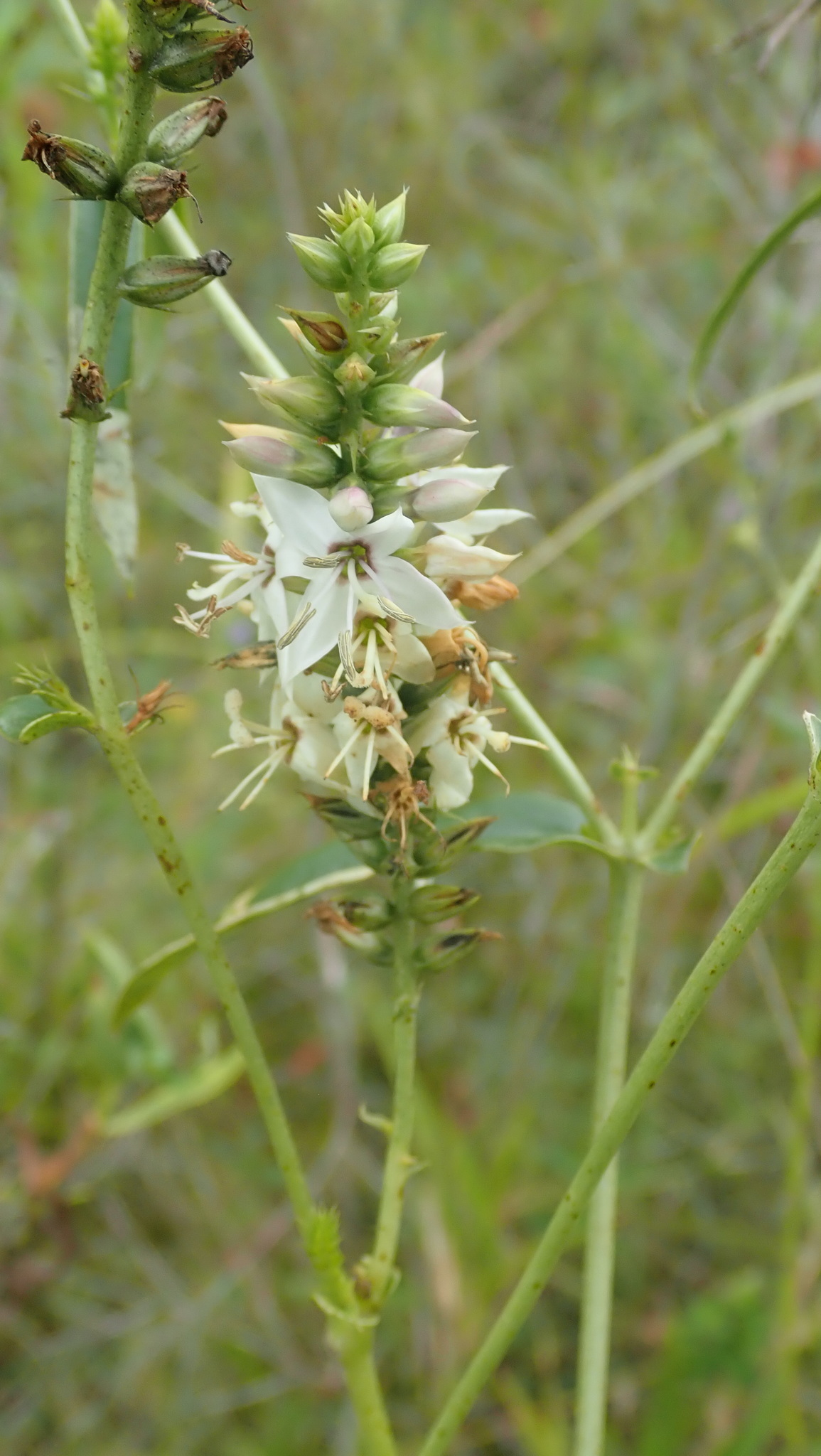

Scientific classification
- Kingdom: Plantae
- Clade: Tracheophytes
- Clade: Angiosperms
- Clade: Eudicots
- Clade: Asterids
- Order: Gentianales
- Family: Gentianaceae
- Genus: Coutoubea
- Species: C. spicata

Binomial name
- Coutoubea spicata (Aubl.) Kunth

= Coutoubea spicata =

Species of plant

Coutoubea spicata is a species of flowering plant from the genus Coutoubea.

== Description ==
Coutoubea spicata is a 1 m tall creamy-white flowered gentian. It is a bitter tonic, which in the 19th century was used as emmenagogues, anthelmintics, and for the removal of intestinal obstructions. More recently, this plant has been studied for its potential antidiabetic and antimalaria properties.
