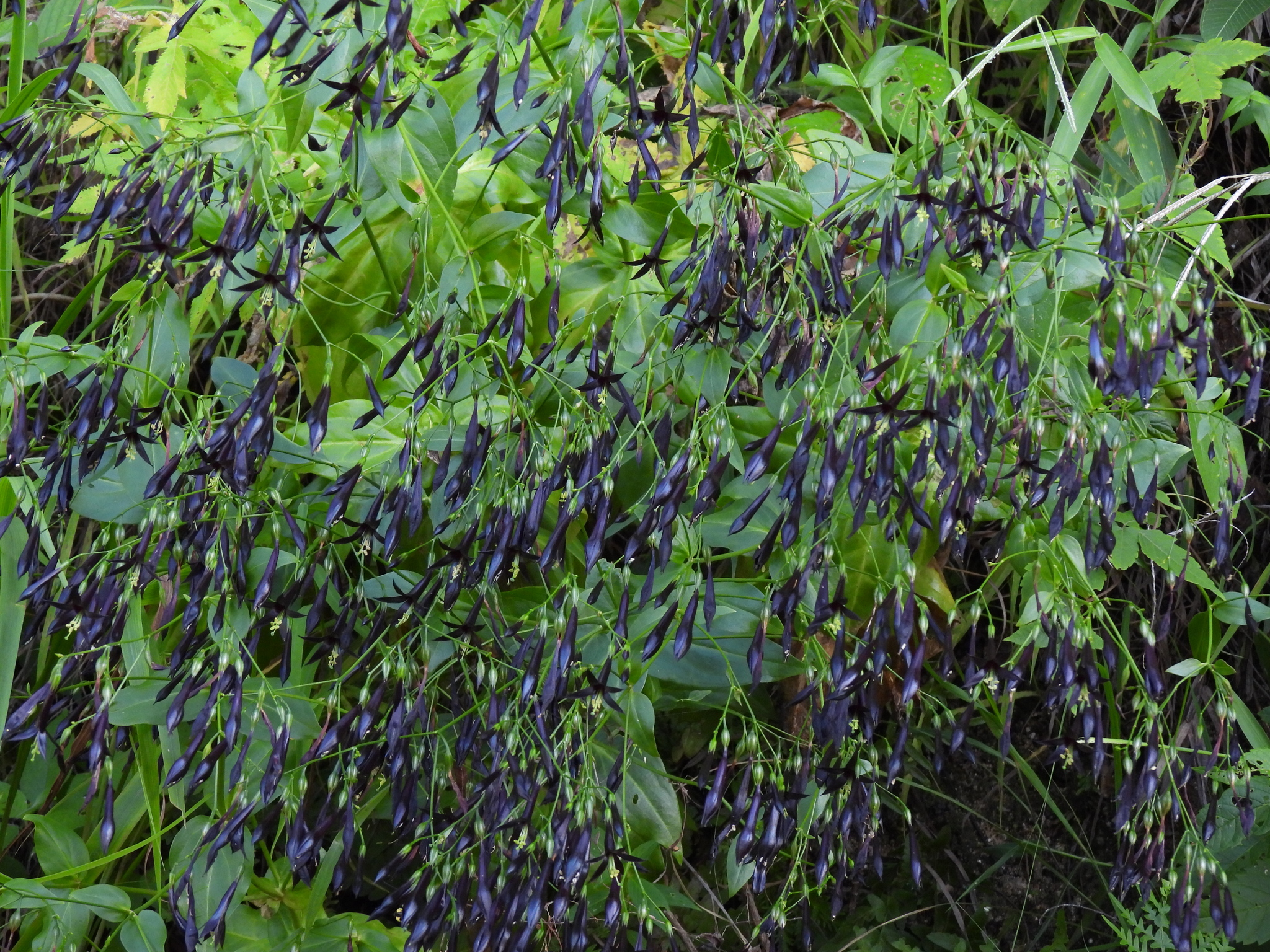
- Lisianthius nigrescens, Cañón del Sumidero, Chiapas, Mexico

Scientific classification
- Kingdom: Plantae
- Clade: Tracheophytes
- Clade: Angiosperms
- Clade: Eudicots
- Clade: Asterids
- Order: Gentianales
- Family: Gentianaceae
- Genus: Lisianthius
- Species: L. nigrescens

Binomial name
- Lisianthius nigrescens Schltdl. & Cham.

= Lisianthius nigrescens =

Species of plant

Lisianthius nigrescens is a shrub from southern Mexico and Guatemala belonging to the family Gentianaceae. Its Spanish common name is flor de muerte. It has extremely dark flowers, ranging from dark purple to nearly black. The flowers are as much as 23% anthocyanin pigment by weight.

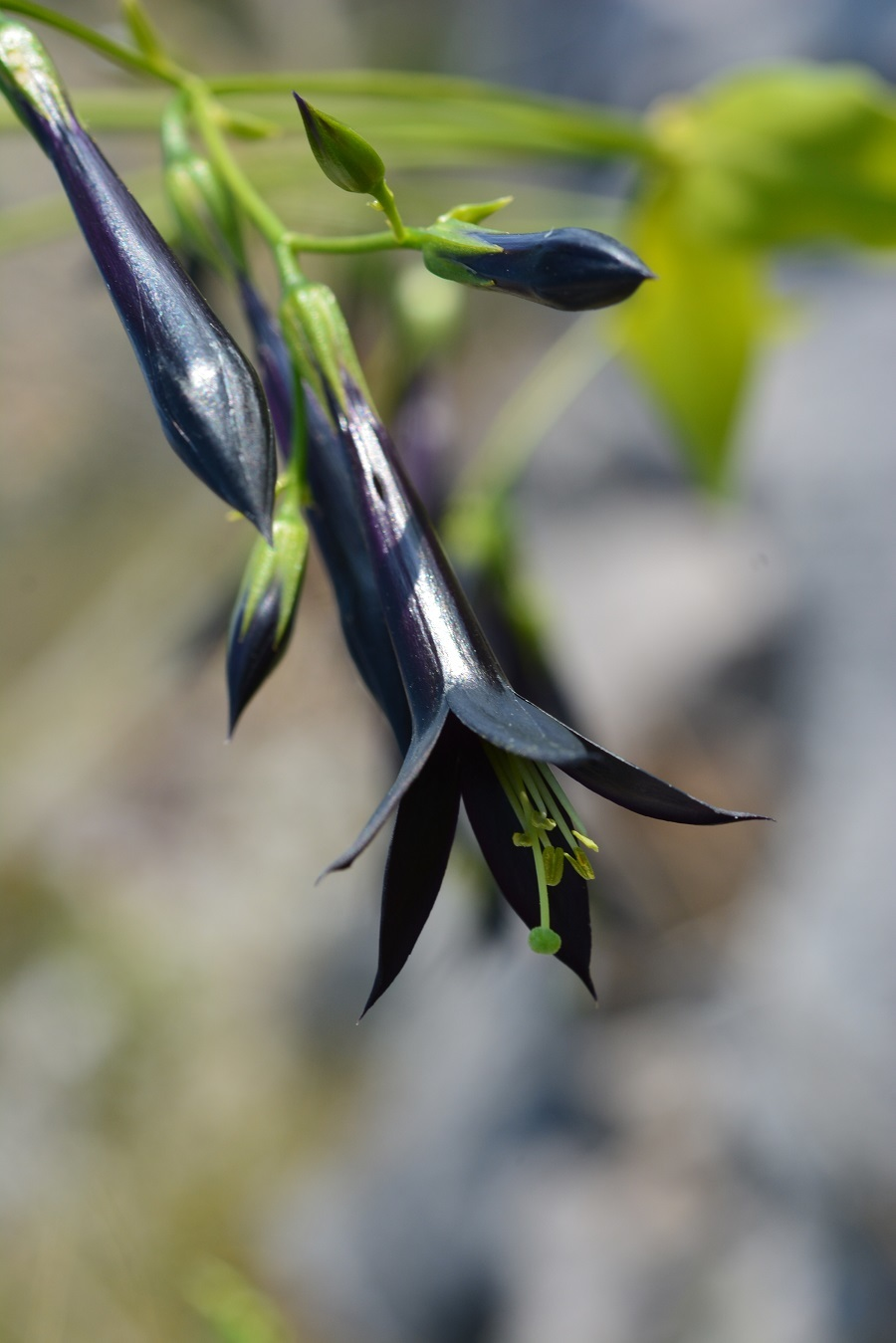
Close-up of the flowers
