= Oreonesion =

Scientific classification
- Kingdom: Plantae
- Clade: Tracheophytes
- Clade: Angiosperms
- Clade: Eudicots
- Clade: Asterids
- Order: Gentianales
- Family: Gentianaceae
- Genus: Oreonesion; A.Raynal
- Species: O. testui

Binomial name
- Oreonesion testui A.Raynal

Genus of plants

Oreonesion is a monotypic genus of flowering plants belonging to the family Gentianaceae. The only species is Oreonesion testui.

Its native range is Western Central Tropical Africa.
