= Heinrich August Jäschke =

German Tibetologist and missionary (1817–1883)

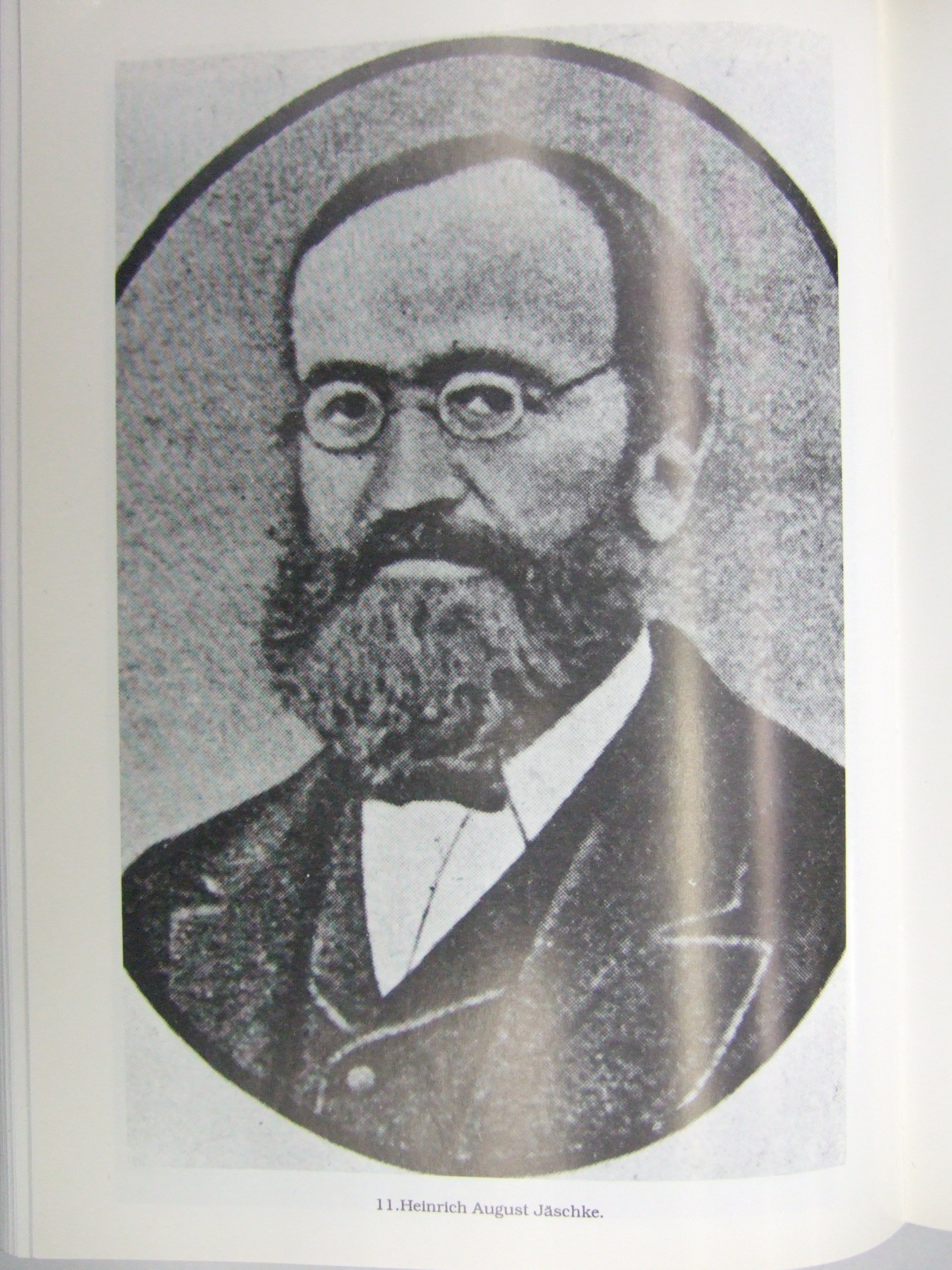
Heinrich August Jäschke

Heinrich August Jäschke (17 May 1817 in Herrnhut – 24 September 1883) was a German Tibetologist missionary and Bible translator. From 1857 to 1868 he was missionary of the Herrnhuter Brüdergemeine (the Moravian Church or Moravian Brethren) in Kyelang, Lahaul District and Spiti in North India.

Jäschke has been called "the most distinguished linguist in the whole history of the Moravian Church" by James Hutton in his A History of the Moravian Missions (1923).

== Early life and career ==
Heinrich August Jäschke was born on May 17, 1817, in Herrnhut, Germany. He attended Moravian schools, where he stood out for his remarkable gift for learning new languages. His ties to Moravian schools continued in adult life as he taught in various schools in Germany and Denmark. In 1847, he became co-director of the Moravian boarding schools in Niesky, Germany. The following year, he was ordained.

== Tibetan Mission ==
Jäschke's gift for language made him an ideal choice for the Moravian mission in Western Tibet. So in 1856 Jäschke joined two missionaries, Wilhelm Heyde and Eduard Pagel, in what is today northern India.

== Works ==
- A Tibetan-English Dictionary (1881)
- Tibetan Grammar (1883)
- New Testament in Tibetan

== Honours ==
In 1870, botanist Federico Kurtz named a genus of flowering plants from Central Asia (belonging to the family Gentianaceae), as Jaeschkea in his honour.
