= Djaloniella =

Scientific classification
- Kingdom: Plantae
- Clade: Tracheophytes
- Clade: Angiosperms
- Clade: Eudicots
- Clade: Asterids
- Order: Gentianales
- Family: Gentianaceae
- Genus: Djaloniella; P.Taylor
- Species: D. ypsilostyla

Binomial name
- Djaloniella ypsilostyla P.Taylor

Genus of plants

Djaloniella is a monotypic genus of flowering plants belonging to the family Gentianaceae. The only species is Djaloniella ypsilostyla.

Its native range is Western Tropical Africa.
