= Megacodon =

Scientific classification
- Kingdom: Plantae
- Clade: Tracheophytes
- Clade: Angiosperms
- Clade: Eudicots
- Clade: Asterids
- Order: Gentianales
- Family: Gentianaceae
- Genus: Megacodon (Hemsl.) Harry Sm.

Genus of plants

Megacodon is a genus of flowering plants belonging to the family Gentianaceae.

Its native range is the Central Himalayas to Southern Central China.

== Species ==
Species:

- Megacodon stylophorus (C.B.Clarke) Harry Sm.
- Megacodon venosus (Hemsl.) Harry Sm.
