= Roraimaea =

Scientific classification
- Kingdom: Plantae
- Clade: Tracheophytes
- Clade: Angiosperms
- Clade: Eudicots
- Clade: Asterids
- Order: Gentianales
- Family: Gentianaceae
- Genus: Roraimaea; Struwe, S.Nilsson & V.A.Albert

Genus of plants

Roraimaea is a genus of flowering plants belonging to the family Gentianaceae.

Its native range is Northern Brazil.

Species:

- Roraimaea aurantiaca Struwe, S.Nilsson & V.A.Albert – native to white sand savannas (Campinarana) in Roraima state of Brazil.
- Roraimaea coccinea (Steyerm. ex Struwe, S.Nilsson & V.A.Albert) Struwe, S.Nilsson & V.A.Albert – native to the Sierra de la Neblina of Venezuela.
