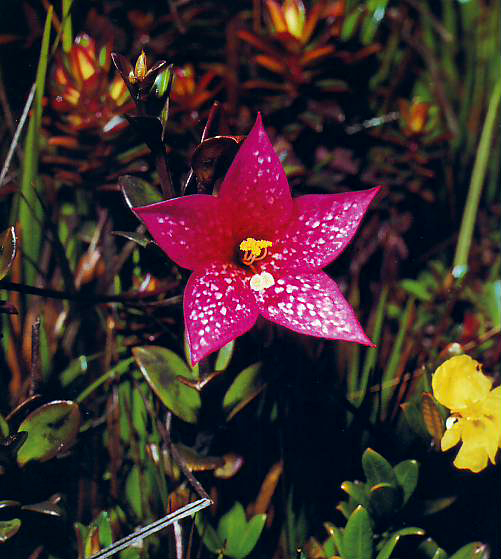
- Celiantha imthurniana

Scientific classification
- Kingdom: Plantae
- Clade: Tracheophytes
- Clade: Angiosperms
- Clade: Eudicots
- Clade: Asterids
- Order: Gentianales
- Family: Gentianaceae
- Genus: Celiantha; Maguire

= Celiantha =

Genus of flowering plants

Celiantha is a genus of flowering plants belonging to the family Gentianaceae.

Its native range is Guyana Highlands.

Species:

- Celiantha bella Maguire & Steyerm.
- Celiantha chimantensis (Steyerm. & Maguire) Maguire
- Celiantha imthurniana (Oliv.) Maguire
