= Tubella =

Scientific classification
- Kingdom: Plantae
- Clade: Tracheophytes
- Clade: Angiosperms
- Clade: Eudicots
- Clade: Asterids
- Order: Gentianales
- Family: Gentianaceae
- Genus: Tubella; Archila (2006)
- Species: T. inconspicua

Binomial name
- Tubella inconspicua Archila (2006)

Genus of flowering plants

Tubella inconspicua is a species of flowering plant in the family Gentianaceae. It is the sole species in genus Tubella. It is endemic to El Salvador.
