= Pycnosphaera =

Scientific classification
- Kingdom: Plantae
- Clade: Tracheophytes
- Clade: Angiosperms
- Clade: Eudicots
- Clade: Asterids
- Order: Gentianales
- Family: Gentianaceae
- Genus: Pycnosphaera; Gilg
- Species: P. buchananii

Binomial name
- Pycnosphaera buchananii (Baker) N.E.Br.

Genus of plants

Pycnosphaera is a monotypic genus of flowering plants belonging to the family Gentianaceae. The only species is Pycnosphaera buchananii.

Its native range is Tropical Africa to Botswana.
