= Crawfurdia =

Scientific classification
- Kingdom: Plantae
- Clade: Tracheophytes
- Clade: Angiosperms
- Clade: Eudicots
- Clade: Asterids
- Order: Gentianales
- Family: Gentianaceae
- Genus: Crawfurdia; Wall.

Genus of flowering plants

Crawfurdia is a genus of flowering plants belonging to the family Gentianaceae.

Its native range is Eastern Himalaya to China.

Species:

- Crawfurdia angustata C.B.Clarke
- Crawfurdia arunachalensis S.S.Dash, Gogoi & A.A.Mao
- Crawfurdia bomareoides (C.Marquand) H.Sm.
- Crawfurdia campanulacea Wall. & Griff. ex C.B.Clarke
- Crawfurdia championii (Gardner) Alston
- Crawfurdia crawfurdioides (Marquand) H.Sm.
- Crawfurdia delavayi Franch.
- Crawfurdia dimidiata (Marquand) H.Sm.
- Crawfurdia gracilipes H.Sm.
- Crawfurdia lobatilimba W.L.Cheng
- Crawfurdia maculaticaulis C.Y.Wu ex C.J.Wu
- Crawfurdia nyingchiensis K.Yao & W.L.Cheng
- Crawfurdia poilanei Hul
- Crawfurdia pricei (Marquand) H.Sm.
- Crawfurdia puberula C.B.Clarke
- Crawfurdia semialata (Marquand) H.Sm.
- Crawfurdia sessiliflora (C.Marquand) H.Sm.
- Crawfurdia sinkuensis (C.Marquand) H.Sm.
- Crawfurdia speciosa Wall.
- Crawfurdia thibetica Franch.
- Crawfurdia tonkinensis J.Murata ex Hul
- Crawfurdia tsangshanensis C.J.Wu
