= Lomatogoniopsis =

Scientific classification
- Kingdom: Plantae
- Clade: Tracheophytes
- Clade: Angiosperms
- Clade: Eudicots
- Clade: Asterids
- Order: Gentianales
- Family: Gentianaceae
- Genus: Lomatogoniopsis; T.N.Ho & S.W.Liu

Genus of plants

Lomatogoniopsis is a genus of flowering plants belonging to the family Gentianaceae.

Its native range is Eastern Himalaya to Western and Southern Central China.

Species:

- Lomatogoniopsis alpina T.N.Ho & S.W.Liu
- Lomatogoniopsis galeiformis T.N.Ho & S.W.Liu
- Lomatogoniopsis ovatifolia T.N.Ho & S.W.Liu
