= Curtia =

Scientific classification
- Kingdom: Plantae
- Clade: Tracheophytes
- Clade: Angiosperms
- Clade: Eudicots
- Clade: Asterids
- Order: Gentianales
- Family: Gentianaceae
- Genus: Curtia; Cham. & Schltdl.

Genus of flowering plants

Curtia is a genus of flowering plants belonging to the family, Gentianaceae.

Its native range is Southern Tropical America.

Species:

- Curtia ayangannae L.Cobb & Jans.-Jac.
- Curtia conferta (Mart.) Knobl.
- Curtia confusa Grothe & Maas
- Curtia diffusa Cham.
- Curtia intermedia (Progel) Knobl.
- Curtia malmeana Gilg
- Curtia obtusifolia (Benth.) Knobl.
- Curtia patula (Mart.) Knobl.
- Curtia pusilla (Griseb.) Knobl.
- Curtia tenuifolia (Aubl.) Knobl.
- Curtia verticillaris (Spreng.) Knobl.
