= Metagentiana =

Scientific classification
- Kingdom: Plantae
- Clade: Tracheophytes
- Clade: Angiosperms
- Clade: Eudicots
- Clade: Asterids
- Order: Gentianales
- Family: Gentianaceae
- Genus: Metagentiana; T.N.Ho & S.W.Liu

Genus of plants

Metagentiana is a genus of flowering plants belonging to the family Gentianaceae.

Its native range is Central and Southern China to Northern Indo-China.

Species:

- Metagentiana alata (T.N.Ho) T.N.Ho & S.W.Liu
- Metagentiana australis (Craib) T.N.Ho & S.W.Liu
- Metagentiana eurycolpa (C.Marquand) T.N.Ho & S.W.Liu
- Metagentiana expansa (Harry Sm.) T.N.Ho & S.W.Liu
- Metagentiana gentilis (Franch.) T.N.Ho & S.W.Liu
- Metagentiana leptoclada (Balf.f. & Forrest) T.N.Ho & S.W.Liu
- Metagentiana melvillei (S.Moore) T.N.Ho & S.W.Liu
- Metagentiana primuliflora (Franch.) T.N.Ho & S.W.Liu
- Metagentiana pterocalyx (Franch.) T.N.Ho & S.W.Liu
- Metagentiana rhodantha (Franch.) T.N.Ho & S.W.Liu
- Metagentiana serra (Franch.) T.N.Ho, S.W.Liu & Shi L.Chen
- Metagentiana villifera (H.W.Li ex T.N.Ho) T.N.Ho & S.W.Liu
