= Sinogentiana =

Scientific classification
- Kingdom: Plantae
- Clade: Tracheophytes
- Clade: Angiosperms
- Clade: Eudicots
- Clade: Asterids
- Order: Gentianales
- Family: Gentianaceae
- Genus: Sinogentiana; Adr.Favre & Y.M.Yuan

Genus of plants

Sinogentiana is a genus of flowering plants belonging to the family Gentianaceae.

Its native range is China.

Species:

- Sinogentiana souliei (Franch.) Adr.Favre & Y.M.Yuan
- Sinogentiana striata (Maxim.) Adr.Favre & Y.M.Yuan
