= Karina tayloriana =

Scientific classification
- Kingdom: Plantae
- Clade: Tracheophytes
- Clade: Angiosperms
- Clade: Eudicots
- Clade: Asterids
- Order: Gentianales
- Family: Gentianaceae
- Genus: Karina; Boutique (1971)
- Species: K. tayloriana

Binomial name
- Karina tayloriana Boutique (1971)

Species of flowering plant

Karina tayloriana is a species of flowering plant in the family Gentianaceae. It is an annual native to the southern Democratic Republic of the Congo. It is the sole species in genus Karina.
