= Lagenanthus =

Scientific classification
- Kingdom: Plantae
- Clade: Tracheophytes
- Clade: Angiosperms
- Clade: Eudicots
- Clade: Asterids
- Order: Gentianales
- Family: Gentianaceae
- Genus: Lagenanthus; Gilg
- Species: L. princeps

Binomial name
- Lagenanthus princeps (Lindl.) Gilg

Genus of plants

Lagenanthus is a monotypic genus of flowering plants belonging to the family Gentianaceae. The only species is Lagenanthus princeps.

Its native range is Colombia to Venezuela.
