= Saccifolium =

Scientific classification
- Kingdom: Plantae
- Clade: Tracheophytes
- Clade: Angiosperms
- Clade: Eudicots
- Clade: Asterids
- Order: Gentianales
- Family: Gentianaceae
- Genus: Saccifolium; Maguire & Pires
- Species: S. bandeirae

Binomial name
- Saccifolium bandeirae Maguire & Pires

Genus of plants

Saccifolium is a monotypic genus of flowering plants belonging to the family Gentianaceae. The only species is Saccifolium bandeirae.

Its native range is Venezuela to Northern Brazil.
