= Aripuana =

Scientific classification
- Kingdom: Plantae
- Clade: Tracheophytes
- Clade: Angiosperms
- Clade: Eudicots
- Clade: Asterids
- Order: Gentianales
- Family: Gentianaceae
- Tribe: Helieae
- Genus: Aripuana; Struwe, Maas & V.A.Albert
- Species: A. cullmaniorum

Binomial name
- Aripuana cullmaniorum Struwe, Maas & V.A.Albert

Genus of plants

Aripuana is a plant genus in the gentian family, tribe Helieae, subclade Symbolanthus. The genus is named after the Aripuanã River in central Brazil, where it is found.

Only one species, Aripuana cullmaniorum, has been classified as part of this genus. It is named for Lewis B. Cullman and Dorothy Cullman, philanthropists and supporters of the New York Botanical Garden. It is found in the southeastern part of Amazonas state, in a small area near the village of Nova Aripuanã Prainha along the Aripuanã River. Aripuana's primary habitat is lowland, white-sand savanna.
