= Veratrilla =

Scientific classification
- Kingdom: Plantae
- Clade: Tracheophytes
- Clade: Angiosperms
- Clade: Eudicots
- Clade: Asterids
- Order: Gentianales
- Family: Gentianaceae
- Genus: Veratrilla; Franch.

Genus of flowering plants

Veratrilla is a genus of flowering plants belonging to the family Gentianaceae.

Its native range is Himalaya to Southern Central China.

Species:

- Veratrilla baillonii Franch.
- Veratrilla burkilliana (W.W.Sm.) Harry Sm.
