= Jaeschkea =

Scientific classification
- Kingdom: Plantae
- Clade: Tracheophytes
- Clade: Angiosperms
- Clade: Eudicots
- Clade: Asterids
- Order: Gentianales
- Family: Gentianaceae
- Genus: Jaeschkea; Kurz

Genus of plants

Jaeschkea is a genus of flowering plants belonging to the family Gentianaceae.

Its native range is Afghanistan to Himalaya and Tibet. It is found in Afghanistan, East Himalaya, Nepal, Pakistan, Tibet and West Himalaya.

The genus name of Jaeschkea is in honour of Heinrich August Jäschke (1817–1883), a German Tibetologist missionary and Bible translator. It was first described and published in J. Asiat. Soc. Bengal, Pt. 2, Nat. Hist. Vol.39 on page 230 in 1870.

== Known species ==
According to Kew:

- Jaeschkea canaliculata (Royle ex G.Don) Knobl.
- Jaeschkea microsperma C.B.Clarke
- Jaeschkea oligosperma Knobl.
