= Exaculum =

Scientific classification
- Kingdom: Plantae
- Clade: Tracheophytes
- Clade: Angiosperms
- Clade: Eudicots
- Clade: Asterids
- Order: Gentianales
- Family: Gentianaceae
- Genus: Exaculum; Caruel
- Species: E. pusillum

Binomial name
- Exaculum pusillum (Lam.) Caruel

Genus of plants

Exaculum is a monotypic genus of flowering plants belonging to the family Gentianaceae. The only species is Exaculum pusillum.

Its native range is Southwestern Europe to Western and Central Mediterranean.
