= Hockinia =

Scientific classification
- Kingdom: Plantae
- Clade: Tracheophytes
- Clade: Angiosperms
- Clade: Eudicots
- Clade: Asterids
- Order: Gentianales
- Family: Gentianaceae
- Genus: Hockinia; Gardner
- Species: H. montana

Binomial name
- Hockinia montana Gardner

Synonyms
- Anacolus Griseb.

Genus of plants

Hockinia is a monotypic genus of flowering plants belonging to the family Gentianaceae. The only species is Hockinia montana. It is native to south-eastern Brazil.

The genus name of Hockinia is in honour of George Curnow Hockin (1812–1890), friend of the author of the genus in Rio de Janeiro, Brazil, and also his brother John Hockin (1810–1893), an amateur botanist in Dominica. The Latin specific epithet of montana means "of the mountains". Both genus and species were first described and published in London J. Bot. Vol.2 on page 12 in 1843.
