= Chorisepalum =

Scientific classification
- Kingdom: Plantae
- Clade: Tracheophytes
- Clade: Angiosperms
- Clade: Eudicots
- Clade: Asterids
- Order: Gentianales
- Family: Gentianaceae
- Genus: Chorisepalum; Gleason & Wodehouse

Genus of flowering plants

Chorisepalum is a genus of flowering plants belonging to the family Gentianaceae.

Its native range is Guyana Highlands.

Species:

- Chorisepalum carnosum Ewan
- Chorisepalum ovatum Gleason
- Chorisepalum psychotrioides Ewan
- Chorisepalum rotundifolium Ewan
- Chorisepalum sipapoanum (Maguire) Struwe & V.A.Albert
