= Picrophloeus =

Scientific classification
- Kingdom: Plantae
- Clade: Tracheophytes
- Clade: Angiosperms
- Clade: Eudicots
- Clade: Asterids
- Order: Gentianales
- Family: Gentianaceae
- Genus: Picrophloeus; Blume

Genus of plants

Picrophloeus is a genus of flowering plants belonging to the family Gentianaceae.

Its native range is Malesia to New Guinea.

Species:

- Picrophloeus belukar (K.M.Wong & Sugau) K.M.Wong
- Picrophloeus collinus (K.M.Wong & Sugau) K.M.Wong
- Picrophloeus javanensis Blume
- Picrophloeus rugulosus (K.M.Wong & Sugau) K.M.Wong
