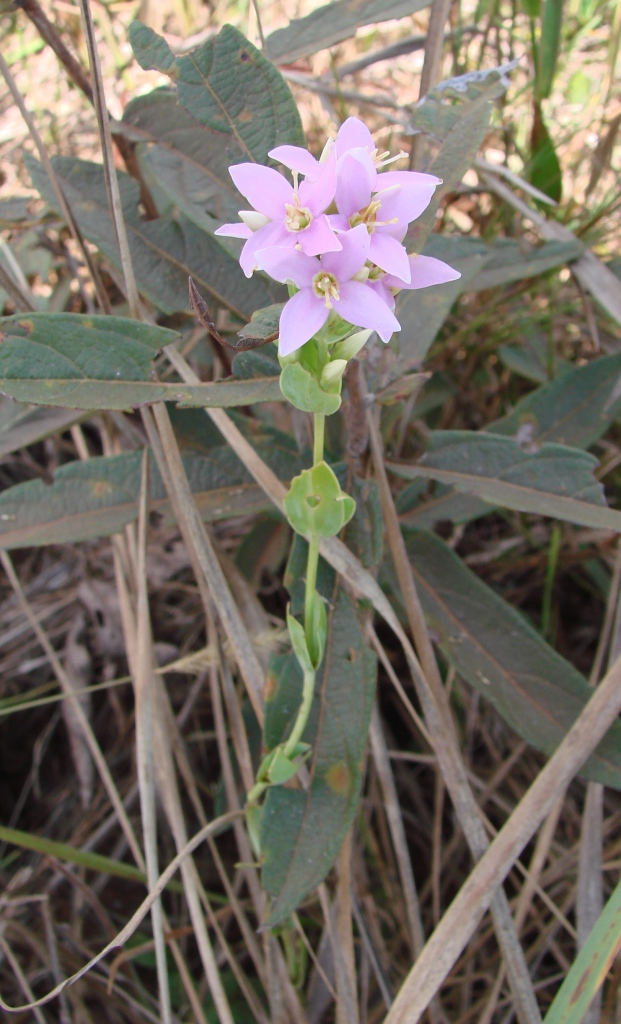

Scientific classification
- Kingdom: Plantae
- Clade: Tracheophytes
- Clade: Angiosperms
- Clade: Eudicots
- Clade: Asterids
- Order: Gentianales
- Family: Gentianaceae
- Genus: Deianira; Cham. & Schltdl. (1826)

Species
- 7; see text

Synonyms
- Callopisma Mart. (1827)

= Deianira (plant) =

Genus of flowering plants

Deianira is a genus of flowering plants in the family Gentianaceae. It includes seven species native to Brazil and Bolivia.

== Species ==
Seven species are accepted.

- Deianira chiquitana Herzog
- Deianira cordifolia (Lhotsky ex Griseb.) Malme
- Deianira cyathifolia Barb.Rodr.
- Deianira damazioi E.F.Guim.
- Deianira erubescens Cham. & Schltdl.
- Deianira nervosa Cham. & Schltdl.
- Deianira pallescens Cham. & Schltdl.
