= Purdieanthus =

Scientific classification
- Kingdom: Plantae
- Clade: Tracheophytes
- Clade: Angiosperms
- Clade: Eudicots
- Clade: Asterids
- Order: Gentianales
- Family: Gentianaceae
- Genus: Purdieanthus; Gilg
- Species: P. pulcher

Binomial name
- Purdieanthus pulcher (Hook.) Gilg

Synonyms
- Helia pulchra (Hook.) Kuntze; Lehmanniella pulchra (Hook.) J.E.Simonis ex Maas; Lisianthius pulcher Hook.

Genus of plants

Purdieanthus is a monotypic genus of flowering plants belonging to the family Gentianaceae. The only known species is Purdieanthus pulcher.

It is native to Colombia.

The genus name of Purdieanthus is in honour of William Purdie (c. 1817 – 1857), a Scottish gardener at botanical gardens in Edinburgh and Trinidad. He collected plants in Jamaica, Colombia and Venezuela. The Latin specific epithet of pulcher means beautiful.It is derived from feminine pulchra or neuter pulchrum. Both the genus and the species were first described and published in H.G.A.Engler & K.A.E.Prantl, Nat. Pflanzenfam. Vol.4 (Issue 2) on page 99 in 1895.
