= Kuepferia =

Scientific classification
- Kingdom: Plantae
- Clade: Tracheophytes
- Clade: Angiosperms
- Clade: Eudicots
- Clade: Asterids
- Order: Gentianales
- Family: Gentianaceae
- Genus: Kuepferia; Adr.Favre

Genus of plants

Kuepferia is a genus of flowering plants belonging to the family Gentianaceae.

Its native range stretches from (East and West) Himalaya to southern Central China. It is also found in Myanmar, Nepal and Tibet.

The genus name of Kuepferia is in honour of Philippe Küpfer (b. 1942), Swiss professor of botany at the University of Neuchâtel and also specialist in Gentianaceae and Ranunculaceae. It was first described and published in Taxon Vol.63 on page 349 in 2014.

== Known species ==
According to Kew:

- Kuepferia caryophyllea (Harry Sm.) Adr.Favre
- Kuepferia chateri (T.N.Ho) Adr.Favre
- Kuepferia damyonensis (C.Marquand) Adr.Favre
- Kuepferia decorata (Diels) Adr.Favre
- Kuepferia doxiongshangensis (T.N.Ho) Adr.Favre
- Kuepferia hicksii (Harry Sm.) Adr.Favre
- Kuepferia infelix (C.B.Clarke) Adr.Favre
- Kuepferia kanchii D.Maity, S.K.Dey & Adr.Favre
- Kuepferia leucantha (Harry Sm.) Adr.Favre
- Kuepferia masonii (T.N.Ho) Adr.Favre
- Kuepferia otophora (Franch.) Adr.Favre
- Kuepferia otophoroides (Harry Sm.) Adr.Favre
- Kuepferia pringlei D.Maity & S.K.Dey
- Kuepferia sichitoensis (C.Marquand) Adr.Favre
