= Senaea =

Scientific classification
- Kingdom: Plantae
- Clade: Tracheophytes
- Clade: Angiosperms
- Clade: Eudicots
- Clade: Asterids
- Order: Gentianales
- Family: Gentianaceae
- Genus: Senaea; Taub.

Genus of plants

Senaea is a genus of flowering plants belonging to the family Gentianaceae.

It is native to south eastern Brazil.

The genus name of Senaea is named in honour of Joaquim Cândido da Costa Sena (1852–1919), a Brazilian plant collector and geologist. It was first described and published in Bot. Jahrb. Syst. Vol.17 on page 515 in 1893.

Known species, according to Kew:

- Senaea coerulea Taub.
- Senaea janeirensis Brade
