= Neurotheca =

Scientific classification
- Kingdom: Plantae
- Clade: Tracheophytes
- Clade: Angiosperms
- Clade: Eudicots
- Clade: Asterids
- Order: Gentianales
- Family: Gentianaceae
- Genus: Neurotheca; Salisb. ex Benth. & Hook.f.

Genus of plants

Neurotheca is a genus of flowering plants belonging to the family Gentianaceae.

Its native range is Northern South America to Brazil, Tropical and Southern Africa, and Madagascar.

== Species ==
Species:

- Neurotheca congolana De Wild. & T.Durand
- Neurotheca corymbosa Hua
- Neurotheca loeselioides (Spruce ex Progel) Baill.
