= Calolisianthus =

Scientific classification
- Kingdom: Plantae
- Clade: Tracheophytes
- Clade: Angiosperms
- Clade: Eudicots
- Clade: Asterids
- Order: Gentianales
- Family: Gentianaceae
- Genus: Calolisianthus; Gilg

Genus of flowering plants

Calolisianthus is a genus of flowering plants belonging to the family Gentianaceae.

Its native range is Brazil.

Species:

- Calolisianthus amplissimus (Mart.) Gilg;
- Calolisianthus pedunculatus (Cham. & Schltdl.) Gilg.
