= Sinoswertia =

Scientific classification
- Kingdom: Plantae
- Clade: Tracheophytes
- Clade: Angiosperms
- Clade: Eudicots
- Clade: Asterids
- Order: Gentianales
- Family: Gentianaceae
- Genus: Sinoswertia; T.N.Ho, S.W.Liu & J.Q.Liu
- Species: S. tetraptera

Binomial name
- Sinoswertia tetraptera (Maxim.) T.N.Ho, S.W.Liu & J.Q.Liu

Genus of plants

Sinoswertia is a monotypic genus of flowering plants belonging to the family Gentianaceae. The only species is Sinoswertia tetraptera.

Its native range is Western and Central China.
