= Xestaea =

Scientific classification
- Kingdom: Plantae
- Clade: Tracheophytes
- Clade: Angiosperms
- Clade: Eudicots
- Clade: Asterids
- Order: Gentianales
- Family: Gentianaceae
- Tribe: Chironieae
- Genus: Xestaea; Griseb.

Genus of flowering plants

Xestaea is a genus of flowering plants belonging to the family Gentianaceae.

Its native range is Southern Mexico to Venezuela.

Species:

- Xestaea lisianthoides Griseb.
