= Tetrapollinia =

Scientific classification
- Kingdom: Plantae
- Clade: Tracheophytes
- Clade: Angiosperms
- Clade: Eudicots
- Clade: Asterids
- Order: Gentianales
- Family: Gentianaceae
- Genus: Tetrapollinia; Maguire & B.M.Boom

Genus of flowering plants

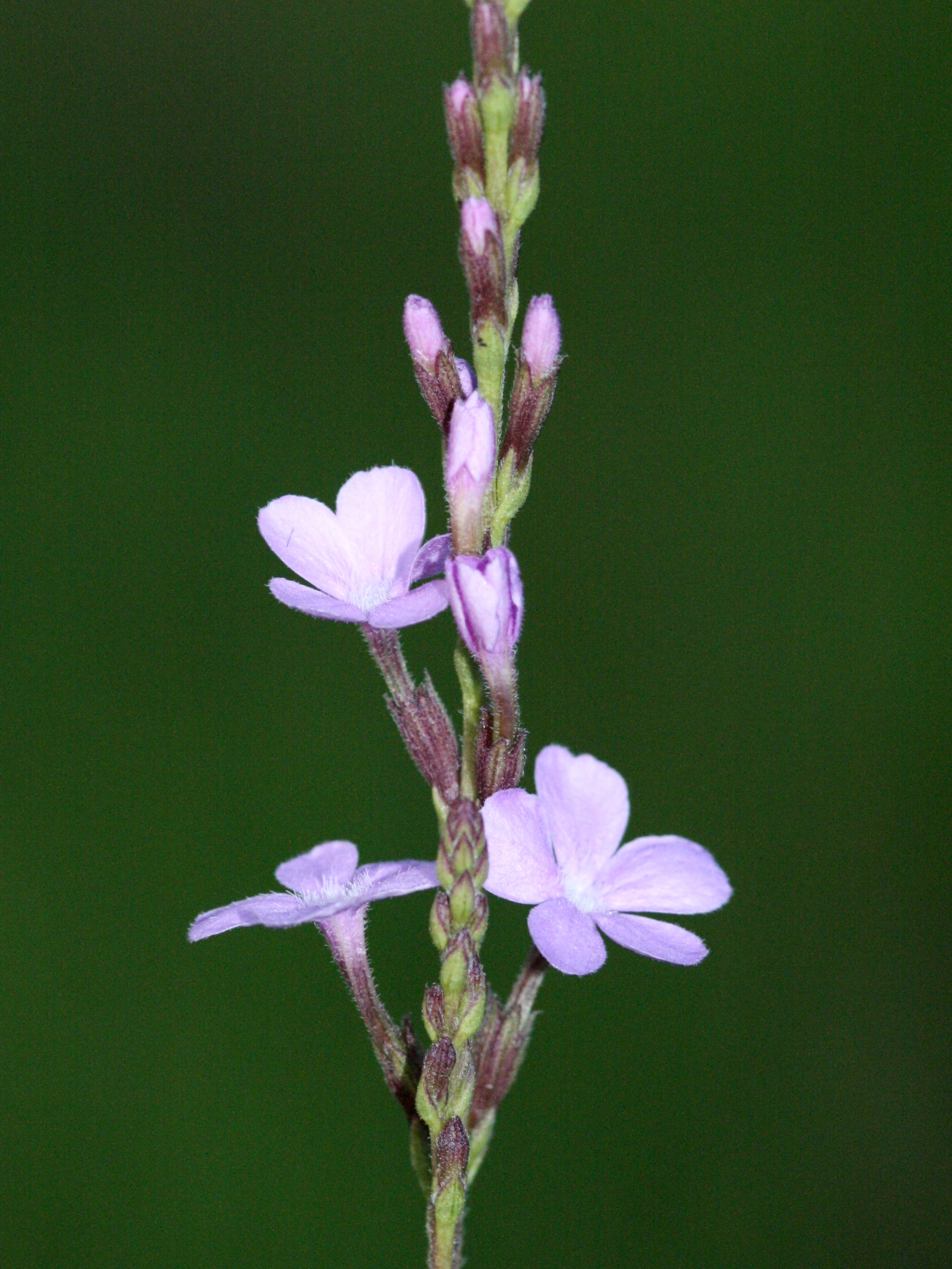

Tetrapollinia is a genus of flowering plants belonging to the family Gentianaceae.

Its native range is Southern Tropical America.

Species:

- Tetrapollinia caerulescens (Aubl.) Maguire & B.M.Boom
