= Valdesiana =

Scientific classification
- Kingdom: Plantae
- Clade: Tracheophytes
- Clade: Angiosperms
- Clade: Eudicots
- Clade: Asterids
- Order: Gentianales
- Family: Gentianaceae
- Genus: Valdesiana; Z.Díaz & M.Escudero (2023)
- Species: V. elegans

Binomial name
- Valdesiana elegans (Samp.) Z.Díaz & M.Escudero (2023)

Synonyms
- Centaurium spicatum proles elegans Samp. (1913); Centaurium spicatum f. elegans Samp. (1913); Schenkia elegans (Samp.) Z.Díaz (2012)

Genus of flowering plants

Valdesiana elegans is a species of flowering plant in the family Gentianaceae. It is the sole species in genus Valdesiana. It is an annual native to Portugal and western Spain.
