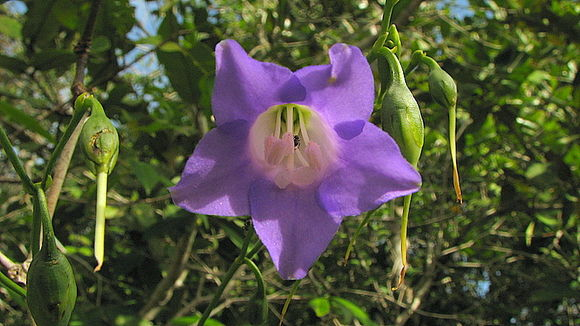
- Chelonanthus purpurascens in Brazil

Scientific classification
- Kingdom: Plantae
- Clade: Embryophytes
- Clade: Tracheophytes
- Clade: Spermatophytes
- Clade: Angiosperms
- Clade: Eudicots
- Clade: Asterids
- Order: Gentianales
- Family: Gentianaceae
- Genus: Chelonanthus (Griseb.) Gilg

= Chelonanthus =

Genus of flowering plants

Chelonanthus is a genus of flowering plants belonging to the family Gentianaceae. Its native range is Tropical America.

Species:

- Chelonanthus hamatus Lepis
- Chelonanthus longistylus (J.G.M.Pers. & Maas) Struwe & V.A.Albert
- Chelonanthus matogrossensis (J.G.M.Pers. & Maas) Struwe & V.A.Albert
- Chelonanthus pterocaulis Lepis
- Chelonanthus purpurascens (Aubl.) Struwe, S.Nilsson & V.A.Albert
