= Yanomamua =

Scientific classification
- Kingdom: Plantae
- Clade: Tracheophytes
- Clade: Angiosperms
- Clade: Eudicots
- Clade: Asterids
- Order: Gentianales
- Family: Gentianaceae
- Genus: Yanomamua; J.R.Grant, Maas & Struwe

Genus of flowering plants

Yanomamua is a genus of flowering plants belonging to the family Gentianaceae.

Its native range is Northern Brazil.

Species:

- Yanomamua araca J.R.Grant, Maas & Struwe
