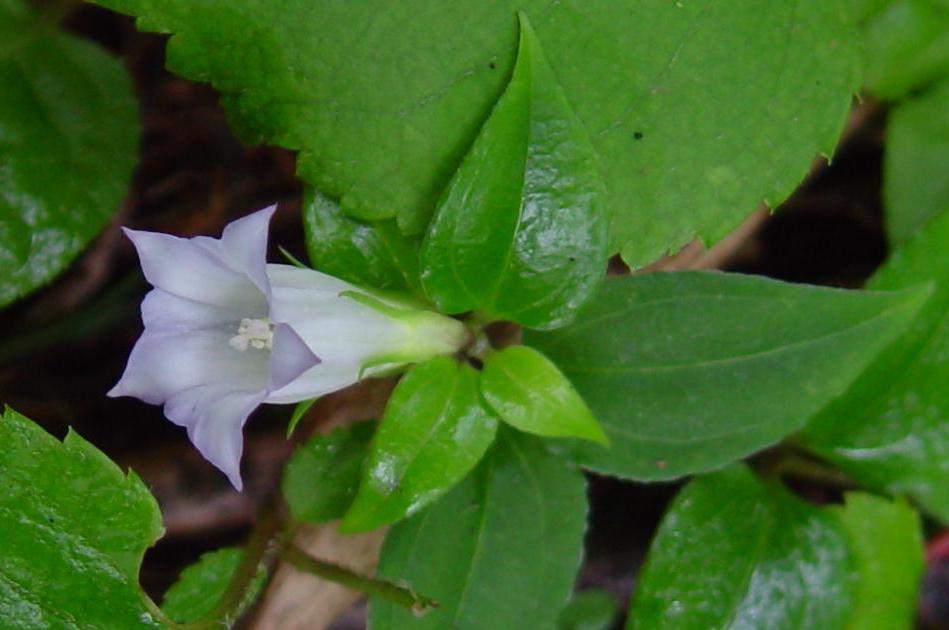
- Tripterospermum japonicum

Scientific classification
- Kingdom: Plantae
- Clade: Tracheophytes
- Clade: Angiosperms
- Clade: Eudicots
- Clade: Asterids
- Order: Gentianales
- Family: Gentianaceae
- Genus: Tripterospermum; Blume

= Tripterospermum =

Genus of flowering plants

Tripterospermum is a genus of flowering plants belonging to the family Gentianaceae.

Its native range is Sakhalin to Tropical Asia.

== Species ==
The following species are recognised in the genus Tripterospermum:

- Tripterospermum alutaceofolium (T.S.Liu & C.C.Kuo) J.Murata
- Tripterospermum australe J.Murata
- Tripterospermum brevidentatum Hul
- Tripterospermum brevilobum D.Fang
- Tripterospermum chevalieri Harry Sm. ex H.H.Pham
- Tripterospermum chinense (Migo) Harry Sm.
- Tripterospermum coeruleum (Hand.-Mazz.) Harry Sm.
- Tripterospermum cordatum (C.Marquand) Harry Sm.
- Tripterospermum cordifolioides J.Murata
- Tripterospermum cordifolium (Yamam.) Satake
- Tripterospermum discoideum (C.Marquand) Harry Sm.
- Tripterospermum distylum J.Murata & Yahara
- Tripterospermum fasciculatum (Wall.) Chater
- Tripterospermum filicaule (Hemsl.) Harry Sm.
- Tripterospermum hirticalyx C.Y.Wu ex C.J.Wu
- Tripterospermum hualienense T.C.Hsu & S.W.Chung
- Tripterospermum lanceolatum (Hayata) H.Hara ex Satake
- Tripterospermum lilungshanense Chih H.Chen & J.C.Wang
- Tripterospermum luzoniense (S.Vidal) J.Murata
- Tripterospermum maculatum Adr.Favre, Matuszak & Muellner
- Tripterospermum membranaceum (C.Marquand) Harry Sm.
- Tripterospermum microcarpum Hul
- Tripterospermum microphyllum Harry Sm.
- Tripterospermum nienkui (C.Marquand) C.J.Wu
- Tripterospermum nigrobaccatum H.Hara
- Tripterospermum pallidum Harry Sm.
- Tripterospermum pinbianense C.Y.Wu & C.J.Wu
- Tripterospermum robustum Harry Sm. ex Hul
- Tripterospermum sumatranum J.Murata
- Tripterospermum taiwanense (Masam.) Satake
- Tripterospermum tanatorajanense Adr.Favre, Matuszak & Muellner
- Tripterospermum trinerve Blume
- Tripterospermum trinervium (Thunb.) H.Ohashi & H.Nakai
- Tripterospermum volubile (D.Don) H.Hara
