= Microrphium =

Scientific classification
- Kingdom: Plantae
- Clade: Embryophytes
- Clade: Tracheophytes
- Clade: Angiosperms
- Clade: Eudicots
- Clade: Asterids
- Order: Gentianales
- Family: Gentianaceae
- Genus: Microrphium; C.B.Clarke
- Species: M. pubescens

Binomial name
- Microrphium pubescens C.B.Clarke

Genus of plants

Microrphium is a monotypic genus of flowering plants belonging to the family Gentianaceae. The only species is Microrphium pubescens.

Its native range is Thailand, Peninsular Malaysia, and the Philippines.
