= Cracosna =

Scientific classification
- Kingdom: Plantae
- Clade: Tracheophytes
- Clade: Angiosperms
- Clade: Eudicots
- Clade: Asterids
- Order: Gentianales
- Family: Gentianaceae
- Genus: Cracosna; Gagnep.

Genus of flowering plants

Cracosna is a genus of flowering plants belonging to the family Gentianaceae.

Its native range is Indo-China.

Species:

- Cracosna carinata (Dop) Thiv
- Cracosna gracilis (Dop) Thiv
- Cracosna xyridiformis Gagnep.
