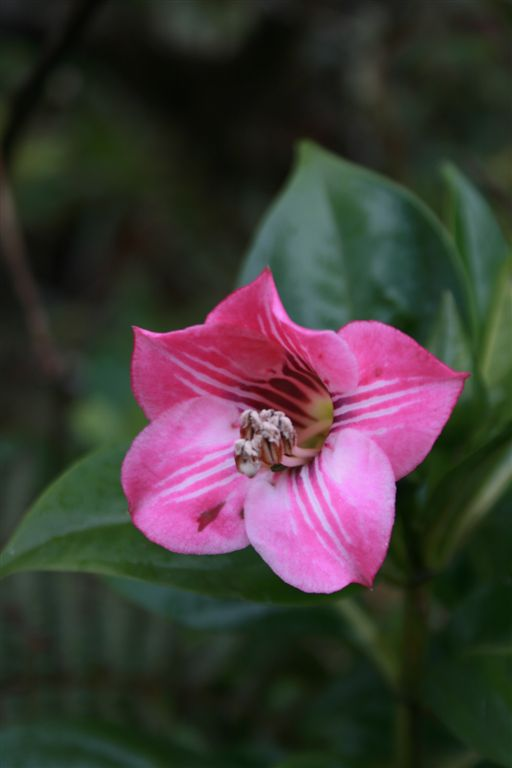
- Symbolanthus elisabethae

Scientific classification
- Kingdom: Plantae
- Clade: Embryophytes
- Clade: Tracheophytes
- Clade: Angiosperms
- Clade: Eudicots
- Clade: Asterids
- Order: Gentianales
- Family: Gentianaceae
- Tribe: Helieae
- Genus: Symbolanthus; G.Don

Species
- See text

Synonyms
- Leiothamnus Griseb.; Wurdackanthus Maguire

= Symbolanthus =

Genus of flowering plants

Symbolanthus, the ring‐gentians, are a genus of flowering plants in the family Gentianaceae, native to the montane tropics of southern Central America and northern and eastern South America.

== Species ==
Species currently accepted by The Plant List are as follows:

- Symbolanthus anomalus (Kunth) Gilg
- Symbolanthus aureus Struwe & V.A.Albert
- Symbolanthus australis Struwe
- Symbolanthus brittonianus Gilg
- Symbolanthus camanensis Maguire & B.M.Boom
- Symbolanthus elisabethae (M.R.Schomb.) Gilg
- Symbolanthus frigidus (Sw.) Struwe & K.R. Gould
- Symbolanthus huachamacariensis Steyerm.
- Symbolanthus latifolius Gilg
- Symbolanthus macranthus (Benth.) Moldenke
- Symbolanthus magnificus Gilg
- Symbolanthus mathewsii (Griseb.) Ewan
- Symbolanthus nerioides (Griseb.) Ewan
- Symbolanthus pauciflorus Spruce ex Gilg
- Symbolanthus pterocalyx Struwe
- Symbolanthus pulcherrimus Gilg
- Symbolanthus rosmarinifolius Struwe & V.A.Albert
- Symbolanthus sessilis Steyerm. & Maguire
- Symbolanthus tetrapterus Struwe
- Symbolanthus tricolor Gilg
- Symbolanthus vasculosus (Griseb.) Gilg
- Symbolanthus yaviensis Steyerm.
