= Sipapoantha =

Scientific classification
- Kingdom: Plantae
- Clade: Tracheophytes
- Clade: Angiosperms
- Clade: Eudicots
- Clade: Asterids
- Order: Gentianales
- Family: Gentianaceae
- Genus: Sipapoantha; Maguire & B.M.Boom

Genus of plants

Sipapoantha is a genus of flowering plants belonging to the family Gentianaceae. It includes two species of shrubs native to the tepuis, flat-topped mountains in the border region of southern Vezuela, northern Brazil, and Guyana.

Species:

- Sipapoantha obtusisepala Lepis, Maas & Struwe – Serra Baeta of Roraima, Brazil
- Sipapoantha ostrina Maguire & B.M.Boom – Cerro Sipapo, Cerro Cuao, and Cerro Autana of Amazonas state, Venezuela
