= Geniostemon =

Scientific classification
- Kingdom: Plantae
- Clade: Tracheophytes
- Clade: Angiosperms
- Clade: Eudicots
- Clade: Asterids
- Order: Gentianales
- Family: Gentianaceae
- Genus: Geniostemon; Engelm. & A.Gray

Genus of plants

Geniostemon is a genus of flowering plants belonging to the family Gentianaceae.

Its native range is Northeastern Mexico.

Species:

- Geniostemon atarjanus B.L.Turner
- Geniostemon coulteri Engelm. & A.Gray
- Geniostemon gypsophilus B.L.Turner
- Geniostemon rotundifolius Rzed. & Calderón
- Geniostemon schaffneri Engelm. & A.Gray
