= Bisgoeppertia =

Scientific classification
- Kingdom: Plantae
- Clade: Tracheophytes
- Clade: Angiosperms
- Clade: Eudicots
- Clade: Asterids
- Order: Gentianales
- Family: Gentianaceae
- Genus: Bisgoeppertia; Kuntze

Genus of flowering plants

Bisgoeppertia is a genus of flowering plants belonging to the family of Gentianaceae.

Its native range is Cuba, Hispaniola.

Species:

- Bisgoeppertia gracilis (C.Wright ex Griseb.) Kuntze
- Bisgoeppertia robustior Greuter & R.Rankin
- Bisgoeppertia scandens (Spreng.) Urb.
