= Duplipetala =

Scientific classification
- Kingdom: Plantae
- Clade: Embryophytes
- Clade: Tracheophytes
- Clade: Angiosperms
- Clade: Eudicots
- Clade: Asterids
- Order: Gentianales
- Family: Gentianaceae
- Genus: Duplipetala; Thiv

Genus of plants

Duplipetala is a genus of flowering plants belonging to the family Gentianaceae.

Its native range is Thailand to Peninsular Malaysia.

Species:

- Duplipetala hexagona (Kerr) Thiv
- Duplipetala pentanthera (C.B.Clarke) Thiv
