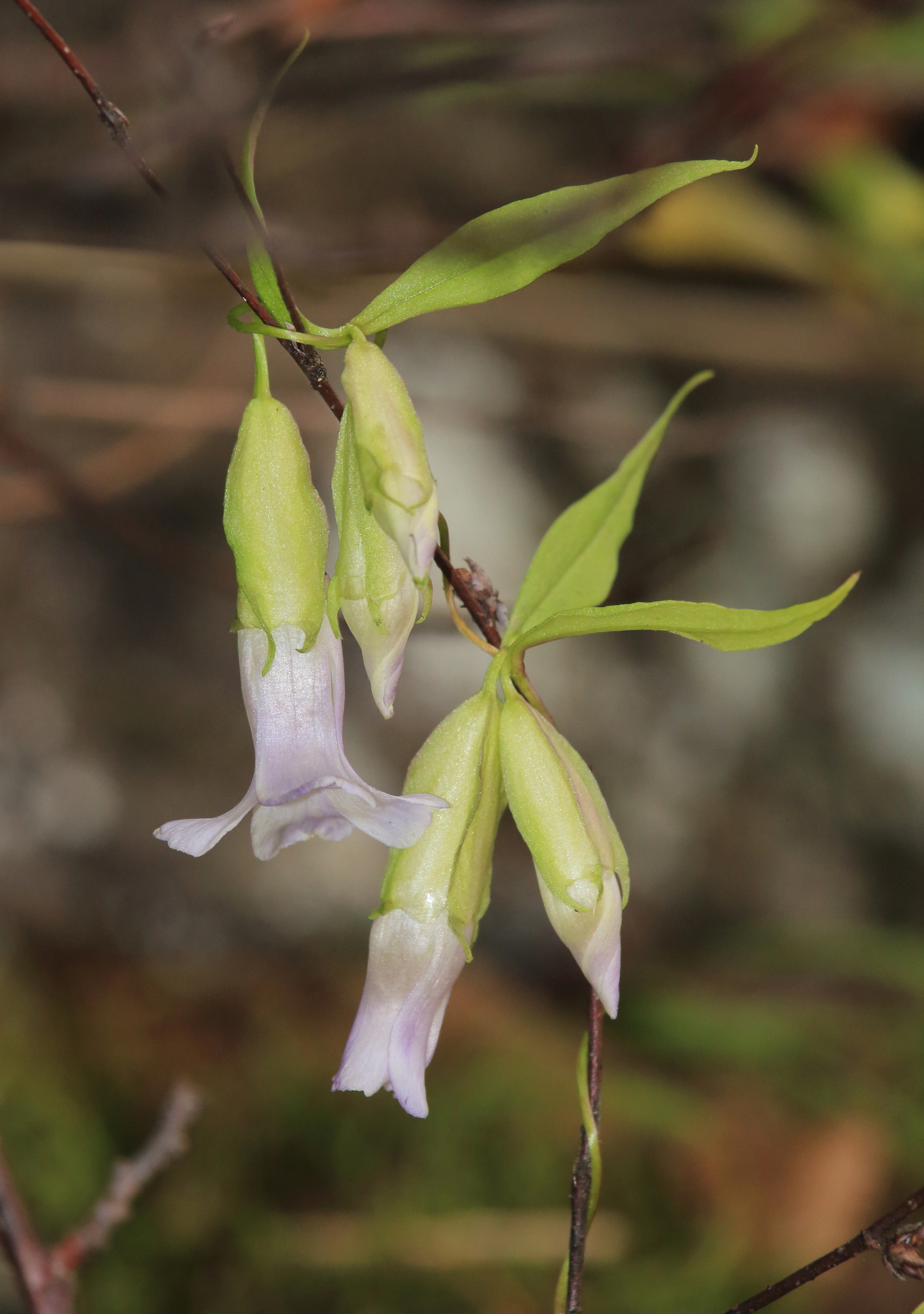
- Pterygocalyx volubilis

Scientific classification
- Kingdom: Plantae
- Clade: Tracheophytes
- Clade: Angiosperms
- Clade: Eudicots
- Clade: Asterids
- Order: Gentianales
- Family: Gentianaceae
- Genus: Pterygocalyx; Maxim.
- Species: P. volubilis

Binomial name
- Pterygocalyx volubilis Maxim.

= Pterygocalyx =

Genus of plants

Pterygocalyx is a monotypic genus of flowering plants belonging to the family Gentianaceae. The only species is Pterygocalyx volubilis.

Its native range is Russian Far East to North Vietnam and Korea.
