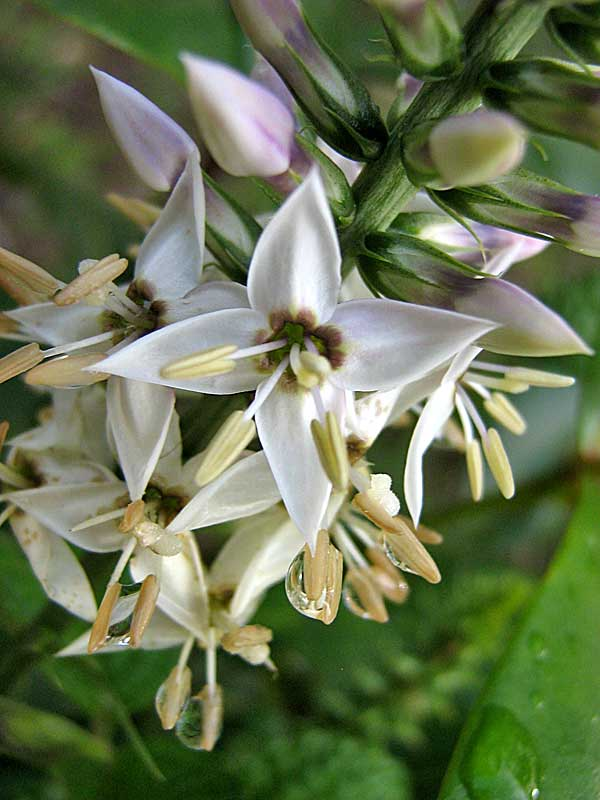
- Coutoubea spicata near Entre Rios, Bahia, Brazil

Scientific classification
- Kingdom: Plantae
- Clade: Tracheophytes
- Clade: Angiosperms
- Clade: Eudicots
- Clade: Asterids
- Order: Gentianales
- Family: Gentianaceae
- Tribe: Chironieae
- Genus: Coutoubea; Aubl.

= Coutoubea =

Genus of flowering plants

Coutoubea is a genus of flowering plants belonging to the family Gentianaceae.

Its native range is Mexico, Central and Southern Tropical America.

Species:

- Coutoubea humilis Sandwith
- Coutoubea minor Kunth
- Coutoubea ramosa Aubl.
- Coutoubea reflexa Benth.
- Coutoubea spicata Aubl.
