= Neblinantha =

Scientific classification
- Kingdom: Plantae
- Clade: Tracheophytes
- Clade: Angiosperms
- Clade: Eudicots
- Clade: Asterids
- Order: Gentianales
- Family: Gentianaceae
- Genus: Neblinantha; Maguire

Genus of plants

Neblinantha is a genus of flowering plants belonging to the family Gentianaceae.

Its native range is Venezuela to Northern Brazil.

Species:

- Neblinantha neblinae Maguire
- Neblinantha parvifolia Maguire
