= Zonanthus =

Scientific classification
- Kingdom: Plantae
- Clade: Tracheophytes
- Clade: Angiosperms
- Clade: Eudicots
- Clade: Asterids
- Order: Gentianales
- Family: Gentianaceae
- Genus: Zonanthus; Griseb.
- Species: Z. cubensis

Binomial name
- Zonanthus cubensis Griseb.

Genus of flowering plants

Zonanthus is a genus of flowering plants belonging to the family Gentianaceae. It includes a single species, Zonanthus cubensis, a shrub or small tree endemic to Cuba.
