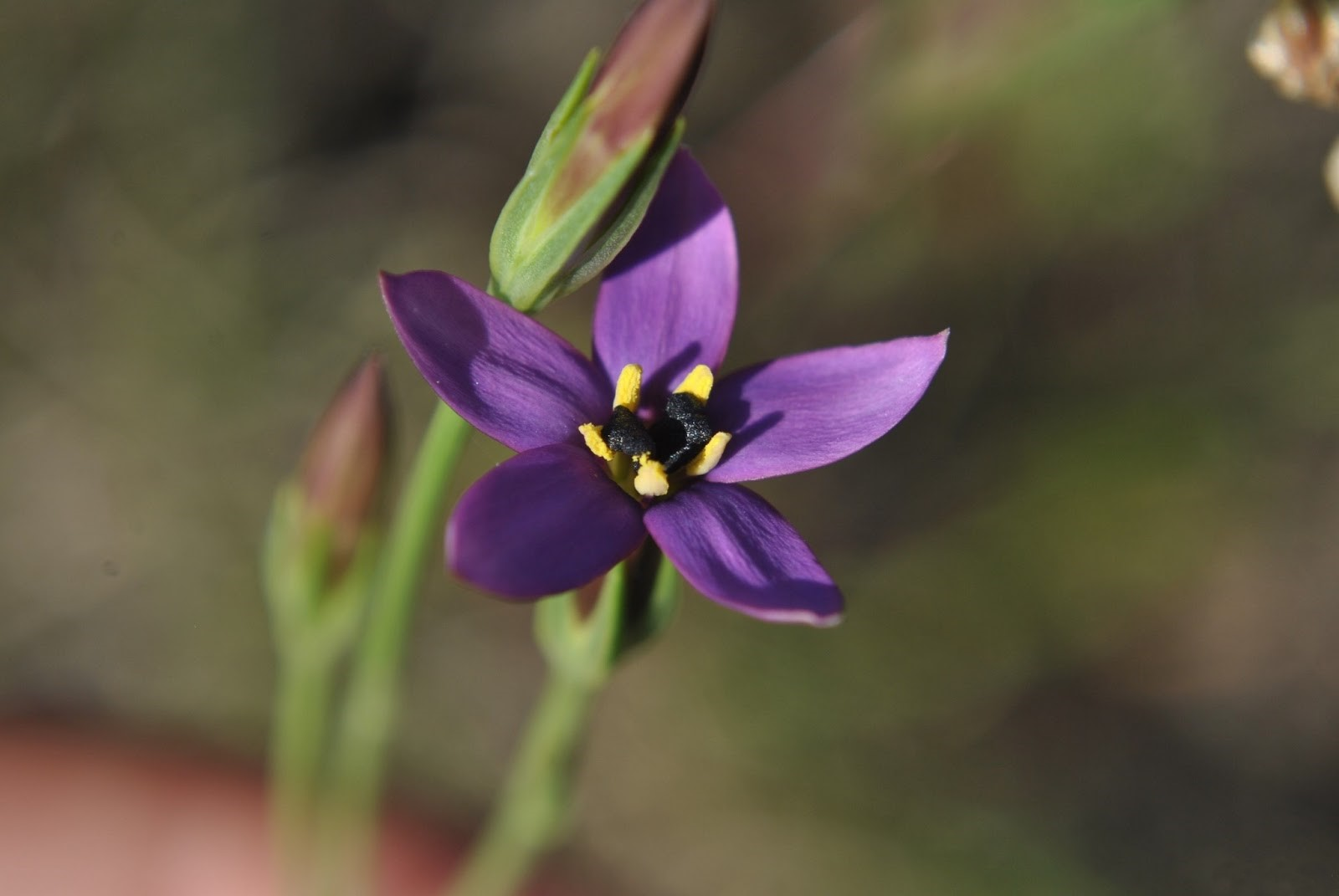

Scientific classification
- Kingdom: Plantae
- Clade: Tracheophytes
- Clade: Angiosperms
- Clade: Eudicots
- Clade: Asterids
- Order: Gentianales
- Family: Gentianaceae
- Genus: Zygostigma; Griseb.
- Species: Z. australe

Binomial name
- Zygostigma australe (Cham. & Schltdl.) Griseb.

= Zygostigma =

Genus of plants

Zygostigma australe is a species of flowering plant in the family Gentianaceae native to South America. It was originally described as Sabattia australis in 1826 and transferred to the genus Zygostigma, of which it is the only member, in 1908.
