= Limahlania =

Scientific classification
- Kingdom: Plantae
- Clade: Tracheophytes
- Clade: Angiosperms
- Clade: Eudicots
- Clade: Asterids
- Order: Gentianales
- Family: Gentianaceae
- Genus: Limahlania; K.M.Wong & Sugumaran
- Species: L. crenulata

Binomial name
- Limahlania crenulata (Maingay ex C.B.Clarke) K.M.Wong & Sugumaran

Genus of plants

Limahlania is a monotypic genus of flowering plants belonging to the family Gentianaceae. The only species is Limahlania crenulata.

Its native range is Southern Indo-China to Western Malesia.
