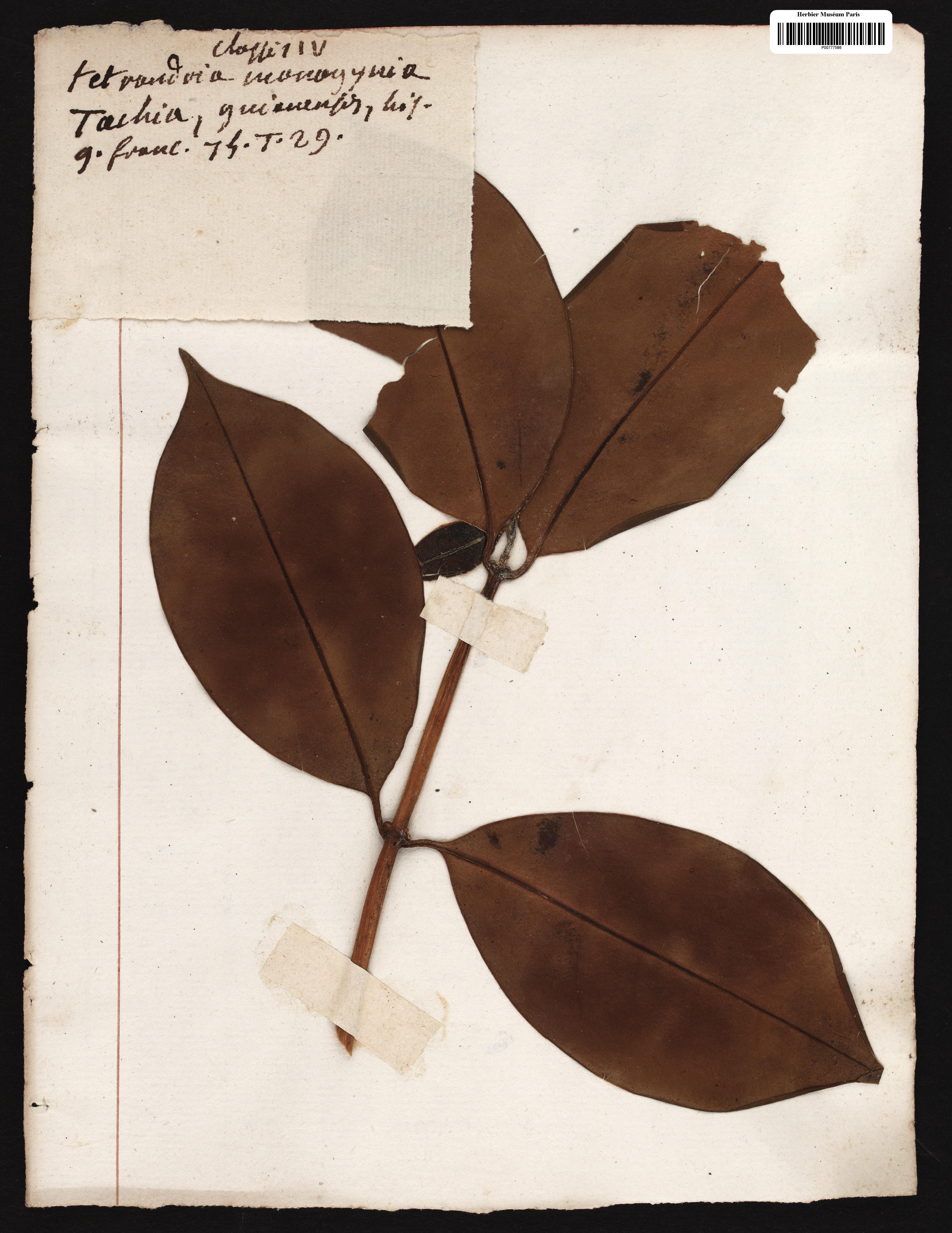
- Tachia guianensis

Scientific classification
- Kingdom: Plantae
- Clade: Tracheophytes
- Clade: Angiosperms
- Clade: Eudicots
- Clade: Asterids
- Order: Gentianales
- Family: Gentianaceae
- Genus: Tachia; Aubl. (1775)

Species
- 13, see text

Synonyms
- Myrmecia Schreb. (1789)

= Tachia =

Genus of flowering plants

Tachia is a genus of flowering plants in the family Gentianaceae. It includes 13 species native to the tropical Americas, ranging from Costa Rica through Colombia, Venezuela, the Guianas, and Peru to northern Brazil and Bolivia.

== Species ==
13 species are accepted.

- Tachia blancoi Al.Rodr. & J.Sánchez-Gonz.
- Tachia gracilis Benth.
- Tachia grandiflora Maguire & Weaver
- Tachia grandifolia Maguire & Weaver
- Tachia guianensis Aubl.
- Tachia lancisepala Struwe, Kinkade & Maas
- Tachia loretensis Maguire & Weaver
- Tachia occidentalis Maguire & Weaver
- Tachia orientalis Struwe & Kinkade
- Tachia parviflora Maguire & Weaver
- Tachia schomburgkiana Benth.
- Tachia siwertii Struwe, Kinkade & Maas
- Tachia smithii Maguire & Weaver
