= Urogentias =

Scientific classification
- Kingdom: Plantae
- Clade: Tracheophytes
- Clade: Angiosperms
- Clade: Eudicots
- Clade: Asterids
- Order: Gentianales
- Family: Gentianaceae
- Genus: Urogentias; Gilg & Gilg-Ben.

Genus of flowering plants

Urogentias is a genus of flowering plants belonging to the family Gentianaceae.

Its native range is Tanzania.

Species:

- Urogentias ulugurensis Gilg & Gilg-Ben.
