= Phyllocyclus =

Scientific classification
- Kingdom: Plantae
- Clade: Tracheophytes
- Clade: Angiosperms
- Clade: Eudicots
- Clade: Asterids
- Order: Gentianales
- Family: Gentianaceae
- Genus: Phyllocyclus; Kurz

Genus of plants

Phyllocyclus is a genus of flowering plants belonging to the family Gentianaceae.

Its native range is Southern China to Indo-China.

Species:

- Phyllocyclus helferianus Kurz
- Phyllocyclus lucidissimus (H.Lév. & Vaniot) Thiv
- Phyllocyclus minutiflorus Thiv
- Phyllocyclus parishii (Hook.f.) Kurz
- Phyllocyclus petelotii (Merr.) Thiv
