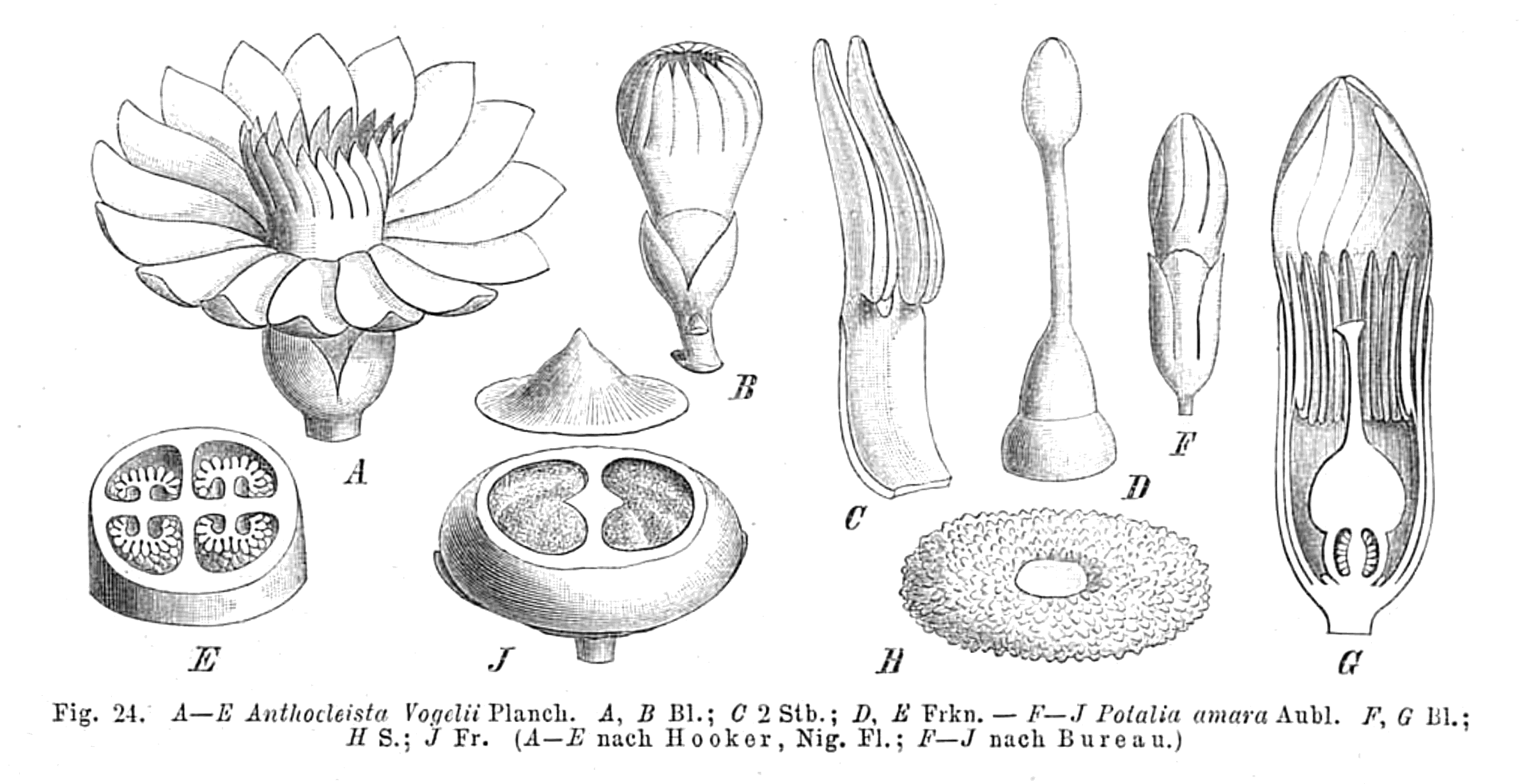
- Loganiaceae spp EP-IV2-024

Scientific classification
- Kingdom: Plantae
- Clade: Tracheophytes
- Clade: Angiosperms
- Clade: Eudicots
- Clade: Asterids
- Order: Gentianales
- Family: Gentianaceae
- Genus: Potalia; Aubl.

= Potalia =

Genus of plants

Potalia is a genus of flowering plants belonging to the family Gentianaceae.

Its native range is Southern Tropical America.

Species:

- Potalia amara Aubl.
- Potalia chocoensis Struwe & V.A.Albert
- Potalia coronata Struwe & V.A.Albert
- Potalia crassa Struwe & V.A.Albert
- Potalia elegans Struwe & V.A.Albert
- Potalia maguireorum Struwe & V.A.Albert
- Potalia resinifera Mart.
- Potalia turbinata Struwe & V.A.Albert
- Potalia yanamonoensis Struwe & V.A.Albert
