= Irlbachia =

Scientific classification
- Kingdom: Plantae
- Clade: Tracheophytes
- Clade: Angiosperms
- Clade: Eudicots
- Clade: Asterids
- Order: Gentianales
- Family: Gentianaceae
- Genus: Irlbachia; Mart.

Synonyms
- Brachycodon Progel; Pagaea Griseb.

Genus of plants

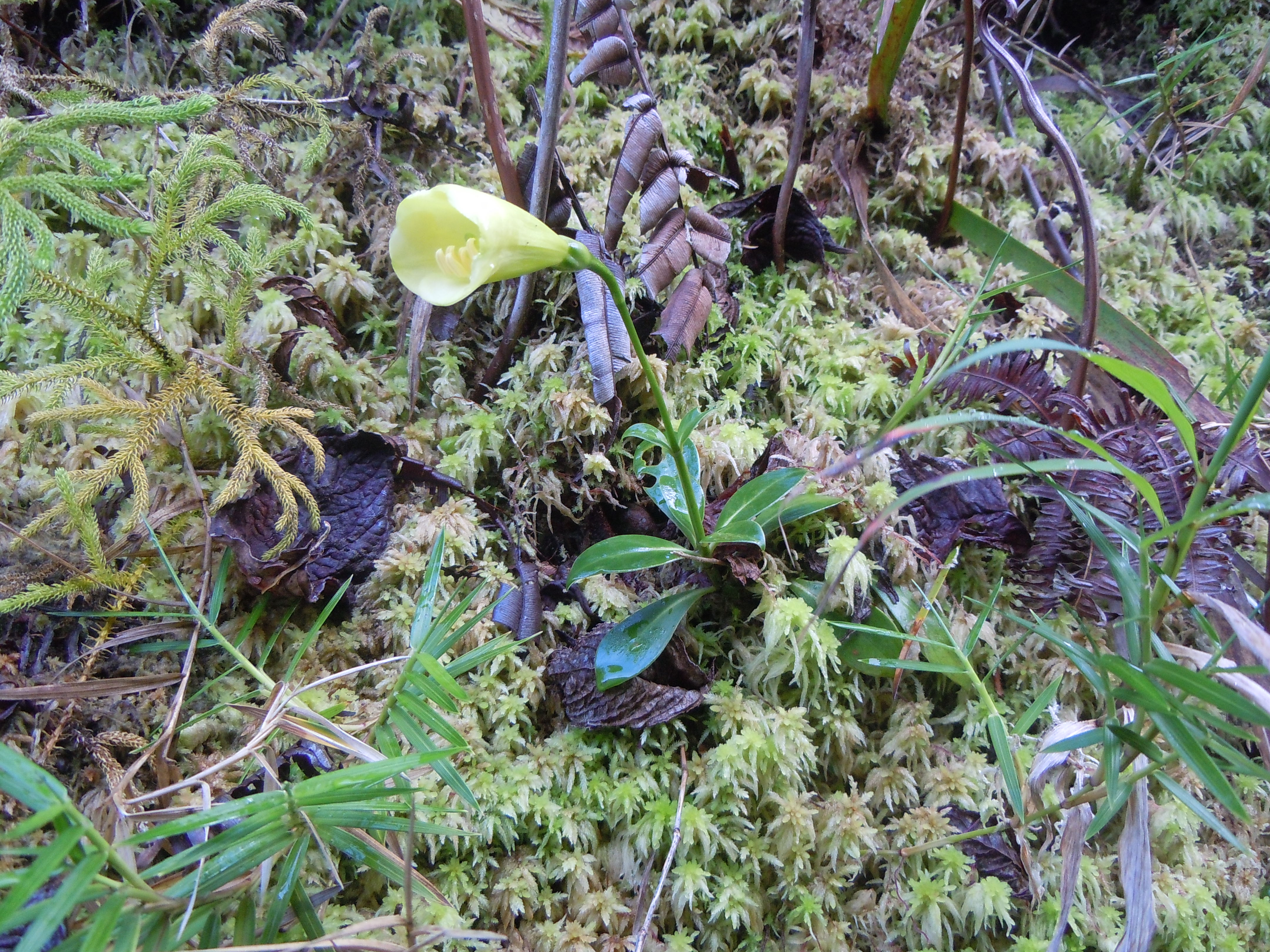
Irlbachia frigida

Irlbachia is a genus of flowering plants belonging to the family Gentianaceae.

It is native to Colombia, Venezuela, Guyana and Brazil.

The genus name of Irlbachia is in honour of Franz Gabriel von Bray (1765–1832), a Bavarian diplomat and naturalist. He was president of the botanical society in Regensburg. It was first described and published in Nov. Gen. Sp. Pl. Vol.2 on page 101 in 1827.

== Species ==
According to Kew:

- Irlbachia nemorosa (Willd. ex Schult.) Merr.
- Irlbachia phelpsiana Maguire
- Irlbachia plantaginifolia Maguire
- Irlbachia poeppigii (Griseb.) L.Cobb & Maas
- Irlbachia tatei (Gleason) Maguire
