= Voyriella =

Scientific classification
- Kingdom: Plantae
- Clade: Tracheophytes
- Clade: Angiosperms
- Clade: Eudicots
- Clade: Asterids
- Order: Gentianales
- Family: Gentianaceae
- Genus: Voyriella (Miq.) Miq.

Genus of flowering plants

Voyriella is a genus of flowering plants belonging to the family Gentianaceae.

Its native range is Panama to Southern Tropical America.

Species:

- Voyriella parviflora (Miq.) Miq.
