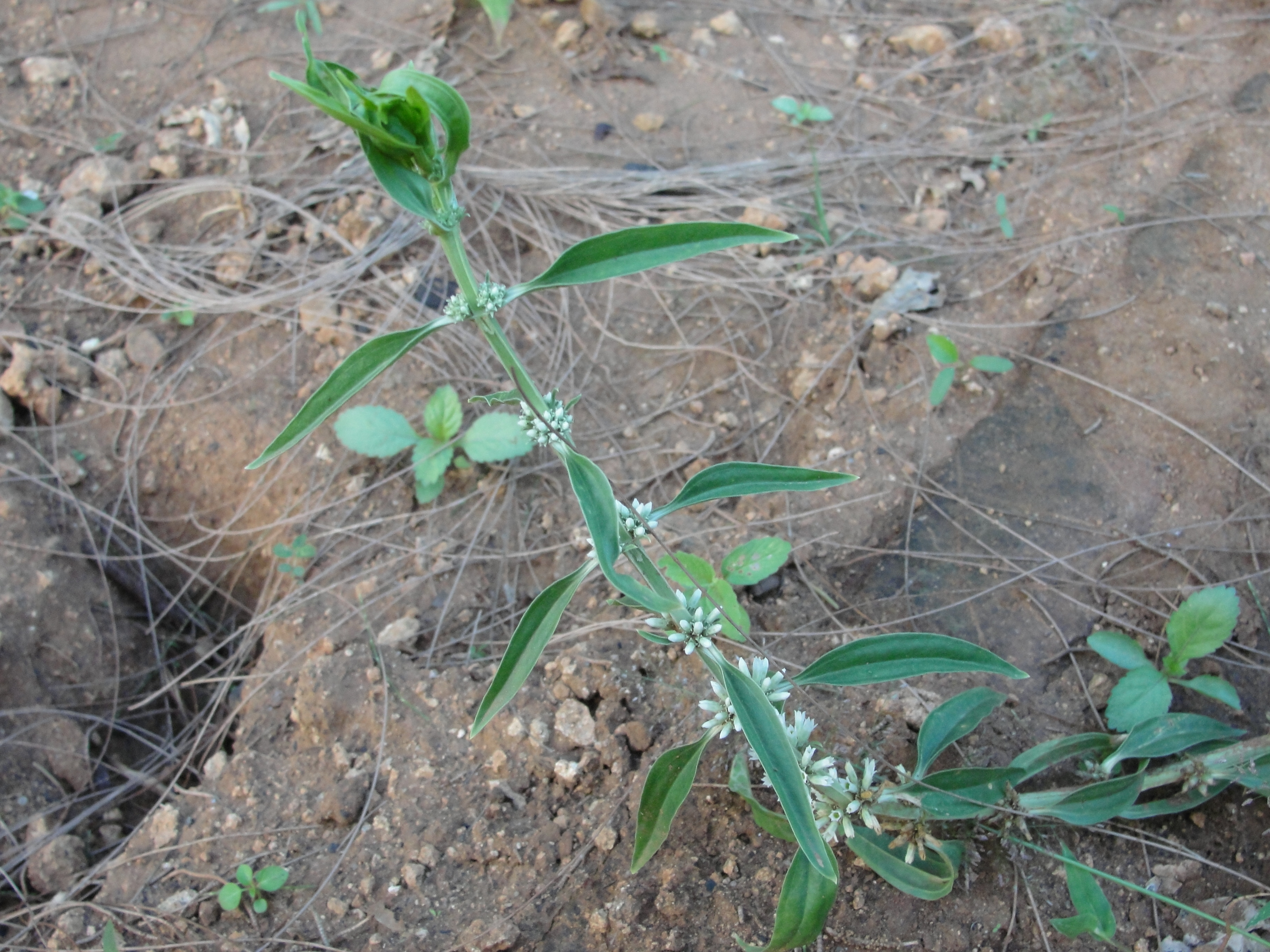
- Enicostemma axillare in Forest Extension Center, Sithar Koyil, Salem, Tamil Nadu, India.

Scientific classification
- Kingdom: Plantae
- Clade: Tracheophytes
- Clade: Angiosperms
- Clade: Eudicots
- Clade: Asterids
- Order: Gentianales
- Family: Gentianaceae
- Genus: Enicostema; Blume

= Enicostema =

Genus of plants

Enicostema is a genus of flowering plants belonging to the family Gentianaceae.

Its native range is Ethiopia to Southern Africa and Southern Malesia, Central America, Caribbean to Venezuela.

Species:

- Enicostema axillare (Poir. ex Lam.) A.Raynal
- Enicostema elizabethiae Veldkamp
- Enicostema verticillatum (L.) Engl.
