= Tapeinostemon =

Scientific classification
- Kingdom: Plantae
- Clade: Embryophytes
- Clade: Tracheophytes
- Clade: Angiosperms
- Clade: Eudicots
- Clade: Asterids
- Order: Gentianales
- Family: Gentianaceae
- Tribe: Saccifolieae
- Genus: Tapeinostemon; Benth.

Species
- See text

Synonyms
- Stahelia Jonker

Genus of flowering plants

Tapeinostemon is a genus of flowering plants in the family Gentianaceae, native to northern South America. It has microreticulate pollen grains, supporting its placement in the tribe Saccifolieae.

== Species ==
Currently accepted species include:

- Tapeinostemon adulans J.R.Grant
- Tapeinostemon breweri Steyerm. & Maguire
- Tapeinostemon jauaensis Steyerm. & Maguire
- Tapeinostemon longiflorus Maguire & Steyerm.
- Tapeinostemon rugosus Maguire & Steyerm.
- Tapeinostemon sessiliflorus (Humb. & Bonpl. ex Schult.) Pruski & S.F.Sm.
- Tapeinostemon spenneroides Benth.
- Tapeinostemon zamoranus Steyerm.
