= Faroa =

Scientific classification
- Kingdom: Plantae
- Clade: Embryophytes
- Clade: Tracheophytes
- Clade: Angiosperms
- Clade: Eudicots
- Clade: Asterids
- Order: Gentianales
- Family: Gentianaceae
- Tribe: Potalieae
- Subtribe: Faroinae
- Genus: Faroa; Welw.

Species
- See text

Genus of flowering plants

Faroa is a genus of flowering plants in the gentian family (Gentianaceae), native to tropical Africa. Faroa species are noted for their ability to grow in harsh conditions such as on bare rock, sand, mineralized soils, and mine tailings with high concentrations of copper.

== Species ==
Species currently accepted by The Plant List are as follows:

- Faroa acaulis R.E.Fr.
- Faroa acuminata P.Taylor
- Faroa affinis De Wild.
- Faroa alata P.Taylor
- Faroa amara Gilg ex Baker
- Faroa axillaris Baker
- Faroa chalcophila P.Taylor
- Faroa corniculata P.Taylor
- Faroa duvigneaudii Lambinon
- Faroa fanshawei P.Taylor
- Faroa graveolens Baker
- Faroa hutchinsonii P.Taylor
- Faroa involucrata (Klotzsch) Knobl.
- Faroa malaissei Bamps
- Faroa minutiflora P.Taylor
- Faroa pusilla Baker
- Faroa richardsiae P.Taylor
- Faroa salutaris Welw.
- Faroa schaijesiorum Bamps
