= Elachista helia =

Scientific classification
- Kingdom: Animalia
- Phylum: Arthropoda
- Clade: Pancrustacea
- Class: Insecta
- Order: Lepidoptera
- Family: Elachistidae
- Genus: Elachista
- Species: E. helia

Binomial name
- Elachista helia Kaila & Sruoga, 2014

Species of moth

Elachista helia is a moth in the family Elachistidae. It was described by Lauri Kaila and Sruoga in 2014. It is found only on Rhodes in Greece.

The length of the forewings is 3–3.5 mm.
