= Helias (disambiguation) =

Helias is a butterfly genus.

Helias may also refer to:

== People ==
=== Given name ===
- Helias (died 326), Christian martyr and companion of Zanitas and Lazarus of Persia
- Helias of Cologne (died 1040), Irish abbot and musician
- Helias (Archdeacon of Meath), 12th-century Irish cleric
- Helias of Saint-Saens (died 1128), Norman nobleman
- Helias de Say (died 1165), Norman nobleman
- Helias Doundoulakis (1923–2016), Greek American civil engineer

=== Surname ===
- Ferdinand Helias (1796–1874), Roman Catholic clergyman in Missouri, US
- Mark Helias (born 1950), American jazz musician
- Pêr-Jakez Helias (1914–1995), Breton stage actor and writer
- Peter Helias (c. 1100–after 1166), French priest and philosopher

=== Physics ===
- Helias (stellarator)

== See also ==
- Helios (disambiguation)
- Ilias (disambiguation)
