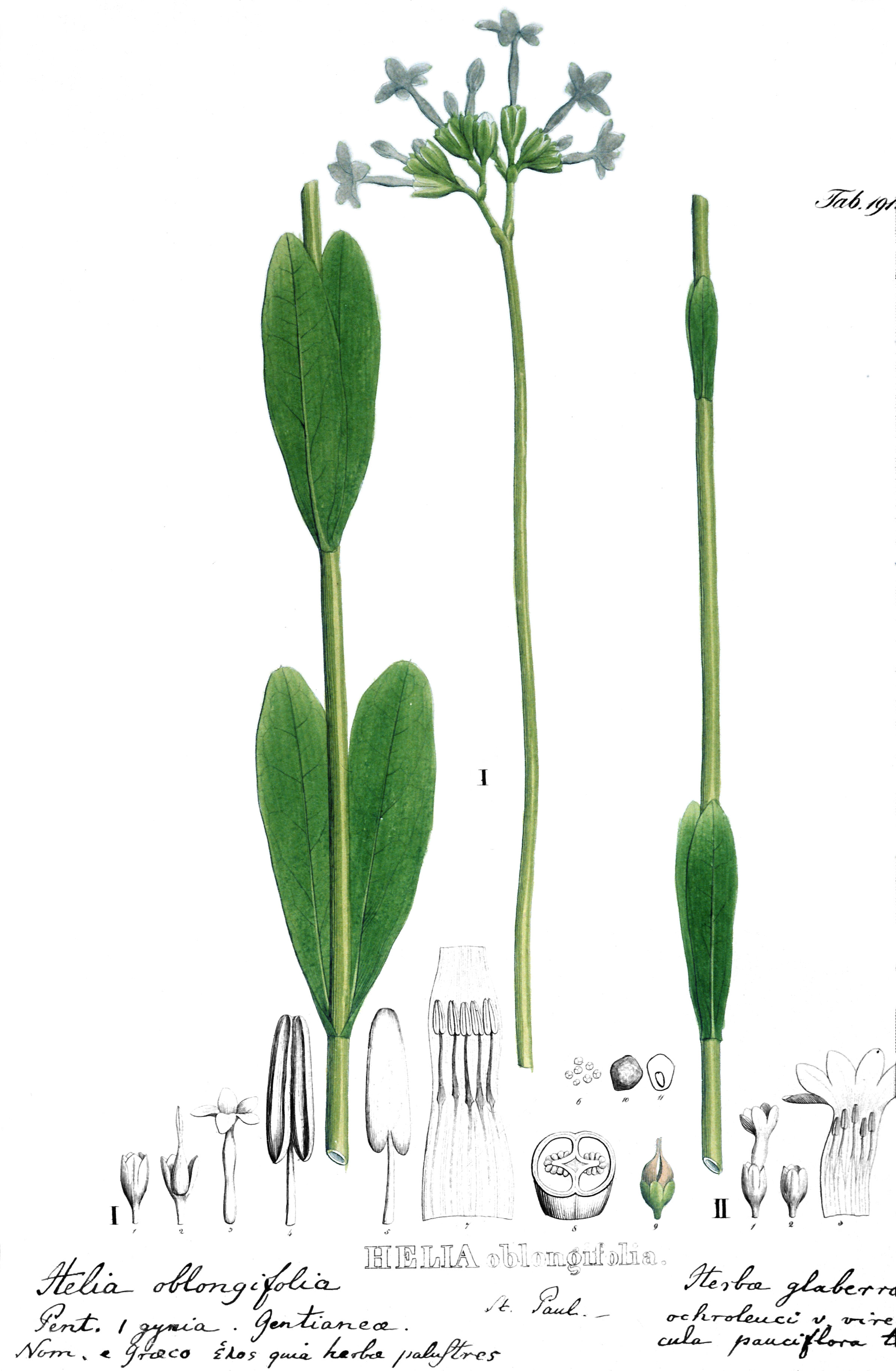
- Helia oblongifolia

Scientific classification
- Kingdom: Plantae
- Clade: Tracheophytes
- Clade: Angiosperms
- Clade: Eudicots
- Clade: Asterids
- Order: Gentianales
- Family: Gentianaceae
- Genus: Helia; Mart. (1827)

Species
- 8; see text

= Helia (plant) =

Genus of flowering plants

Helia is a genus of flowering plants in the family Gentianaceae. It includes eight species native to the tropical Americas, ranging from southern Mexico to northeastern Argentina.

== Species ==
Eight species are accepted.

- Helia acutangula (Ruiz & Pav.) Kuntze
- Helia alata (Aubl.) Kuntze
- Helia alba (Spruce ex Progel) Kuntze
- Helia angustifolia (Kunth) Kuntze
- Helia brevifolia Cham.
- Helia grandiflora (Aubl.) Kuntze
- Helia oblongifolia Mart.
- Helia viridiflora (Mart.) Kuntze
