= Prepusa (plant) =

Scientific classification
- Kingdom: Plantae
- Clade: Tracheophytes
- Clade: Angiosperms
- Clade: Eudicots
- Clade: Asterids
- Order: Gentianales
- Family: Gentianaceae
- Tribe: Helieae
- Genus: Prepusa; Mart.

Genus of plants

Prepusa is a genus of plants in the family Gentianaceae. There are five known species, all endemic to mountains in Brazil.

It has been suggested that the name "prepusa" was derived from the Greek "πρεπουσα", which means "conspicuous", a references to the genus's unique flowers; another suggestion for its origin has been the Latin word "praeputium".

Species

- Prepusa montana
- Prepusa connata
- Prepusa hookeriana
- Prepusa alata
- Prepusa viridiflora
