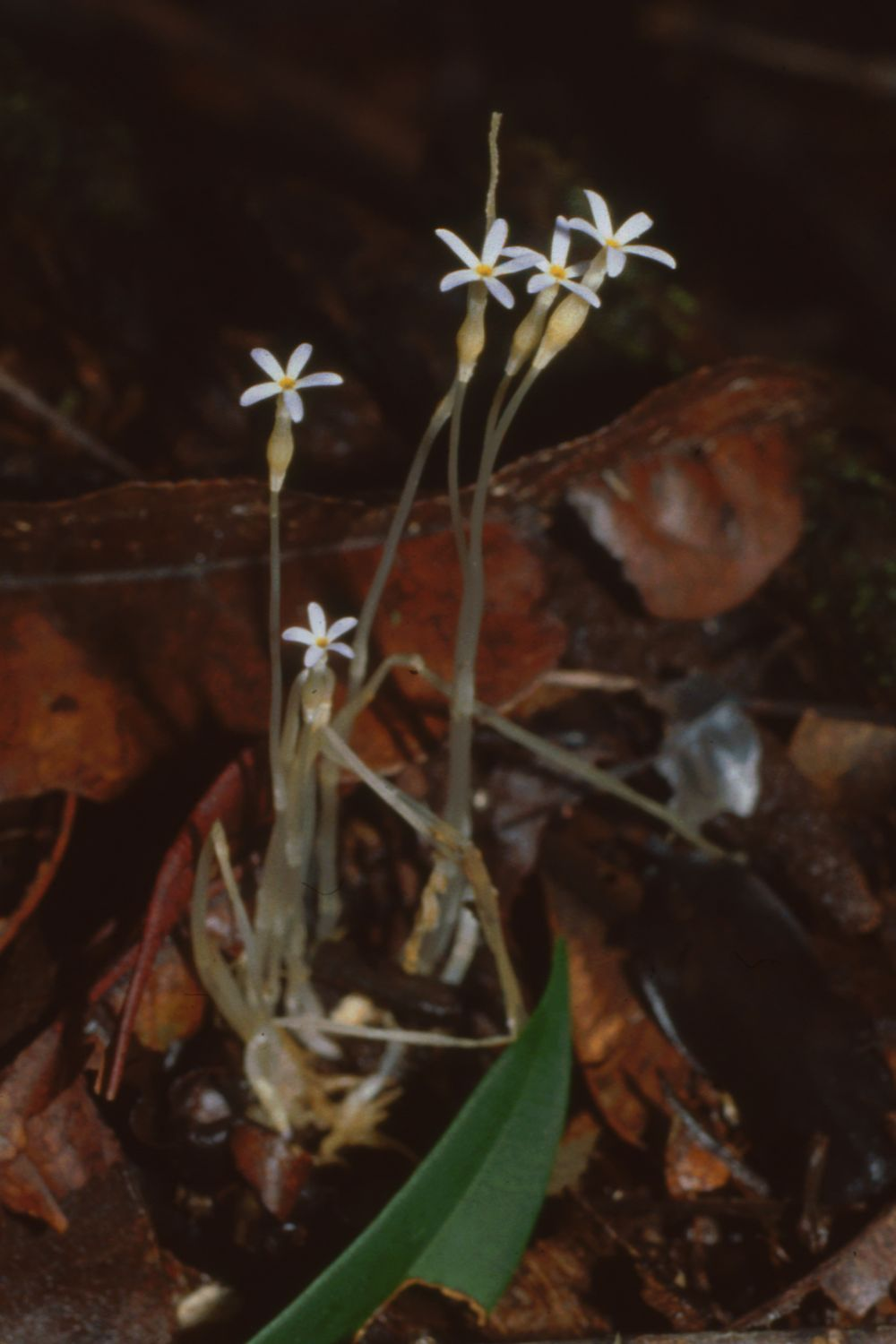
- Voyria tenella

Scientific classification
- Kingdom: Plantae
- Clade: Tracheophytes
- Clade: Angiosperms
- Clade: Eudicots
- Clade: Asterids
- Order: Gentianales
- Family: Gentianaceae
- Tribe: Voyrieae; Gilg
- Genus: Voyria; Aubl.

Species
- See text

Synonyms
- Leiphaimos Schltdl. & Cham.

= Voyria =

Genus of flowering plants

Voyria, commonly known as ghostplants, is a genus of 20 species of herbaceous perennial plants, belonging to the family Gentianaceae. They are mostly native to warm temperate and tropical regions of the Caribbean, Central America and South America, except for V. primuloides, which is found in West and Central Africa. V. parasitica reaches as far north as the Everglades in Florida.

Unlike most plants, they do not contain chlorophyll; they are myco-heterotrophs, getting their food through parasitism upon fungi rather than photosynthesis. Their roots are thick and densely clustered, forming a "birds nest" that house their fungus host. Depending on the species, the flowers can be single or held in corymbs of many individual flowers. The stems are usually pallid, with reduced scale-like foliage. The flowers can vary in colour, with white or yellow predominating, and blue and pink also occurring. Like all myco-heterotrophs, they are capable of living in very dark conditions, such as the floor of deep forests, because they no longer derive energy from sunlight.

Voyria is subdivided into two subgenera, Voyria and Leiphaimos. The latter, which contains a majority of the species, is characterized by highly reduced features, lacking both stomates and a continuous vascular cylinder. The lack of chloroplast genes has caused some difficulty in better understanding its relationships within the family. Seeds are dispersed by wind.

== Species list ==
- Voyria acuminata Benth. - Venezuela, Brazil
- Voyria alvesiana E.F.Guim., T.S.Mendes & N.G.Silva - Pará
- Voyria aphylla (Jacq.) Pers. - Caribbean, Mexico to Brazil
- Voyria aurantiaca Splitg. - Lesser Antilles, Panama to Brazil
- Voyria caerulea Aubl. - Venezuela, the Guianas, Brazil
- Voyria chionea Benth. - Colombia, Venezuela, Brazil
- Voyria clavata Splitg. - Venezuela, the Guianas, Brazil
- Voyria corymbosa Splitg. - Venezuela, the Guianas, Brazil
- Voyria crucitasensis Y.Guillén & G.Vargas - N Costa Rica
- Voyria flavescens Griseb. - Mexico to Brazil, Trinidad
- Voyria kupperi (Suess.) Ruyters & Maas - Costa Rica, Panama
- Voyria obconica Progel - Atlantic Forest of Brazil
- Voyria parasitica (Schltdl. & Cham.) Ruyters & Maas - Central America, Caribbean, S Florida
- Voyria primuloides Baker - Sierra Leone, Liberia, Ivory Coast, Cameroon, Equatorial Guinea, Gabon, Congo Republic
- Voyria pulcherrima (Standl.) L.O.Williams - Panama
- Voyria rosea Aubl. - Venezuela and the Guianas
- Voyria spruceana Benth. - Costa Rica to Brazil
- Voyria tenella Guilding ex Hook. - Caribbean, Mexico to Brazil
- Voyria tenuiflora Griseb. - Venezuela, the Guianas, Brazil
- Voyria truncata (Standl.) Standl. & Steyerm. - Chiapas to Colombia
