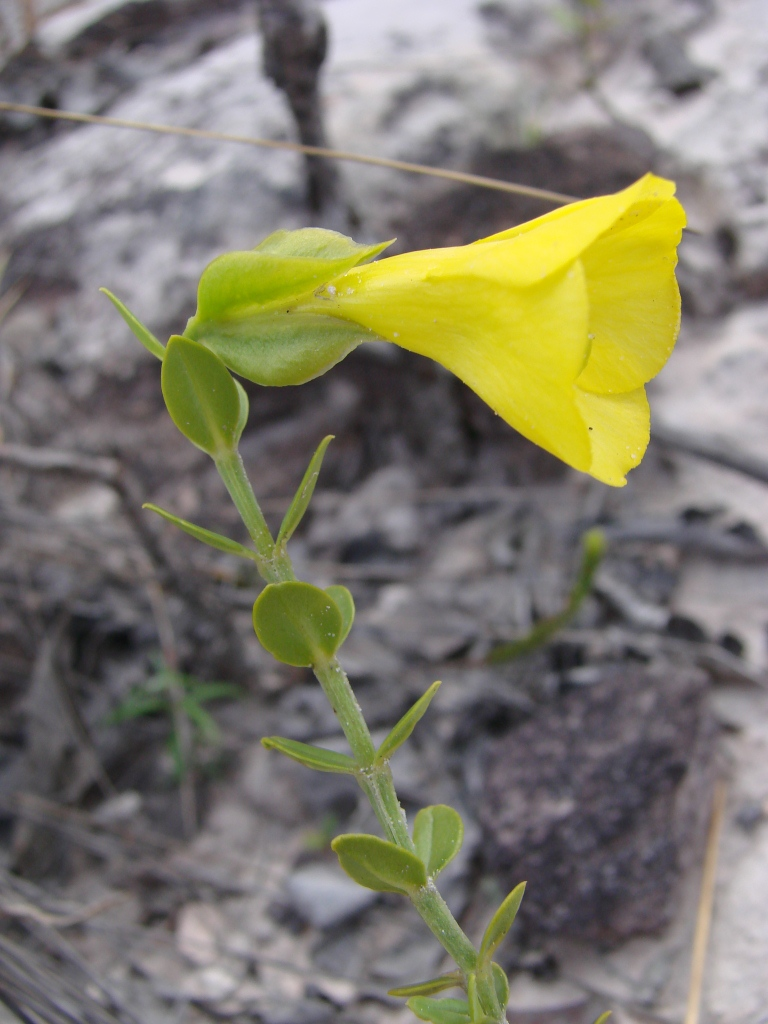
- Schultesia crenuliflora

Scientific classification
- Kingdom: Plantae
- Clade: Tracheophytes
- Clade: Angiosperms
- Clade: Eudicots
- Clade: Asterids
- Order: Gentianales
- Family: Gentianaceae
- Genus: Schultesia; Mart. (1827), nom. cons.

Species
- 16, see text

Synonyms
- Reichertia H.Karst. (1848)

= Schultesia (plant) =

Genus of plants

Schultesia is a genus of flowering plants in the family Gentianaceae. It includes 16 species native to the tropical Americas, ranging from Mexico and the Caribbean to northeastern Argentina, and to west tropical Africa from Senegal to Sierra Leone and Chad.

== Species ==
16 species are accepted.

- Schultesia angustifolia Griseb.
- Schultesia aptera Cham.
- Schultesia australis Griseb.
- Schultesia bahiensis E.F.Guim. & Fontella
- Schultesia benthamiana Klotzsch ex Griseb.
- Schultesia brachyptera Cham.
- Schultesia crenuliflora Mart.
- Schultesia doniana Progel
- Schultesia gracilis Mart.
- Schultesia guianensis (Aubl.) Malme
- Schultesia irwiniana E.F.Guim. & Fontella
- Schultesia minensis E.F.Guim. & Fontella
- Schultesia pachyphylla Griseb.
- Schultesia piresiana E.F.Guim. & Fontella
- Schultesia pohliana Progel
- Schultesia subcrenata Klotzsch ex Griseb.
