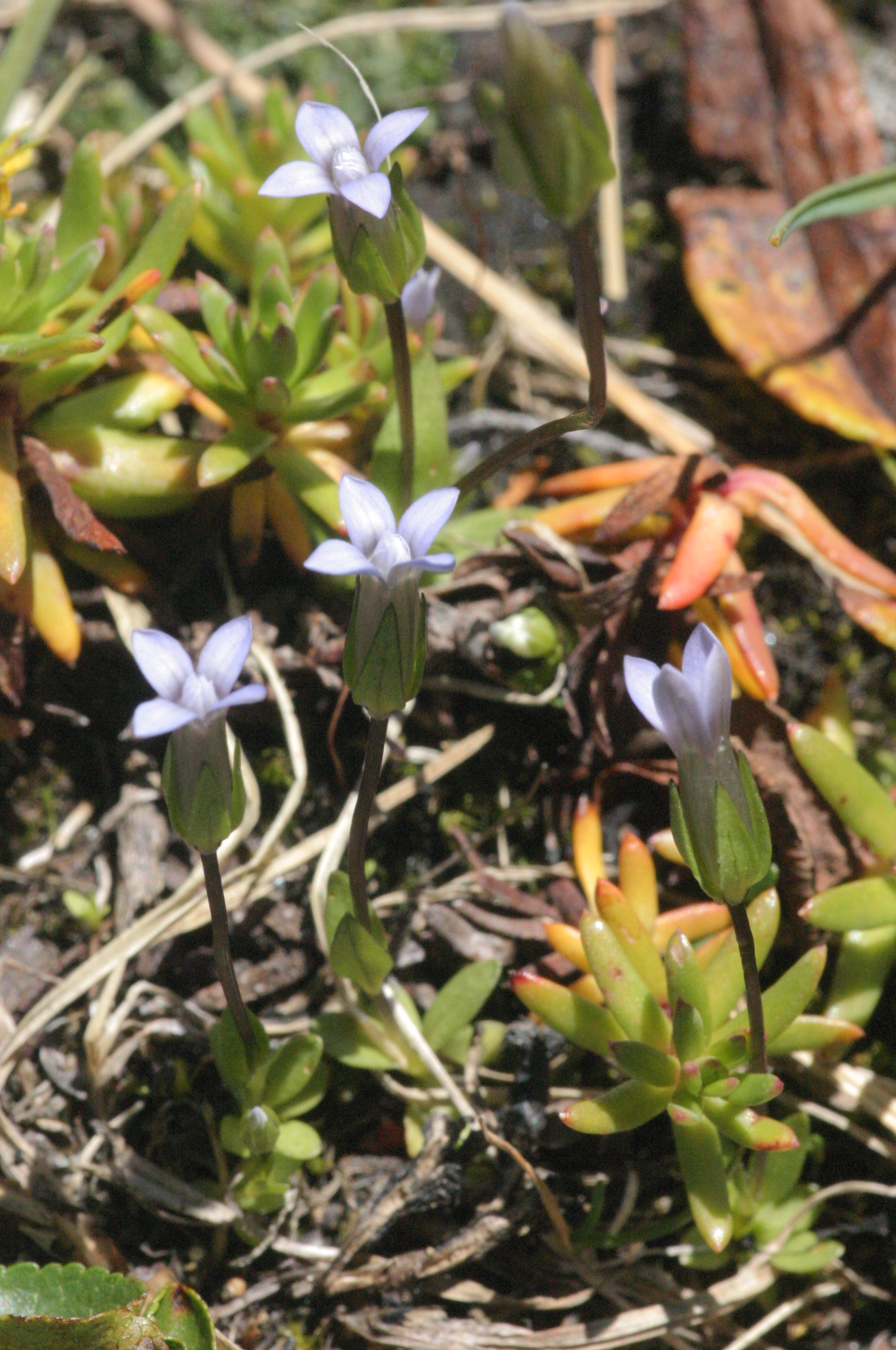
- Comastoma tenellum

Scientific classification
- Kingdom: Plantae
- Clade: Tracheophytes
- Clade: Angiosperms
- Clade: Eudicots
- Clade: Asterids
- Order: Gentianales
- Family: Gentianaceae
- Genus: Comastoma; Toyok.

= Comastoma =

Genus of flowering plants

Comastoma is a genus of flowering plants belonging to the family Gentianaceae.

Its native range is Temperate Asia to Himalaya.

Species:

- Comastoma cyananthiflorum (Franch.) Holub
- Comastoma dechyanum (Sommier & Levier) Holub
