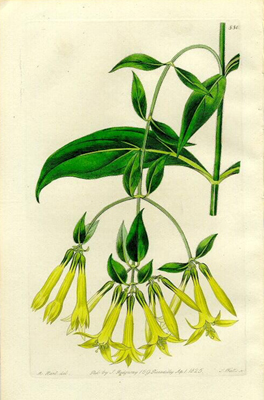

Scientific classification
- Kingdom: Plantae
- Clade: Tracheophytes
- Clade: Angiosperms
- Clade: Eudicots
- Clade: Asterids
- Order: Gentianales
- Family: Gentianaceae
- Genus: Lisianthius; P.Browne

= Lisianthius =

Genus of plants

Lisianthius is a genus of flowering plants belonging to the family Gentianaceae.

Its native range is Mexico to Colombia, Caribbean.

Species:

- Lisianthius adamsii Weaver
- Lisianthius aurantiacus Sytsma
- Lisianthius auratus Standl.
- Lisianthius auriculatus Benth.
- Lisianthius axillaris (Hemsl.) Kuntze
- Lisianthius brevidentatus (Hemsl.) Kuntze
- Lisianthius calciphilus Standl. & Steyerm.
- Lisianthius capitatus Urb.
- Lisianthius cordifolius L.
- Lisianthius cuspidatus Bertol.
- Lisianthius domingensis Urb.
- Lisianthius exsertus Sw.
- Lisianthius glandulosus A.Rich.
- Lisianthius habuensis Sytsma
- Lisianthius jefensis A.Robyns & T.S.Elias
- Lisianthius latifolius Sw.
- Lisianthius laxiflorus Urb.
- Lisianthius longifolius L.
- Lisianthius meianthus Donn.Sm.
- Lisianthius nigrescens Schltdl. & Cham.
- Lisianthius oreopolus B.L.Rob.
- Lisianthius peduncularis L.O.Williams
- Lisianthius perkinsiae Struwe & Weaver
- Lisianthius quichensis Donn.Sm.
- Lisianthius saponarioides Schltdl. & Cham.
- Lisianthius seemannii (Griseb.) Kuntze
- Lisianthius silenifolius (Griseb.) Urb.
- Lisianthius skinneri (Hemsl.) Kuntze
- Lisianthius spathulatus Kunth
- Lisianthius troyanus Urb.
- Lisianthius umbellatus Sw.
- Lisianthius viscidiflorus B.L.Rob.
- Lisianthius weaveri Sytsma
