= Aline Marie Raynal =

French botanist (1937–2022)

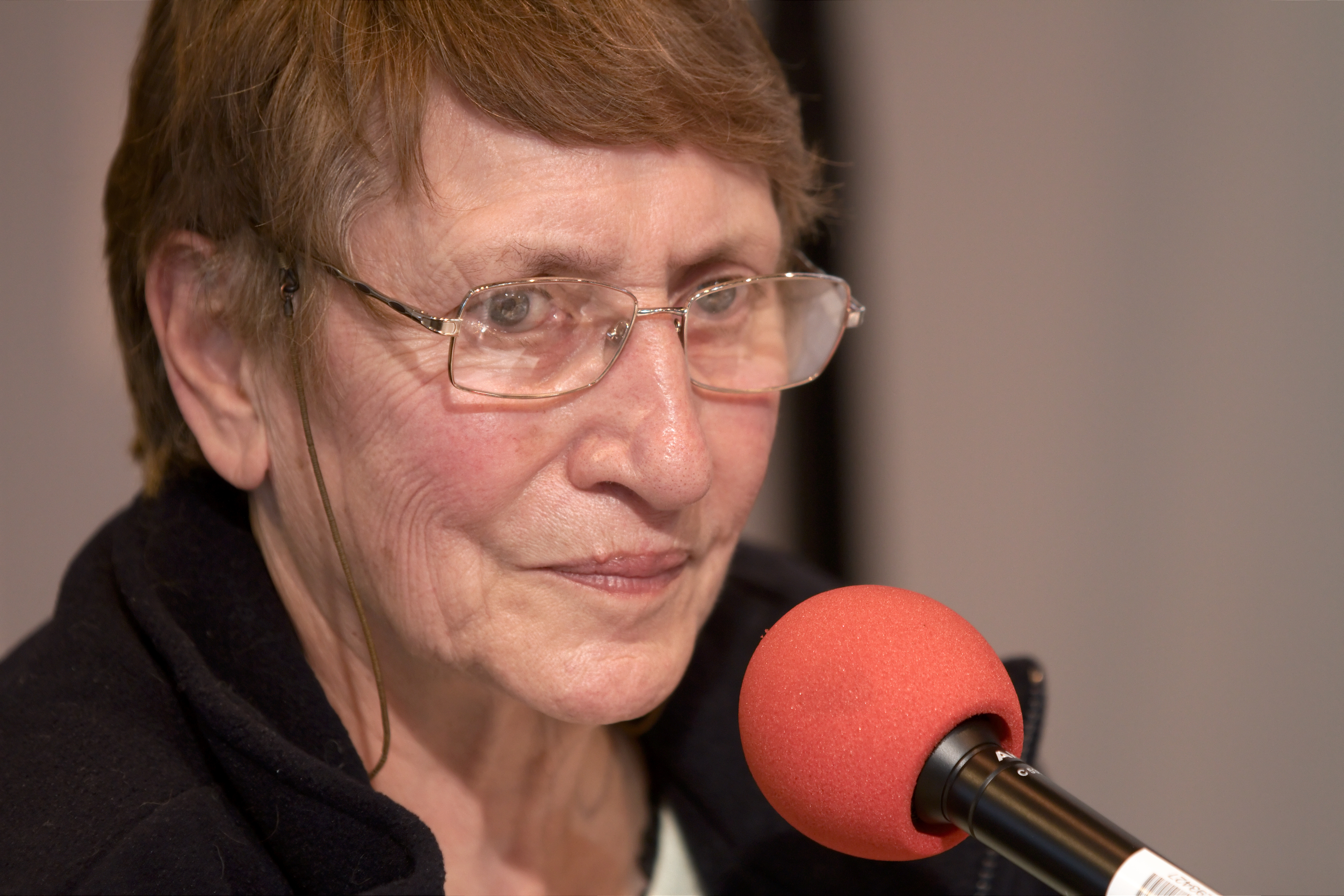
- Aline Marie Raynal in 2010
- Born: February 4, 1937; Paris, France
- Died: July 16, 2022 (aged 85); Périgueux, France
- Scientific career
- Fields: Botany
- Institutions: Muséum National d´Histoire Naturelle de Paris
- Author abbrev. (botany): A.Raynal

Aline Marie Raynal (4 February 1937 – 16 July 2022) was a French botanist and botanical illustrator noted for studying the taxonomy of parasitic and aquatic tropical plants, as well as plants of the Sahel desert in Africa.

== Biography ==
She was professor of botany at the Muséum National d´Histoire Naturelle de Paris. In 1995, her work was honored by the Institut de France. The minor planet 8651 Alineraynal was named in her honor. The standard author abbreviation A.Raynal is used to indicate this person as the author when citing a botanical name.

Raynal died on July 16, 2022, at the age of 85.

== Works ==
- Raynal, Aline Marie; Symoens, J. J.; Keraudren-Aymonin, Monique (1974). Flore d′Afrique centrale [d'Afrique] : (Zaïre – Rwanda – Burundi). Spermatophytes. Aponogetonaceae (in French). Jardin Botanique National de Belgique.
- Raynal-Roques, Aline (1963). Flore et végétation des environs de Kayar (Sénégal): (de la côte au lac Tanma) (in French). Faculté des sciences, Université de Dakar. OCLC 19916939.
- Raynal-Roques, Aline; Roguenant, Albert (2015). Dessiner et photographier les fleurs: le guide pratique du parfait botaniste (in French). Belin. OCLC 912279884.
