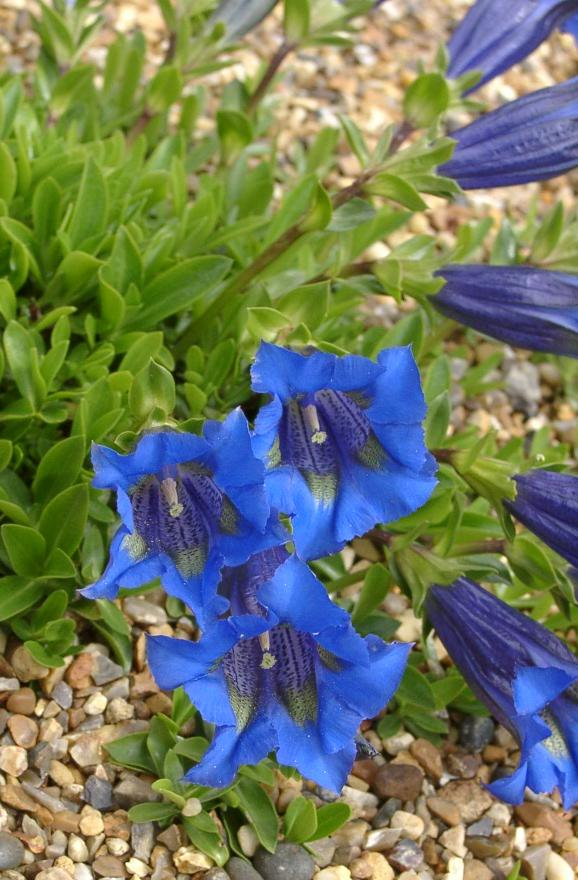
- Gentiana acaulis

Scientific classification
- Kingdom: Plantae
- Clade: Tracheophytes
- Clade: Angiosperms
- Clade: Eudicots
- Clade: Asterids
- Order: Gentianales
- Family: Gentianaceae; Juss.

Type genus
- Gentiana L.

Synonyms
- Saccifoliaceae

= Gentianaceae =

Family of flowering plants

Gentianaceae is a family of flowering plants of 105 genera and about 1650 species. Species in this family inhabit every continent except the Antarctic, and have been used around the world for centuries as traditional medicine.

== Etymology ==
The family was named by Linnaeus in 1753. It takes its name from the genus Gentiana, named after the Illyrian king Gentius. Gentius ruled the Ilyrian kindgdom from 181-168 BCE, and was said to have used a local Gentian plant to treat malaria in his troops.

== Distribution ==
Distribution is cosmopolitan. Gentianaceae occur on all continents except Antarctica, although diversity is highest in temperate and subtropical regions. Species of Gentianaceae often inhabit alpine and subalpine habitats.

== Characteristics ==
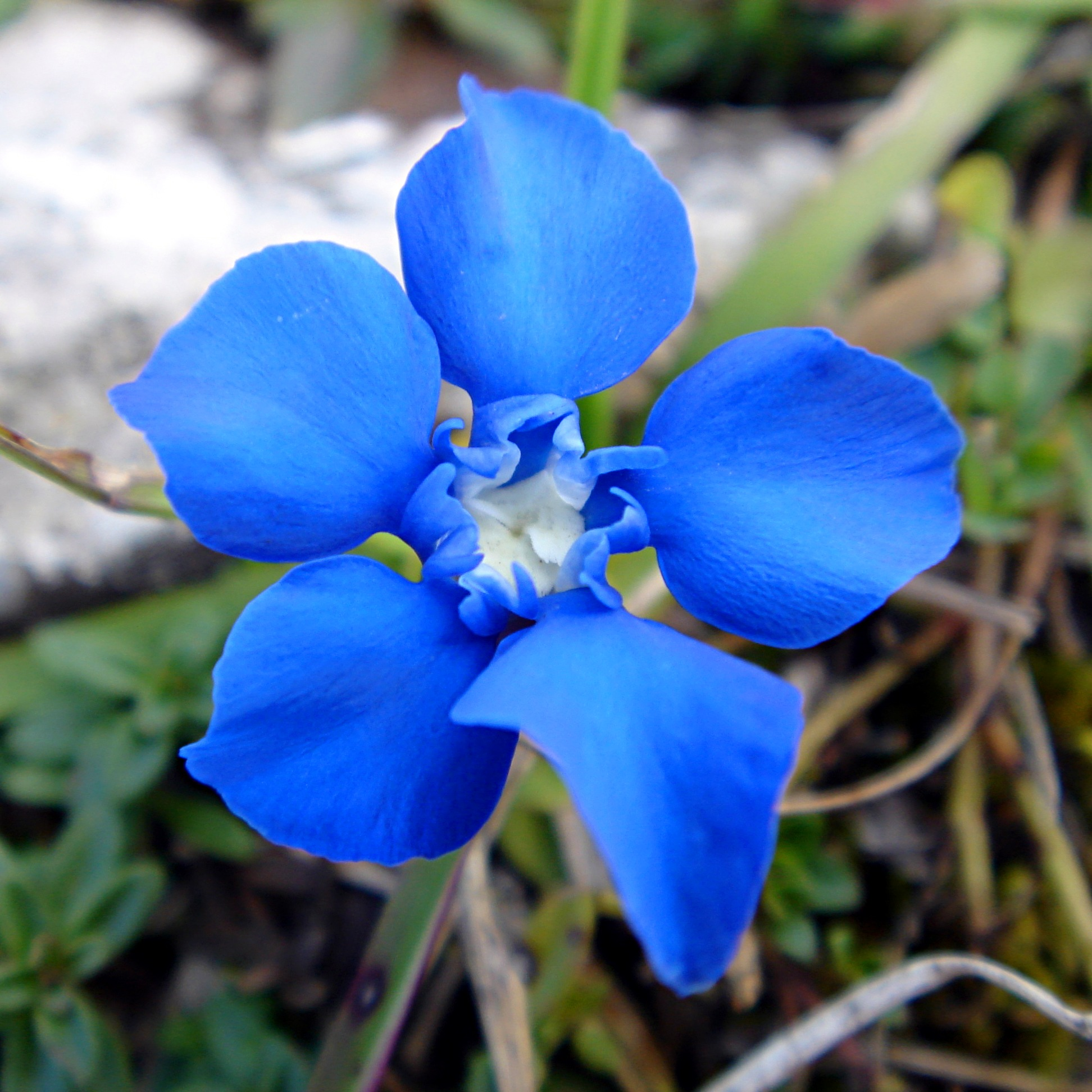
Gentiana verna, or Spring Gentian, is a small gentian that grows to only a few centimeters. It is distributed across Europe, the Caucuses, and parts of Asia.

The family consists of herbs, shrubs, and a few trees. The family shows a wide range of colors and floral patterns. Flowers are actinomorphic and bisexual with fused sepals and petals. The stamens are attached to the inside of the petals (epipetalous) and alternate with the corolla lobes. There is a glandular disk at the base of the gynoecium, and flowers have parietal placentation. The inflorescence is cymose, with simple or complex cymes. The fruits are dehiscent septicidal capsules splitting into two halves, rarely some species have a berry. Seeds are small with copiously oily endosperms and a straight embryo. The habit varies from small trees, pachycaul shrubs to (usually) herbs, with ascending, erect or twining stems. Plants are usually rhizomatous. Plants have opposite leaves, less often alternate or in some species whorled. Leaves simple in shape, with entire edges and bases connately attached to the stem. Stipules are absent. Plants usually accumulate bitter iridoid substances; bicollateral bundles are present.

== Ecology ==
Partial myco-heterotrophy is common among species in this family. A few genera such as Voyria and Voyriella lack chlorophyll entirely and are fully myco-heterotrophic.

Gentianaceae species have a variety of pollination mechanisms including pollination by bees, hummingbirds, bats, and moths. Their seeds are dispersed by mammals, bats, birds, and wind. Despite some species having a bitter taste, gentians can be eaten by butterfly larvae, moths, beetles, and mammals such as deer.

Species in the genera Fagraea, Anthocleista, Tachia, Chelonanthus, and Swertia can have ecological interactions with ants. Ants will visit nectaries, calyces, petioles, and sometimes live in the hollow stems of gentians.

== Biogeographic history ==
According to Merckx et al., the neotropics were an important area for the early diversification events in Gentianaceae, most of which occurring during the Eocene. However, Pirie et al. suggested that ancient vicariance cannot be ruled out as an explanation for the early origins of Exaceae across Africa, Madagascar and the Indian subcontinent.

Gentiana calycosa growing in the eastern Sierra Nevada in California.

In 2016, Favre et al. used phylogenetic reconstruction to find that early early diversification and dispersal of the Gentiana and Gentianinae occurred in the Qinghai-Tibet Plateau region. As the plateau lifted starting 50 million years ago, there was increased altitudinal zonation and many unique habitat niches in a small area. Gentiana species dispersed from the Qinghai-Tibet Plateau and surrounding areas to Taiwan, eastern China, North and South America, Australia, and New Guinea starting in the mid-Miocene era.

== Uses ==
Gentians have been used as traditional medicine for centuries in China, Tibet, India and Iran. They contain bioactive compounds such as xanthones, iridoids, and flavonoids. These compounds give them anti-inflammatory, anti-melanogenic, anti-ischemic, anti-fibrotic, and antioxidant properties. Gentians have been used to treat and prevent dermatological diseases, menstrual over-bleeding, conjunctivitis, venom poisoning, injuries, infected wounds, and pain and swelling of organs. There is research being done currently on how compounds in gentians can be used in modern medicine.

== Taxonomy ==
The family Gentianaceae was first described by Antoine Laurent de Jussieu in 1789. It is one of five families in the Gentianales, which is within the Asterid clade. The other families are Apocynaceae, Gelsimiaceae, Loganiaceae, and Rubiaceae. The Gentianaceae family contains six tribes according to Struwe, et al. (2002).

=== Tribes ===
- Gentianaceae
  - Saccifolieae
  - - Exaceae
    - - Chironieae
      - - Helieae
        - Potalieae
        - Gentianeae

- tribe Chironieae (G.Don) Endl.
  - subtribe Canscorinae Thiv & Kadereit
  - subtribe Chironiinae G.Don
  - subtribe Coutoubeinae G.Don
- tribe Exaceae Colla
- tribe Gentianeae Colla
  - subtribe Gentianinae G.Don
  - subtribe Swertiinae (Griseb.) Rchb.
- tribe Helieae Gilg
- tribe Potalieae Rchb.
  - subtribe Faroinae Struwe & V.A.Albert
  - subtribe Lisianthiinae G.Don
  - subtribe Potaliinae (Mart.) Progel
- tribe Saccifolieae (Maguire & Pires) Struwe, Thiv, V.A.Albert & Kadereit
- the group Voyrieae is incertae sedis, or not classified. It contains the 19 species of the Voyria Gilg genus.

=== Genera ===
105 genera are accepted.

- Adenolisianthus (Spruce ex Progel) Gilg
- Anthocleista Afzel. ex R.Br.
- Aripuana Struwe, Maas & V.A.Albert
- Bartonia Muhl. ex Willd.
- Bisgoeppertia Kuntze
- Blackstonia Huds.
- Calolisianthus Gilg
- Canscora Lam.
- Celiantha Maguire
- Centaurium Hill
- Chelonanthus (Griseb.) Gilg
- Chironia L.
- Chorisepalum Gleason & Wodehouse
- Cicendia Adans.
- Comastoma Toyok.
- Congolanthus A.Raynal
- Coutoubea Aubl.
- Cracosna Gagnep.
- Crawfurdia Wall.
- Curtia Cham. & Schltdl.
- Cyrtophyllum Reinw.
- Deianira Cham. & Schltdl.
- Djaloniella P.Taylor
- Duplipetala Thiv
- Enicostema Blume
- Eustoma Salisb.
- Exaculum Caruel
- Exacum L.
- Exochaenium Griseb.
- Fagraea Thunb.
- Faroa Welw.
- Frasera Walter
- Geniostemon Engelm. & A.Gray
- Gentiana Tourn. ex L.
- Gentianella Moench
- Gentianopsis Ma
- Gentianothamnus Humbert
- Gyrandra Griseb.
- Halenia Borkh.
- Helia Mart.
- Hockinia Gardner
- Hoppea Willd.
- Irlbachia Mart.
- Ixanthus Griseb.
- Jaeschkea Kurz
- Karina Boutique
- Klackenbergia Kissling
- Kuepferia Adr.Favre
- Lagenanthus Gilg
- Lagenias E.Mey.
- Latouchea Franch.
- Lehmanniella Gilg
- Limahlania K.M.Wong & Sugumaran
- Lisianthius P.Browne
- Lomatogoniopsis T.N.Ho & S.W.Liu
- Lomatogonium A.Braun
- Macrocarpaea (Griseb.) Gilg
- Megacodon (Hemsl.) Harry Sm.
- Metagentiana T.N.Ho & S.W.Liu
- Microrphium C.B.Clarke
- Neblinantha Maguire
- Neurotheca Salisb. ex Benth. & Hook.f.
- Obolaria L.
- Oreonesion A.Raynal
- Ornichia Klack.
- Orphium E.Mey.
- Phyllocyclus Kurz
- Picrophloeus Blume
- Potalia Aubl.
- Prepusa Mart.
- Pterygocalyx Maxim.
- Purdieanthus Gilg
- Pycnosphaera Gilg
- Rogersonanthus Maguire & B.M.Boom
- Roraimaea Struwe, S.Nilsson & V.A.Albert
- Sabatia Adans.
- Saccifolium Maguire & Pires
- Schenkia Griseb.
- Schinziella Gilg
- Schultesia Mart.
- Sebaea Sol. ex R.Br.
- Senaea Taub.
- Sinogentiana Adr.Favre & Y.M.Yuan
- Sinoswertia T.N.Ho, S.W.Liu & J.Q.Liu
- Sipapoantha Maguire & B.M.Boom
- Swertia L.
- Symbolanthus G.Don
- Symphyllophyton Gilg
- Tachia Aubl.
- Tachiadenus Griseb.
- Tapeinostemon Benth.
- Tetrapollinia Maguire & B.M.Boom
- Tripterospermum Blume
- Tubella Archila
- Urogentias Gilg & Gilg-Ben.
- Utania G.Don
- Valdesiana Z.Díaz & M.Escudero
- Veratrilla Franch.
- Voyria Aubl.
- Voyriella (Miq.) Miq.
- Xestaea Griseb.
- Yanomamua J.R.Grant, Maas & Struwe
- Zeltnera G.Mans.
- Zonanthus Griseb.
- Zygostigma Griseb.
