= Rehoboth =

Rehoboth may refer to:

- Rehoboth (Bible), the name of three Biblical places

== Places ==
=== Israel ===
- Rehoboth, the conventional English name for Rehovot
- Rehovot-in-the-Negev, archaeological site (Nabataean and Byzantine city)

=== Namibia ===
- Rehoboth, Namibia
- Rehoboth Ratepayers' Association
- Rehoboth (homeland), a Baster territory in South West Africa (present-day Namibia)

=== United States ===
- Rehoboth Beach, Delaware
- Rehoboth, DeKalb County, Georgia
- Rehoboth, Harris County, Georgia
- Rehoboth (Eldorado, Maryland), listed on the National Register of Historic Places in Dorchester County, Maryland
- Rehoboth, Massachusetts
- Rehoboth, New Mexico
- Rehoboth (Chappaqua, New York), listed on the National Register of Historic Places in Westchester County, New York
- Rehoboth, Perry County, Ohio
- Rehoboth, Seneca County, Ohio

=== Other places ===
- Rehoboth Christian College, Perth, Western Australia
- Rehoboth Specialist Hospital, Nigeria

== Other uses ==
- 145475 Rehoboth, an asteroid
- Rehoboth Bay, Delaware, United States
- Rehoboth Christian School, Rehoboth, New Mexico, United States
- USS Rehoboth, the name of more than one United States Navy ship

== See also ==
- Rehobeth (disambiguation)
- Rehoboth Carpenter family
