= Rehoboth Uprising =

1924–25 revolt in South West Africa

The Rehoboth Uprising of 1924-25 was the bloodless revolt of the Rehoboth Baster against the South African Administration in South West Africa. The revolt was caused by diminishing Baster autonomy and territory, as a result of Administration policies.

The Uprising saw all sovereignty, autonomy, and power ceded from the Baster Council, the Baster magistrate and the Captain, to the South African government.

== Background ==
The Rehoboth area was originally inhabited by the Nama people of the Khoekhoe. In 1844, it was given the biblical name of "Rehoboth" by Franz Heinrich Kleinschmidt of the German Rhenish Missionary Society.

During the eighteenth century, the Baster community emerged from the descendants of white, often Dutch or German, colonial men and Khoisan women. Two Baster communities originally existed: one which settled in East Griqualand led by Adam Kok, and the other which emigrated from Cape Colony to settle in Rehoboth, South West Africa in 1870. The Rehoboth Basters, led by Hermanus van Wyk, formed their community on rigid "constitutional and religious beliefs, which were maintained by organised structures such as their elected council".

However, by the late nineteenth century, the future of the Baster community in Rehoboth was threatened by the consistency of attacks waged by the Namas and Hereros. Such existential concerns served as the catalyst for the Treaty of Protection and Friendship, signed on 15 September 1885, and a further treaty relating to defence between the German Empire and the Rehoboth Basters on 26 July 1895. The Treaty "recognised the rights and liberties of the Basters in Rehoboth" and allowed for internal matters to be resolved by the Baster Council. Any disputes between the Basters and external parties, however, were resolved by the German colonial administration.

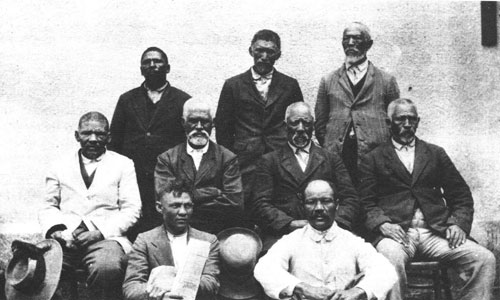
Rehoboth Baster Council in 1915, with Cornelius van Wyk third from left

As the First World War waged, the German Empire rescinded its treaties with the Rehoboth Basters, with the latter subsequently seeking support from the Union of South Africa. The German forces then mobilised to attack the Basters in May 1915 for their "treasonous act of seeking assistance from the Union". The German attack left over 30 Basters dead and wounded.

The Union Defence Force (UDF) did not come to the rescue of the Basters, due to the German retreat from Rehoboth and subsequent deployment to meet the UDF head on. On 9 July 1915, German colonial administrator Theodor Seitz and commander-in-chief of the Schutztruppe Victor Franke surrendered to the UDF.

Martial law was imposed and the Basters remained in Rehoboth, seeking to both "regain their...independence and...recover the land taken from them". The autonomous status of the Basters was reinstated during the First World War, with the Baster Council resuming all internal administrative activities.

== Prelude ==
On 9 January 1922, a draft agreement was struck on how Rehoboth would be governed. Negotiations between Gysbert Hofmeyr, the South African administrator, and the Baster Council stifled in 1922, resuming on 16 July 1923. The negotiations focused on two key issues: that of Baster self-governance and the issue of territory. These issues remained unresolved after negotiations and "the boundaries remained unchanged despite the Basters' objections".

The Baster community opposed the Hofmeyr agreement, which was ratified through Proclamation No. 28 of 1923. South Africa organised festivals to celebrate the agreement, many of which were boycotted by the Basters, and Samuel Beukes, the first Namibian petitioner to the League of Nations, organised the opposition to form the Majority Party. By November 1923, the Majority Party had rallied the Baster community to reject the agreement and had successfully instigated a campaign of passive resistance. Colonial administration's orders and proclamations were disregarded and taxes went unpaid.

== Rebellion ==
The Majority Party organised local elections and won all the seats available in the Baster Council, which refused to meet with the South African Administrator. In response, South Africa issued Proclamation No. 13 of 1924, decrying that the Baster Council was illegitimately elected and that new elections were to be held in the June. The new elections of 16 June 1924 were boycotted and the Baster Council continued to govern over Rehoboth, "collecting taxes, making their own laws and issuing their own permits".

On 10 December 1924, the South African Administration issued Proclamation No. 31 of 1924, which suspended all powers of the Captains of the Rehoboth Baster, the Captain's Council, and the Baster Council and transferred them to Maj. C.N. Manning. In addition to the Proclamation, the Administration ramped up police presence and patrols in the area. In March 1925, Manning summoned Toko Koopman, a new member of the Baster Council, Piet Diergaardt, the Baster magistrate, and Samuel Buekes, the leader of the Majority Party. Such summonses were ignored and warrants for their arrests were issued. The first attempt to exact these warrants was met with resistance and defiance. In response, "the Administrator mobilised the citizen force in nine districts and declared martial law in Rehoboth." The prelude for the rebellion was established.

On 5 April 1925, a combined force of 621 citizen troops and police surrounded Rehoboth with the objective of securing the arrest of Koopman, Diergaardt, and Buekes. The Administrator issues an ultimatum to the Baster Council at 07:00, demanding the "unconditional surrender of [the Baster], the handing over of weapons and those...for whom warrants of arrest had been issued." De Jager threatened the use of violence if this ultimatum was not met by 08:00. The police moved in after resistance and the men in question were arrested.

The Administration relied fundamentally on the presence of aeroplanes, which successfully rounded the Baster population up, without firing a single shot, providing the "psychological edge by making diving sorties over [Rehoboth]".
