= Dap Izaaks =

Namibian politician

David Jacobus "Dap" Izaaks (1932/1933–2005), also known as Oom Dap, was a Namibian Baster politician who served as Acting Captain of the Rehoboth Baster between February 1998 and January 1999. He also served as Mayor of Rehoboth.

== Life and death ==
In 1968, Izaaks founded the Rehoboth People's Party. He was interim Baster Captain, after the death of Johannes Diergaardt, from 12 February 1998 to 11 January 1999. Izaaks lost the 1999 election as Baster Captain to John McNab. Izaaks received 17.6 per cent of the vote.

Izaaks died on 21 October 2005, after a road traffic collision in Windhoek.
