= Federal Convention of Namibia =

- Leader: Hans Diergaardt (until 1998, his death); Kephes Conradie (since 1998)
- Founded: 1988
- Headquarters: Rehoboth, Namibia

The Federal Convention of Namibia (FCN) was a political party based in Rehoboth, Namibia. It was created in the wake of Namibian independence in 1988 by a merger of several smaller parties and gained a seat in the Namibian Constituent Assembly. After also-ran results in 1994 and 1999 it ceased to be publicly active.

== History ==
The FCN was formed in 1988 by a merger of several smaller parties:

- Baster Kaptein Hans Diergaardt's Rehoboth Free Democratic Party
- Democratic Action for Namas (DAN)
- Liberated Democratic Party (LDP)
- National Progressive Party (NPP)
- United Liberation Movement (ULM)
- Namibian People's Liberation Front (NPLF), which itself consisted of several smaller parties
- Mburumba Kerina's NUDO Progressive Party (NUDO-PP)

The FCN was led by Diergaardt until his death in 1998. After that, Kephes Conradie took over the leadership of the party. The party contested Namibia's legislative elections from 1989 to 1999.

== Electoral results ==
In the 1989 election, FCN received 10,452 total votes, which allotted it one seat in the Namibian Constituent Assembly. In the former Coloured homeland, the party received twenty-nine percent of the total vote, less than the Democratic Turnhalle Alliance and SWAPO parties. This result, surprising as Diergaardt was Kaptein of the Rehoboth Basters at that time, was attributed to Diergaardt's secession plans for the territory around Rehoboth. Diergaardt took FCN's sole Constituent Assembly seat but soon resigned on health grounds. Kerina took over from him and was elected Deputy Speaker of the house.

In the 1994 Namibian parliamentary election, the party failed to earn a seat and received just 1,166 total votes. In the 1999 Namibian parliamentary election, it received just 764 total votes, ranking last among the parties contesting the election. It did not contest the 2004 Namibian parliamentary election.

== See also ==
- Political parties in Namibia
