= Captains of the Rehoboth Baster =

Traditional leaders of Baster community

Flag of the Rehoboth Basters

The Captains of the Rehoboth Baster (Afrikaans: Kapteins van die Rehoboth Baster) were the traditional leaders of the indigenous Baster community in central Namibia, until the dissolution of the Rehoboth Homeland in 1990, upon Namibian independence.

The 1990 Constitution of Namibia does not give the same special rights to the Rehoboth Baster as the other traditional leaderships of Namibia. The Baster Council, and the Rehoboth population, still elect a Captain today, but this has no autonomy or powers associated with it, like the other traditional leaderships under the Namibian constitution.

== History ==
The first Captain (Kaptein) was Hermanus van Wyk, who led the Baster nation to Rehoboth in German South West Africa from the Northern Cape of South Africa to escape the rampant racial discrimination. He served as Baster Captain from 1868 until his death in 1905.

Upon the death of van Wyk, the German colonial government established a separate council. It was not until South African forces took over German South West Africa as a British protectorate in 1914, that the Rehoboth Basters elected another Captain - Cornelius van Wyk.

In 1924, South Africa legally transferred all powers of the Baster Captain to the South African-controlled Rehoboth Magistrate through Proclmation No. 31. Following a devastating defeat in the Baster Uprising of 1925, the third Baster Captain, Albert Mouton, was overthrown de facto by the South Africans.

In 1977, two years before the establishment of the Rehoboth Homeland, Ben Africa was elected as the fourth Baster Captain, serving until 1979 upon the successful reversal of the 1976 election by Hans Diergaardt. Diergaardt's tenure oversaw the independence of Namibia in March 1990, and the subsequent loss of traditional leadership powers under the new constitution. Diergaardt served from 1979 until his death in 1998.

Dap Izaaks served as interim Captain until the election of John McNab in 1999, who would oversee the Rehoboth Basters' admission to the Unrepresented Nations and Peoples Organization (UNPO).

== List of Captains of the Rehoboth Baster ==
- Hermanus van Wyk (1835-1905) - 1868–1905; his death
- Cornelius van Wyk (?-1924) - 1914–1924; his death
- Albert Mouton (?-?) - 1924-1925
- Ben Africa (1938- ) - 1977-1979
- Johannes Diergaardt (1927-1998) - 1979–1998; his death
- Dap Izaaks (?-2005) - 1998-1999 (interim)
- John McNab (1934/35-2020) - 1999-2020
  - Martin Dentlinger (?-) - interim 2018-2020
- Martin Dentlinger; confirmed by the Baster Burgher Volksraad on 1 November 2020 (disputed)
- Barney Buys (?-2020) - October 2020-November 2020 (disputed)
- Jacky Britz (?-) - since 24 April 2021 (disputed)
