= Rehoboth area =

- Flag

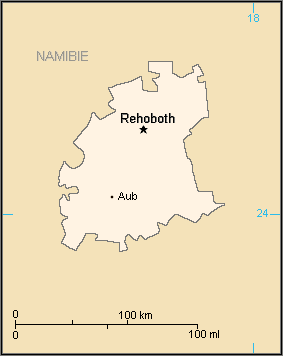
- Constitution: 31 January 1872
- Amendment: 1 January 1874
- Recognition: 15 September 1885
- Declaration of Independence: 20 March 1990
- Founder: Hermanus van Wyk
- Seat: Rehoboth

Government
  - Body: Baster Council
  - Captain: Jacky Britz (United People's Movement)

Area
  - Land: 14,216 km^{2} (5,489 sq mi)

Population
  - Total: 35,000
- Time zone: UTC+2

The Rehoboth area, historically the Free Republic of Rehoboth (German: Freie Republik Rehoboth) is an unrecognized state in central Namibia, inhabited by the indigenous Baster people.

Between 1979 and 1989, the area was a South West African bantustan.

== Background ==
The first provisions for establishing a Rehoboth government were made on 15 December 1868, in Warmbad, German South West Africa.

The state constitution of the Rehoboth area was based on the initial constitution of 31 January 1872. The original constitution was amended on 1 January 1874.

On 15 September 1885, through the 'Treaty of Protection and Friendship Between the German Empire and the Basters of Rehoboth of 1885', the independence of the Rehoboth Basters was first recognised.

The Rehoboth Basters are not recognised as a traditional ethnic community of Namibia, unlike other ethnic groups. From February 2007 to December 2019, the Rehoboth Basters were members of the Unrepresented Nations and Peoples Organization (UNPO).

== Geography ==
Rehoboth area includes the Rehoboth Homeland bantustan which existed until 1989. It is 14,216 square kilometres in area, and has a population of around 35,000. The capital is Rehoboth.

== Politics ==
On 20 March 1990, the representatives of the Rehoboth Baster, the Captain-led Baster Council (Basterrat) declared independence from South West Africa. A day later, Namibia became independent from South Africa.

The government is formed by the Captains Council (Kapteinsraad), which is headed currently by Captain Jacky Britz, who was elected as leader in April 2021, defeating Rynault van Wyk. This election result, however, is currently disputed in the Windhoek High Court by van Wyk.

Nationally, the Rehoboth Baster are represented by the United People's Movement.
