= Albert Mouton =

South-West African military officer

Albert Mouton was the third Captain of the Rehoboth Baster in South West Africa from 1924 to 1925.

Mouton succeeded Cornelius van Wyk on April 26, 1924. Mouton's tenure as captain was short-lived, having been overthrown on 5 April 1925, after the South African invasion of the Rehoboth area. As a result of the Baster Rebellion of 1925, the office of the Baster Captain was abolished and the special rights and de facto independence of the area revoked.

It was not until 1977 that the fourth Captain of the Baster, Ben Africa, was elected.

== See also ==
- Rehoboth Uprising
