= Rehoboth Ratepayers' Association =

Political party in Namibia

- Founder: Hans Diergaardt
- Founded: 1998; 28 years ago
- Headquarters: Rehoboth, Namibia

The Rehoboth Ratepayers' Association (RRA) is a local political party in Rehoboth, Namibia. It is closely affiliated with Namibia's Baster community which is centered in Rehoboth. The party was formed in 1998 by Baster leader Hans Diergaardt to contest the 1998 local elections. Despite Diergaardt's death in February 1998, the party continued to run candidates. In 2009, the party's leader and first secretary was Lukas de Klerk.

== Election results ==
=== 2009 general election ===
For the 2009 general election, RRA signed a five-year electoral cooperation agreement with the All People's Party. With the agreement, 2-5 RRA members were listed on the electoral list of the APP and the APP agreed not to run a candidate in Rehoboth in the 2010 local elections. RRA leader de Klerk said the agreement was a way for Rehoboth to have representation in the National Assembly of Namibia. He was listed at the sixth position for the APP on the list for the National Assembly but the APP won only 1 seat, which went to APP leader Ignatius Shixwameni.

=== 2010 local elections ===
In the 2010 local and regional elections RRA ran a campaign for the local authority of Rehoboth and finished in fourth in the town with 360 total votes.
