= Piet Junius =

Namibian politician (1941–2021)

- Born: Petrus Matheus Junius; 1941; Rehoboth, South West Africa (modern-day Namibia)
- Died: 3 April 2021 (age 79); Windhoek, Namibia
- Resting place: Kurunab Farm
- Political party: Democratic Turnhalle Association
- Spouse: Nelly Junius

Petrus "Piet" Matheus Junius (1941 – 3 April 2021) was a Namibian politician who served as the Deputy Education Minister of the Interim Namibian Government from 1985 to 1989.

Junius also served as vice-president of the Democratic Turnhalle Association between 1985 and 1989.

== Life and death ==
Junius was born in Rehoboth, South West Africa in 1941. Junius attended the Teachers Training College in Johannesburg, South Africa, graduating with a diploma. He went on to work as both a farmer and a teacher in Namibia.

In 1971, alongside Ben Africa and John McNab, Junius founded the Rehoboth Baster Association (RBA). The RBA sought to represent Baster interests in the Rehoboth region. In 1977, the RBA merged with the Democratic Turnhalle Alliance to create the Popular Democratic Movement.

Junius served as the Deputy Minister for National Education and Public Service in the cabinet of the Transitional Government of National Unity between 1985 and 1989.

Throughout the same period, Junius served as vice-chairman of the Democratic Turnhalle Association (DTA). He was expelled from the RBA in 1986, becoming the leader of the Progressive People's Party in the same year. In 1989, Junius founded, and became president of, the Christian Democratic Party. At the same time, he became a member of the Namibian Constituent Assembly. From 1990 to 2003, Junius was a member of the Namibian lower house, the National Assembly, representing the DTA.

In 2018, Junius was elected as the president of the United People's Movement - the political organization of the Baster people. On 3 April 2021, Junius died from a coronavirus-induced heart attack, in Windhoek, at the age of 79. He was buried on his Kurunab farmstead, about 37 miles south of Rehoboth.
