= Rehoboth Urban East =

Electoral constituency in Namibia

Coordinates: 23°19′00″S 17°04′54″E

Rehoboth Urban East constituency (red) in the Hardap Region

Rehoboth Urban East is an electoral constituency in the Hardap region of Namibia, comprising the suburbs of Rehoboth that are situated to the east of the national road B1, covering an area of 288 km^{2} (111 sq mi). It had a population of 18,035 in 2011, up from 12,891 in 2001. As of 2020 the constituency had 12,112 registered voters.

== Politics ==
Rehoboth is traditionally a stronghold of the South West Africa People's Organization (SWAPO) party. In the 2004 regional election, SWAPO candidate Edward Alfred Wambo received 2,704 of the 4,869 votes cast and became councillor.

The 2015 regional elections again saw Wambo (SWAPO) reelected with 3,250 votes. Frans Josef Bertolini of the United People's Movement (UPM) came second with 1,090 votes, followed by Marius ǃKharigub of the Rally for Democracy and Progress (RDP, 393 votes) and Johannes Lukas de Klerk of the Democratic Turnhalle Alliance (DTA, 227 votes). Wambo was narrowly reelected in the 2020 regional election and is now the only SWAPO councillor in Hardap Region. He obtained 1,829 votes. Bartholomeus Pieters of the Landless People's Movement (LPM, a new party registered in 2018) came second with 1,756 votes.
