= Theo Diergaardt =

Namibian politician (died 2020)

The Honourable Theo Diergaardt MP

Deputy Minister of Agriculture, Water and Forestry
- In office 19 March 2015 – 22 July 2020
- President: Hage Geingob
- Preceded by: Lempy Lucas

Deputy Minister of Lands and Resettlement
- In office January 2011 – 19 March 2015
- President: Hifikepunye Pohamba
- Succeeded by: Bernadus Swartbooi

Personal details
- Born: Rehoboth, Hardap Region
- Party: SWAPO
- Occupation: Politician
- Profession: Accountant

Vivian Theo Diergaardt (1969/1970 – 22 July 2020) was a Namibian politician and Member of Parliament. He was Deputy Minister of Lands and Resettlement from 2011 to 2015.

== Life and career ==
Diergaardt grew up in Rehoboth and attended school there at Dr Lemmer High School. He graduated from Peninsula Technikon with a Diploma in Cost and Management Accounting. Afterwards he obtained a Higher Diploma and a master's degree in the same discipline from Technicon SA, a distance university.

Diergaardt was a SWAPO politician. He was the Regional Councillor for the Rehoboth Urban West constituency and a member of the National Council of Namibia as a representative of Hardap Region, both from 2004 to 2015. In January 2011 he was appointed Deputy Minister of Lands and Resettlement, and in March 2015 he was appointed one of two Deputy Ministers of Agriculture, Water and Forestry.

Diergaardt died, aged 50, after a short illness in Windhoek on 22 July 2020.
