= Rehoboth Urban West =

Electoral constituency in Namibia

Coordinates: 23°19′00″S 17°04′54″E

Rehoboth Urban West constituency (red) in the Hardap Region

Rehoboth Urban West is an electoral constituency in the Hardap region of Namibia, comprising the suburbs of Rehoboth that are situated to the west of the national road B1, covering an area of 325 km^{2} (125 sq mi). It had a population of 11,197 in 2011, up from 9,238 in 2001. As of 2020 the constituency had 8,324 registered voters.

== Politics ==
Rehoboth was traditionally a stronghold of the South West Africa People's Organization (SWAPO) party. In the 2004 regional election, SWAPO candidate Theo Diergaardt received 1,261 of the 2,468 votes cast and became councillor.

The 2015 regional elections were won by Laurena Wilhelmina Christ of the United People's Movement (UPM) with 1,975 votes. No other constituency in Hardap Region was won by an opposition candidate. Diergaardt, the sitting councillor and then-deputy minister of Lands and Resettlement of the ruling SWAPO party came second with 1,479 votes, followed by Marthinus Christiaan Kotze of the Democratic Turnhalle Alliance (DTA, 159 votes).

The 2020 regional election were won by Harald Kambrude of the Landless People's Movement (LPM, a new party registered in 2018). He obtained 1,237 votes. Francis Huish of the Popular Democratic Movement (PDM, the new name of the DTA) came second with 766 votes, followed by Karl Manfred Draghoender (SWAPO, 706 votes). The sitting councillor Christ ran as an independent candidate in 2020 but only obtained 94 votes.
