= Heidmann =

Heidmann is a surname. Notable people with the surname include:

- Frederik Heidmann (1777–1850), Norwegian military officer, civil servant, and politician
- Johann Christian Friedrich Heidmann (1834–1913), German missionary and botanical collector

== See also ==
- Heilmann
