= John McNab =

Namibian politician (died 2020)

John McNab (1934/1935 - 3 October 2020) was a Namibian politician who served as Rehoboth Baster captain from 1999 until 2020.

== Life and death ==
John McNab was born around the Rehoboth area of South West Africa in 1934 or 1935. His grandfather was of Scottish descent, and was murdered in Waterberg in 1880.

In 1971, McNab co-founded the Rehoboth Baster Association (RBA), alongside Ben Africa and Piet Junius. McNab remained with the RBA before leaving in 1977 to establish the Rehoboth Democratic Movement. McNab was elected as Baster captain on 11 January 1999, with 40.8% of the vote, succeeding Hans Diergaardt.

McNab signed the Rehoboth Baster community into the membership of the Unrepresented Nations and Peoples Organization (UNPO) on 17 May 2008. In 2016, McNab was awarded the Afrikaans Language Board's Koker Award for his "continued struggle for the protection of Afrikaans in Namibia." In 2018, McNab delegated office duties to Martin Dentlinger due to ill-health.

On 3 October 2020, McNab died aged 82.
