= Jan van Wyk =

Namibian politician

Jan van Wyk MP

Member of the National Assembly of Namibia
- Incumbent
- Assumed office 20 March 2015

Personal details
- Born: Jan Johannes van Wyk; 17 October 1969 (age 56) Rehoboth, South West Africa
- Party: Popular Democratic Movement (2020–present); United People's Movement (2010–present)
- Occupation: Member of Parliament
- Profession: Politician
- Committees: Committee on Constitutional and Legal Affairs; Committee on Human Resources and Community Development; Committee on Public Accounts

Jan Johannes van Wyk (born 17 October 1969) is a Namibian politician who has served as a Member of the National Assembly of Namibia since 2015, first as a representative for the United People's Movement (UPM) and later for the Popular Democratic Movement (PDM) from 2020 onwards. He is the UPM's current vice-president and former national chairperson. Van Wyk represented the UPM on the Rehoboth Town Council from 2010 to 2015 and was the UPM's sole parliamentary representative before the party formed a pact with the PDM ahead of the 2019 general election.

== Early life and career ==
Van Wyk was born on 17 October 1969 in Rehoboth in South West Africa, now Namibia, and matriculated in 1988. He obtained multiple degrees from Cambridge Tutorial College and the De Montfort University. Prior to becoming active in politics, he worked as a human resources practitioner.

== Political career ==
Van Wyk joined the Rehoboth Democratic Movement, the original name for the United People's Movement (UPM), before the November 2010 local elections and was appointed the party's inaugural national chairperson. He was also elected to the Rehoboth Town Council as one of two UPM councillors. In November 2014, the UPM won a seat in the National Assembly. He filled that seat on 20 March 2015.

In August 2019, the UPM and Popular Democratic Movement (PDM) formed an electoral alliance to challenge the governing South West African Peoples Organisation (SWAPO) ahead of the November general election. The UPM and PDM would remain separate political parties, yet only field candidates under the PDM banner. Van Wyk, now vice-president of the UPM, openly endorsed the candidacy of PDM leader and presidential candidate McHenry Venaani. SWAPO retained their majority and Van Wyk was re-elected as the PDM's support surged. He took office for his second term on 20 March 2020.
