= Christoph Menke =

German philosopher and Germanist

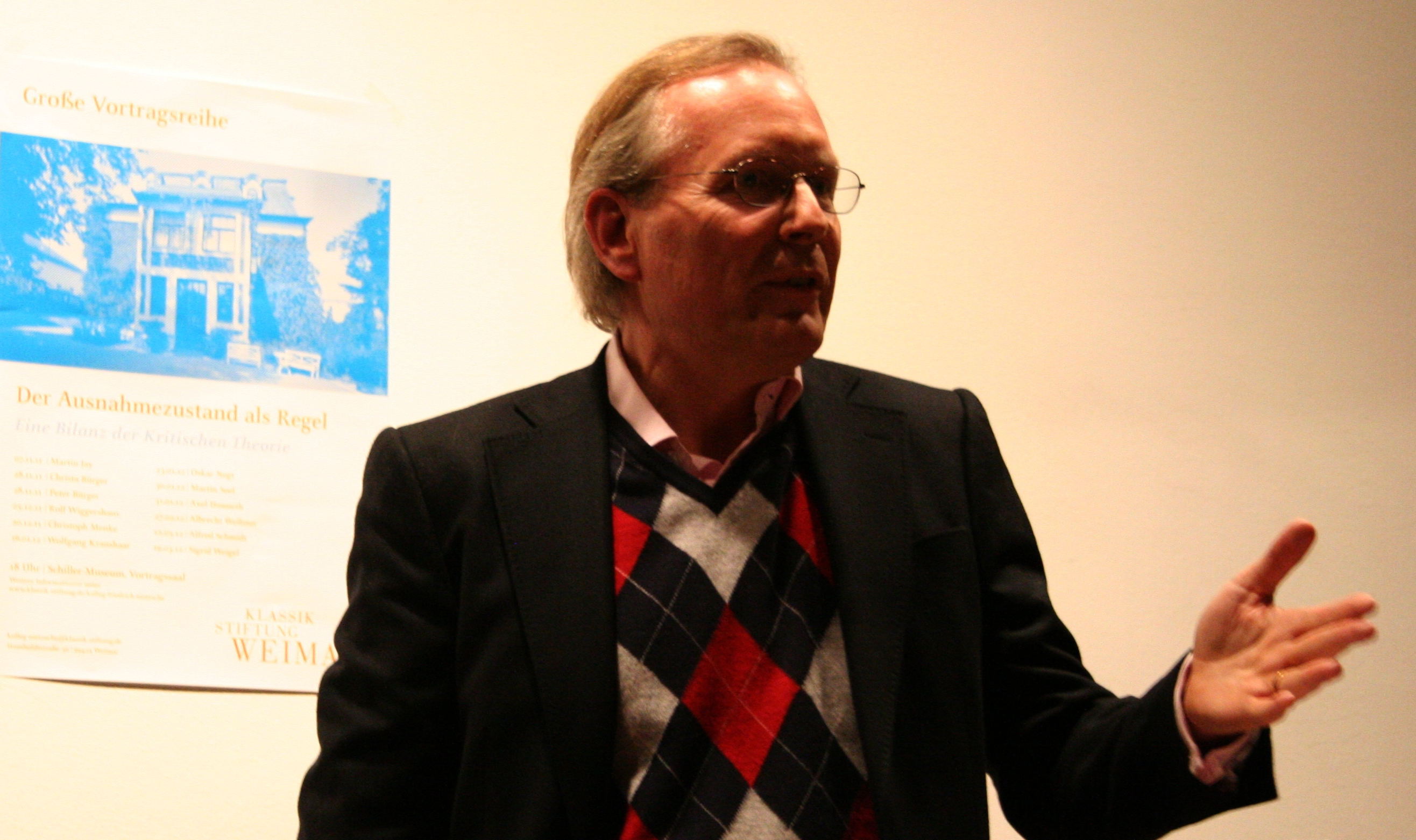
- Menke in 2011
- Born: 1958 (age 67–68); Cologne

Education
- Theses: Tragödie im Sittlichen. Hegel und die Freiheit der Moderne (1995); Nach der Hermeneutik. Zur Negativität ästhetischer Erfahrung (1987)

Philosophical work
- Era: 21st-century philosophy
- Region: Western philosophy
- School: Frankfurt School
- Institutions: Goethe University
- Website: https://www.uni-frankfurt.de/44527521/Menke_Christoph

Christoph Menke (born November 22, 1958, in Cologne) is a German philosopher and Germanist. He has been Professor of Philosophy in Frankfurt am Main since 2009. He is considered an important representative of the 'third generation' of the Frankfurt School.

== Life ==
Menke studied philosophy, German studies and art history in Heidelberg from 1977 to 1980 and German studies and philosophy under Albrecht Wellmer in Konstanz from 1980 to 1983. He received his doctorate there in 1987 with a dissertation on: Nach der Hermeneutik. Zur Negativität ästhetischer Erfahrung. He completed his habilitation in 1995 at the Free University of Berlin with the thesis Tragödie im Sittlichen. Hegel und die Freiheit der Moderne. From 1988 to 1991 Menke was an assistant professor in University of Konstanz, from 1991 to 1997 in Berlin, from 1997 to 1999 Associate Professor at The New School for Social Research, New York, then Professor of Philosophy with a focus on ethics and aesthetics at the University of Potsdam, and since the summer semester of 2009 a professor of practical philosophy (with a special focus on the philosophy of law and political philosophy) in the Exzellenzcluster Normative Orders at the Goethe University in Frankfurt am Main.

In addition, Menke held the following positions: from 1995 to 2004, co-applicant of the Research Training Group Repräsentation-Rhetorik-Wissen at the European University Viadrina in Frankfurt (Oder); from 2001, co-director of the Menschenrechtszentrums (Human Rights Center) at the University of Potsdam; from 2003, project leader in the SFB 626 Ästhetische Erfahrung im Zeichen der Entgrenzung der Künste (Aesthetic Experience in the Context of the Dissolution of Boundaries in the Arts); from 2005, spokesperson of the Research Training Group Lebensformen und Lebenswissen (Life-froms and Life-knowledge).

Menke was also a Heisenberg Fellow and held substitute and guest lectureships at the University of Potsdam, the Free University of Berlin, the National Autonomous University of Mexico in Mexico City, the New School for Social Research and Columbia University (both in New York) and was a Fellow at the Max Weber-Kolleg für sozial- und kulturwissenschaftliche Forschung at the University of Erfurt from 2003 to 2005. Menke is a member of the editorial boards of various journals (Constellations: An International Journal of Critical and Democratic Theory; Philosophy and Social Criticism; Revue d'Esthétique; Polar).

He is the brother of Bettine Menke, a literary scholar who teaches in University of Erfurt.

== Main research areas ==
Menke's work focuses on political and legal philosophy (democracy and equality; the history and concept of subjective rights; human rights), theories of subjectivity (abilities and action; mind and inner nature), ethics (success and failure; theories of tragedy) and aesthetics (aesthetics of modernity; tragedy and theater). Since the summer semester of 2009, Menke has been leading the research project Normativität und Freiheit (Normativity and Freedom) in the Exzellenzcluster Normative Orders, which aims to investigate how freedom as social normativity is founded and why freedom is always simultaneously freedom from social participation and thus from normativity. Against this background, particular attention is paid to the figure of subjective rights, which characterizes the form of government in modern societies.

== Selected publications ==
Monographs

- Die Souveränität der Kunst: Ästhetische Erfahrung nach Adorno und Derrida, Frankfurt/Main: Athenäum 1988; Überarbeitete Taschenbuchausgabe Frankfurt/Main: Suhrkamp 1991, 2. Aufl. 2000.
  - Französische Übersetzung: Paris: Armand Colin 1994.
  - Spanische Übersetzung: Madrid: Visor 1996 (La balsa de la Medusa, 85).
  - Englische Übersetzung: Cambridge, Mass.: MIT Press 1998 (Paperback 1999).
- Tragödie im Sittlichen. Gerechtigkeit und Freiheit nach Hegel, Frankfurt/Main: Suhrkamp 1996.
- Spiegelungen der Gleichheit, Berlin: Akademie 2000; Spiegelungen der Gleichheit. Politische Philosophie nach Adorno und Derrida, erweiterte Taschenbuchausgabe, Frankfurt am Main: Suhrkamp 2004.
  - Englische Übersetzung: Stanford: Stanford University Press 2006.
- Die Gegenwart der Tragödie. Versuch über Urteil und Spiel, Frankfurt am Main: Suhrkamp 2005.
  - Kroatische Übersetzung: Zagreb 2008.
  - Spanische Übersetzung: Madrid: Machado 2008 (La balsa de la Medusa, 165).
  - Englische Übersetzung: Tragic Play: Irony and Theater from Sophocles to Beckett, transl. James Phillips; New York: Columbia University Press 2009; Rezension von Joshua Billings, in: Bryn Mawr Classical Review 2009.10.63
- (mit Arnd Pollmann): Philosophie der Menschenrechte. Zur Einführung, Hamburg: Junius 2007.
- Kraft. Ein Grundbegriff ästhetischer Anthropologie, Frankfurt am Main: Suhrkamp 2008; Buchbesprechung von Michael Mayer, in: artnet, 22. Januar 2009
  - Spanische Übersetzung: Fuerza. Un concepto fundamental de la antropología estética, Granada: Comares, 2020.
- Die Kraft der Kunst, Berlin: Suhrkamp 2013.
- Kritik der Rechte, Berlin: Suhrkamp 2015, ISBN 978-3-518-58625-9.
- Am Tag der Krise. Kolumnen, Berlin: August Verlag 2018, ISBN 978-3-941360-62-4.
- Autonomie und Befreiung. Studien zu Hegel, Berlin: Suhrkamp 2018, ISBN 978-3-518-29866-4.
- (u. a.) "Law and Violence. Christoph Menke in Dialogue", Manchester: Manchester University Press, 2018, ISBN 978-1-5261-0508-0.
- Theorie der Befreiung, Berlin: Suhrkamp 2022, ISBN 978-3-518-58792-8.

Editorials

- (ed. with Martin Seel): Zur Verteidigung der Vernunft gegen ihre Liebhaber und Verächter, Frankfurt a. M.: Suhrkamp 1993
- (Hrsg.): Paul de Man, Die Ideologie des Ästhetischen, Frankfurt a. M.: Suhrkamp 1993
- (ed. with Andrea Kern): Philosophie der Dekonstruktion. Zum Verhältnis von Normativität und Praxis, Frankfurt a. M.: Suhrkamp 2002
- (ed. with Joachim Küpper): Dimensionen ästhetischer Erfahrung, Frankfurt a. M.: Suhrkamp 2003
- (ed. with Eckart Klein): Menschenrechte und Bioethik, Berlin: Berliner Wissenschaftsverlag 2004
- (ed. with Eva Horn, Bettine Menke): Literatur als Philosophie – Philosophie als Literatur, München: Fink 2005; Google Bücher
- (ed. with Bettine Menke): Tragödie. Trauerspiel. Spektakel. Theater der Zeit, Berlin 2007, ISBN 978-3-934344-85-3.
- (ed. with Juliane Rebentisch): Kreation und Depression. Freiheit im gegenwärtigen Kapitalismus, Kulturverlag Kadmos, Berlin 2011, ISBN 978-3-86599-126-3
