= Diergaardt v. Namibia =

J.G.A. Diergaardt (late Captain of the Rehoboth Baster Community) et al. v. Namibia (No. 760/1997) (2000) was a case decided by the United Nations Human Rights Committee.

== Complaints ==
Representatives of the Rehoboth Baster Community filed an official complaint over alleged violations of Articles 1 (right to self-determination), 14 (equality before the courts), 17 (privacy), 25 (right to participate in public life), 26 (ban of discrimination) and 27 (minority rights) under the International Covenant on Civil and Political Rights (ICCPR), in effect since 1976.

== Committee's views ==
The committee found that it has no competence over alleged violations of Article 1, and that no violations of Articles 14, 17, 25 and 27 were shown by the facts before it.

Concerning article 26, the committee did find violations, holding that

"the authors have shown that the State party has instructed civil servants not to reply to the authors' written or oral communications with the authorities in the Afrikaans language, even when they are perfectly capable of doing so. These instructions barring the use of Afrikaans do not relate merely to the issuing of public documents but even to telephone conversations. In the absence of any response from the State party the Committee must give due weight to the allegation of the authors that the circular in question is intentionally targeted against the possibility to use Afrikaans when dealing with public authorities. Consequently, the Committee finds that the authors, as Afrikaans speakers, are victims of a violation of article 26 of the Covenant" (Para. 10.10.).

Members Abdalfattah Amor, Nisuke Ando, P. N. Bhagwati, Lord Colville, Maxwell Yalden and Rajsoomer Lallah filed four dissenting opinions on Article 26; members Elizabeth Evatt, Eckart Klein, David Kretzmer, Cecilia Medina Quiroga and Martin Scheinin filed two concurring opinions on the same issue. Elizabeth Evatt and Cecilia Medina Quiroga filed a concurring opinion on Article 27.
