= Rehoboth, Harris County, Georgia =

Unincorporated community in Georgia, U.S.

Coordinates: 32°38′37.49″N 84°53′1.75″W

Rehoboth is an unincorporated community in Harris County, in the U.S. state of Georgia.

Named Rehobeth according to the USGS.

== History ==
The community was named after Rehoboth, a place mentioned in the Hebrew Bible. A variant name was "Mobley". Rehoboth was once an incorporated municipality; its municipal charter was repealed in 1995.
