= Oanob Dam =

Dam in Hardap, Namibia

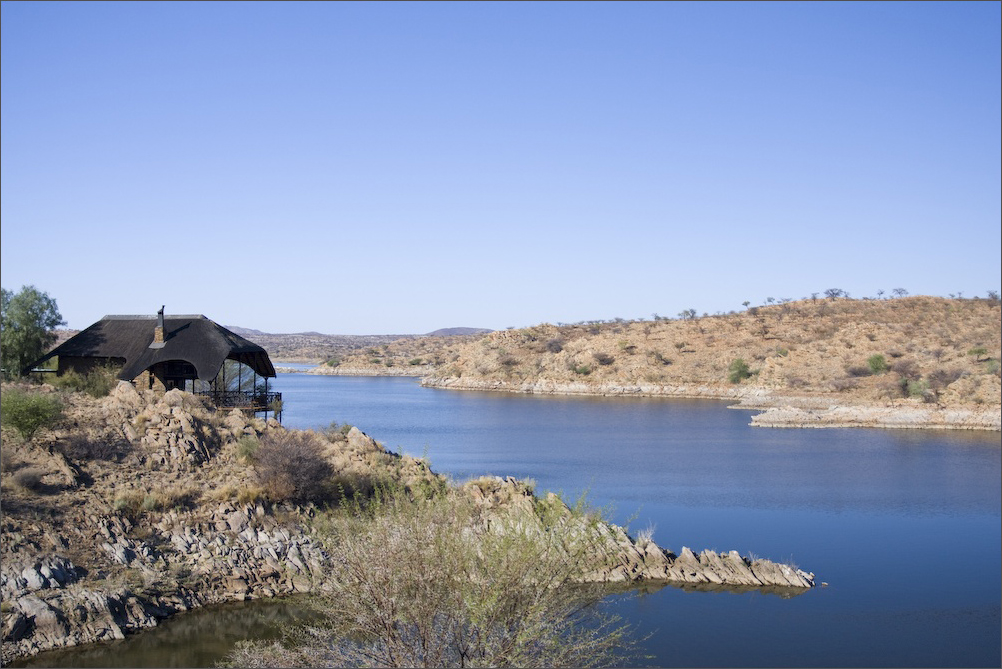
- Interactive map of Oanob Dam
- Country: Namibia
- Location: Rehoboth, Hardap Region
- Coordinates: 23°19′30″S 17°01′30″E
- Status: Operational
- Opening date: 1990

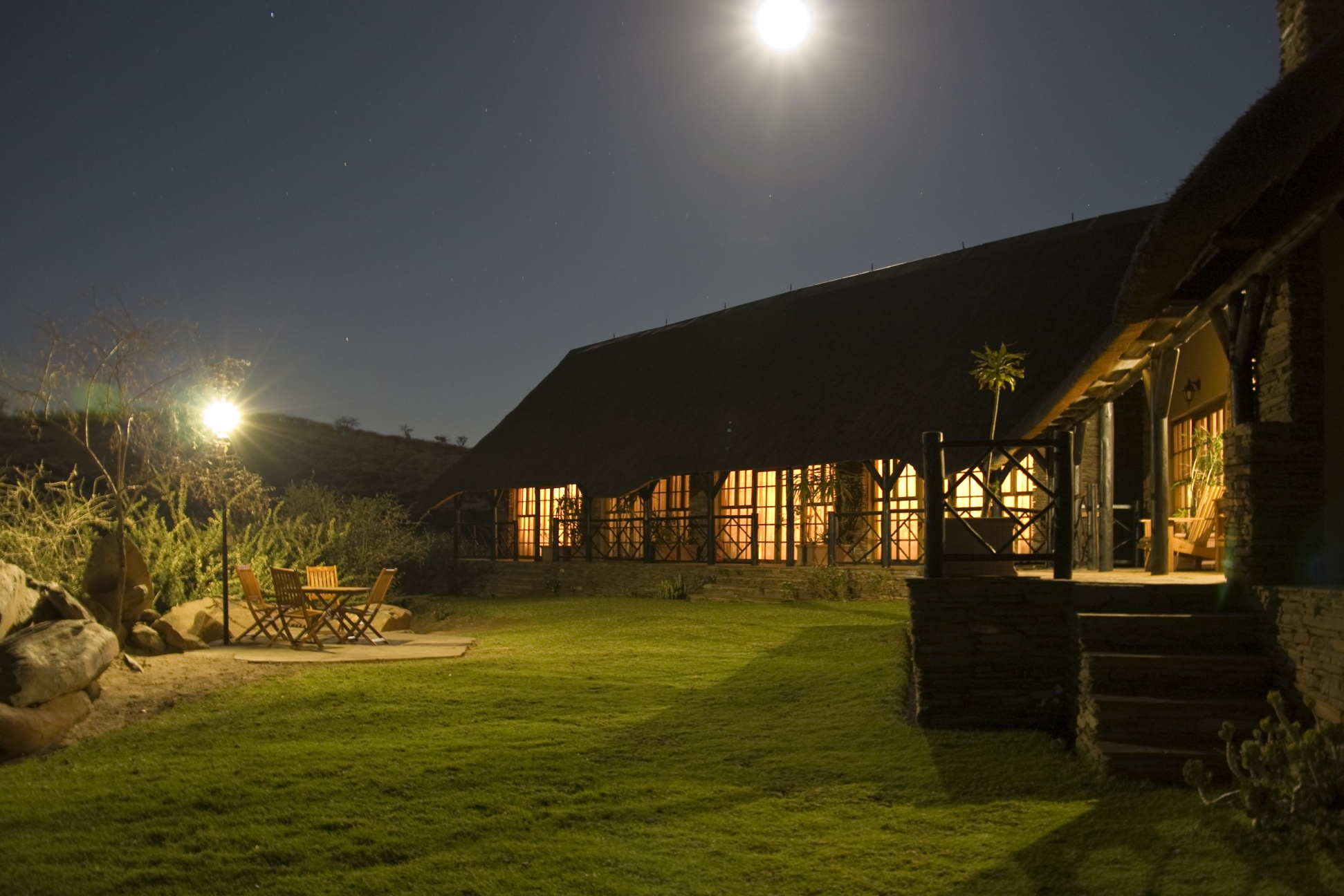
Lake Oanob resort

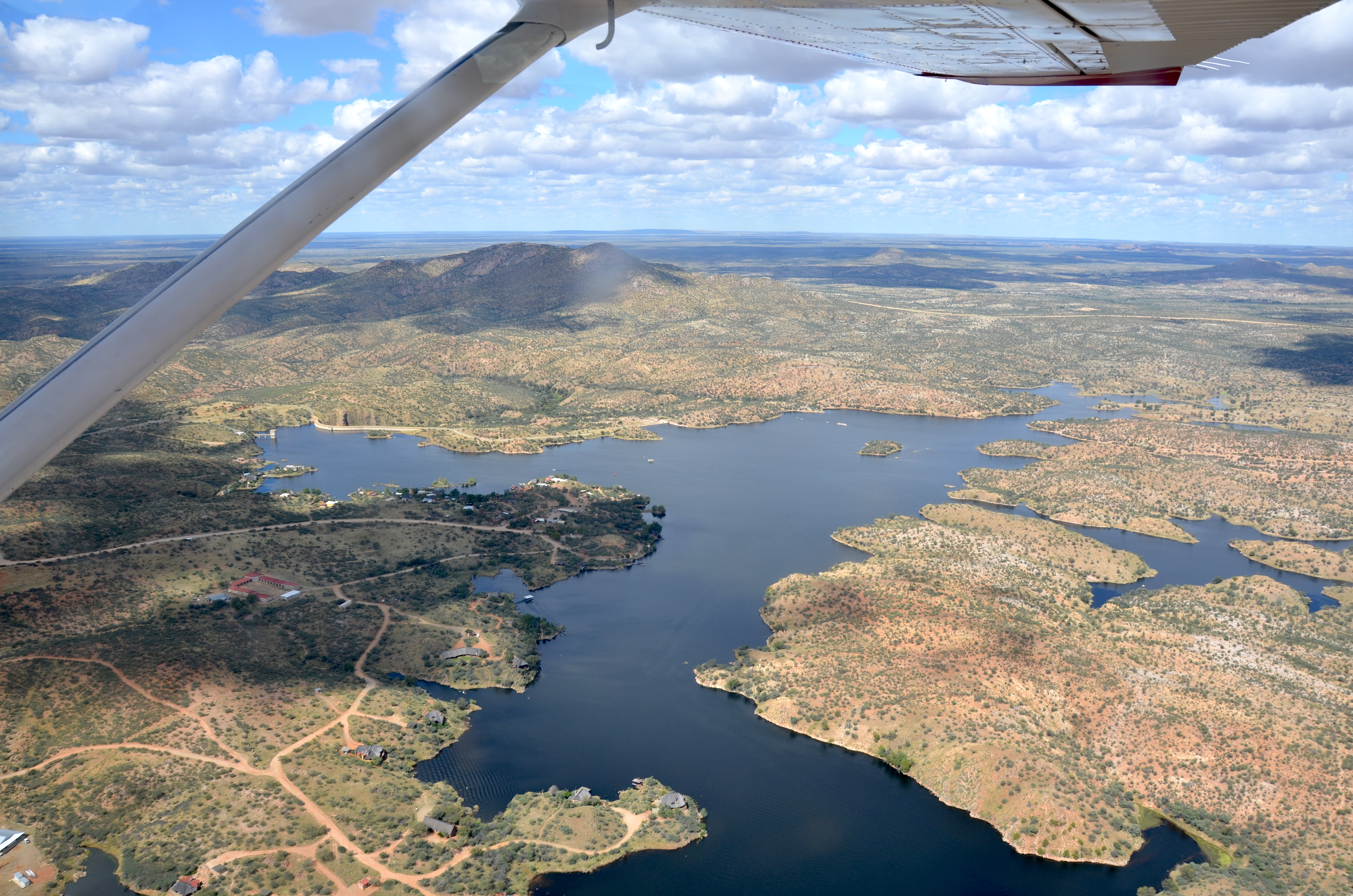
Aerial view of Lake Oanob (2017)

Oanob Dam is a dam outside Rehoboth, Hardap Region, Namibia. Located 7 kilometres (4.3 mi) outside Rehoboth, it dams the Oanob River and supplies the town with the majority of its water. It has a capacity of 34,505,000 cubic metres (1.2185×10^{9} cu ft) and was completed in 1990, the year of Namibia's independence.
