= Cornelius van Wyk =

Captain of the Rehoboth Baster until 1924

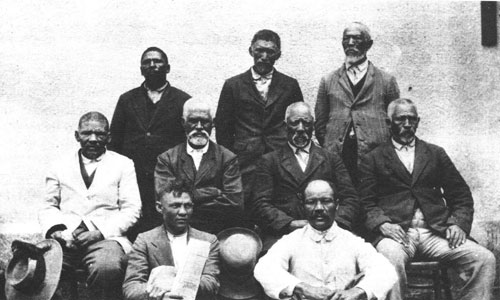
Rehoboth Baster Captain Cornelius van Wijk (middle row, second from left) and his council 1915

Cornelius van Wyk (died 24 April 1924) was the second Captain of the Rehoboth Baster, serving from 1914 until his death in 1924.

== Life and death ==
Van Wyk succeeded his father, Hermanus, upon his death in 1905. However, the German colonial government abolished the role of the Baster Captain, replaced instead by a Council of Basters (Basterrat).

In 1915, the Basters, whom had signed a protection agreement with the German Empire almost thirty years prior, rebelled against the military force in German South West Africa. Van Wyk had previously met with Union of South Africa Prime Minister Louis Botha, to seek conflict resolution, but to no avail. The rebellion finally ended after van Wyk's wife and children, among others, were killed in the Battle of Sam Khubis. As of 2013, the battlefield is in the process of being recognized as a national monument of Namibia.

Under Cornelius van Wyk, the de facto independence of the Rehoboth area as a homeland was approved by the Union of South Africa on 9 July 1915.

Van Wyk died on 24 April 1924, and was succeeded by Albert Mouton.
