= Eckart Klein =

German legal scholar

Eckhart Klein (born 6 April 1943) is a German legal scholar. From June 1994 to July 2008, he held the chair for constitutional, international, and European law at the University of Potsdam.

== Biography ==
Klein was born 6 April 1943 in Oppeln, Silesia (now southern Poland). After graduating from high school in Karlsruhe in 1962, and then completing military service, Klein studied law in Freiburg im Breisgau, Göttingen, Lausanne, and Heidelberg from 1964 to 1968.

In 1973, Klein received his doctorate from Heidelberg University. He habilitated in 1980 on 'status treaties in international law'. From 1974 to 1976, Klein was seconded to the Federal Constitutional Court as a research assistant and reported to the then President Ernst Benda.

Between 1981 and 1994, he held the chair for public law, international law, and European law at the University of Mainz. From 1994 to 2008, he was a professor of public law at the University of Potsdam, succeeded by Andreas Zimmermann.

From 1995 to 2002, Klein was a member of the United Nations Human Rights Committee in New York and Geneva. He has worked several times as an ad hoc judge at the ECtHR. Klein was a member presiding over Diergaardt v. Namibia in the United Nations Human Rights Committee, in a case determining the right to self-determination of the Rehoboth Baster community.

In 2011, Klein was awarded the Magdeburg Human Rights Medal by the Human Rights Office of the Otto von Guericke University Magdeburg.

In September 2019, he was one of around 100 constitutional law teachers who came out with the open call for the right to vote Reduce the Bundestag! to the German Bundestag.

Klein is married and has three grown children.
