= Democratic Action for Namas =

Political party in Namibia

Democratic Action for Namas was a political party in Namibia with ethnic affiliation to the Nama people. The chairman was Willem Oasib Boois. It was founded on 20 November 1984. It was one of the several smaller parties that merged to become the Federal Convention of Namibia in 1988.
