= Rehobeth =

Rehobeth may refer to a location in the United States:

- Rehobeth, Alabama
- Rehobeth, Maryland

== See also ==
- Rehoboth (disambiguation)
