= Vernon Cloete =

Namibian cricketer

Personal information
- Full name: Vernon Ricardo Cloete
- Born: 20 September 1985 (age 41); Rehoboth, Hardap, Namibia
- Nickname: verney
- Batting: Right-handed
- Bowling: Right-arm off break

Domestic team information
- Years: Team
- 2011/12–2014/15: Namibia

Career statistics
Competition	First-class	Twenty20
Matches	5	6
Runs scored	30	35
Batting average	3.33	8.75
100s/50s	–/–	–/–
Top score	25	28
Balls bowled	400	54
Wickets	5	5
Bowling average	61.00	17.40
5 wickets in innings	–	–
10 wickets in match	–	–
Best bowling	3/76	2/23
Catches/stumpings	4/–	–/–
- Source: Cricinfo, 6 February 2022

Vernon Ricardo Cloete (born 20 September 1985) is a Namibian former first-class cricketer.

== Career in sport ==
Cloete was born at Rehoboth in September 1985 and was educated at Windhoek High School. He made his debut in first-class cricket for Namibian against Griqualand West in the 2013–14 CSA 3-Day Cup, with Cloete making four first-class appearances in that edition of the competition and a fifth in the 2014–15 edition. In five first-class appearances, Cloete scored 30 runs with a highest score of 25. With his off break bowling he took 5 wickets at an average of 61.00, with best figures of 3 for 76. In November 2011, he played three Twenty20 matches against Kenya, before making a further three appearances in the 2013–14 CSA Provincial T20 Cup. In six Twenty20 appearances, he scored 35 runs with a highest score of 28. With the ball, he took 5 wickets at an average of 17.40; his best figures in this format were 2 for 23. He plays his club cricket in Namibia for Windhoek High School Old Boys Cricket Club.
