= Johann Christian Friedrich Heidmann =

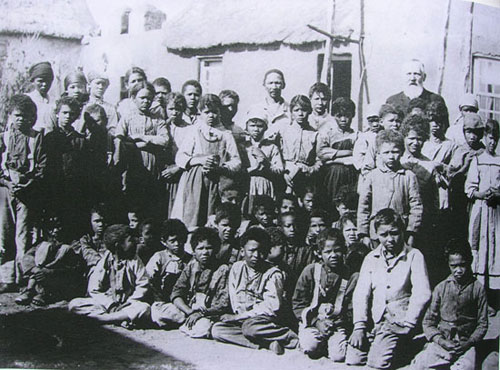
Heidmann's mission school at Rehoboth (1898)

Johann Christian Friedrich (Fritz) Heidmann (1 November 1834 – 30 June 1913) was a German missionary and botanical collector.

== Biography ==
He was born near Lübeck. Trained as a glazier, Heidmann joined the Rhenish Missionary Society in 1861. As a member of this group, he began work as a missionary in Cape Colony in 1865. A few years later, along with approximately 90 Baster families, he relocated to the deserted village of Rehoboth. At Rehoboth he would serve his congregation until his retirement in 1906.

During warfare between the Herero and the Nama, Heidmann acted as mediator at peace talks between the Basters and Ovaherero, and in the early 1890s he worked closely with German authorities to secure Baster cooperation against Nama leader Hendrik Witbooi (1825–1905).

In 1886, he was visited by Swiss botanist Hans Schinz (1858–1941), with whom Heidmann agreed to collect and ship botanical specimens from German Southwest Africa to Zürich; Schinz would later name the plant species Crotalaria heidmannii after him.

Heidmann suffered from dementia later in life, and died in a mental institution near Cape Town.

== Family ==
Heidmann married Ida Eick in 1869 and they were married until her death in 1899.
