= Rehoboth, DeKalb County, Georgia =

Unincorporated community in Georgia, U.S.

Coordinates: 33°49′27″N 84°15′53″W

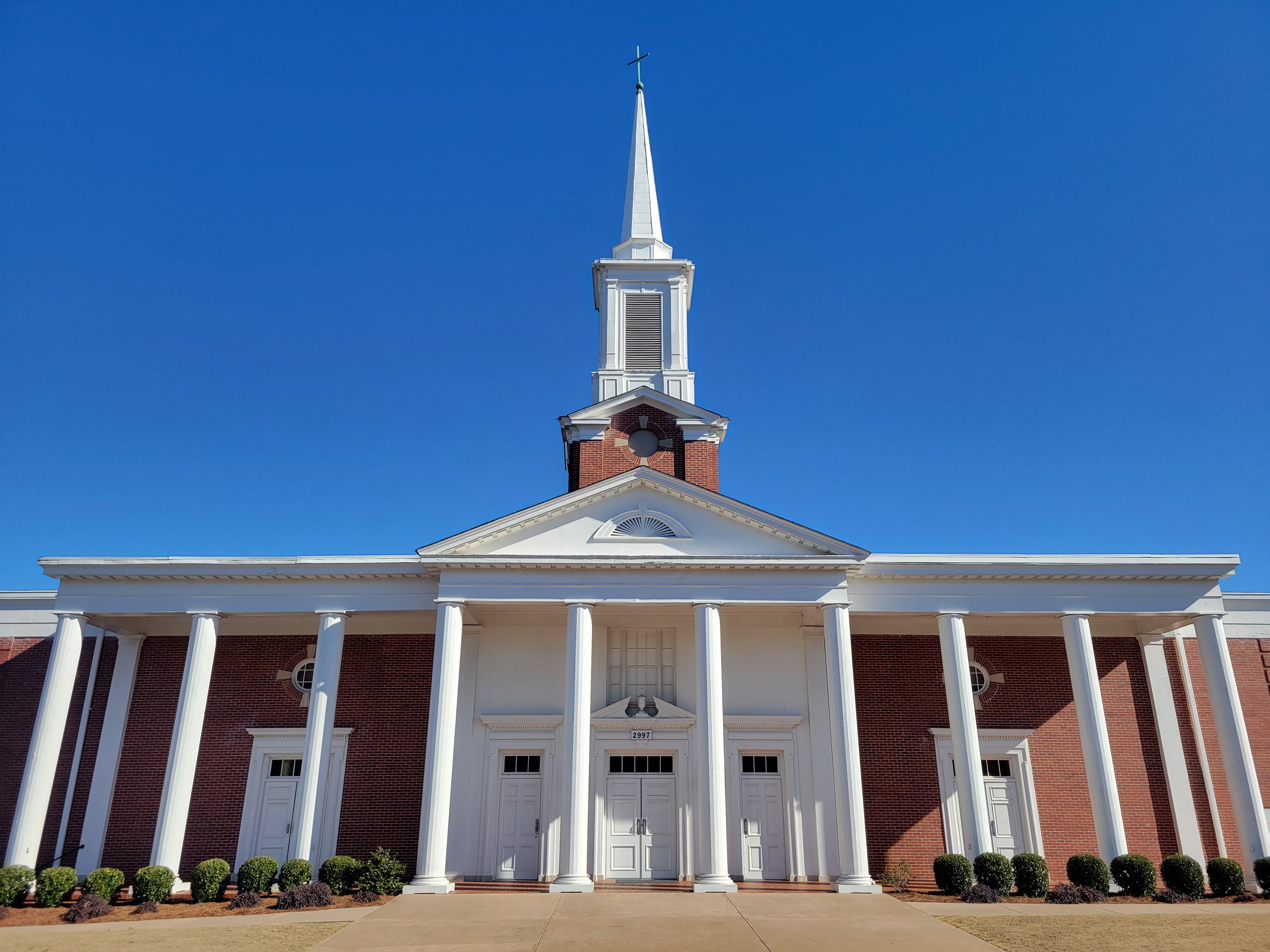
Rehoboth Baptist Church

Rehoboth is an unincorporated community in DeKalb County, in the U.S. state of Georgia.

== History ==
The community was named after Rehoboth, a place mentioned in the Hebrew Bible.
