= Hans Schinz =

Swiss botanist (1858–1941)

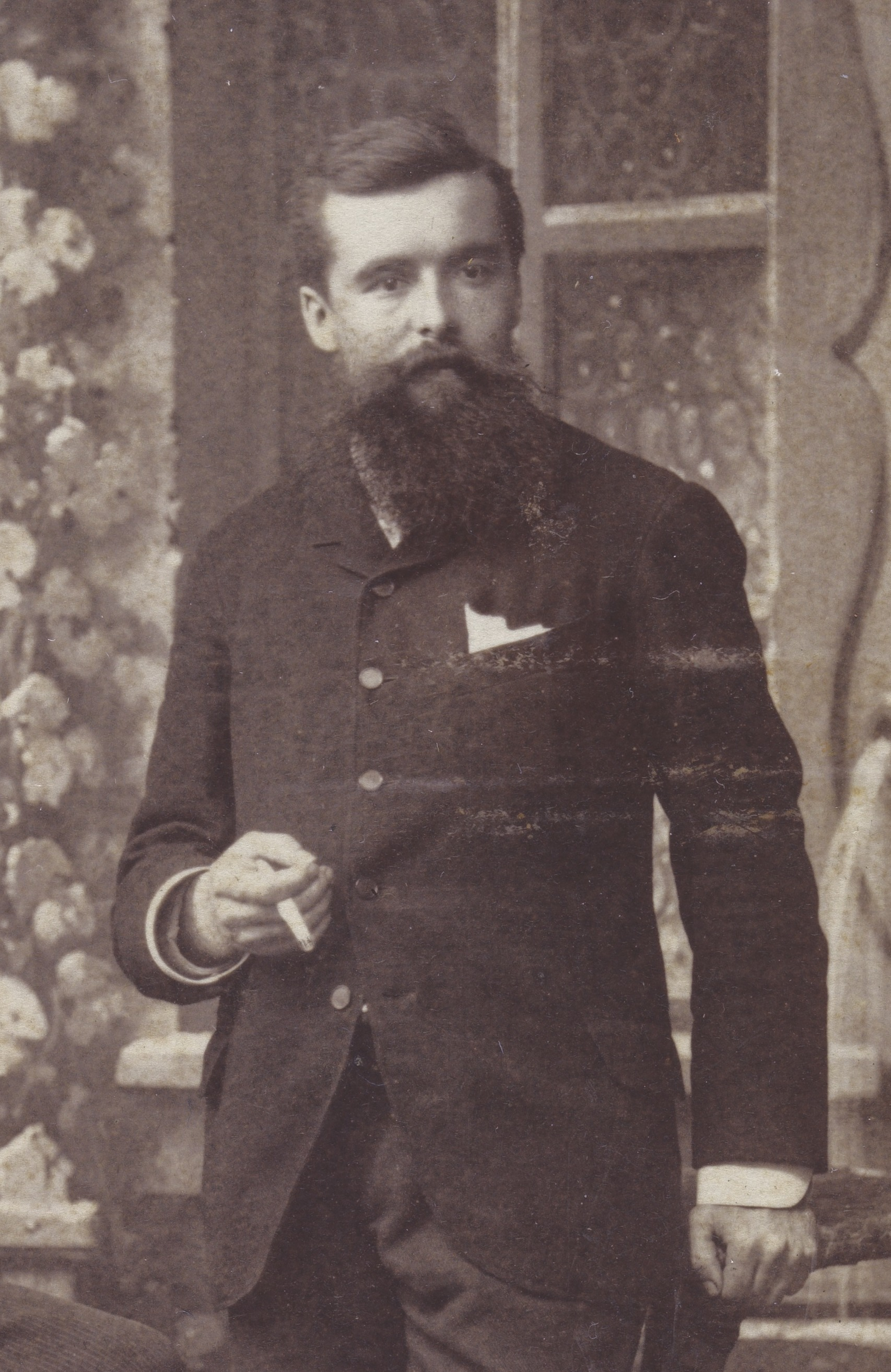
Hans Schinz, c. 1884

Hans Schinz (6 December 1858 – 30 October 1941), a native of Zürich, was a Swiss explorer and botanist. The standard author abbreviation Schinz is used to indicate this person as the author when citing a botanical name.

== Biography ==
In 1884, he participated in an exploratory expedition to German Southwest Africa that was organized by German merchant Adolf Lüderitz (1834–1886). For the next few years Schinz undertook extensive scientific studies of the northern parts of the colony. As a result of the expedition, he published Deutsch-Südwestafrika, Forschungsreisen durch die deutschen Schutzgebiete Groß- Nama- und Hereroland, nach dem Kunene, dem Ngamisee und Kalahari 1884-1887 (German South West Africa: Research Expedition of Herero and Nama Country, the Kunene Region, Lake Ngami and the Kalahari; 1884–1887). This work was an important scientific, geographic and ethnographic study of the colony, and was one of the first comprehensive works on the Ovamboland region. It was during this expedition that he made the acquaintance of the Finnish missionary Martti Rautanen (1845–1926) at Olukonda, and named the tree Ricinodendron rautanenii after him.

In 1889, he received his habilitation at University of Zurich, where in 1895 he became a professor and director of the botanical gardens. With Robert Keller (1854–1939), he was the author of Flora der Schweiz, a work on Swiss flora that was published over several editions from 1900 to 1923.

Several taxa have been named in his honour; In 1889, Swiss botanist Victor Fayod published Schinzinia, which is a fungal genus in the family Agaricaceae. Also in 1889, Melioschinzia (in the Meliaceae family), was published by K.Schum., this genus is now a synonym of Chisocheton. Schinzafra (in Bruniaceae family) was published by Kuntze in 1891, this genus is now a synonym of Thamnea. Then in 1895, botanist Ernst Friedrich Gilg published Schinziella, a monotypic genus of flowering plants from Africa, belonging to the family Gentianaceae. Lastly, from the Euphorbiaceae family, Schinziophyton was published in Kew Bull. 45: 157 (in 1990) by Hutch. ex Radcl.Sm.

== See also ==
- Johann Christian Friedrich Heidmann
