= Schinziella =

Scientific classification
- Kingdom: Plantae
- Clade: Tracheophytes
- Clade: Angiosperms
- Clade: Eudicots
- Clade: Asterids
- Order: Gentianales
- Family: Gentianaceae
- Genus: Schinziella; Gilg
- Species: S. tetragona

Binomial name
- Schinziella tetragona (Schinz) Gilg

Synonyms
- Canscora tetragona Schinz

Species of plants

Schinziella is a monotypic genus of flowering plants belonging to the family Gentianaceae. The only species is Schinziella tetragona.

Its native range is Tropical Africa. It is found in Angola, Burundi, Cameroon, the Central African Republic, Congo, Gabon, Guinea, Malawi, Mozambique, Tanzania, Zambia and Zaïre.

The genus name of Schinziella is in honour of Hans Schinz (1858–1941), a Swiss explorer and botanist who was a native of Zürich. The Latin specific epithet of tetragona is derived from tetragonal meaning square or having four corners. Both the genus and the species were first described and published in H.G.A.Engler & K.A.E.Prantl, Nat. Pflanzenfam. Vl.4 (Issue 2) on page 74 in 1895.
