= Rehovot-in-the-Negev =

Ancient city in the Negev, Israel

- רחובות בנגב (Hebrew) 'Rehovot ba-Negev' (Hebrew) 'Khirbet Ruheibeh' (Arabic)
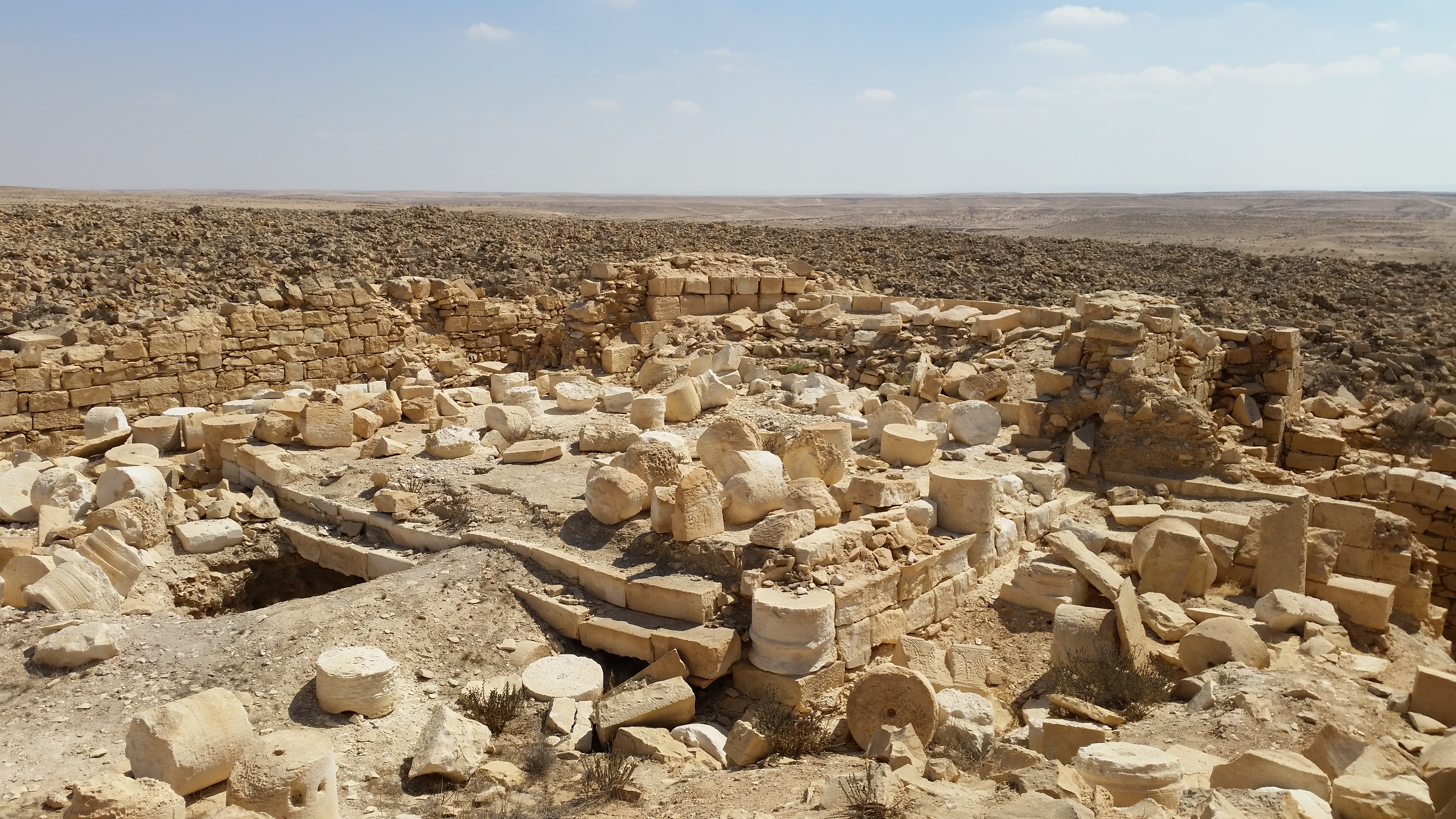
- Ruins at Rehovot-in-the-Negev

- Location within Israel
- 31.0317°N 34.5650°E
- Type: Settlement
- Cultures: Nabataean, Roman, Byzantine
- Location: Southern District, Israel
- Region: central Negev

History
- Built: 1st century
- Abandoned: 7th century

Site notes
- Archaeologists: Yoram Tsafrir
- Condition: In ruins
- Public access: Yes

Rehovot-in-the-Negev (English), from Rehovot ba-Negev (רחובות בנגב, modern Hebrew name), derived from Khirbet Ruheibeh (Arabic, 'Ruheibeh Ruins'), is an archaeological site in the Wadi er-Ruheibeh area of the central Negev in Israel, containing the remains of an ancient town. Apparently founded in the first century CE by the Nabateans, it was a thriving city by the fifth century during the Byzantine period, when it grew to more than 10,000 inhabitants, thanks to its being on the Arabian incense trade route.

By population, Rehovot-in-the-Negev was the second largest of the Byzantine-period "Negev towns".

The city was repeatedly hit by earthquakes, the major 7th-century seismic event which destroyed Avdat also leading to the abandonment of this city.

== Location ==
Rehovot-in-the-Negev was situated alongside a branch of the ancient Incense Road that connected the Negev with Sinai.

== Research history ==
In 1838, Edward Robinson visited the site, becoming the first modern Western scholar to do so. Archaeological excavations were conducted from 1975 to 1979, with a final season taking place in 1986. These digs were led by Yoram Tsafrir, in collaboration with the Hebrew University of Jerusalem and the Israel Exploration Society.

== Archaeology ==
The settlement spans around 120 dunams (approximately 30 acres), making it the second-largest Byzantine-period city in the Negev, after Elusa (Haluza). Contrary to earlier aerial views suggesting a regular Roman street grid, excavations revealed that the streets were irregular. The buildings were densely packed yet spacious, with roofs constructed from stone beams supported by arches.

Four churches have been identified at the site: central, northern, eastern, and southern. The central church is a single-apse basilica, with a marble-paved nave and chancel, and a preserved synthronon. It includes flanking rooms with arched ceilings. The church was constructed in two phases, the later one dating to the mid-6th century CE. It featured marble screen panels and an altar featuring evidence of a ciborium.

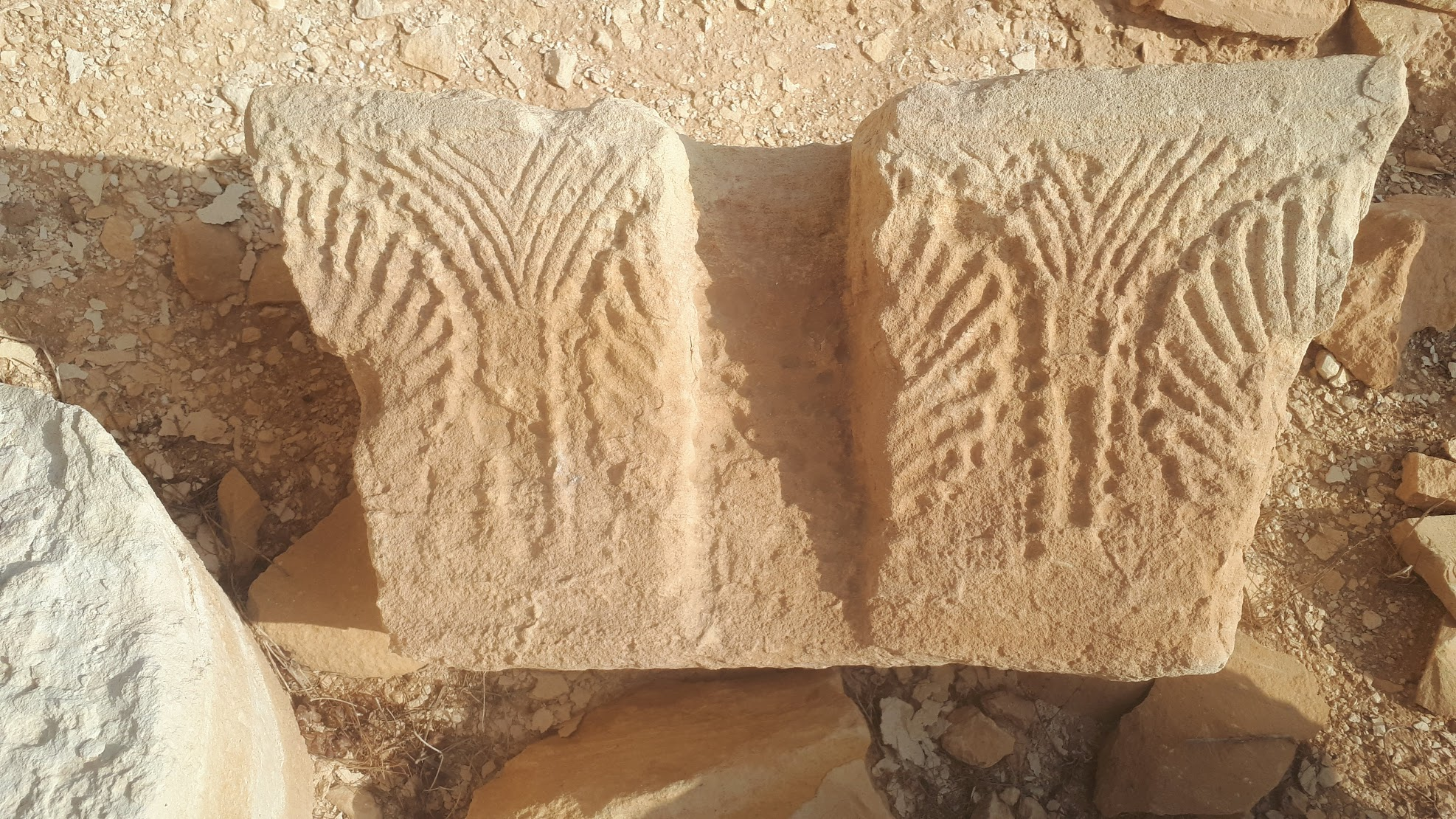
Carved stone fragment from the central church featuring a motif of palm branches

The North Church was located outside the main residential area and is a triapsidal basilica, likely part of a monastery complex. It featured a large crypt beneath the chancel, designed to facilitate uninterrupted processions, similar to pilgrimage churches in Bethlehem and Sinai. Greek inscriptions, including dedications and funerary texts, were discovered at the church, with some found in situ. The church was constructed in the 5th century CE, with burials continuing into the mid-6th century. The earliest funerary inscription is dated to 488 CE (based on its reference to the year 383 in the era of Provincia Arabia), and the latest is from 555 CE.

Other churches were located on the eastern and southern edges of the town.

== No biblical connection ==
Easton's Bible Dictionary, published in 1893–97, tentatively associated the well dug by Isaac in Gerar and called by him Rehoboth (see Genesis 26:22) with a site "in Wady er-Ruheibeh, some 20 miles south of Beersheba." Modern archaeology, however, dismisses the identification of Ruheibeh (Rehovot-in-the-Negev) with Isaac's Rehoboth, because the site contains no remains older than the Roman period.

== See also ==
- Rehoboth (disambiguation)

== Bibliography ==
- Patrich, Joseph; Tsafrir, Yoram (1993). "A Byzantine Church Complex at Horvat Beit Loya". In Tsafrir, Yoram (ed.). Ancient Churches Revealed. Jerusalem: Israel Exploration Society. pp. 265–272.
