= Ben Africa =

Namibian politician

- Born: 13 October 1938 (age 87); Rehoboth, South West Africa (present-day Namibia)
- Education: Athlone High School; University of Cape Town
- Political party: Democratic Turnhalle Alliance
- Other political affiliations: Rehoboth Baster Association
- Spouses: Marjory Judith; Ida Kroukamp
- Children: 3

Ben Africa (born 13 October 1938) is a Namibian politician, surgeon, and former Baster captain.

Africa served as the fourth Captain of the Baster and his tenure as vice-president of the Democratic Turnhalle Alliance.

== Life ==
Ben Africa was born in Rehoboth, South West Africa (present-day Namibia). He was educated at Athlone High School in Cape Town, South Africa. He studied medicine at the University of Cape Town Medical School in 1964. Africa narrowly avoided expulsion after publicly confronting on-campus racial discrimination. He became the first Resident District Surgeon of Rehoboth in 1966.

In 1971, alongside John McNab and Piet Junius, Africa established the Rehoboth Baster Association (RBA). The RBA was founded in opposition to the Rehoboth Volksparty to negotiate with the South West Africa government, to counteract the gastroenteritis epidemic in the "Baster Gebied".

Africa was elected as Captain of the Basters on 3 October 1977, winning by 2,307 votes. His closest competitor, Johannes Diergaardt, challenged the result, whom received 2,180 votes. Africa would remain as Baster captain until a successful court challenge by Diergaardt overturned the October 1977 vote, pronouncing Diergaardt as the fifth, and last, Baster captain.

In November 1977, the RBA joined the Democratic Turnhalle Alliance (DTA). Africa went on to become vice-president of the DTA on 3 July 1978.
