= Apartheid in Namibia =

Namibian system of racial segregation

Apartheid in Namibia was a system of institutionalised racial segregation that existed in South West Africa (now Namibia) from 1948 to 1990. Black Namibians were forced into barren ethnic labour reserves called "bantustans", which they could only leave to work in white areas until 1979. The black and coloured population of Namibia was disadvantaged in their education, in their access to health services, in their labor conditions, in their salaries and many more. Services were segregated by race until 1979.

== Background ==
After World War I, South Africa wished to annex German South West Africa (today Namibia). As a compromise, South Africa entrusted Namibia as a League of Nations mandate on behalf of the British Crown in 1920. While this mandateship was supposed to benefit Namibians, South Africa imposed apartheid policies in Namibia, when the National Party rose to power in 1948.

The old system of mandates was replaced by a Trusteeship Commission with the formation of the United Nations in May 1945. South Africa reasoned that the United Nations was not the League's successor and that it's mandate was lapsed, and thus did not recognize Namibia being placed under the Trusteeship Commission. South Africa's mandateship was officially revoked by the United Nations in 1966. South Africa however ignored this decision and continued administering the territory.

== Political power ==
South Africa established a constitution that gave administrative power to the white population in 1925. As late as 1977, only white Namibians could vote for the South African legislature and the Namibian legislative assembly.

== Petty apartheid ==
The Abolishment of Racial Discrimination (Urban Areas and Public Amenities) Act passed in 1979, opening urban residential areas to blacks and offering public amenities to all races. However taxes were still disproportionally used for services used by whites.

Trains had three classes; first class, reserved for whites, second class, for whites and blacks, and third class, for blacks.

== Separate development ==
Namibia under apartheid was split in two zones: the Police Zone in which blacks could not enter automatically and bantustans set side for each of the indigenous groups. These bantustans were created in 1968 by the Development of Self-Government for Native Nations in South West Africa Act, which put in effect the recommendations of the Odendaal Commission. (Note: It had been set up in 1962 and completed in 1964 to plan apartheid in Namibia.) This act reproduced the system already in place in South Africa since 1954. Other laws followed and created the framework for the bantustans. There were six homelands in Namibia by 1977: Damaraland, Hereroland, Kaokoland, Kavangoland, East Caprivi and Ovamboland. By 1986 there were four more: Bushmandland, Rehoboth, Tswanaland and Namaland.

Each of these homelands could have a legislative council which had jurisdiction over matters such as welfare, education, roads, water supplies and sanitation. They could also levy taxes and fees. Their decisions were subject to the assent of the president of South Africa and could be applied to all members of the nation over the Territory of Namibia with the approval of the president. As of 1977, Ovamboland, Kavangoland and Eastern Caprivi had a legislative council. Executive councils were also established at the same time as the legislative councils.

In 1973 an amending Act offered "self government" (nominal autonomy) to the bantustans. Bantustans were allowed to have a cabinet of ministers with a chief minister. There were however no project of leading them to independence, unlike in South Africa. By 1977, Ovamboland, Kavangoland and Eastern Caprivi had self-government. The act also officially restricted the powers of the legislative councils. Other homelands were given various forms of tribal authorities such as advisory boards or councils.

In 1980 the Proclamation AG8 created the "representative authorities" (or "ethnic administrations"), a second tier of government, for Namibia's official ethnic groups. For the sake of better international opinion, they represented ethnic groups wherever in appearance and not simply a geographical area; but in practice however the administrative centre of these groups remained in their homelands. They were composed of a legislative assembly and an executive committee. They controlled matters such as taxes, education, health, housing and social welfare, while important matters such as the military or foreign affairs were left in the hands of the South African-controlled central administration.

The bantustan system designated Africans as alien temporary residents to the police zone, to which they do not have an immediate right of access. It provided the South African government an excuse for the difference in rights of black and white Namibians: they could seek these lacking rights in their respective homelands. In addition, the existence of different governments for the black population promoted "divide and rule".

Africans could only be in the police zone if they were employed under the contract system until 1979. Urban Africans were not covered by the provisions for homelands, and were instead under the regime created by the Natives (Urbans Areas) Proclamation, which aimed to limit the influx of Africans in urban areas and regulate those who lived in them.

Africans with no regular job on a reserve could be forced to work on public work or public service in or outside the reserve.

=== Effects ===
The rapid economic expansion of the police zone was tied with the backward economy of the bantustans. The country's mineral resources and commercially active agricultural and fishing sectors were concentrated in the police zone. Far more land was available per capita for the white population than for the non-white population (2000 hectares against 50 hectares). Most of the homelands' agriculture was subsistence agriculture or involved livestock.

The movement of persons, goods and capital were restricted by governmental policies. Africans were forbidden from owning and acquiring land in the police zone.

== Life conditions ==
Black and Coloured people in Namibia lived in poverty in the homelands, sometimes to the point of being unable to earn subsistance. Thousands of migrant laborers left the bantustans in search of work. The situation only worsened starting in 1978 when Namibia was affected by a severe drought.

=== Health ===
Poor health was widespread for blacks. The mortality rate of black children was seven times higher than white children's. Malnutrition was common, especially for young children. Poor living conditions led to high rates of contractable diseases in young children, with black children being 40 times more likely of risking dying of meningitis, gastroenteritis or tuberculosis than white children. Tuberculosis was rampant, particularly amongst black workers. Mental problems related to stress were common amongst black adults. A high proportion of the black population was alcoholic, with some black areas having alcoholism rates of 50% to 80%.

Medical services offered to blacks were significantly poorer than those offered to whites. They were given at most around a fourth of the per capita spending on health services of white people. Blacks did not benefit from expensive medical technology like whites did. In the homelands the ratio of doctor to population was of 1:12,000 in 1980 compared to 1:7,670 for Zambia. There were almost no black doctors and no training facilities in Namibia.

== Education ==
The educational system in Namibia was one of the key factor in the maintenance of apartheid and one of its most visible aspects. The South African government reasoned that South Africa would need literate blacks for its industrial economy, but that their education had to be limited so that they remain subordinate. The number of blacks with a four-year primary education was to be increased, but they were to be severely restricted in their access to further education.

Education in apartheid Namibia could be seen as a continuation of South Africa's policy of "separate development". Schools were segregated by race on the territory of Namibia. (Note: With the exception of the Academy for Tertiary Education opened in 1980.) The homelands were responsible for education on their territory. The education of different races had different legislation, policies for the admission to and continuation of schools, syllabuses, and wage scales, career structure and qualifications for teachers. Black education received significantly less funding than white education.

Education was not compulsory or free for black Namibians, unlike for whites and coloureds. Dropout rates were high, and few Namibians studied in a level over lower primary school. As thus around a third of Namibians were functionally illiterate in 1981 and only a minority of blacks could become skilled workers or attain a management or administrative position.

Black staff's salaries was significantly lower than their white counterpart's in the 1960s and 1970s, but this gap was greatly reduced by the 1980s to ensure the cooperation of teachers with the regime (or at least, their silence). Too few teachers were trained for black schools, and they were trained poorly.

=== Coloureds' education ===
Coloureds' education differed than black's. Coloureds' education eventually became compulsory from 7 to 14 years old. It was provided for free. coloured education was split in three departments; one for Rehoboters, another for coloureds and one for Namas. By 1967, nearly all school-aged coloured children went to school despite education not being compulsory, but the dropout rates were high.

Coloured students received more funding per capita than black students in the 1970s and 1980s. This was to create division between the two groups and create semi-skilled and skilled workers for jobs where white workers lacked.

== Labour ==
Although there was no legal basis for such discrimination, there were "job reservations" in Namibia – meaning non-whites were barred from some jobs. This was required by white unions, and thus job reservations made its way into mining legislation and contracts. Some jobs were also informally known to be for whites only. Furthermore, lack of education and restrictions on their presence in urban areas meant Africans were generally relegated to the least attractive and least renumerated jobs. Non-whites were heavily concentrated in unskilled and semi-skilled works; in the fields of modern architecture, mining and domestic services.

Blacks had lower salaries than whites for the same work based on their skin color. Around 1976, the wage gap between whites and blacks was of 50% in the public sector and even greater in the private sector. Only 22% of the GDP in 1983 was left to the black population, despite them composing 94,5% of the population, whereas whites had 18% of the GDP and foreign companies 40%. Of the 22% of the GDP given to the black population, only a quarter was left to black peasants, who were the majority of the black population.

African workers were disadvantagely or not covered at all by the provisions of various laws related to workers' benefits, wages, safety and disability compensation, either by direct omission or because the jobs in which the majority of non-whites worked were excluded. Pensions increase for the aged, blinds and disabled were also lower for blacks and coloureds, and it was claimed that they were given in a 4:2:1 ratio (white:coloureds/asians:africans).

African workers also lived in low quality and overcrowded housing across the country. In the police zone, ten or fifteen workers would be crammed into a room, whereas in coloured compounds four workers lived together and white workers lived with their family in fully furnished houses. Some were even further overcrowded. Toilet facilities were also poorer than those offered to whites. This allowed employers to cut costs.

In the mid-1980s, the unemployment rate for blacks were high (around 20%), and many workers were only employed for seasonal short-term work.

=== Trade unions and right to strike ===
Blacks were restricted in their right to organize, to collectively bargain and settle trade disputes (trade union rights), to the detriment of their conditions of employment. Black trade unions could not be registered and thus were not afforded protection from being declared unlawful organisations. They would also not automatically become corporate bodies.

Professions where black workers were a majority (farm and domestic workers) could not form trade unions until 1978, when the Wages and Industrial Conciliation Act was amended. However trade unions could not be affiliated with political parties, probably in reaction to the National Union of Namibian Workers's affiliation with SWAPO.

Blacks did not have any protection in regards to negotiations of disputes with their employers, and could thus not be represented on conciliation boards unlike white Namibians. They were also effectively forbidden from organizing strikes. Blacks could be excluded from collective agreements, including wage-fixing within said agreements.

=== Contract system ===
The homelands were unproductive areas, and thus almost all African workers in Namibia were migrant workers under the contract system migrating to white areas to find work. Workers lived in poor conditions and were prohibited by criminal law to break the contract (until 1971/1972), to attempt avoiding work, to do it carelessly, to be obscene with his employer or to have a second place of employment. Africans could also be expelled from the police zone for various reasons such as begging or leaving their designated areas for something other than work.

Workers had to carry passes or exemption certificates at all times, as failure to show one to authorities once asked was a punishable offence. This ensured that black workers would only stay in white areas as long as their labour was needed.

Women were barred from the contract labour system.
