= Baster Council =

Legislature of Rehoboth in Namibia

The Baster Council (Afrikaans: Basterraad), is the parliament of the unrecognized state of the Rehoboth area in Namibia. It forms the legislature, or Volksraad, of Rehoboth together with the executive Captains Council (Kapteinsraad).

The Baster Council serves as the mouthpiece for the Rehoboth Baster people and is obliged to convey the wishes, needs, and recognition of the citizens to the Captains Council. Originally, only citizens who paid taxes were eligible to vote.
