= Rehoboth (homeland) =

Bantustan in South West Africa (1979–1989)

Coordinates: 23°18′57.36″S 17°4′50.96″E

Rehoboth Basterland
- 1979–1989
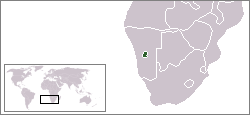
- Location of Rehoboth within South West Africa

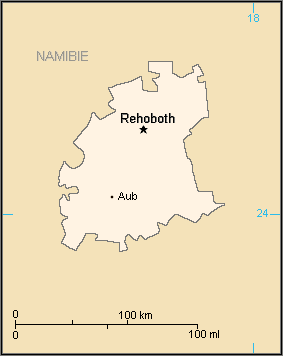
- Map of Rehoboth
- Status: Bantustan
- Capital: Rehoboth
- History
  - Established: 1979
  - Re-integrated into Namibia: May 1989
- Currency: South African rand
Preceded by	Succeeded by
South West Africa	Namibia

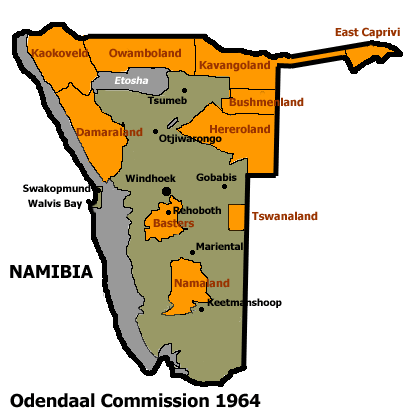
Allocation of land to Bantustans according to the Odendaal Plan. The homeland of Rehoboth, labelled here as "Basters", is in the centre of the territory.

Rehoboth (or Basterland) was a Bantustan in South West Africa (present-day Namibia) intended by the apartheid-era government to be a self-governing homeland for the Baster people in the area around the town of Rehoboth.

The Bantustan existed until 29 July 1989, a few months prior to the Independence of Namibia.

== Governance ==
The Rehoboth Self-government Act, 1976 established a Government of Rehoboth consisting of a Legislative Council with the ability to pass legislation known as "Acts" and a Kaptein's Council, led by an elected Kaptein. The office of Kaptein itself dates to the period of German colonial rule. The first election for Kaptein under the terms of the act was held on 3 October 1977 and won by Ben Africa. His opponent Johannes "Hans" Diergaardt challenged the outcome in court, leading to a new election on 31 October 1977. Diergaardt prevailed in this new election and became Kaptein in 1979. Although the Kaptein lost its powers with the dissolution of Rehoboth, he continued as Kaptein until his death in 1998.

== See also ==
- Apartheid
