= Hermanus van Wyk =

19th century leader of the Baster ethnic group of modern Namibia

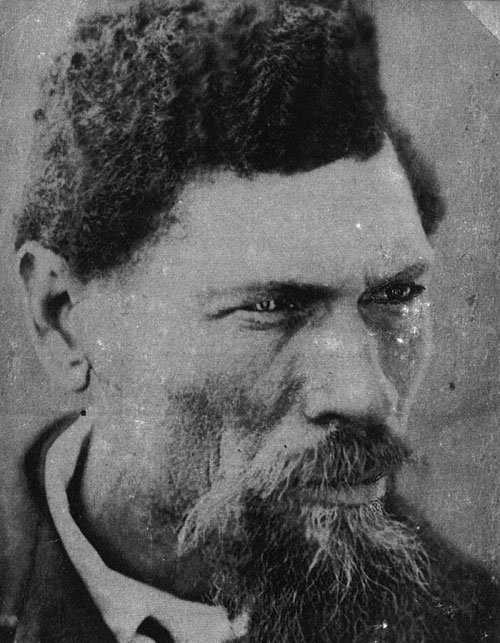
Hermanus van Wyk

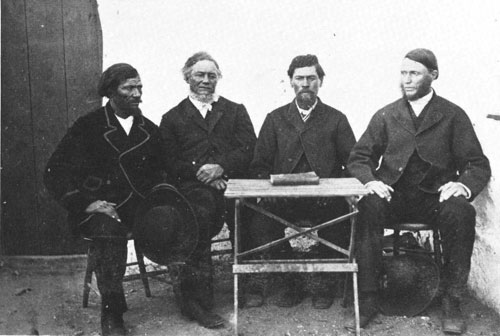
The first council of the Basters, 1872, presenting the community's Vaderlike Wette (constitution, the book on the table). Hermanus van Wyk is the third from left.

Hermanus van Wyk (1835–1905) was the first Kaptein of the Baster community at Rehoboth in German South West Africa. Under his leadership, the mixed-race Basters moved from the Western Cape to escape racial discrimination from the white population, and migrated into the interior of what is now central Namibia; the first 30 families settled about 1870. They acquired land from local natives and were joined by additional Baster families over the following years. The Baster people developed their own constitution, called the Paternal Laws (Afrikaans: Vaderlike Wette). They relied on the herding of sheep, goats and cattle as the basis of their economy.

Outnumbered by the native Damara, Nama and Herero peoples, the Basters engaged in periodic conflict with them in the late 1870s and 1880s, when the latter two groups were also in conflict with each other. The Basters suffered losses of valuable livestock. After the German Empire annexed South West Africa as a colony, van Wyk negotiated a kind of autonomy for Rehoboth and the land around it through a protection treaty with the Germans in 1885. In the early 1900s, the Basters sided with the Germans in a colonial war against the Nama and Herero. He died in Rehoboth in 1905 and his son Cornelius van Wyk was later elected the second Kaptein of the Baster community.

== Trek to South-West Africa ==
Van Wyk was born in 1835 to a mixed-race Baster family in the Fraserburg district in the Cape Colony, today South Africa. His mixed-race clan was living at De Tuin in the Northern Cape until 1868 when they decided to leave the Cape Colony because of the discrimination and harassment they faced from white people. Van Wyk was already the clan's leader at that time. They trekked via Pella, then crossed the Orange River, and arrived at Berseba in 1870. Scouts of the Baster clan discovered the fertile area around Rehoboth, which at that time had largely been abandoned by the Nama after they had been attacked by the Oorlam Afrikaners in 1864.

== Development of Rehoboth ==
In 1870, Abraham Swartbooi of the Nama allowed the Basters to settle at Rehoboth for an initial payment of eight horses and an annual rent of one horse. They arrived at Rehoboth in October that year. They worked to repair and develop the existing infrastructure. Under van Wyk's leadership of the Kaptein's council, the Basters drafted the Paternal Laws (Afrikaans: Vaderlike Wette), a constitution. By 1876, their community consisted of 800 people; they owned 20,000 sheep and between 2,000 and 3,000 cattle.

Due to the relative wealth that the community had accumulated, van Wyk attempted to buy the land around Rehoboth from Swartbooi. An option on the land was granted at a price of £2,750, but Swartbooi would not sell the land just yet. When the Herero-Nama War of 1880 began, the Basters joined sides with Jan Jonker Afrikaner and the Nama under Swartbooi against the Herero. A Baster merchant group was killed by the Herero. In 1882, however, the Basters were attacked by their Nama allies. They defeated the attack but lost substantial numbers of livestock stolen in the attack and other raids. A small war memorial was erected along Church Street in Rehoboth to commemorate the event.

== Protection treaty ==
The Nama sold the land around Rehoboth to an agent for the Dorsland Trekkers but, before the Boers could settle there, the German Empire claimed German South West Africa as a colony. On 15 September 1885, van Wyk and the Germans signed a "Treaty of Protection and Friendship"; this permitted the Basters to retain a degree of autonomy in exchange for accepting German colonial rule. The treaty recognized that the territory occupied by the Basters was theirs. In the Herero and Nama War of 1904–1908, the Basters sided with the Germans against the native peoples, however, few Basters fought in the conflict.

Hermanus van Wyk died in Rehoboth in 1905. The German colonial authorities did not approve a successor and instead established the Basterrat (English: Council of Basters). After the outbreak of World War I, the United Kingdom took over the area as a British Protectorate in 1914, administered by South Africa beginning in 1915. Cornelius van Wyk was elected in 1914 to succeed Hermanus van Wyk.
