= Rehoboth (Bible) =

Biblical place name

Rehoboth (Hebrew: רְחוֹבוֹת, romanized: Rəḥōḇōṯ, lit. 'broad places') is the name of three biblical places.

== Rehoboth-Ir ==
Rehoboth-Ir was a biblical town named in Genesis 10:11 as among those founded by Nimrod. Its exact geographic location is unknown. Rehoboth-Ir may possibly have been in the vicinity of the town of Nineveh. However, its name is identical to the Hebrew phrase "rehovot ir", meaning "streets of the town" or "public square of the town", which may refer to Nineveh itself, rather than the name of a distinct town.

== Rehoboth (well) ==
Rehoboth was the name given to the third well dug by Isaac in the Valley of Gerar, and the first over which his herdsmen and those of Gerar did not quarrel. According to Easton's Bible Dictionary (1893–97), the well was thought to have been "in Wady er-Ruheibeh, about 32 km (20 miles) south of Beersheba". Isaac gave it the name Rehoboth, which means "open spaces", rejoicing that "now the LORD has given us room, and we will flourish in the land". R. N. Whybray suggests that this name and the names of Isaac's other wells (Ezek and Sitnah) probably reflected "ancient local traditions".

== Rehoboth by the river ==
Rehoboth by the river was an ancient city from which came the Edomite king Saul in Genesis 36:37 and 1 Chronicles 1:48. Since "the River" in the Bible generally is used to mean the Euphrates, scholars have suggested either of two sites near the junction of the Khabur River and the Euphrates. However, this would be a place far outside the Edomite territory. The river mentioned could be a river in Edom such as the Zered (now the Wadi al-Hasa) in Jordan. Rehoboth could be identical with a site southeast of the Dead Sea.

== See also ==
- Nimrud#Archaeology
- Rehovot, a modern Israeli city close to Tel Aviv, named after Genesis 26:22
- Rehovot-in-the-Negev, a Nabatean and Byzantine town in Wadi er-Ruheibeh area (see above for Isaac's well), Negev desert
