= Hans Diergaardt =

Namibian chief (1927–1998)

Johannes Gerard Adolph Diergaardt, more commonly known as Hans Diergaardt (16 September 1927 – 13 February 1998) was a Namibian politician active for nearly a decade after Namibia gained independence. Prior to that, he was elected as the fifth Kaptein of the then-autonomous Baster community at Rehoboth, succeeding Dr. Ben Africa in 1979 after winning a court challenge to the disputed election of 1976.

Both before and after independence, Diergaardt founded several local political parties, among them the Federal Convention of Namibia. He represented this party as a member of the Constituent Assembly of Namibia, convened to draft the constitution for the new nation of Namibia.

Diergaardt is known for his criticism of black-majority rule in the early years of independent Namibia. Believing that minority group rights were not sufficiently protected, he led a legal suit to establish autonomy for Rehoboth Gebied, the historic district of Baster settlement, which had a kind of autonomy under German colonial and South African rule. The nation's Supreme Court ruled that Rehoboth had no special status in the newly independent Namibia. Before his death, Diergaardt filed an official complaint in 1998 with the United Nations Human Rights Committee, which ruled in 2000. It declined to rule on one issue, but concluded that Namibia was exercising linguistic discrimination against the Afrikaans-speaking Basters.

== Early life and political activities ==
Diergaardt was born into a Baster family in Rehoboth, then part of South-West Africa, on 16 September 1927. He became a professional car mechanic but also worked as a farmer, businessman, and politician throughout his life.

In 1947 Diergaardt started his political career by joining the Rehoboth Burgervereniging (English: Rehoboth Citizen Association). He later founded the Rehoboth Tax Payers Association (1959), the Rehoboth Volksparty (English: Rehoboth Peoples' Party, 1968), and the Rehoboth Liberation Party (1975). This was during the period following World War I when South Africa administered the territory, although the United Nations General Assembly had retracted its mandate in 1966. After that, SWAPO initiated an independence movement in 1966, conducting a guerrilla war against South Africa.

Diergaardt was elected as a member of the Rehoboth Advisory Council in 1959. After SWAPO began organizing an independence movement, Diergaardt served as Chairman of the National Convention in 1969. He participated in talks at the Turnhalle Conference (1975–1977) in opposition to Kaptein Ben Africa, who officially led the Baster delegation at the conference.

== Ascension to Kaptein ==
In 1976 South Africa granted the Basters a form of autonomy for the area around Rehoboth under the Self-Government Act, No. 56, in an effort to hold their loyalty. As part of its implementation of a Baster Homeland, South Africa supported an election for the Kaptein (Tribal chief) of Rehoboth. Incumbent Dr. Ben Africa won narrowly, and Diergaardt came second. Diergaardt challenged the election results in court; when he won in 1979, he was confirmed as the fifth Baster Kaptein in history.

He served as leader of the Baster Homeland (or bantustan) from 1979 until independence in 1990. Believing that building alliances with native tribes was important, Diergaardt promoted new housing for the Nama people and was the first local authority in Namibia to desegregate the school system. He also tried to build alliances at the national level to enable the Basters to have a voice in their future, but the major effort there was on ridding the country of South African control.

Diergaardt represented the Rehoboth Free Democratic Party (RFP) and had a seat in the Transitional Government of National Unity (TGNU). This was directly linked to the South African apartheid state, which allowed it to operate some governmental powers from June 1985 to February 1989. Diergaardt was the second chairman of the TGNU.

Prior to Namibian gaining independence, Diergaardt was elected to the Constituent Assembly of Namibia, which wrote the country's constitution. After independence, in 1990 Diergaardt threatened armed secession from Namibia if the government tried to redistribute the land of Rehoboth (as had been discussed prior to independence.) He believed that minority group rights were not sufficiently protected under the Namibian Constitution. He mounted a court challenge seeking to establish autonomy for the Basters based on their prior history in the country; the Supreme Court ruled they had no special status.

Before his death, Diergaardt filed an official complaint on behalf of the Basters with the United Nations Human Rights Committee. In Diergaardt v. Namibia (2000), the committee found evidence of linguistic discrimination against the Basters by the Namibian government, which refused to use the Afrikaans language in dealing with this community.

Diergaardt died from a heart attack in Rehoboth on 13 February 1998.

== See also ==
- Diergaardt v. Namibia (2000)
