= United People's Movement (Namibia) =

Political party in Namibia

The United People's Movement, formerly known as the Rehoboth Democratic Movement, is a political party (self-described "unity movement") based in Rehoboth, Namibia. It was formed in March 2010 and is headed by Willem Bismark van Wyk (President) and former leading Democratic Turnhalle Alliance member Piet Junius (Vice President). The party changed its name in August 2010 to the United People's Movement. The party officially registered with the Electoral Commission in July 2010 and contested the November 2010 local and regional elections, where it won 2 seats in the Rehoboth local council and 1 seat on the Okahandja Municipality.

The UPM is currently represented on the Rehoboth Local Authority Council by its secretary-general Martin G. Dentlinger and Chairperson Jan J. van Wyk. The UPM also has a seat on the Okahandja municipality, where it is represented by Mr. Andries Bezuidenhout.

Despite the financial difficulties and other challenges, the UPM gained one seat in parliament in the 2014 Namibian general election after gaining 6,353 votes (0.71%). National chairperson Jan van Wyk, who had served the party for four years in the Rehoboth Town Council, represented the UPM in Parliament. The party did not contest the subsequent elections in 2019.

The party contested in the 2024 Namibian General election but was unable to win a seat in the Parliament of Namibia as it only received 2,143 votes (0.20%) of the national vote.
