= Basters =

Southern African ethnic group

- Flag of the Rehoboth Basters

Total population
- 45,629 (2023 Census)

Regions with significant populations
- Namibia

Languages
- Afrikaans

Religion
- Protestantism

Related ethnic groups
- Afrikaners, Coloureds, Nama (Oorlam), Griqua

The Basters (also known as Baasters, Rehobothers, or Rehoboth Basters) are a Southern African ethnic group descended from Nama people of Khoekhoe origin and Europeans. Since the second half of the 19th century, the Rehoboth Baster community has been concentrated in central Namibia, in and around the town of Rehoboth. Basters are closely related to Afrikaners, Cape Coloureds, and Griquas of South Africa and Namibia, with whom they share a largely Afrikaner-influenced culture and Afrikaans language. Other groups of similar mixed ethnic origin, living chiefly in the Northern Cape, also refer to themselves as Basters.

The name Baster is derived from "bastaard", the Dutch word for "bastard" or "mongrel". While some people consider this term demeaning, the Basters reappropriated it as an ethnonym, in spite of the negative connotation. Their 7th Kaptein is Jacky Britz, elected in 2021; he has no official status under the Namibian constitution. The Chief's Council of Rehoboth was replaced with a local town council under the new government.

In the 2023 Census, 45,629 Namibians identified as Basters. Survival of the Baster culture and identity have been called into question in modern Namibia. Modern Namibia's politics and public life are largely dominated by the ethnic Ovambo and their culture. Baster politicians and activists have called Ovambo policies oppressive towards their community.

== History ==
=== Origins ===
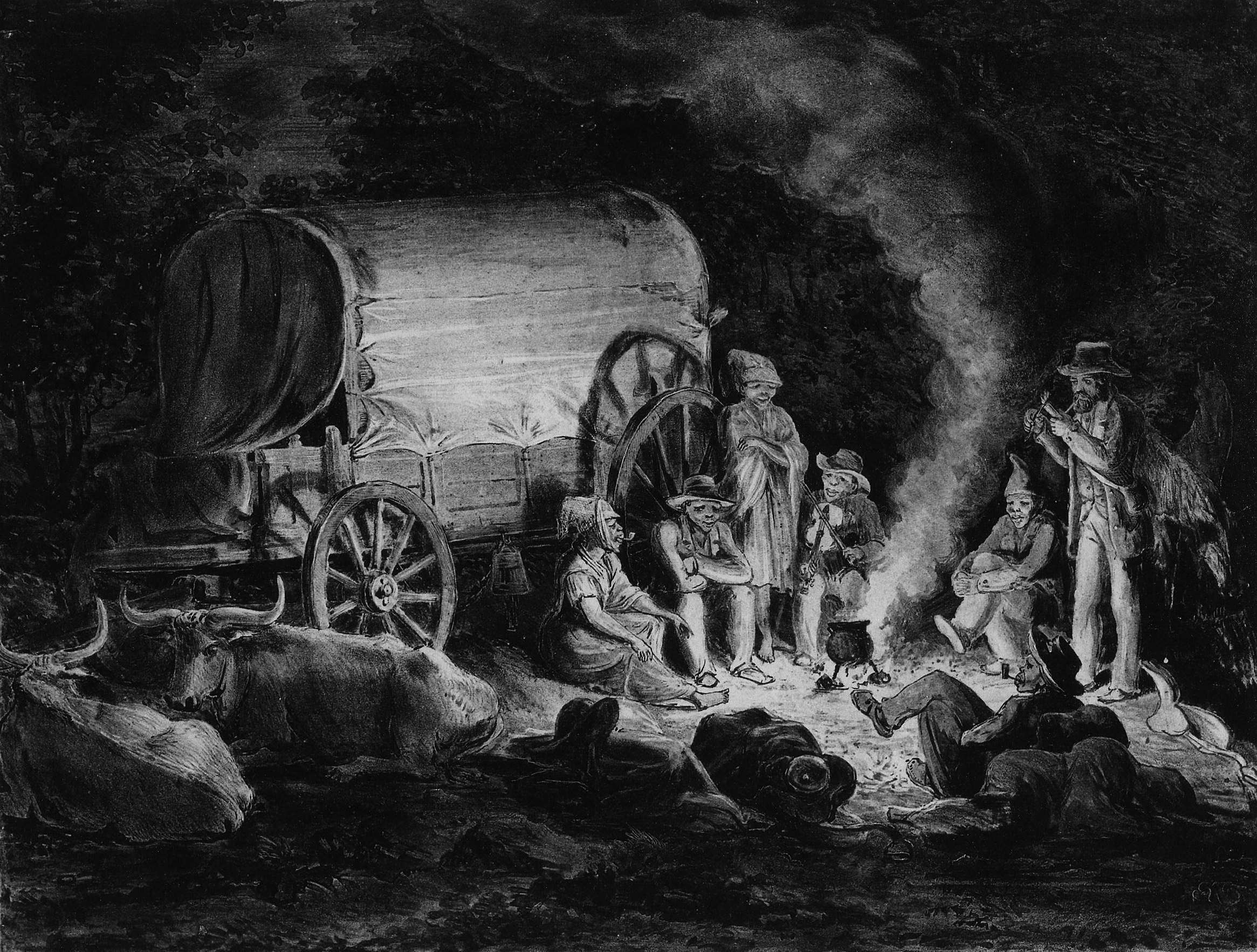
Illustration of mixed-race "Afrikaner" Trekboer nomads in the Cape Colony, ancestral to the Baster people

Basters were mainly persons of mixed-race descent. This term came to refer to an economic and cultural group, and it included the most economically advanced non-white population at the Cape, who had higher status than other natives. Some of the Basters acted as supervisors of other servants and were the confidential employees of their white masters. Sometimes, these were treated almost as members of the white family. Many were descended from white men, if not directly from men in the families for whom they worked.

The group included Khoe people and persons of mixed-race descent who had succeeded in acquiring property and establishing themselves as farmers in their own right. The term Orlam (Oorlam) was sometimes applied to persons who could also be known as Baster. Orlams were the Khoe and mixed-race people who spoke Dutch and practised a largely European way of life. Basters distinguished themselves from the Coloured, whom they described as descendants of Europeans and Malay or Indonesian slaves brought to South Africa.

In the early 18th century, Basters often owned farms in the colony. However, with growing competition for land and the pressure of race discrimination, they were oppressed by their white neighbours and the government. Some became absorbed into the Coloured servant class, but those seeking to maintain independence moved to the fringes of settlement. From about 1750, the Kamiesberge in the extreme north-west of the colony became the main area of settlement of independent Baster farmers, some of whom had substantial followings of servants and clients.

After about 1780, increasing competition and oppression from whites in this area resulted in the majority of the Baster families moving to the frontier of the interior. They settled in the middle valley of the Orange River, where they settled near De Tuin. Basters of the middle Orange were subsequently persuaded by London Missionary Society missionaries to adopt the name Griqua. Some sources say they chose the name themselves in honour of an early leader.

=== Move to central Namibia ===
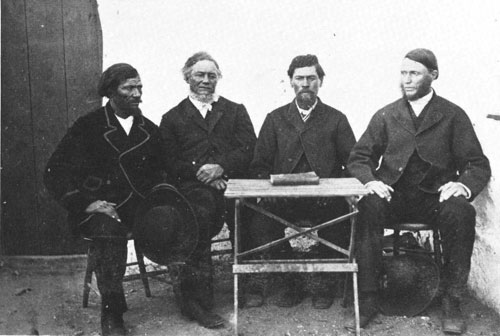
The first council of the Rehoboth Basters, 1872. First Kaptein Hermanus van Wyk is the third from left; the book on the table is the Vaderlike Wette, the constitution of the Basters. On the right is his brother Christoffel van Wyk. Their father was Cornelius van Wyk.

Basters announced their intention to leave the Cape Colony in 1868 to search for land in the interior north. About 90 families of 100 left the region, the first 30 in 1869, with others following. They settled in Rehoboth in what is now central Namibia, on a high plateau between the Namib and Kalahari deserts. There they continued an economy based on managing herds of cattle, sheep, and goats. They were followed by Johann Christian Friedrich Heidmann, a missionary of the Rhenish Mission, who served them from 1871 until his retirement in 1907.

By 1872, Basters numbered 333 in Rehoboth. They founded the Free Republic of Rehoboth (Rehoboth Gebiet) and designed a German-influenced national flag. They adopted a constitution known as the Paternal Laws (original title in Afrikaans: Vaderlike Wette). It continues to govern the internal affairs of the Baster community into the 21st century. The original document survived and is stored at the National Archives of Namibia in Windhoek.

Basters established a community based on birth. Under these laws, a citizen is a child of a Rehoboth citizen, or a person otherwise accepted as a citizen by its rules. Families continued to join them from the Cape Colony, and the community reached about 800 by 1876, when 80 to 90 families had settled there. The area was also occupied by native Damara people, but Basters did not include them in population reports.

While Basters remained predominantly based around Rehoboth, some Basters continued to trek northward, settling in the southern Angolan city of Lubango. There they became known as the Ouivamo. They had a similar culture based on maintaining herds of livestock.

Through the 1870s, Basters of Rehoboth suffered frequent losses from their herds, with livestock raided and stolen by the much larger groups of surrounding Nama and Herero peoples, who were themselves in competition. In 1880, Jan Afrikaner gathered 600 men against the Herero, and different Nama groups mustered about 1,000 warriors, with the Herero fielding about the same number. Basters tried to make alliances to survive, as they were outnumbered by both sides. The wars continued until about 1884, and, while suffering losses, Basters continued.

Through the 1880s, the community at Rehoboth were joined by other Baster families from Grootfontein (South) (whom missionary Heidmann had earlier tried to recruit), Okahandja, and Otjimbingwe. While based on descent within the families, they also accepted both blacks and whites who applied to join the community.

=== German South West Africa ===
In the process of the German annexation of South West Africa, Baster Kaptein Hermanus van Wyk signed a 'Treaty of Protection and Friendship' with the German Empire on 11 October 1884. It was the first of its kind between any native-descended peoples in the territory and the Germans (Basters were considered native because of their partial African descent). Other sources date this treaty 15 September 1885, Under this, "the independent executive powers of the Kaptein and Baster Council, especially for "foreign policy", were significantly curtailed."

In 1893, the Germans established the territory of the Basters, known as the Rehoboth Gebiet, which the settlers tried to expand through negotiation. In this area, the Paternal Laws were recognised. In addition, the German colony had an administrative district known as Rehoboth, which was larger than the Baster-governed area, with the outside areas under German (white) colonial law. Most of the land was developed as farms owned by European, especially German whites.

A second Treaty concerning National Service of the Rehoboth Basters of 1895 established a small armed contingent among the Basters, which fought alongside German colonists and forces in a number of battles and skirmishes against other indigenous peoples. When the German colonists encountered a new wave of conflicts with native peoples, Basters fought with them in quelling the uprisings of the OvaHerero (1896), the Swartbooi Nama (1897), and the Bondelswarts (1903). They also participated in the German colonial war.

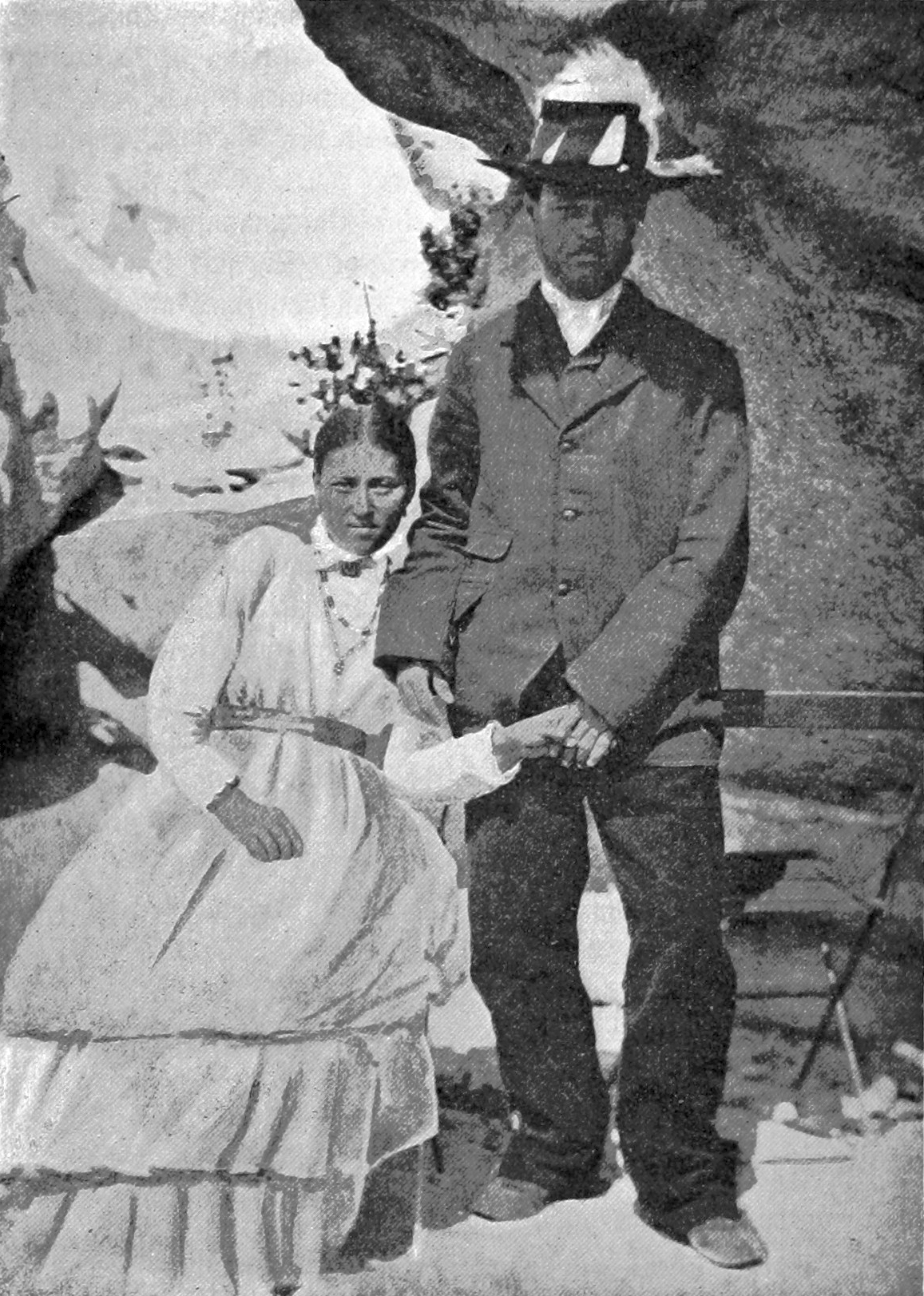
Rehoboth, 1896

German census reporting on Basters noted their high mobility. The numbers they recorded for the people changed as the Germans changed their racial classifications. Rather than using people's citizenship (as in the community of Basters), they began to classify people according to appearance, as was done in South Africa. A comparison of records suggests that, in 1912, there were about 3,000 Basters in the Rehoboth District. Most Basters were concentrated in the Rehoboth Gebiet, where they lived under their own law.

Relations between Rehoboth and Germany remained close for more than 20 years until 1914, following the outbreak of World War I. The German Schutztruppe ordered all Baster able-bodied men into military service, which they resisted. Believing that the German Schutztruppe had little chance against the superior South African forces (allied with the British), Basters tried to maintain neutrality towards both, but feared losing their limited autonomy.

The Baster Council believed they reached agreement with Governor Theodor Seitz of South-West Africa that their men would only be used behind the lines. They did not want to participate in a war between whites. They disapproved of their men being issued German uniforms, fearing they would be considered regular soldiers. Despite their protests, Baster soldiers were assigned to duties far from the Gebiet. When Basters were assigned to guard South African prisoners of war in February 1915 at a camp at Uitdraii, they protested because nearly 50 of their men were connected to the people through historic kinship and language. Some aided escape by prisoners, and the Germans limited the number of bullets they issued to the Basters. The South Africans in turn protested being guarded by men they considered as Coloured (according to their racial classifications).

General Louis Botha had earlier written to Lieutenant Colonel Franke against using armed non-whites in service, as he was aware of both Cameroons and Basters serving under arms. Botha said he was ensuring that non-whites were not armed; Franke said that he was using the Cameroon and Baster companies only to police non-white communities.

Cornelius van Wyk, second Kaptein of the Rehoboth Basters, arranged to secretly meet with South African General Louis Botha on 1 April in Walvis Bay to assure him of the Basters' neutrality. No record was made of the meeting so it is unclear exactly what was promised. Van Wyk was hoping for assurances to have Baster territory and rights acknowledged if South Africa took over the German colony. Botha advised him to stay out of the war.

Due to South African successes, the German officers advised the Baster Council that they were moving the prisoners of war and Baster guards to the north. At a meeting, they said Basters had three days to decide whether to comply; the latter feared that having their men in the north would mean they would be considered true combatants against South Africa, endangering their own position. Learning of the planned deployment, the Baster guards advised the Council they would not go. Although negotiations were in process, they learned the trains were due to leave the next day, and the night of 18 April, numerous Basters defected from German service, taking arms with them that they intended to turn in at Rehoboth. About 300 men set up defences in two laagers. Learning of this, the Germans disarmed other Baster soldiers in other posts; in the process, one unarmed Baster was killed. Rehoboth was in an uproar, although leaders tried to meet with the Germans to resolve the issues.

In the meantime, Basters and Nama policemen worked to disarm German officers within the Rehoboth Gebiet, but wounded one fatally and killed another outright. An armed contingent including Nama policemen killed several German citizens, including all of the Karl Bauer family. With that, negotiations were over.

On 22 April 1915, Lieutenant Colonel Bethe informed the Basters in writing that they had violated the protection treaty and their acts were considered hostile by the Germans. Governor Theodor Seitz cancelled the protection treaty with the Basters, intending to attack Rehoboth. Van Wyk informed General Botha, who advised him to try to get the Basters out of the area. They started moving by wagons and taking large herds of livestock, with many Basters trying to reach the mountains. German attacks against Basters took place around the region.

According to Baster history, a 14-year-old Baster girl, who worked for the Germans in a camp, overheard a drunken conversation about their planned attack against the Basters. She took the word to the Kaptein, and around 700 Basters retreated to Sam Khubis 80 kilometres (50 mi) south-east of Rehoboth in the mountains, to prepare for German attack. This group included women and children. Van Wyk had hidden his wife and children at farm Garies, along with the wives and children of Stoffel and Willem van Wyk. Stoffel's wife, two children, an adult daughter of Cornelius van Wyk, and his 18-year-old son, were all killed there. The others, including van Wyk's wife Sara, were taken to Leutwein station and released on 13 May.

On 8 May 1915, the Germans attacked in the Battle of Sam Khubis, where the stronghold was defended by 700 to 800 Basters. Despite repeated attacks and the use of two cannons and three Maxim machine-guns, the Germans were unable to destroy the Basters' position. They ended the attack at sunset. At the end of the day, Basters had all but run out of ammunition and expected defeat. That night they appealed to God, pledging to commemorate the day forever should they be spared.

Their prayer is engraved on a memorial plaque they later installed at Sam Khubis and reads:

God van ons vaderen / sterke en machtige God / heilig is Uw naam op die ganse aarde / Uw die de hemelen geschapen heft / neigt Uw oor tot ons / luister na die smekingen van Uwe kinderen / de dood staart ons in het gesicht / die kinderen der bose zoeken onze levens / Red ons uit die hand van onze vijanden / en beskermt onze vrouen en kinderen / En dit zult vier ons en onze nacheschlacht zijn een dag als een Zondag / waarop wij Uw naam prijzen en Uw goedertierenheid tot in euwigheid niet vergeten

"God our father / strong and powerful / holy be Thy name all over the earth / Thou that made heaven / bow Thou down to us / listen to the cries of Thy children / death stares us in the face / the children of evil seek our lives / Save us from the hand of our enemies / and protect our wives and children / and this shall be for us and our kin a day like a Sunday / on which we shall praise Thy name / and Thy gratitude shall not be forgotten in eternity."

The Germans had received orders to retreat, which they did the next morning. Rehoboth's Baster community survived. This day is celebrated annually by Basters as integral to their history and fortitude. Both units of the Germans were ordered to retreat in order to mobilise against advancing South African troops which reached Rehoboth.

As Basters returned to Rehoboth, some killed Germans on their farms. The Germans posted some forces for protection, but withdrew them on 23 May as the South Africans approached. Basters took German livestock and plundered their farms, also attacking the two missionaries' houses. The bloodshed on both sides left long resentment after the war.

=== South African mandate rule (1915–1966) ===
South Africa defeated the Germans, concluding the Peace of Khorab on 9 July 1915. It formally took over administration of South-West Africa and established martial law. Colonel H. Mentz advised the Baster leaders to avoid all confrontation with the Germans, in an effort to defuse tensions, and to report livestock losses or other problems to his administration at Windhoek. He also said that South African patrols would regularly be sent to the Rehoboth area to keep the peace.

After the conclusion of the Great War, Basters applied to have their native land become a British Protectorate like Basutoland, but were turned down by South Africa. All special rights as granted to Basters by the Germans were revoked under the South African mandate to govern South-West Africa. South Africa conducted regular censuses of the Basters from 1921 to 1991; the records reflect their ideas about racial classifications.

Some Basters continued to push for the legitimacy of the 'Free Republic of Rehoboth'. Claiming that the republic had been recognised by the League of Nations, they said international law supported their desire for self-determination, which the League used as a principle in the organisation of new nations after the Great War. They asserted that the Republic should have the status of a sovereign nation. In 1952, Basters presented a petition to the United Nations (the successor to the League of Nations) to this effect, with no result. But they had some practical autonomy under South Africa.

During this period, some Baster leaders founded new political parties and were active in various movements in South-West Africa, also known as Namibia. By the early 1960s, they were among the first to petition the United Nations for international intervention to end the South African control of Namibia. The Owambo and other indigenous peoples also agitated for an end to South African colonialism, especially as that state had established apartheid with severe legal racial discrimination against the African peoples.

South Africa passed the 'Rehoboth Self-government Act' of 1976, providing a kind of autonomy for the Basters. They settled for a semi-autonomous Baster Homeland (known as Baster Gebiet) based around Rehoboth, similar in status to the South African bantustans.

This was established in 1976, and an election was held for Kaptein. In 1979, Johannes "Hans" Diergaardt won a court challenge to the disputed election, in which incumbent Ben Africa had placed first. Diergaardt was installed as the 5th Kaptein of the Basters in accordance with the regulations of the 1976 Rehoboth Self-Determination Act and the Basters' Paternal Laws.

In 1981, South West Africa had a population of one million, divided into more than a dozen ethnic and tribal groups, and 39 political parties. With not more than 35,000 people at the time, Basters had become one of the smaller minority groups in the country of over one million.

In the 1980s, Basters still controlled about 1.4 million hectares of farmland in this territory. In earlier times, requirements for farms were thought to be about 7,000 ha, but Basters claimed they could also survive with farms of 4,000 ha. Nonetheless, even by the 1930s they were having to find alternative forms of employment to support their population. In 1981, the Baster population was estimated to be about 25,181 by Hartmut Lang, according to his 1998 article on the Baster group. Requirements for viable farms suggest that Namibia could not achieve self-sufficiency for its expanding population through farming; land redistribution could not yield enough area for viable farms.

=== Independence ===
The Baster Gebiet operated until 29 July 1989 and the imminent independence of Namibia. Upon assuming power in 1990, Namibia's new ruling party, the South West African People's Organisation (SWAPO), announced it would not recognise any special legal status for the Baster community. Many Basters felt that while SWAPO claimed it spoke for the whole country, it too strongly promoted the interests of its own political base in Ovamboland.

The Kaptein's Council sought compensation for Rehoboth lands that it claimed had been confiscated by the government, with much sold to non-Basters. The council was given locus standi (the right of a party to appear and be heard before a court), but "in 1995, a High Court verdict declared that Rehoboth lands were voluntarily handed over by the Rehoboth Baster community to the then new Namibian government."

In 1998, Kaptein Hans Diergaardt, elected in 1979 when Rehoboth had autonomous status under South Africa, filed an official complaint with the United Nations Human Rights Committee, charging Namibia with violations of minority rights of Basters. In Diergaardt v. Namibia (2000) the committee ruled that there was evidence of linguistic discrimination, as Namibia refused to use Afrikaans in dealing with Basters.

In 1999, following the death of Diergaardt, Basters elected John McNab as the 6th Kaptein of their community. He had no official status under the Namibian government. He protested against the government's management of former Baster land and said his farmers were forced to buy it back at high prices. Much of it has been sold to others since independence. In 2021, he was succeeded by Jacky Britz.

As preparations were underway for Sam Khubis Day in 2006, a respected social worker, Hettie Rose-Junius, asked the organising committee to "consider inviting a delegation from the Nama-speaking people to this year's festivities and in future." The chairperson rejected the suggestion by saying that historically the Nama had a separate fight with the Germans and were not involved with the Basters. Activities on this day include a re-enactment of the attack on the Basters in 1915, a flag raising, wreath laying and a church service.

In February 2007, the Kapteins Council has represented the Basters at the Unrepresented Nations and Peoples Organization (UNPO), an international pro-democracy organisation founded in 1991. Operating in The Hague, it works to "facilitate the voices of unrepresented and marginalised nations and peoples worldwide, helping minorities to gain self-determination." Since November 2012, the UNPO has called on the Namibian government to recognise Basters as a 'traditional authority' in their historic territory, as it has for some other ethnic groups in the country.

== Culture ==
=== Paternal Laws ===
The first Kaptein's Council established the Vaderlike Wette (Paternal Laws), established as a constitution of Baster people in the Free Republic of Rehoboth. These have influenced the actions of the Baster community into the 21st century, although they no longer have the force of law.

Basters have a long democratic tradition of electing their leadership. According to the Paternal Laws of 1872, a Kaptein is elected for life. This Kaptein was granted the powers to appoint members of a Council, and together they formed the Executive government of Rehoboth. The Paternal Laws also provided for a Peoples Council (Volksraad) which was elected every five years; it formed the Legislature of the Rehoboth government.

The Basters have had seven Kapteins since the Paternal Laws were enacted:

- 1872–1905: Hermanus van Wyk
- 1905–1914: Germans suspended the Kapteinship position and instead established a Basterrat (English: Council of Basters)
- 1914–1924: Cornelius van Wyk
- 1924–1925: Albert Mouton
- 1925–1975: The South African administration transferred all power from the Raad and the Kaptein to the Rehoboth Magistrate
- 1977–1979: Ben Africa
- 1979–1998: Hans Diergaardt
- 1999–2020: John McNab
- since 2021: Jacky Britz

Every male burger (citizen) of Rehoboth had the right to apply for a free piece of land at the age of 18. Although the size of this erf was decreased from 1,300 square metres (0.32 acres) to about 300 square metres (0.074 acres), due to land shortage and servicing costs, Basters continued to honour this provision until 21 March 1990, when the new socialist government took over the lands. The newly independent Namibian government passed legislation about land use and title that took precedence over Baster traditions. Basters can no longer allocate land to their young men. The land is controlled by the local town council, which replaced the Chief's Council.

=== Religion and genetics ===
Basters from Mainline churches are mostly Calvinist. They sing traditional hymns almost identical to those of the 17th-century Netherlands; these songs were preserved in the colony and their group during a period when the Netherlands churches were absorbing new music.

The average gene pool of Basters is about 48.4% European, 28.5% Khoe-San, 17.1% Asian and 5.7% Bantu; according to a 2013 autosomal genealogical DNA testing.

=== Traditional leadership ===
Largely through missionary work during the 19th century, they coalesced into fiercely independent, autonomous communities that maintained their identities even after being incorporated into the Cape Colony. Others moved farther north into what is now Namibia in the late 1860s because of pressure from Boer settlers and eventually established a settlement that became known as Rehoboth.

The first Kaptein was Hermanus van Wyk, the 'Moses' of the Baster nation, who led the community to Rehoboth from South Africa. He served as Kaptein until his death in 1905. After his death, the German colonial government established a separate council. The Rehoboth Basters did not elect another Kaptein until the United Kingdom took over the territory as a British Protectorate in 1914 during World War I. Basters elected Cornelius van Wyk as Kaptein. He was not officially recognised by the South African authorities, which administered the territory from 1915 to Namibian independence in 1990.

== Other Baster communities ==
Similar terms are used for unrelated mixed-race Dutch and native communities in South Africa and elsewhere. For instance, a mixed-race community in the Richtersveld in South Africa are known as the 'Boslys Basters.'

In Indonesia, the people of mixed Dutch and Indonesian descent are called Blaster(an).

== See also ==
- Griqua people
- Oorlam people
- Métis
- Quadroon
- High yellow
- Hans Beukes
- Diergaardt v. Namibia
- Rhineland Bastard
