= Rehoboth, Namibia =

Rehoboth Khoekhoe: ǀAnes
- Town
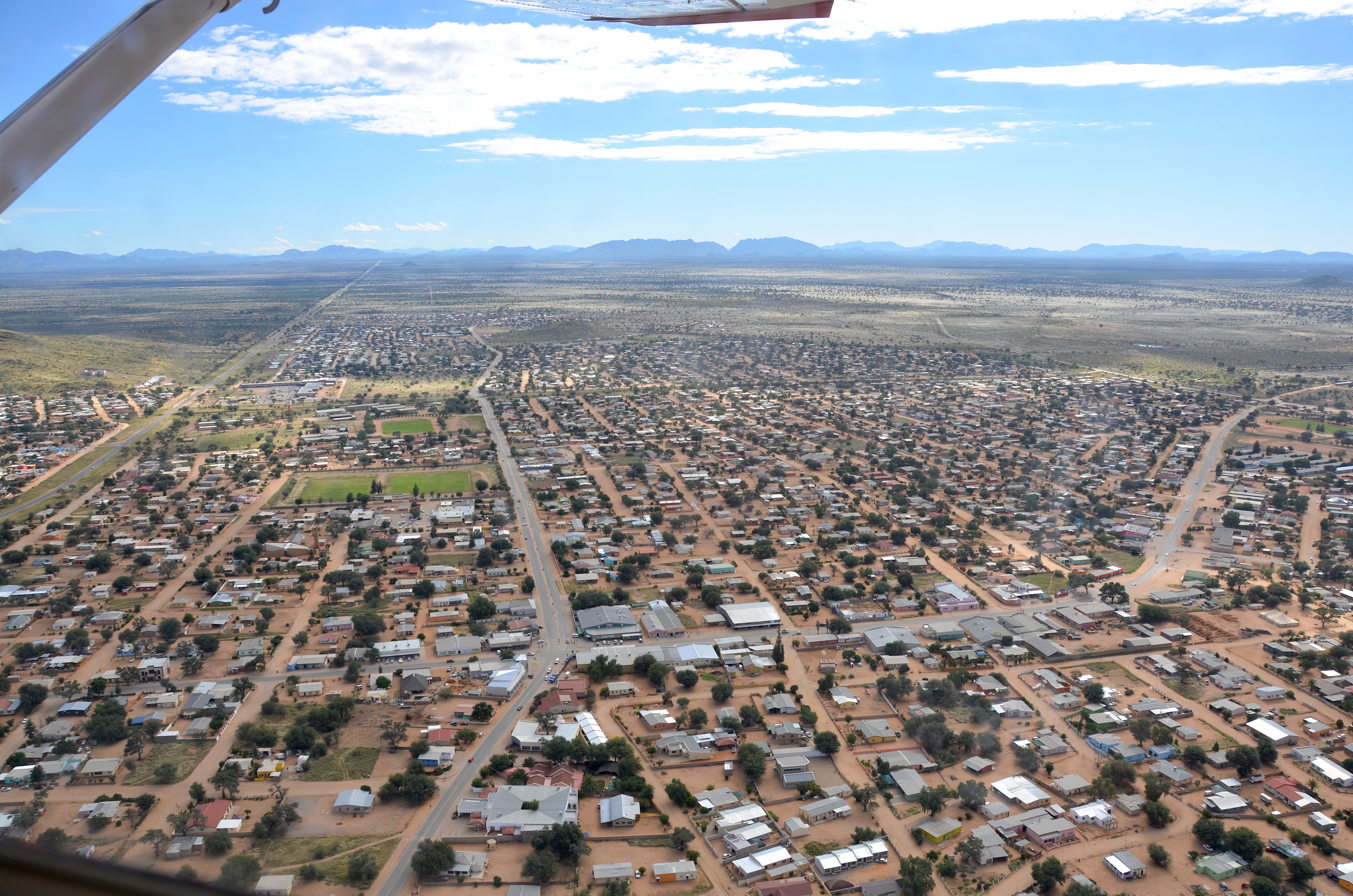
- Aerial view of Rehoboth (2017)

- Location in Namibia
- Coordinates: 23°19′S 17°05′E
- Country: Namibia
- Region: Hardap Region
- Constituencies: Rehoboth Urban West; Rehoboth Urban East

Government
  - Type: Town Council
  - Mayor: Justin Coetzee (UPM)

Area
  - Total: 639 km^{2} (247 sq mi)

Population (2023)
  - Total: 40,788
  - Density: 63.8/km^{2} (165/sq mi)
- Time zone: UTC+02:00 (CAT)
- Climate: BWh

Rehoboth is a town in the Hardap Region of central Namibia, just north of the Tropic of Capricorn. It had a population of 40,788 people in 2023.

Rehoboth is intersected from north to south by the national road B1, which also serves as the border of the two electoral constituencies in the town, Rehoboth Urban West and Rehoboth Urban East. Rehoboth is the core territory of the Baster community which still lives according to their Paternal Laws which were enacted in 1872.

== Geography ==
Rehoboth lies on a high elevation plateau with several natural hot-water springs. It is situated 90 km (56 mi) south of the Namibian capital Windhoek on the B1 national road. The B1 intersects Rehoboth from north to south and also serves as the border of the two electoral constituencies in the town, Rehoboth Urban West and Rehoboth Urban East.

It receives sparse mean annual rainfall of 240 millimetres (9.4 in), although in the 2010/2011 rainy season a record 731 millimetres (28.8 in) were measured.

=== Demographics ===
The majority of the population consists of Basters.

Historical population
Year	Pop.	±% p.a.
2001	21,308	—
2011	28,834	+3.07%
2023	40,788	+2.93%

== Economy and infrastructure ==
The town is served by Rehoboth railway station. There is also a private landing strip for small aircraft near the Oanob Dam. To the west is Gamsberg Nature Reserve. Public amenities include a public hospital, primary and secondary schools and a district court with resident magistrate. The Oanob Dam, approximately six kilometres (4 miles) from Rehoboth, supplies the town with fresh water.

== History ==
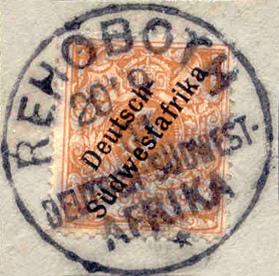
Stamps for German South West Africa postmarked Rehoboth 1901

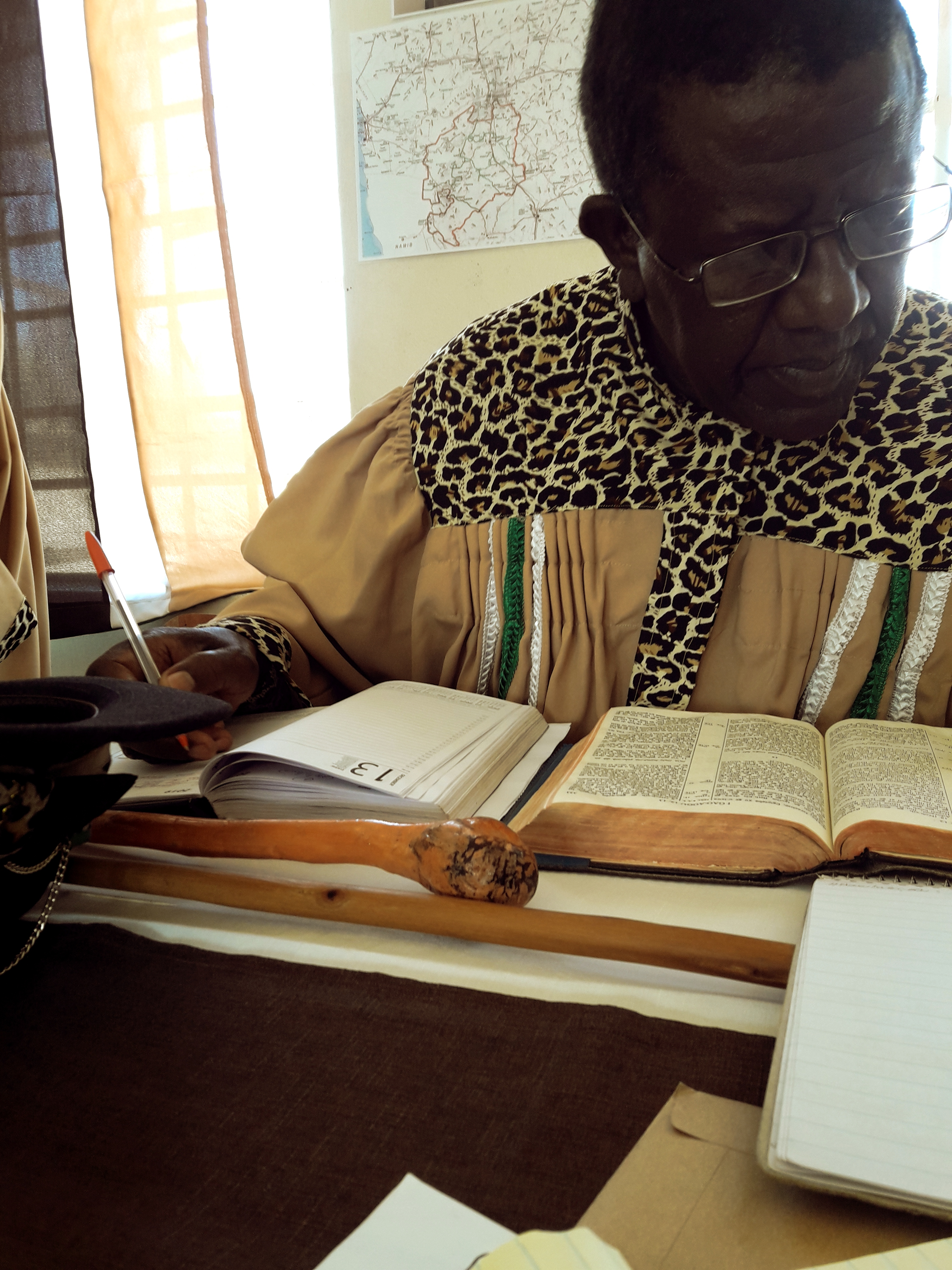
Kai ǀGarub (traditional regnal title [Great Leopard]) Chief Hans Eichab of the ǃAinîn Traditional Community of the ǂAixa (Copper beaded) clan of the ǀGôakōsema Great House from the Garise royal lineage.

The indigenous people of Rehoboth and its surroundings are the Damaras, of the ǃAinîn traditional community (or rather the Dama of the ǃAib [aka ǀHūǃgaoben]), a sub clan of the ǀGowanîn (Dune Damaras/ Damaras of the Kalahari). They first came upon the hot water springs after the fall of the Damara cohession in the 16th century and named the site ǀGaoǁnāǀaus (Fountain of the falling buffalo). The ǃAinîn later permanently settled at ǃNawases 11 km (7 mi) NE of Rehoboth in the mid 1700s under the reign of chief Xomaǀkhāb (third in line of chieftain chronology) circa 1725- (1750). The traditional community is as per post-independent Namibian legislative framework is administered by a traditional authority (ǃAinîn Traditional Authority) under the reign of Kai ǀGarub (regnal title- "Great Leopard") Chief Hans Eichab. ǀGaoǁnāǀaus was later renamed ǀAnes (place of smoke) by the Kaiǁkhaun (Rooinasie Nama of ǃHoaxaǃnâs) who for a short period had settled there before migrating to Hoachanas. The "smoke" referred to the steam that was rising over the hot water fountains on cold winter mornings. The ǀHūǃgaoben decided to settle at a distance from the fauna rich springs of Rehoboth so as not chase away game roaming the site.

In 1845, ǁKhauǀgôan (Swartbooi) clan arrived under the leadership of Willem Swartbooi (ǃHuiseb ǂHaobemâb) and Franz Heinrich Kleinschmidt of the German Rhenish Missionary Society. Kleinschmidt named the place Rehoboth that year, and established a Rhenish Mission Station there. In 1864, the Nama abandoned the area as a result of an attack by the Orlam Afrikaners. Rehoboth (רחובות) means "broad/open places" in Biblical Hebrew. The arrival of the ǀHôaǀaran (Oorlam Afrikaner) in ǀAeǁgams (Windhoek) in 1840 marked the start of the ǀHôaǀaran-ǁKhauǀgôan (Oorlam Afrikaner-Swartbooi Nama) feud. This feud lasted from 1840 to 1865, as the Oorlam Afrikaner attacked the Swartbooi Nama at Rehoboth in a bloody clash resulting in the Swartbooi Namas fleeing to ǃAmaib in ǃOeǂgâb (Erongo region). The Rehoboth area was mostly bare except the Swartbooi Nama who were sheltered by the ǀHūǃgaoben.

In 1870, the Basters, who had migrated out of the Cape Colony in 1868, moved into the territory and were granted permission to settle at Rehoboth by the participants of the peace conference of Okahandja on 23 September 1870. Paternal Laws, the constitution of the Rehoboth Basters, were enacted in 1872. The Baster community of Rehoboth still lives according to these.

Within a few years, the Basters were closely linked to the town of Rehoboth and became identified as Rehoboth Basters or Rehobothers. The population increased rapidly from an initial number of 333 in 1870, 800 in 1874 and 1500 by 1885. The growing Baster population settled in the surrounding areas, which would become known as the Rehoboth Gebiet ("Gebiet": German: area).

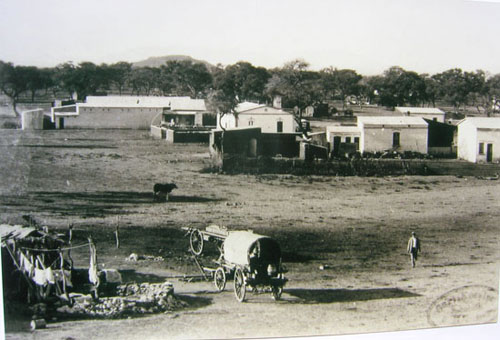
Rehoboth in 1908

In 1885, Baster Kaptein Hermanus van Wyk signed a 'Treaty of Protection and Friendship' with the German Empire which permitted him to retain a degree of autonomy in exchange for recognizing colonial rule. Relations between Rehoboth and Germany remained close for more than twenty years, but in 1914, following the outbreak of World War I, Germany's use of Baster soldiers to guard South African prisoners — contrary to the terms of their enlistment — led to armed revolt. German forces then attacked Rehoboth, committed atrocities against Baster civilians and attacked refugees encamped upon the mountain of Sam Khubis, but, despite repeated attacks and the use of superior weaponry, were unable to destroy the Basters' position. On the following day the Germans retreated and Rehoboth's Baster community was reprieved.

Namibia was occupied by South Africa in 1915 and, ten years later, a second rebellion broke out at Rehoboth. This revolt collapsed, however, when colonial forces, armed with machine guns and supported by two warplanes, marched into the town and arrested more than 600 people.

== Politics ==
Rehoboth is divided into eight neighbourhoods, called blocks. The oldest part of the town is blocks A, B and C, of which block B contains most public services and shops. Block D is home to the wealthiest inhabitants of the town. Block E is the poorest neighbourhood and was originally (under Apartheid) designated for blacks. Blocks F, G and H are the newest neighbourhoods. The current mayor of the town is Mr. Pieters, living in Block E.

Administratively, Rehoboth is classified as a town with its own council of 7 elected individuals.

The 2015 local authority election was won by the SWAPO party which gained four seats (4,519 votes), while the local United People's Movement (UPM) gained three seats (3,101 votes). The 2020 local authority election was narrowly won by the newly formed Landless People's Movement (LPM) which scored well all over Hardap. LPM gained 2,468 votes and two seats in the town council, followed by SWAPO with two seats and 2,322 votes. The local Rehoboth Independent Town Management Association also obtained two seats (1,523 votes), and the remaining seat went to the UPM (841 votes).

== People from Rehoboth ==
- Hermanus Beukes, early petitioner for Namibian independence
- Vernon Cloete, cricketer
- Cliven Loubser, international Rugby Player for Namibia.
- Anicia Peters, CEO of the National Commission of Research, Science and Technology (NCRST)
- Piet Junius, Rehoboth Baster politician
- Ofree Eitan "Tuchman" Tenne, librarian
