= H. dichotoma =

H. dichotoma may refer to:

- Hoppea dichotoma, a plant species
- Hyphaene dichotoma, a palm species found in India
