= Doom Tree =

Doom Tree may refer to:

- Doomtree, band
- Hyphaene thebaica, tree (also known as doum palm and gingerbread tree).
