= C18H20O4 =

The molecular formula C_{18}H_{20}O_{4} (molar mass : 300.34 g/mol, exact mass : 300.13615913) may refer to:

- Angoletin, CAS number 76444-55-8
- 3beta-Acetoxycacalohastine 62706-45-0
- Callosumin, CAS number 22318-83-8
- Domohinone, CAS number 200067-24-9
- Galanganol A, CAS number 864073-15-4
- Galanganol B, CAS number 864073-17-6
- Hibicuslide B, CAS number 853233-58-6
- 2-Hydroxy-3,4,6-trimethoxychalcene, CAS number 279219-88-4
- 2'-Hydroxy-4',6'-dimethoxy-3'-methyldihydrochalcone, CAS number 65349-37-3
- 4'-Hydroxy-5,7-dimethoxy-8-methylflavan, a flavan
- 5-O-Methyllatifolin, CASnumber 18525-14-9
- Magnolignan C, CAS number 93697-42-8
- Myrigalon B, CAS number 34328-55-7
- Stemanthrene C, CAS number 674774-84-6
- Toxyl angelate, CAS number 106928-36-3
- 2,2,4-Trimethyl-6-(1-oxo-3-phenylpropyl)-1,3,5-cyclohexanetrione, CAS number 34328-57-9
- 5,7,4'-Trimethoxyflavan, a flavan
