= Diffutidin =

- Chemical structure of diffutidin

Names
- IUPAC name (2S)-3′,4′-Dimethoxyflavan-5,7-diol
- Systematic IUPAC name (2S)-2-(3,4-Dimethoxyphenyl)-3,4-dihydro-2H-1-benzopyran-5,7-diol

Identifiers
CAS Number	89289-92-9
3D model (JSmol)	Interactive image; Interactive image
ChemSpider	24842661
PubChem CID	44257194
UNII	LK28XSQ4LJ
CompTox Dashboard (EPA)	DTXSID60658061
- InChI: InChI=1S/C17H18O5/c1-20-15-5-3-10(7-17(15)21-2)14-6-4-12-13(19)8-11(18)9-16(12)22-14/h3,5,7-9,14,18-19H,4,6H2,1-2H3/t14-/m0/s1 Key: NMMYBAVYBMEWOL-AWEZNQCLSA-N
- SMILES: COc(c3)c(OC)cc(c3)[C@H](C2)Oc(c1)c(C2)c(O)cc(O)1; COc1ccc(cc1OC)[C@@H]2CCc3c(cc(cc3O2)O)O

Properties
Chemical formula	C_{17}H_{18}O_{5}
Molar mass	302.32 g/mol
- Except where otherwise noted, data are given for materials in their standard state (at 25 °C [77 °F], 100 kPa). verify (what is ?) Infobox references

Diffutidin is a flavan, a type of flavonoid. It can be found in Canscora diffusa.

== Metabolism ==
Diffutin is a glucoside of diffutidin.
