= Diffutin =

- Chemical structure of diffutin

Names
- IUPAC name (2S)-2-(3,4-Dimethoxyphenyl)-7-hydroxy-3,4-dihydro-2H-1-benzopyran-5-yl β-D-glucopyranoside
- Systematic IUPAC name (2S,3R,4S,5S,6R)-2-{[(2S)-2-(3,4-Dimethoxyphenyl)-7-hydroxy-3,4-dihydro-2H-1-benzopyran-5-yl]oxy}-6-(hydroxymethyl)oxane-3,4,5-triol

Identifiers
CAS Number	89289-91-8
3D model (JSmol)	Interactive image
ChEBI	CHEBI:4536
ChemSpider	390804
PubChem CID	442352
UNII	KG8Q5D3TT5
CompTox Dashboard (EPA)	DTXSID301008743
- InChI: InChI=1S/C23H28O10/c1-29-15-5-3-11(7-18(15)30-2)14-6-4-13-16(31-14)8-12(25)9-17(13)32-23-22(28)21(27)20(26)19(10-24)33-23/h3,5,7-9,14,19-28H,4,6,10H2,1-2H3/t14-,19+,20+,21-,22+,23+/m0/s1 Key: ZNWIOJJMPZWSQO-YRDUZITASA-N
- SMILES: c(c4)(c(OC)cc(c4)[C@@H](O3)CCc(c31)c(O[C@@H]([C@@H](O)2)OC(CO)[C@@H]([C@@H]2O)O)cc(O)c1)OC

Properties
Chemical formula	C_{23}H_{28}O_{10}
Molar mass	464.467 g·mol^{−1}
- Except where otherwise noted, data are given for materials in their standard state (at 25 °C [77 °F], 100 kPa). verify (what is ?) Infobox references

Diffutin is a flavan, a type of flavonoid. It can be found in Canscora diffusa and in Hoppea dichotoma.

== Metabolism ==
Diffutin is a glucoside of diffutidin.
