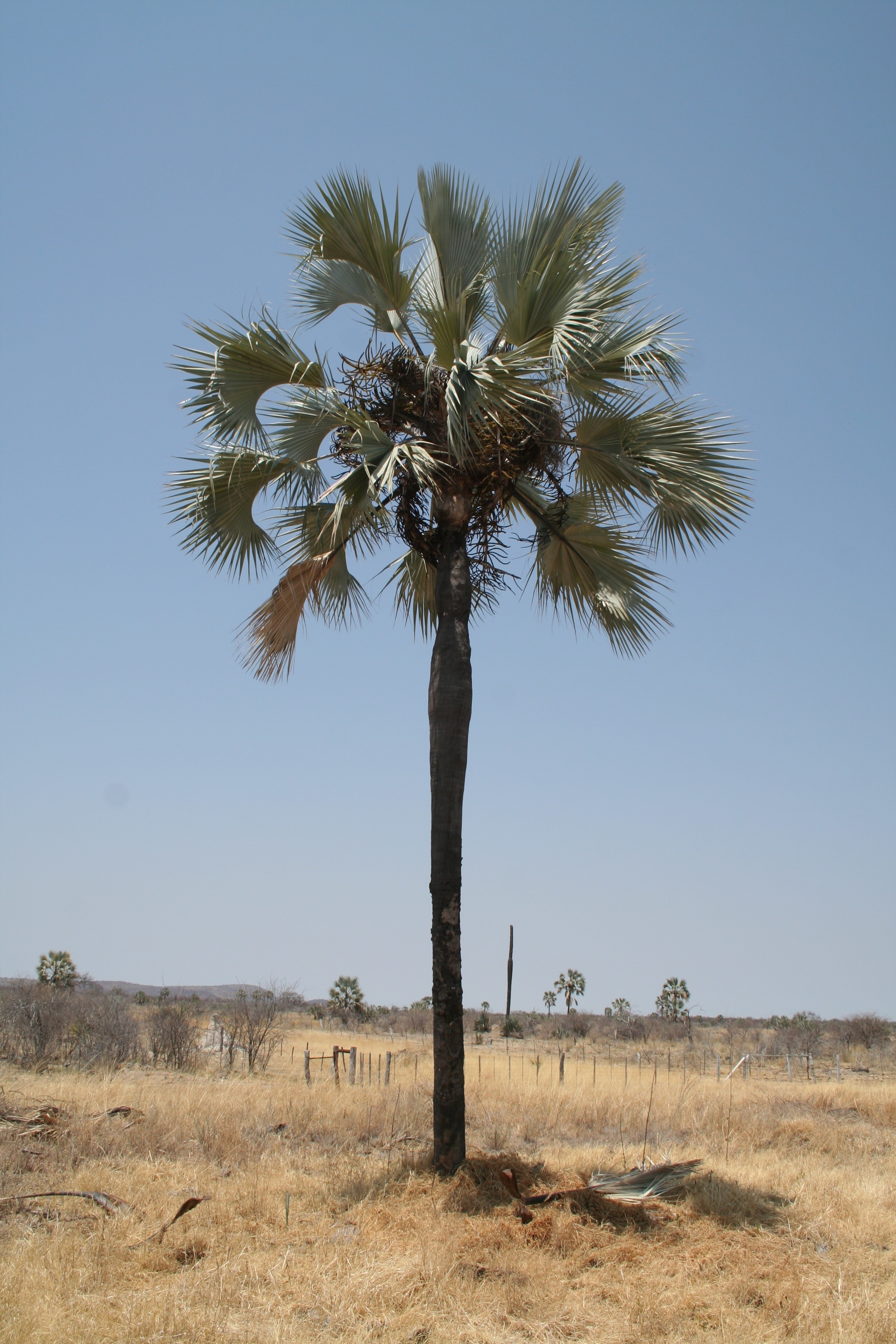

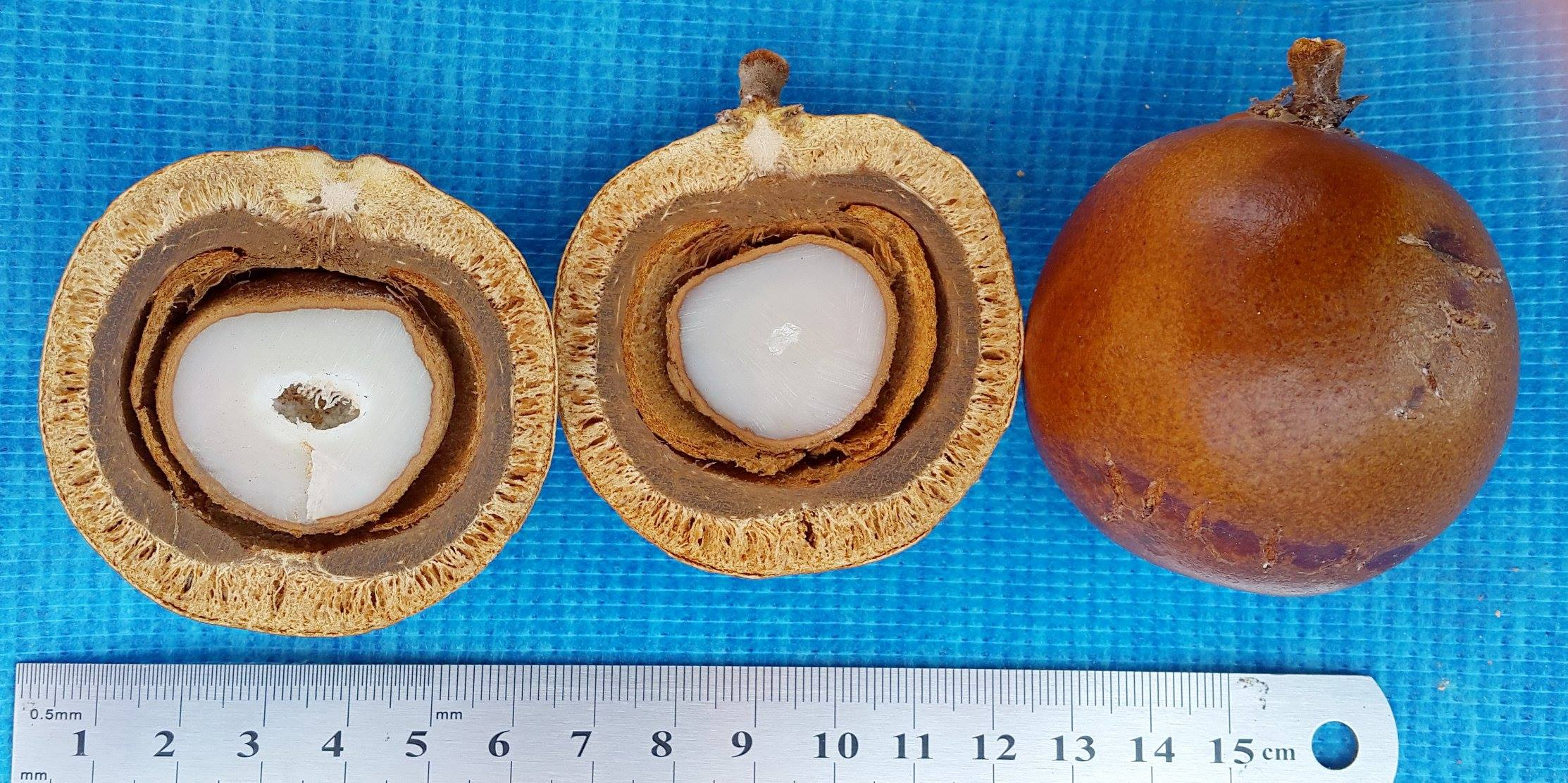
- Specimen in northern Namibia, and the spherical fruit with cross-section

Scientific classification
- Kingdom: Plantae
- Clade: Tracheophytes
- Clade: Angiosperms
- Clade: Monocots
- Clade: Commelinids
- Order: Arecales
- Family: Arecaceae
- Genus: Hyphaene
- Species: H. petersiana

Binomial name
- Hyphaene petersiana Klotzsch ex Mart., 1845

Synonyms
- Chamaeriphes benguelensis (Welw. ex H.Wendl.) Kuntze; Chamaeriphes ventricosa (J.Kirk) Kuntze; Hyphaene aurantiaca Dammer; Hyphaene benguellensis Welw. ex H.Wendl.; Hyphaene benguelensis var. ventricosa (J.Kirk) Furtado; Hyphaene bussei Dammer; Hyphaene goetzei Dammer; Hyphaene obovata Furtado; Hyphaene ovata Furtado; Hyphaene plagiocarpa Dammer; Hyphaene ventricosa J.Kirk; Hyphaene ventricosa subsp. ambolandensis Becc.; Hyphaene ventricosa subsp. anisopleura Becc.; Hyphaene ventricosa subsp. aurantiaca (Dammer) Becc.; Hyphaene ventricosa subsp. benguelensis (Welw. ex H.Wendl.) Becc.; Hyphaene ventricosa subsp. bussei (Dammer) Becc.; Hyphaene ventricosa subsp. goetzei (Dammer) Becc.; Hyphaene ventricosa subsp. petersiana (Klotzsch ex Mart.) Becc.; Hyphaene ventricosa subsp. plagiocarpa (Dammer) Becc.; Hyphaene ventricosa subsp. russisiensis Becc.; Hyphaene ventricosa subsp. useguhensis Becc.

= Hyphaene petersiana =

Species of palm tree

Hyphaene petersiana, the real fan palm or makalani palm, is a palm tree native to the subtropical, low-lying regions of south central Africa.

== Range and habitat ==
It is found in Burundi, Rwanda, the DRC, Tanzania, Angola, Mozambique, Malawi, Zambia, Zimbabwe, Botswana, Namibia and the northern and north-eastern Limpopo. Its habitat is open woodland, flood plains, banks of rivers and the fringes of pans and swamps.

== Reproduction ==
As with other Hyphaene species, H. petersiana is dioicous and the female plants produce copious fruit of around 60 mm in diameter. Up to 2,000 fruits may be found on a tree, the combined yield of about four seasons. The seeds germinate with difficulty but find saline conditions beneficial. They develop massive tap-roots which draw saline water deep underground. Though slow-growing, they may attain a maximum height of 18 metres. Typical adult plants however stand some 5 to 7 metres tall.

== Uses and associations ==
The plants are utilised by humans and animals. Repeated cutting of the growth point to obtain sap for palm wine production may eventually destroy the trees. The stem pith is edible. Beneath the outer fibrous husk of the fruit is a core of white endosperm known as vegetable ivory, initially soft and edible and containing some liquid comparable to coconut milk. The Ovambo people call the fruit of the Makalani palm eendunga and use it to distill ombike, their traditional liquor. African palm swifts and rufous-tailed palm-thrushes regionally depend on this species for breeding.

== Similar species ==
The species is similar to H. coriacea, which occurs to the southeast. It is however distinguishable by the shape of the fruit–round rather than pear-shaped–and the shape of the stem, which regularly bulges out below the foliage. B. aethiopum has a comparable stem shape.

== See also ==
- Fan palm

== Gallery ==
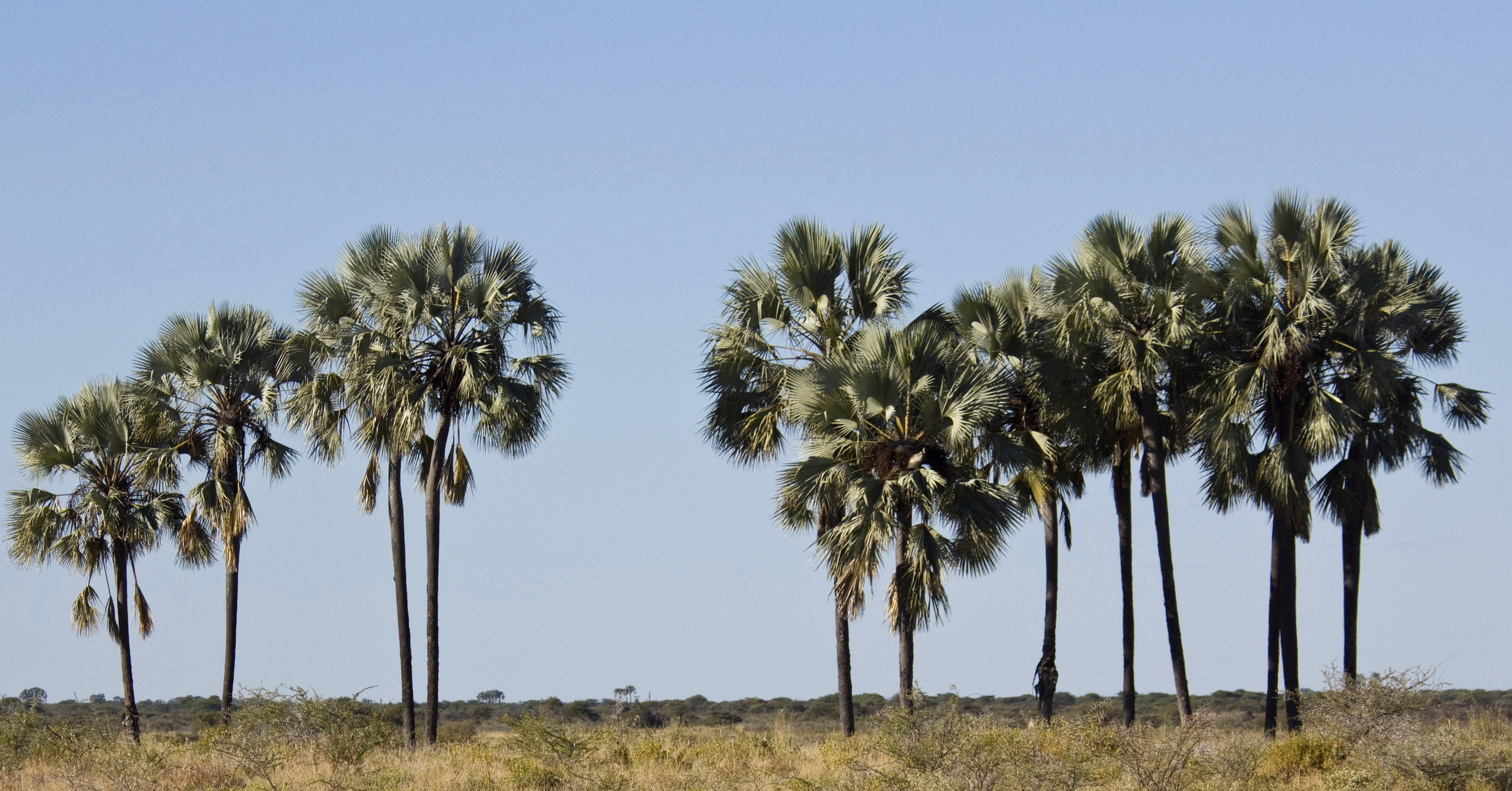
A grove of real fan palms at Namutoni, Etosha, Namibia

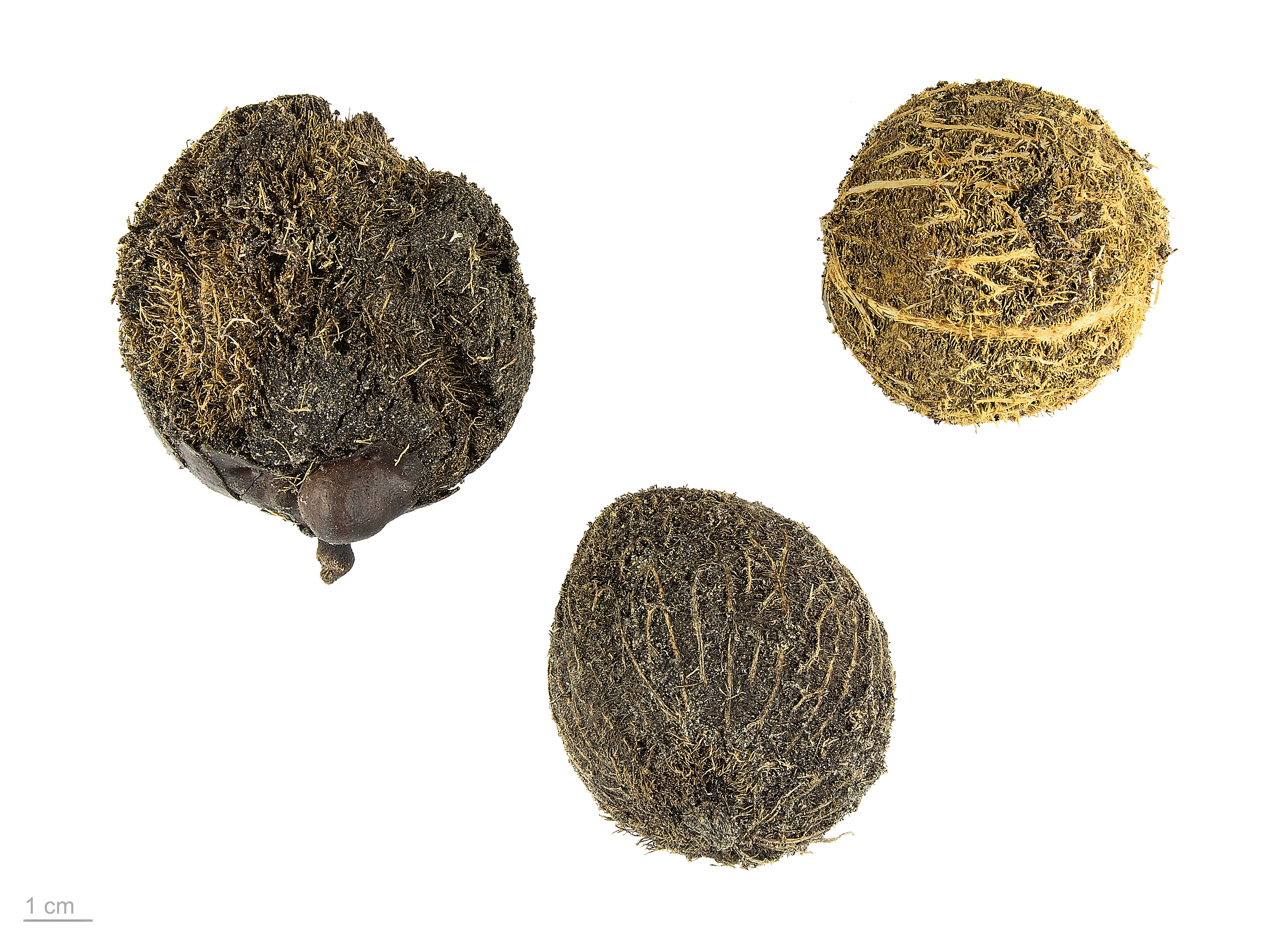
Fruit sans outer coat, showing thick fibrous coat covering the shell and endosperm, Namibia

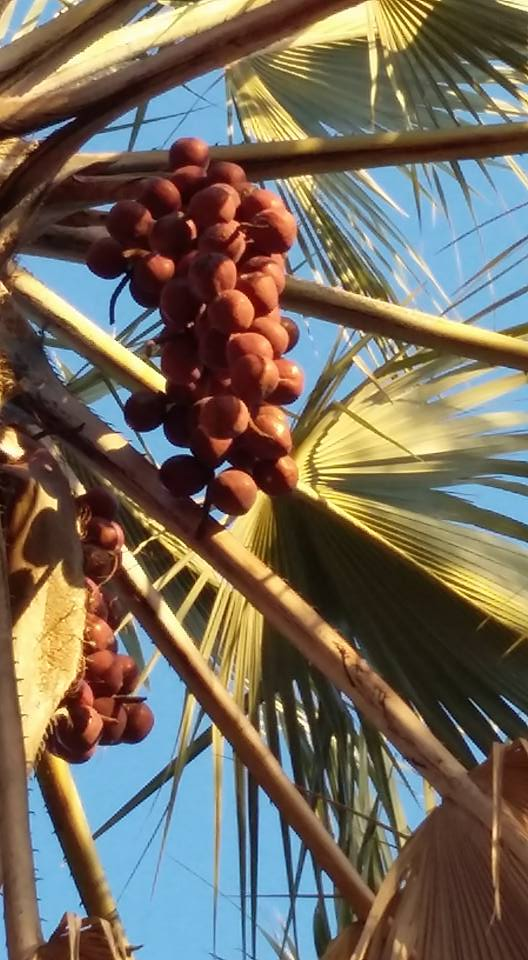
Infructescences at Shingwedzi, Kruger N. P.

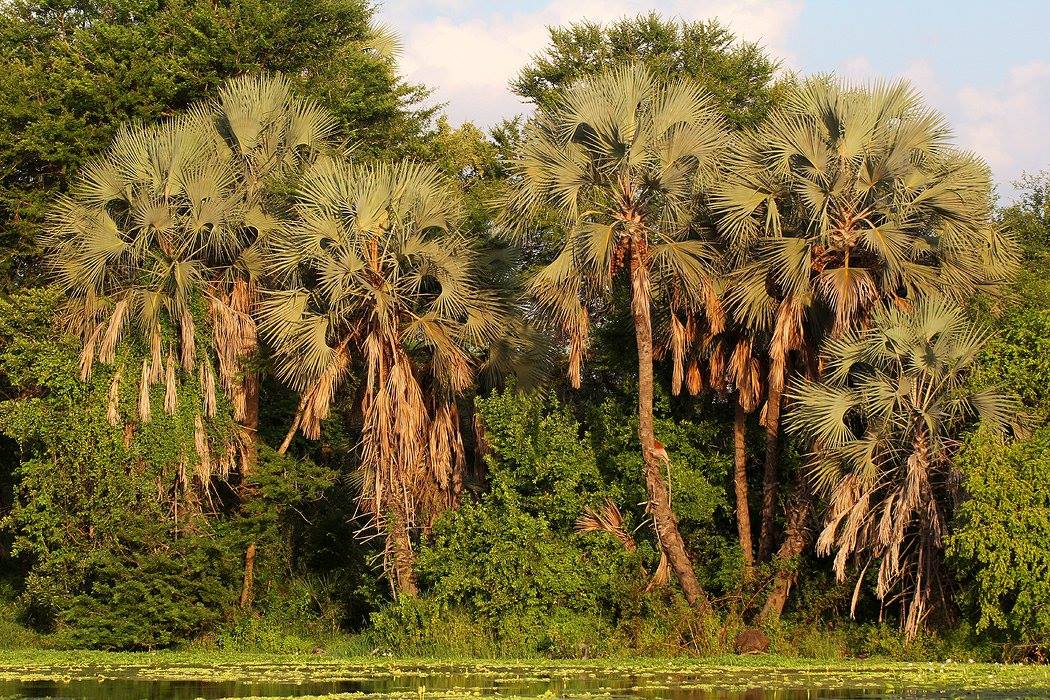
A waterside grove in Gorongosa Reserve, Mozambique
