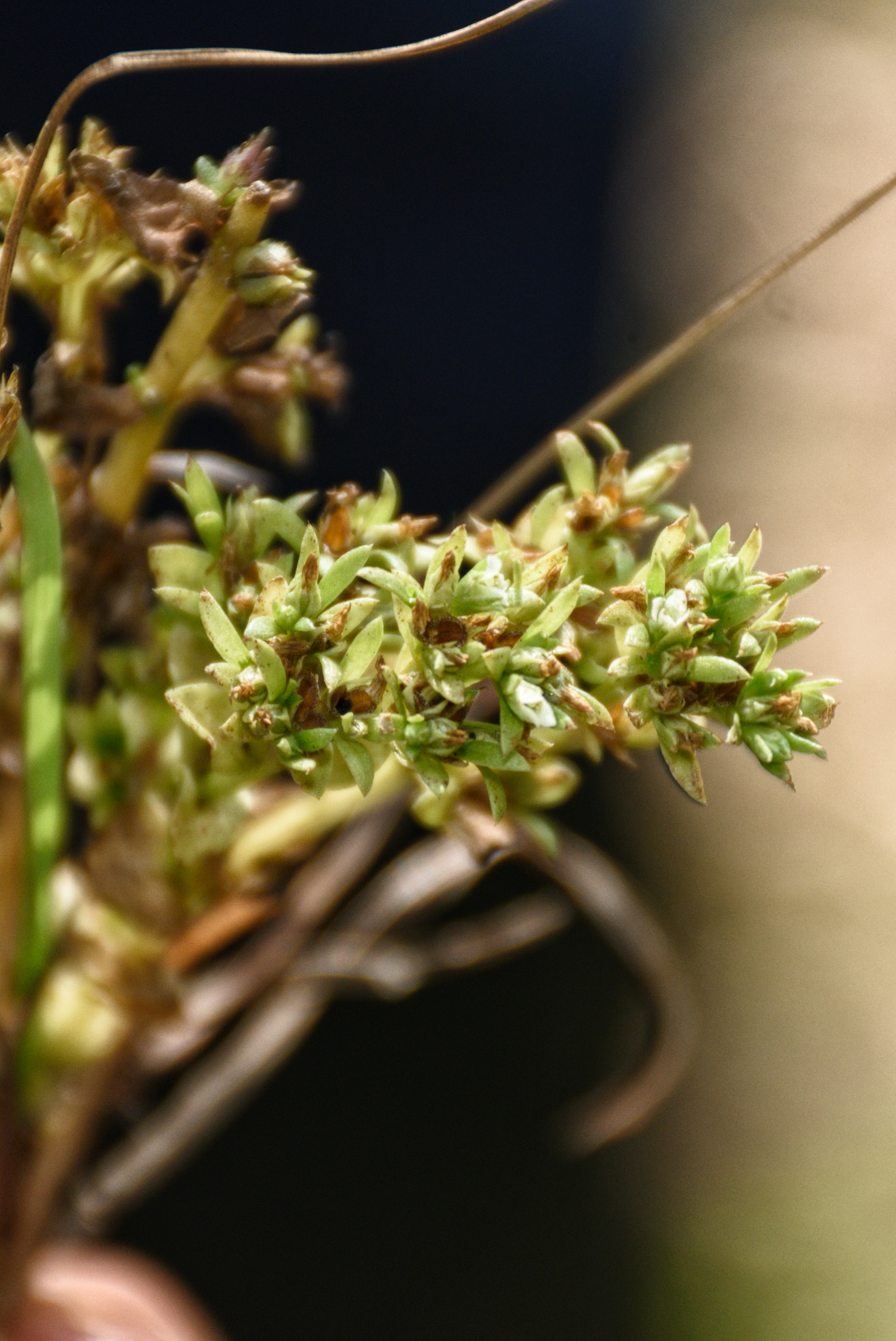
- Hoppea fastigiata at Kalliad

Conservation status
- Least Concern (IUCN 3.1)

Scientific classification
- Kingdom: Plantae
- Clade: Tracheophytes
- Clade: Angiosperms
- Clade: Eudicots
- Clade: Asterids
- Order: Gentianales
- Family: Gentianaceae
- Genus: Hoppea
- Species: H. fastigiata

Binomial name
- Hoppea fastigiata (Griseb.) C.B.Clarke

Synonyms
- Cicendia fastigiata Griseb.; Exacum concinnum Miq. ex C.B.Clarke; Exacum fastigiatum Arn. ex Griseb.; Pladera fastigiata C.B.Clarke; Pladera pusilla Thwaites

= Hoppea fastigiata =

Species of plant

Hoppea fastigiata is a species of herbaceous plant in the family Gentianaceae. It is a small branched herb with oppositely arranged ovate, subsessile leaves. White flowers appear in terminal or axillary cymes. Flowering and fruiting season is September-October.
