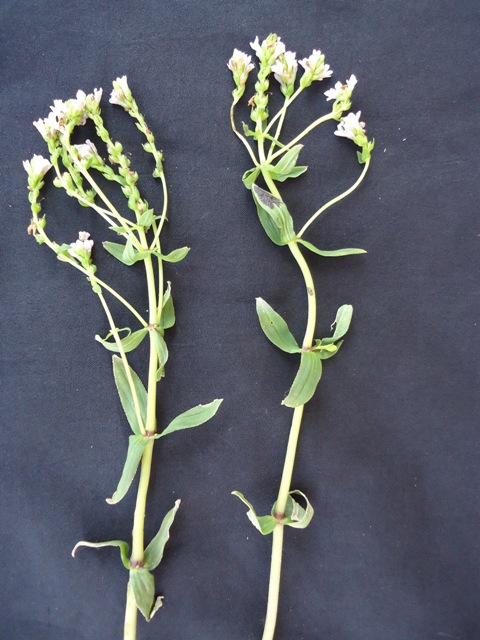

Scientific classification
- Kingdom: Plantae
- Clade: Tracheophytes
- Clade: Angiosperms
- Clade: Eudicots
- Clade: Asterids
- Order: Gentianales
- Family: Gentianaceae
- Genus: Hoppea
- Species: H. dichotoma

Binomial name
- Hoppea dichotoma Willd.

Synonyms
- Cicendia roxburghii Griseb.; Hopea dichotoma Vahl; Hoppea dichotoma f. pedicellata S.R.Paul; Pladera pusilla Roxb.

= Hoppea dichotoma =

Species of plant

Hoppea dichotoma is a plant species in the genus Hoppea. It is found in the Indian subcontinent and introduced into Ethiopia, Senegal and the Philippines.

Diffutin is a flavan, a type of flavonoid, found in H. dichotoma.
