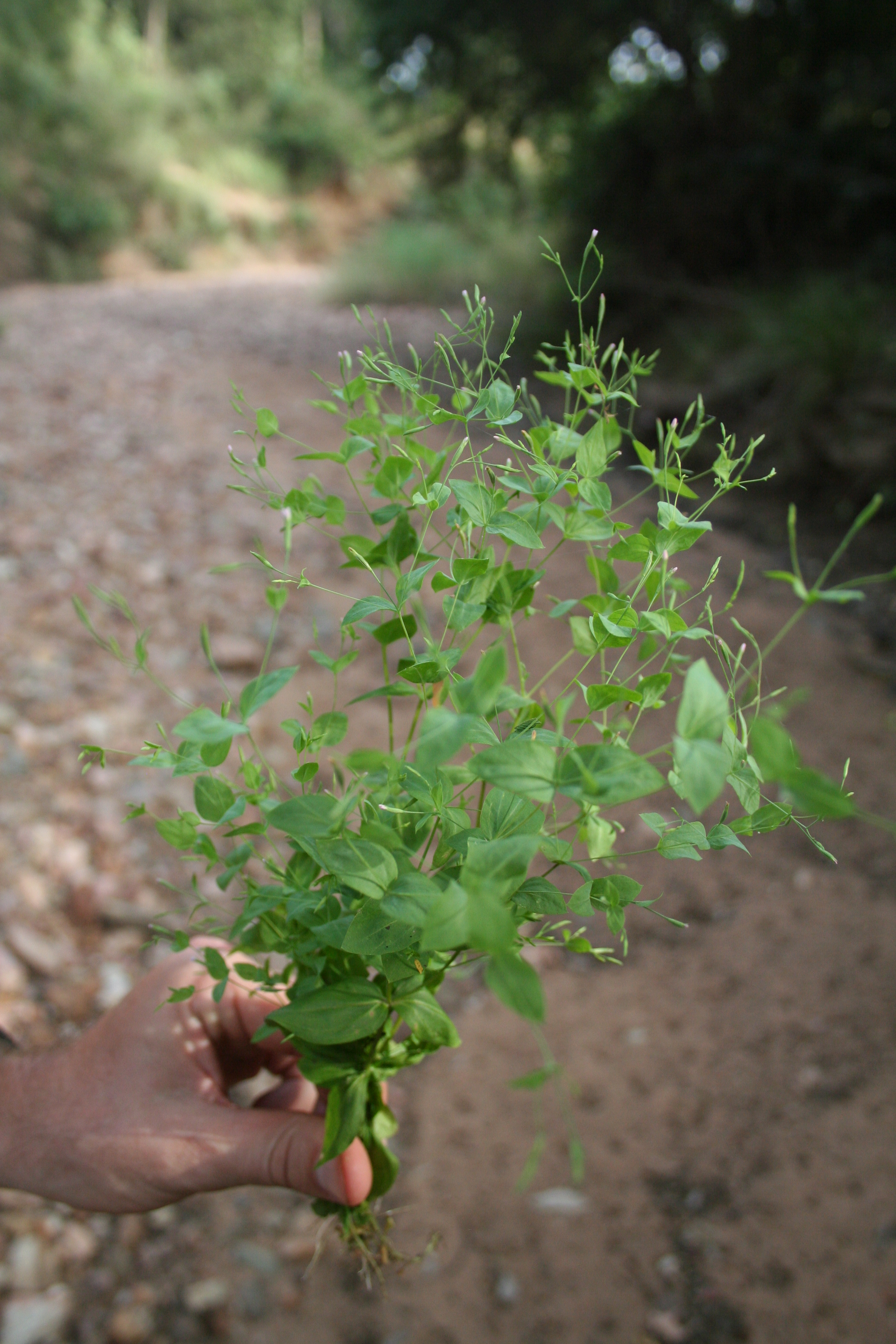
- Canscora diffusa from a riverbed in South East Burkina Faso

Scientific classification
- Kingdom: Plantae
- Clade: Tracheophytes
- Clade: Angiosperms
- Clade: Eudicots
- Clade: Asterids
- Order: Gentianales
- Family: Gentianaceae
- Genus: Canscora
- Species: C. diffusa

Binomial name
- Canscora diffusa (Vahl) R.Br. ex Roem. & Schult.

Synonyms
- Gentiana diffusa Vahl; Canscora kirkii N.E.Br. Orthostemon kirkii N.E.Br.

= Canscora diffusa =

Species of plant

Canscora diffusa is a plant species in the genus Canscora. Diffutidin and diffutin are flavans, a type of flavonoid, found in C. diffusa.

== See also ==
- List of Australian plant species authored by Robert Brown
