= 5,7,4'-Trimethoxyflavan =

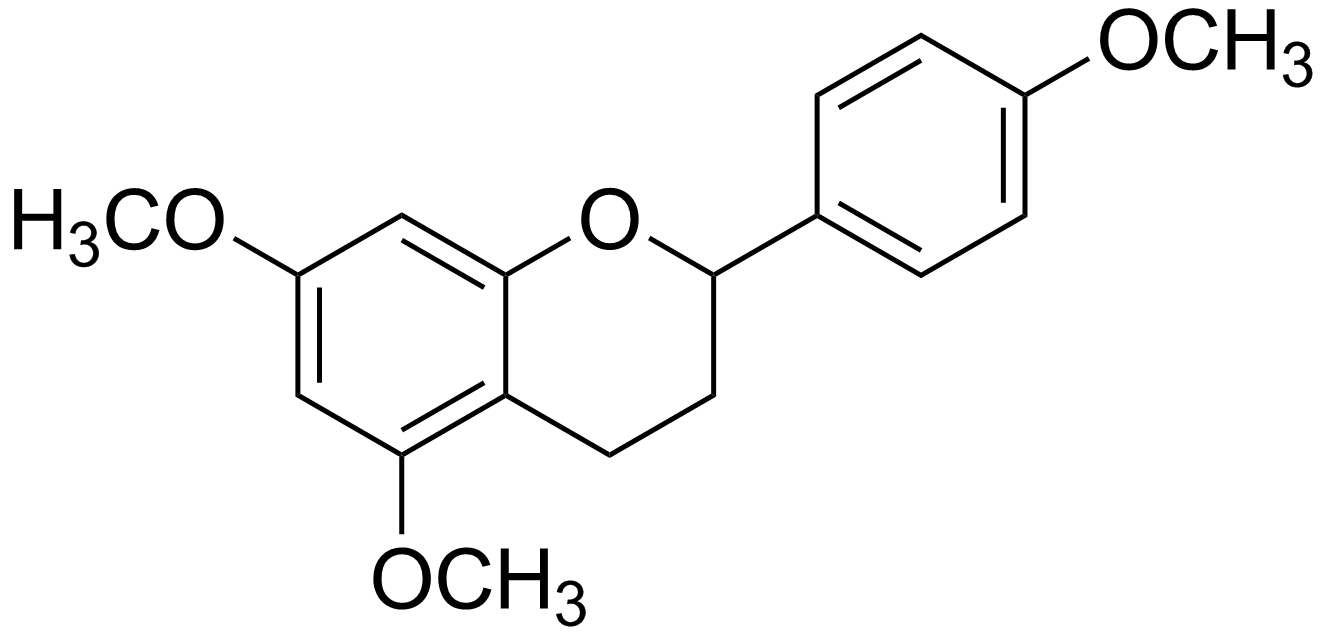

Names
- IUPAC name 4′,5,7-Trimethoxyflavan
- Systematic IUPAC name 5,7-Dimethoxy-2-(4-methoxyphenyl)-3,4-dihydro-2H-1-benzopyran

Identifiers
CAS Number	4225-32-5
3D model (JSmol)	Interactive image
ChemSpider	10554881
PubChem CID	21813969
UNII	XU599Q9S7C
CompTox Dashboard (EPA)	DTXSID70618333
- InChI: InChI=1S/C18H20O4/c1-19-13-6-4-12(5-7-13)16-9-8-15-17(21-3)10-14(20-2)11-18(15)22-16/h4-7,10-11,16H,8-9H2,1-3H3 Key: NODOVAFZWHOGIU-UHFFFAOYSA-N
- SMILES: c(C(C3)Oc(c2C3)cc(OC)cc2OC)(c1)ccc(OC)c1

Properties
Chemical formula	C_{18}H_{20}O_{4}
Molar mass	300.34 g/mol
- Except where otherwise noted, data are given for materials in their standard state (at 25 °C [77 °F], 100 kPa). verify (what is ?) Infobox references

5,7,4'-Trimethoxyflavan is a flavan, a type of flavonoid. It can be found in Xanthorrhoea preissii.
