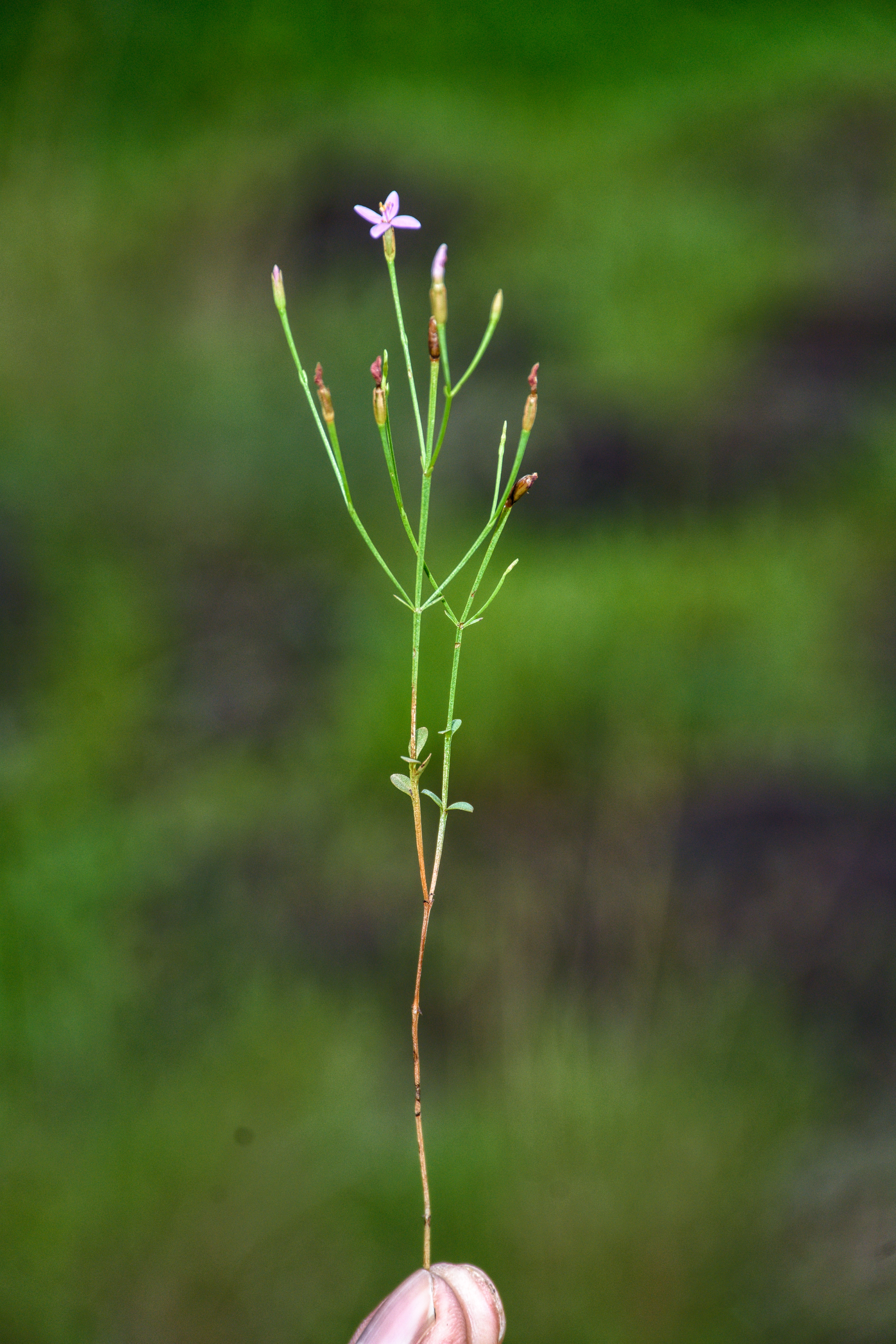
- Plant and flower from Karakkund

Scientific classification
- Kingdom: Plantae
- Clade: Tracheophytes
- Clade: Angiosperms
- Clade: Eudicots
- Clade: Asterids
- Order: Gentianales
- Family: Gentianaceae
- Genus: Canscora
- Species: C. bhatiana

Binomial name
- Canscora bhatiana K.S.Prasad & Raveendran

Synonyms
- Canscorinella bhatiana (K.S.Prasad & Raveendran) Shahina & Nampy

= Canscora bhatiana =

Species of plant

Canscora bhatiana is a flowering plant in the family Gentianaceae. It is named after Prof. K. Gopalakrishna Bhat, Department of Botany, Poornaprajna College, Udupi.

== Description ==
Grows up to 12-24 cm high and is apically branched with quadrangular stem. Upper leaves are considerably reduced and lower leaves are sessile. Pink flowers with 4-5 petals are pedicellate and appear in dichasial cyme inflorescence.

== Distribution ==
Canscora bhatiana grows in exposed laterite rocks in the lateritic hills of Northern Kerala in Peninsular India. Flowering and fruiting season is during August to October.
