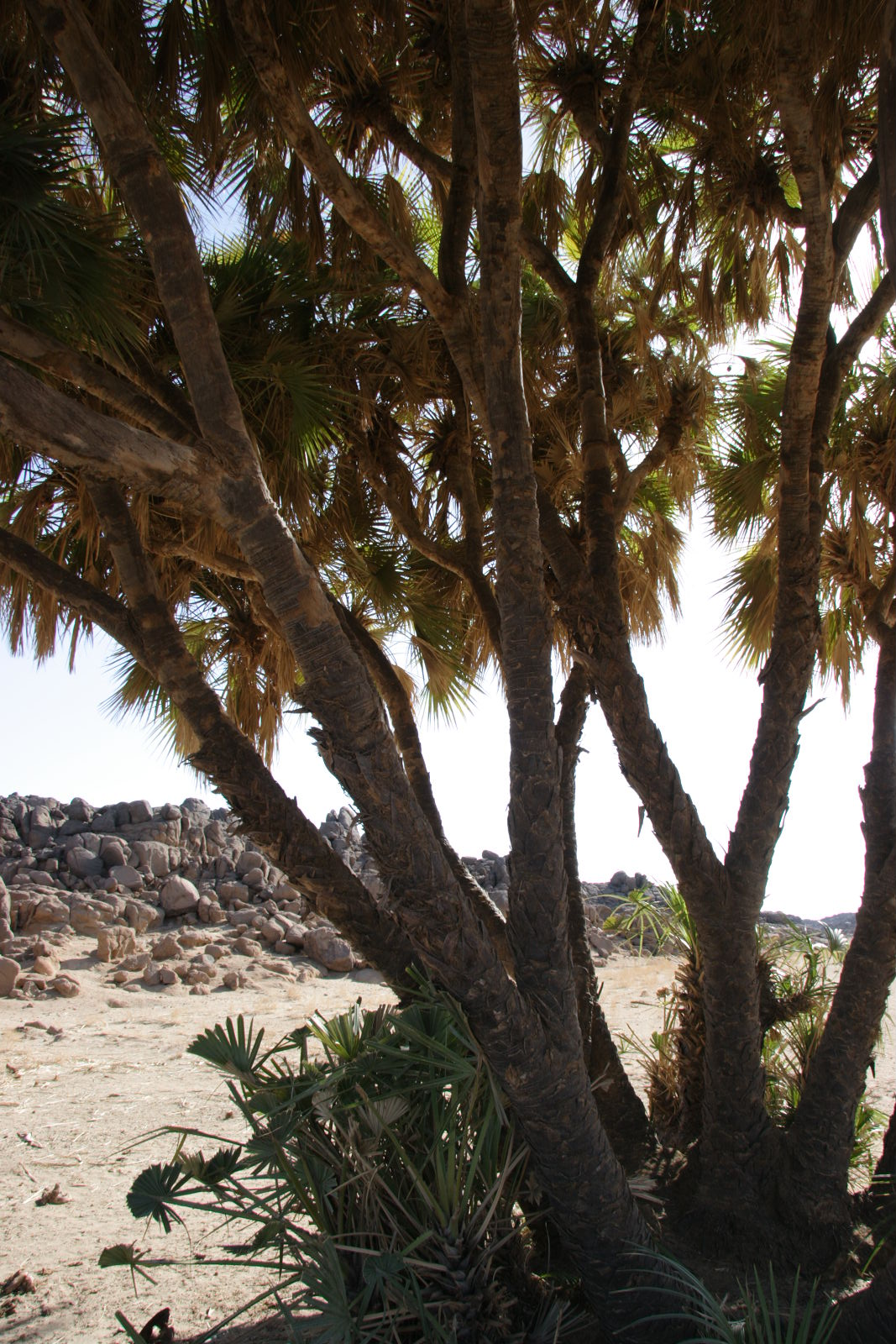
- Doum palm in Northern Sudan

Scientific classification
- Kingdom: Plantae
- Clade: Tracheophytes
- Clade: Angiosperms
- Clade: Monocots
- Clade: Commelinids
- Order: Arecales
- Family: Arecaceae
- Subfamily: Coryphoideae
- Tribe: Borasseae
- Genus: Hyphaene; Gaertn.

Species
- H. compressa H.Wendl.; H. coriacea Gaertn.; H. dichotoma (J.White Dubl.) Furtado; H. guineensis Schumach. & Thonn.; H. macrosperma H.Wendl.; H. petersiana Klotzsch ex. Mart.; H. reptans Becc.; H. thebaica (L.) Mart.

Synonyms
- Doma Lam.; Cucifera Delile; Douma Poir. in H.L.Duhamel du Monceau; Chamaeriphes Dill. ex Kuntze

= Hyphaene =

Genus of palm trees

Hyphaene is a genus of palms native to Africa, Madagascar, the Middle East, and the Indian subcontinent.

The genus includes the Doum palm (H. thebaica). They are unusual among palms in having regular naturally branched trunks; most other palms are single-stemmed from the ground. In Swahili, it is called koma.

== Species ==
- Hyphaene compressa H.Wendl. - eastern Africa from Ethiopia to Mozambique
- Hyphaene coriacea Gaertn. - eastern Africa from South Africa; Madagascar; Juan de Nova Island
- Hyphaene dichotoma (J.White Dubl. ex Nimmo) Furtado - India, Sri Lanka
- Hyphaene guineensis Schumach. & Thonn. - western and central Africa from Liberia to Angola
- Hyphaene macrosperma H.Wendl. - Benin
- Hyphaene petersiana Klotzsch ex Mart. - southern and eastern Africa from South Africa to Tanzania
- Hyphaene reptans Becc. - Somalia, Kenya, Yemen
- Hyphaene thebaica (L.) Mart. - northeastern, central and western Africa from Egypt to Somalia and west to Senegal and Mauritania; Middle East (Palestine, Israel, Saudi Arabia, Yemen)
