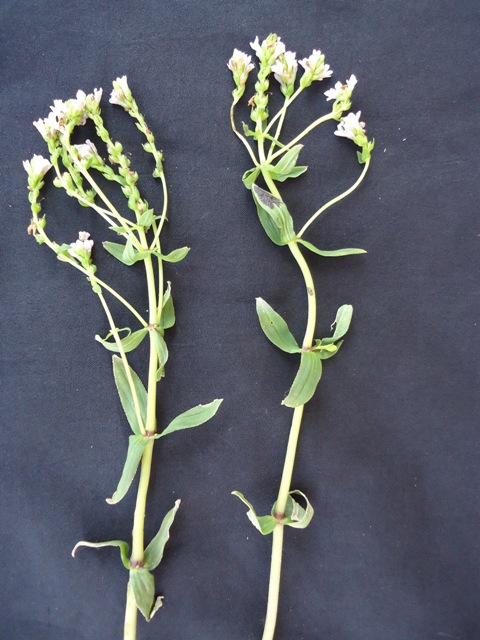
- Hoppea dichotoma

Scientific classification
- Kingdom: Plantae
- Clade: Tracheophytes
- Clade: Angiosperms
- Clade: Eudicots
- Clade: Asterids
- Order: Gentianales
- Family: Gentianaceae
- Tribe: Chironieae
- Subtribe: Canscorinae
- Genus: Hoppea; Rchb.

= Hoppea =

Genus of plants

Hoppea is a genus of plants in the family Gentianaceae. Species include:

- Hoppea dichotoma Willd.
- Hoppea fastigiata (Griseb.) C.B.Clarke
