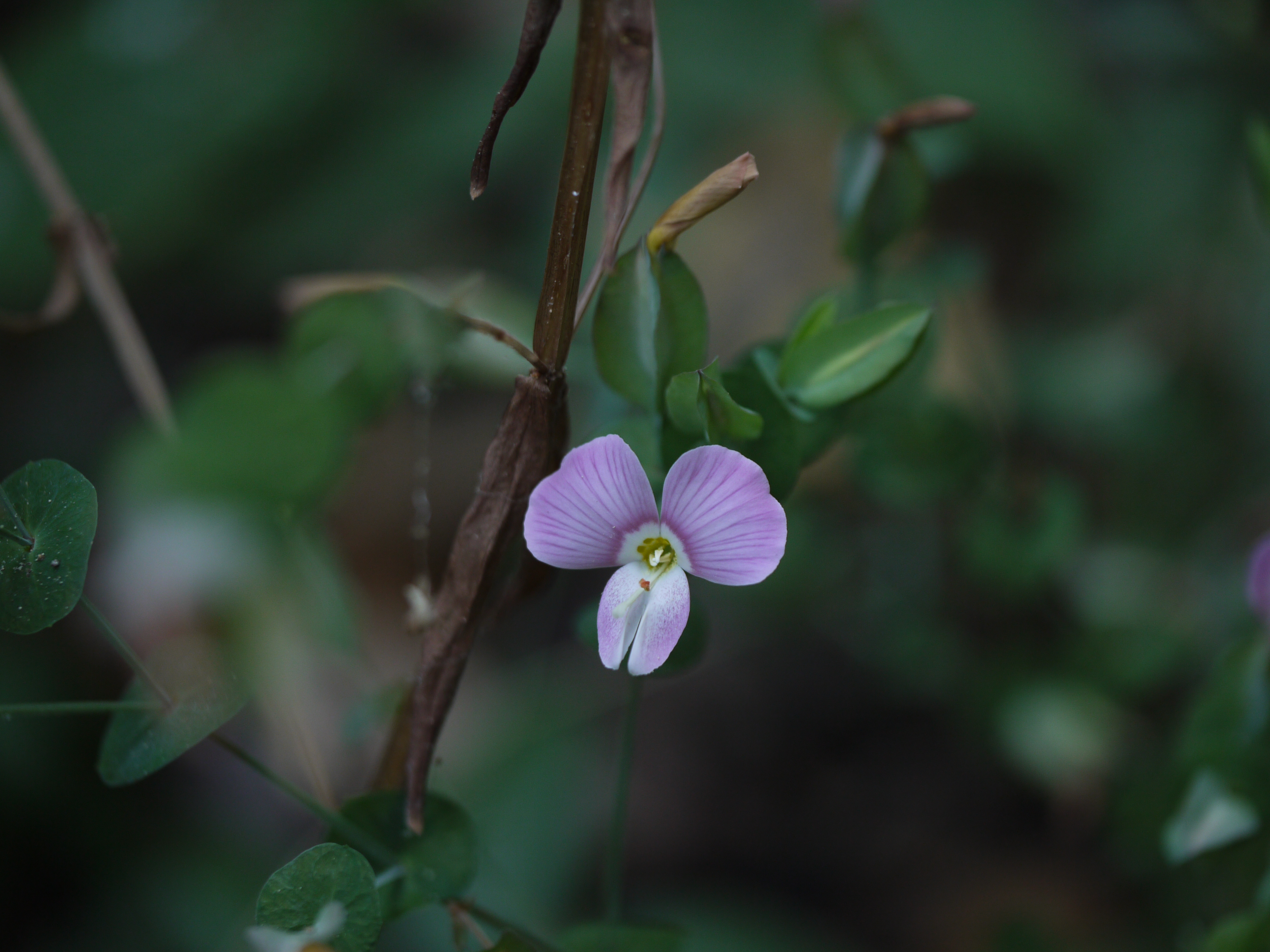

Scientific classification
- Kingdom: Plantae
- Clade: Tracheophytes
- Clade: Angiosperms
- Clade: Eudicots
- Clade: Asterids
- Order: Gentianales
- Family: Gentianaceae
- Genus: Canscora
- Species: C. perfoliata

Binomial name
- Canscora perfoliata Lam.

= Canscora perfoliata =

Species of plant

Canscora perfoliata, the pierced leaf canscora, is a herbaceous species of plant in the family Gentianaceae. It is endemic to the Western Ghats.

== Description ==
Canscora perfoliata is a small annual herb, 15–50 cm high. Stem is 4-winged. Oblong, lance shaped, sessile leaves are oppositely arranged. Upper leaves are nearly circular with stem piercing through them. Hence the common name pierced leaf canscora. Pink, four petal flowers appear in cyme. Flowering and fruiting season is November to February.
