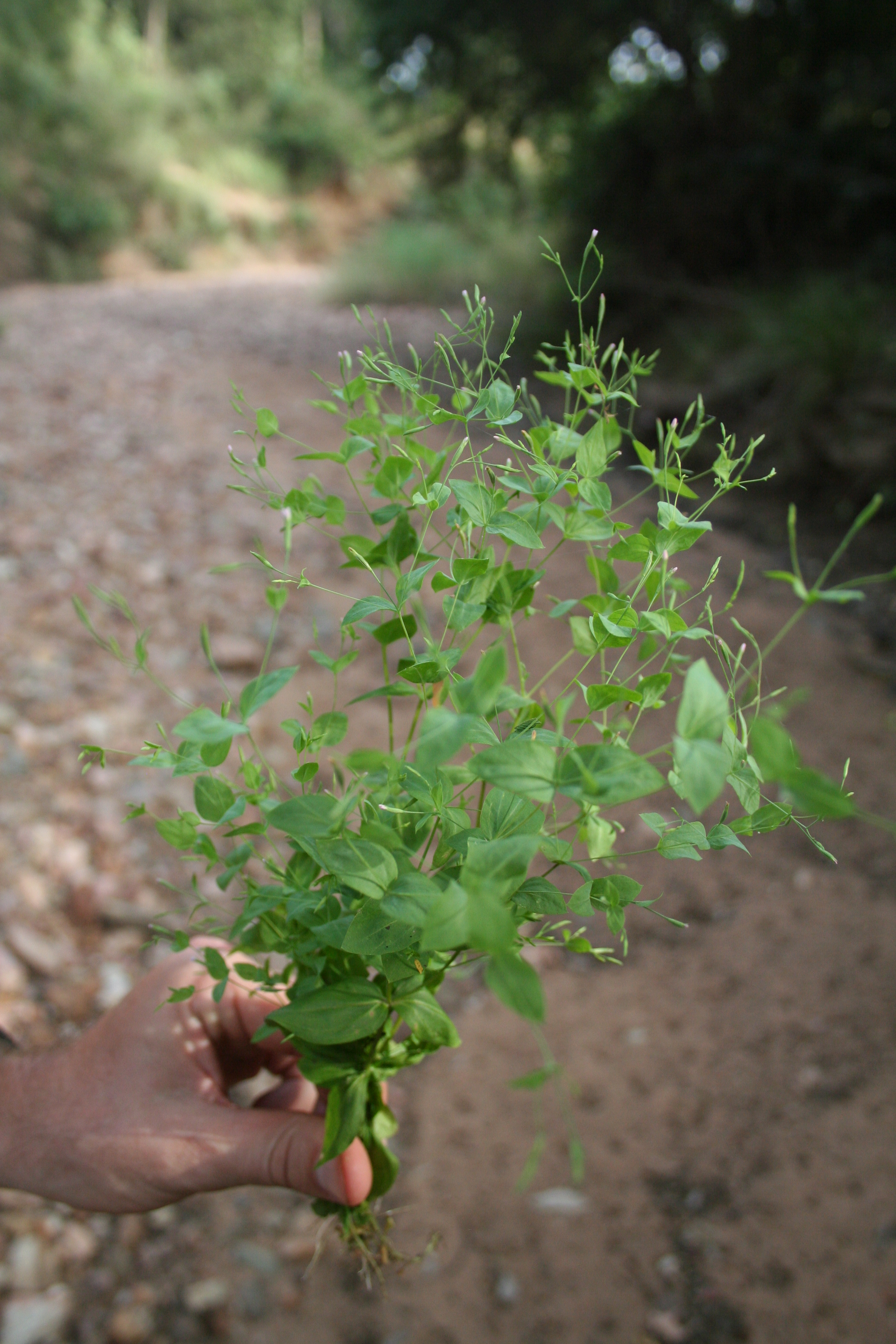
- Canscora diffusa

Scientific classification
- Kingdom: Plantae
- Clade: Tracheophytes
- Clade: Angiosperms
- Clade: Eudicots
- Clade: Asterids
- Order: Gentianales
- Family: Gentianaceae
- Tribe: Chironieae
- Subtribe: Canscorinae
- Genus: Canscora; Lam.

Species
- See text

Synonyms
- Pladera Sol. ex Roxb.; Canscorinella Shahina & Nampy; Centaurium Borkh.; Cobamba Blanco; Heterocanscora C.B.Clarke; Orthostemon R.Br.; Pootia Dennst.

= Canscora =

Genus of plants

Canscora is a genus 9 to 30 species of plants in the family Gentianaceae. Canscora is native to Africa, Asia and Australia. Some species are used medicinally.

== Species ==
Species accepted by the Plants of the World Online as of November 2022:

- Canscora alata (Roth) Wall.
- Canscora andrographioides Griff. ex C.B.Clarke
- Canscora bhatiana K.S.Prasad & Raveendran
- Canscora bidoupensis Hul
- Canscora ciathula Aver.
- Canscora concanensis C.B.Clarke
- Canscora diffusa (Vahl) R.Br. ex Roem. & Schult.
- Canscora heteroclita (L.) Gilg
- Canscora macrocalyx Miq.
- Canscora pauciflora Dalzell
- Canscora perfoliata Lam.
- Canscora roxburghii Arn. ex Miq.
- Canscora schultesii Wall. ex Griseb.
- Canscora shrirangiana Kambale, Kolte & A.Deshp.
- Canscora stricta Sedgw.
- Canscora tetraptera (Naik & Pokle) Arun Pr. & Sardesai
