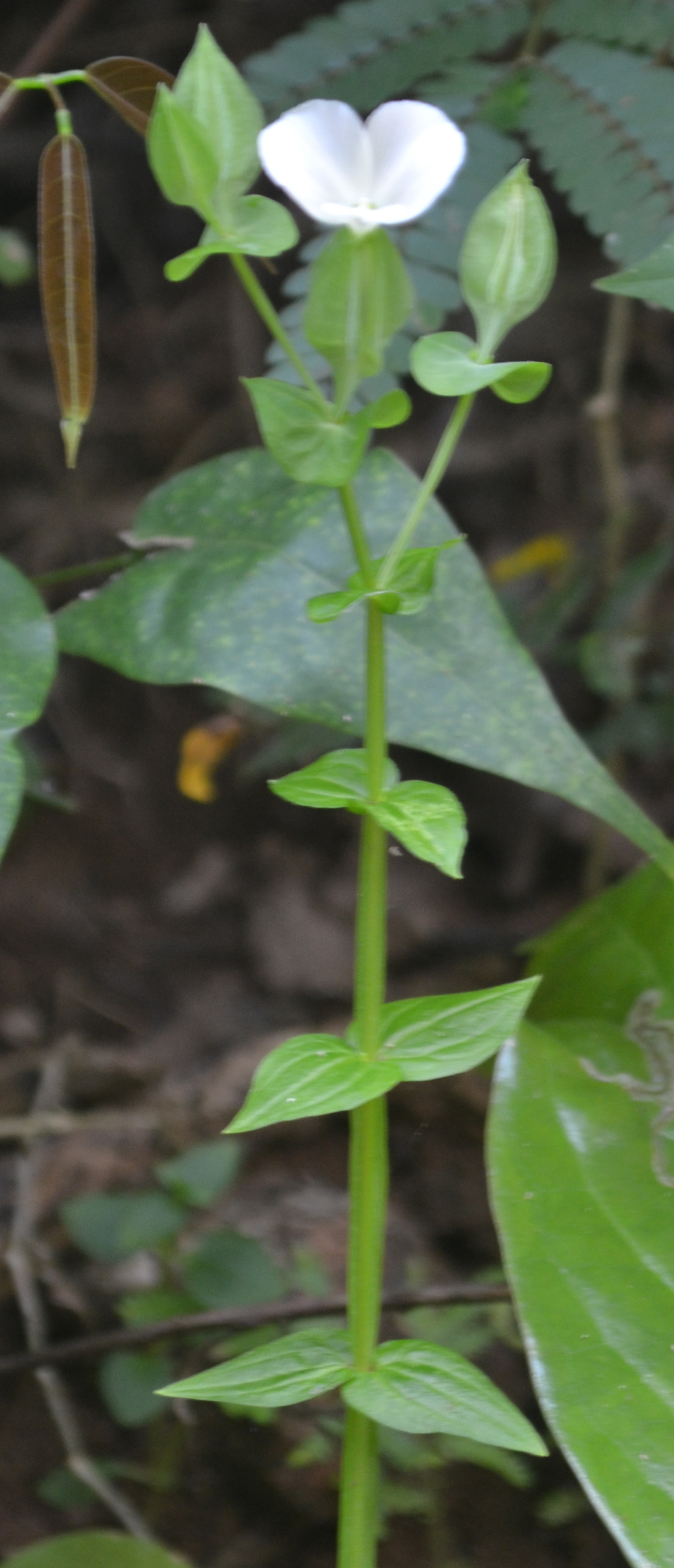
- Plant and flower from Kannavam forest.

Scientific classification
- Kingdom: Plantae
- Clade: Embryophytes
- Clade: Tracheophytes
- Clade: Angiosperms
- Clade: Eudicots
- Clade: Asterids
- Order: Gentianales
- Family: Gentianaceae
- Genus: Canscora
- Species: C. alata

Binomial name
- Canscora alata (Roth) Wall.

Synonyms
- Canscora decussata (Roxb.) Schult. & Schult.f.; Cobamba blancoi Blanco; Exacum alatum Roth ex Roem. & Schult.; Pladera decussata Roxb.

= Canscora alata =

Species of flowering plant

Canscora alata is a herbaceous species of plant in the family Gentianaceae, with a self-supporting growth habit. It is commonly known as samgamoli, kanjenkora, sangupushpi, sangupushpi, kanjenkora and samgamoli. It is growing in moist deciduous forests, also in the plains. it is widely distributed in tropical Africa and South Asia.

== Description ==
Canscora alata is an erect herbs to 35 cm high; stem narrowly 4-winged. Leaves are 1.5-2.5 x 0.8-1.5 cm, elliptic-lanceolate, base rounded, apex acute, 3-nerved at base, subsessile. Cymes dichasial, axillary or terminal; pedicel 1-1.5 cm long, winged. Flowering and fruiting are from November to December. Seeds are angular.

== Uses ==
As an ayurvedic herb, Canscora alata is used for various diseases.
