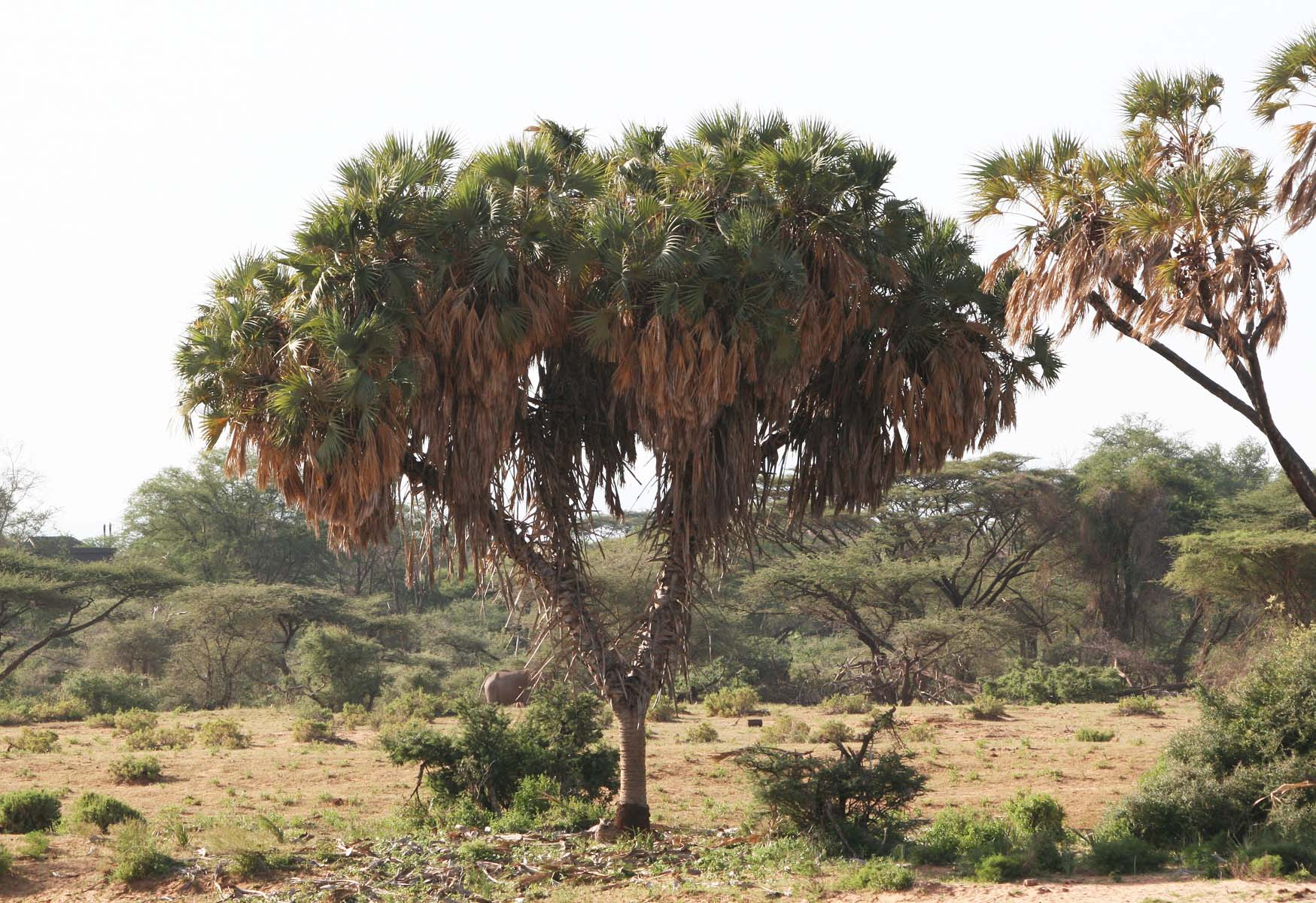

Conservation status
- Least Concern (IUCN 3.1)

Scientific classification
- Kingdom: Plantae
- Clade: Tracheophytes
- Clade: Angiosperms
- Clade: Monocots
- Clade: Commelinids
- Order: Arecales
- Family: Arecaceae
- Genus: Hyphaene
- Species: H. compressa

Binomial name
- Hyphaene compressa H.Wendl.

Synonyms
- Chamaeriphes compressa (H.Wendl.) Kuntze; Hyphaene benadirensis Becc.; Hyphaene incoje Furtado; Hyphaene kilvaensis (Becc.) Furtado; Hyphaene mangoides Becc.; Hyphaene megacarpa Furtado; Hyphaene multiformis Becc.; Hyphaene semiplaena (Becc.) Furtado

= Hyphaene compressa =

Species of palm tree

Hyphaene compressa, also known as the East African doum palm, is a palm tree (family Palmae or Arecaceae) in the genus Hyphaene. It is a tree known for its unique dichotomous branching, unlike most palms which are not branched. This palm tree is abundant in Eastern Africa and is a vital socioeconomic resource to the rural pastoralist and agro-pastoralists there.

== Distribution ==
There is a high concentration of Hyphaene compressa along the coasts of northern East Africa, particularly Kenya and Tanzania. Additional countries with a high distribution include Somalia, Madagascar and Ethiopia. The palm also occurs to a lesser extent towards the Arabian Peninsula and India. The Doum Palm is densely concentrated around lakes and river ecosystems of the Turkana Valley and surrounding National Parks in Kenya.

The East African doum palm has been introduced into the United States for its horticultural interest.

== Habitat and ecology ==
Hyphaene compressa is found in hot and dry climates. It flourishes in tropical and subtropical regions with temperatures ranging between 36 and 38 °Celsius. The trees are adapted to semi-arid to arid climates with a low annual rainfall of 150 to 600 mm. The trees obtain water by using high water tables which the trees taproots can access. Hyphaene compressa thrives in direct light in open grasslands and along edges of lakes, swamps, rivers and oceans. The doum palm tolerates soils that are salty, calcareous and alkaline (pH 9) and of general poor quality. Doum palm is a woody dioecious tree that is slow growing and long living. Some trees can grow to be 100 years old, but because of high human interference, few survive much more than 30 years.

== Description ==
Hyphaene compressa is a robust tree that stands erect, growing to about 10–20 m (33–66 ft) in height. The tree can be said to be fairly fire resistant and drought resistant. It is considered difficult to destroy, because it grows bulbs and deep taproots underground that will allow the tree to regrow if it is damaged above ground. Individuals of this species are dichotomously branched and the stems may branch about five times by full maturity. or as many as six times, producing sixty-four heads of fronds on a tree up to 20 metres in height and a diameter at breast height (DBH) of up to 40 cm. Little is known about the dichotomous venation, the only other genera of palms to naturally exhibit this trait are Dypsis, Korthalsia and Laccosperma. The leaves are medium to large sized palmate or fan shaped and emerge at the top of the tree in small crowns. The spiny leaf stalks and the fruit develop at the base of these crowns.

== Fruit and reproduction ==
The fruit of Hyphaene compressa (also called Gingerbread Palm) is produced after 30 years of maturation, and can be harvested regularly every 6 months when the tree is between 40 and 50 years old. The fruit is a drupe and grows almost all year round, taking three to ten months to germinate. Hyphaene compressa fruit is eaten by elephants, baboons, and monkeys (including the endangered Tana River red colobus). Elephants favour eating the Doum palm fruit and have become the major mechanism for its seed dispersal. The fruit is edible for humans and are highly packed with energy. When ripe the fruit appears orange-brown and tastes sweet. The doum palm can produce up to thousands of fruit per tree, each fruit growing 6–12 cm long and 4–9 cm wide.

== Usage of tree ==
Almost all of the East African doum palm can be utilised, the most highly used part of the tree being its leaves. Hyphaene compressa has a variety of different uses and is a vital economic resource in rural African communities.

=== Leaves ===
The age the palm leaves are harvested dictate what goods are produced. The stalks of immature palm leaves are split into long strips to make a variety of products such as baskets, mats, chairs, brooms and hats. The leaves can also be beaten and separated into fibres to make hammocks. Mature green leaves are dried and used to cover the roofs of huts, make fire and to also create weaved goods. The uses for these leaves as shelter have expanded to include tourist sites and refugee camps and also with the increase in more permanent settlements in African communities.

=== Fruit ===
The people of Eastern Africa depend on the fruit from the doum palm in different ways. It is popular as a food source, more so during times of food shortage, and is commonly bought and sold in local markets The mesocarp or pulp of the young fruit can be made into a non-alcoholic juice drink which children enjoy. The seed coat within the mesocarp is hard to crack, but the nut inside can be eaten or crushed into a powder to flavour other food items.

=== Stems ===
By incising the stems of older trees, its sap can be made into an alcoholic palm wine of about 3.6 % volume. This practice is often performed incorrectly by cutting into the stem too deeply, which kills the tree. If the sap is extracted correctly, the tree can be harvested from again in two years. The wines 24 hour expiration time and lack of investment into preservation has stopped it from being economically important. The trunks before the first branching can be made into very sturdy, termite proof building material that includes poles, fences and latrines. Although the related coconut palm Cocos nucifera has been very popular as an exported building good, the doum palm is claimed to be sturdier because of its higher density timber.

=== Additional names ===
The East African doum palm has many different names in native African languages. Boni (Medi); Chonyi (Mkoma); Digo (Mkoma lume); Gabra (Meetti); Giriama (Mlala); Kamba (Mukoma); Kambe (Mkoma); Mbeere (Irara); Orma (Kone); Pokomo (Mkoma); Pokot (Tangayiween); Rendile (Baar); Samburu (Iparwa); Sanya (Auwaki); Somali (Baar); Swahili (Mkoma, Mlala); Taveta (Irara); Tharaka (Muruguyu); Turkana (Eeng'ol)

== Socioeconomic importance ==
The presence of the doum palm has increased living standards in rural communities in which the fruit, leaves and stems are monetarily valuable. Weaved products are sold and traded at local and international markets where extreme specificity of skill and craftsmanship can be seen. Subsequently, the marketing and distribution of thatched products creates a niche that requires retailers, wholesales and of course local manufacturers that understand the changing local market. For example, in Turkana, a women's co-operative society has emerged to handle the sales of crafts. Although doum palm has created a source of income for local peoples, its economy is not stable or uniform throughout the region. Availability to Hyphaene compressa, ability to effectively use its product and skills of the regional people are all limiting factors.

== Conservation ==
Due to the high importance of doum palm, poaching of its leaves in protected National Forests has become an issue. There has been evidence since the 1990s of overexploitation of the trees resources. Improper sap collection practices kill palm trees, and lack of knowledge on how to perform extraction is limiting the palm's longevity. Hyphaene compressa is in the process of being domesticated in some regions in Africa. Conservation laws to protect the tree from being overexploited have also been locally established as to ensure there is a lasting abundance of the doum palm.

== Gallery ==
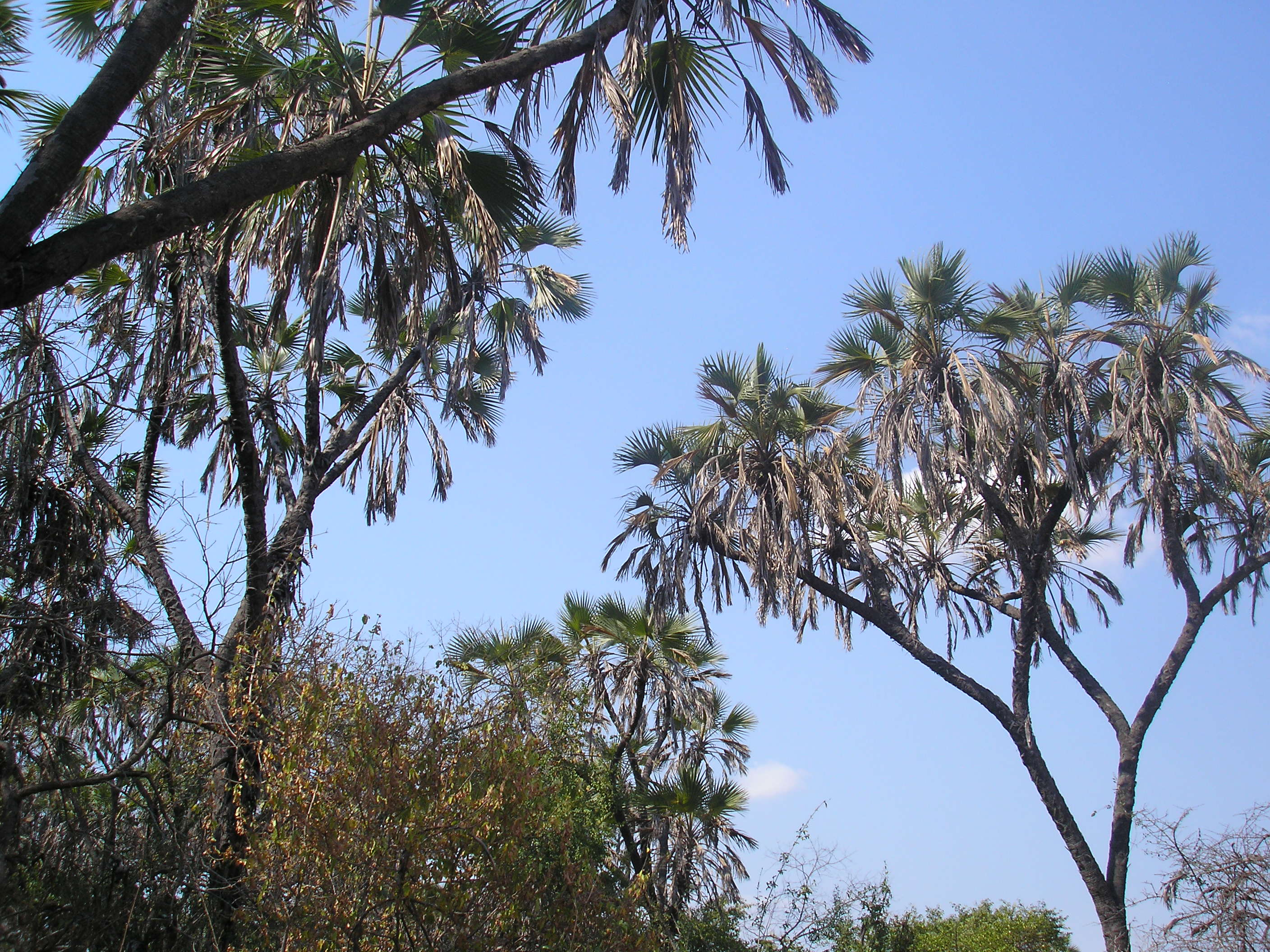
Hyphaene compressa at Selous Game Reserve

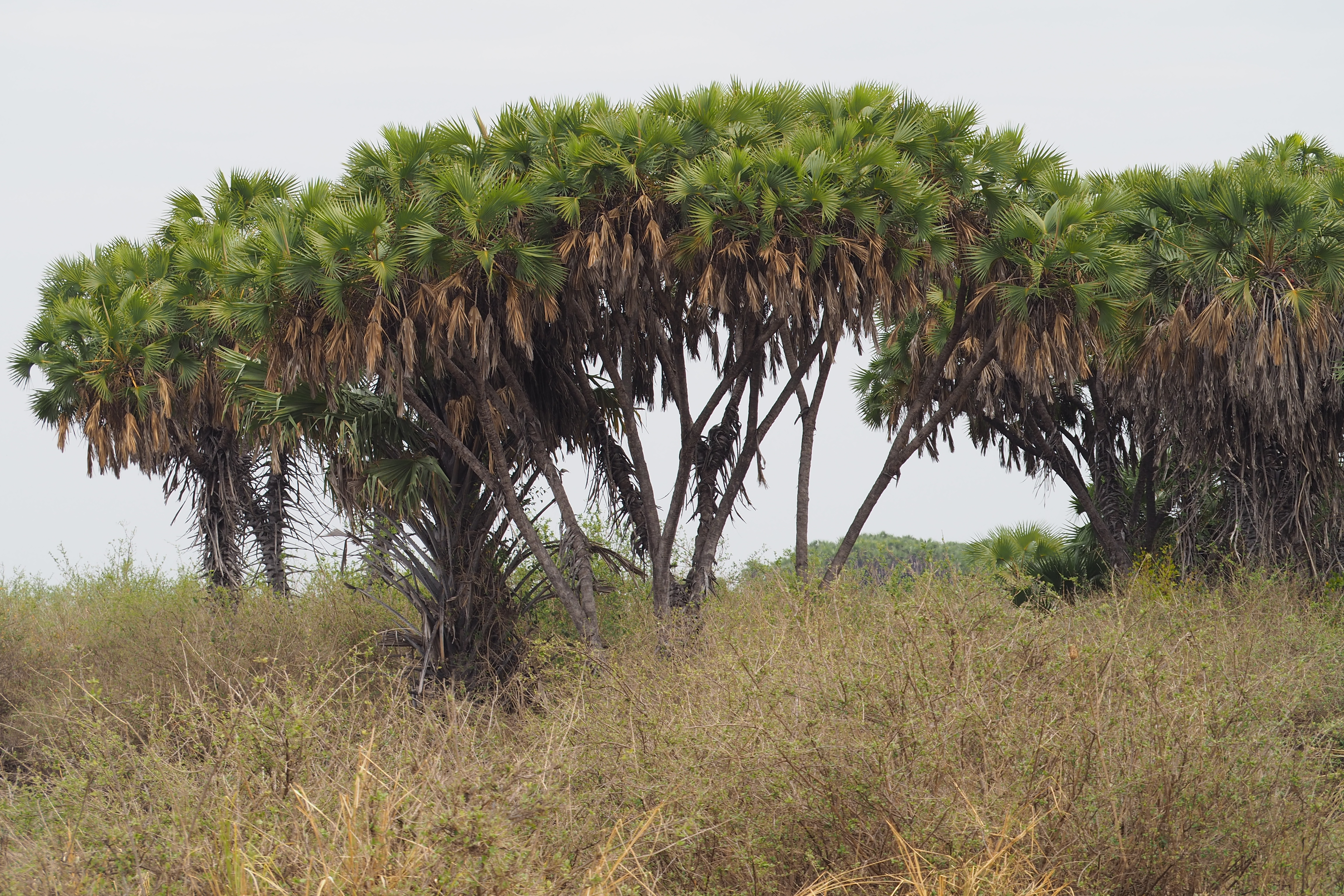
Noticeable branching

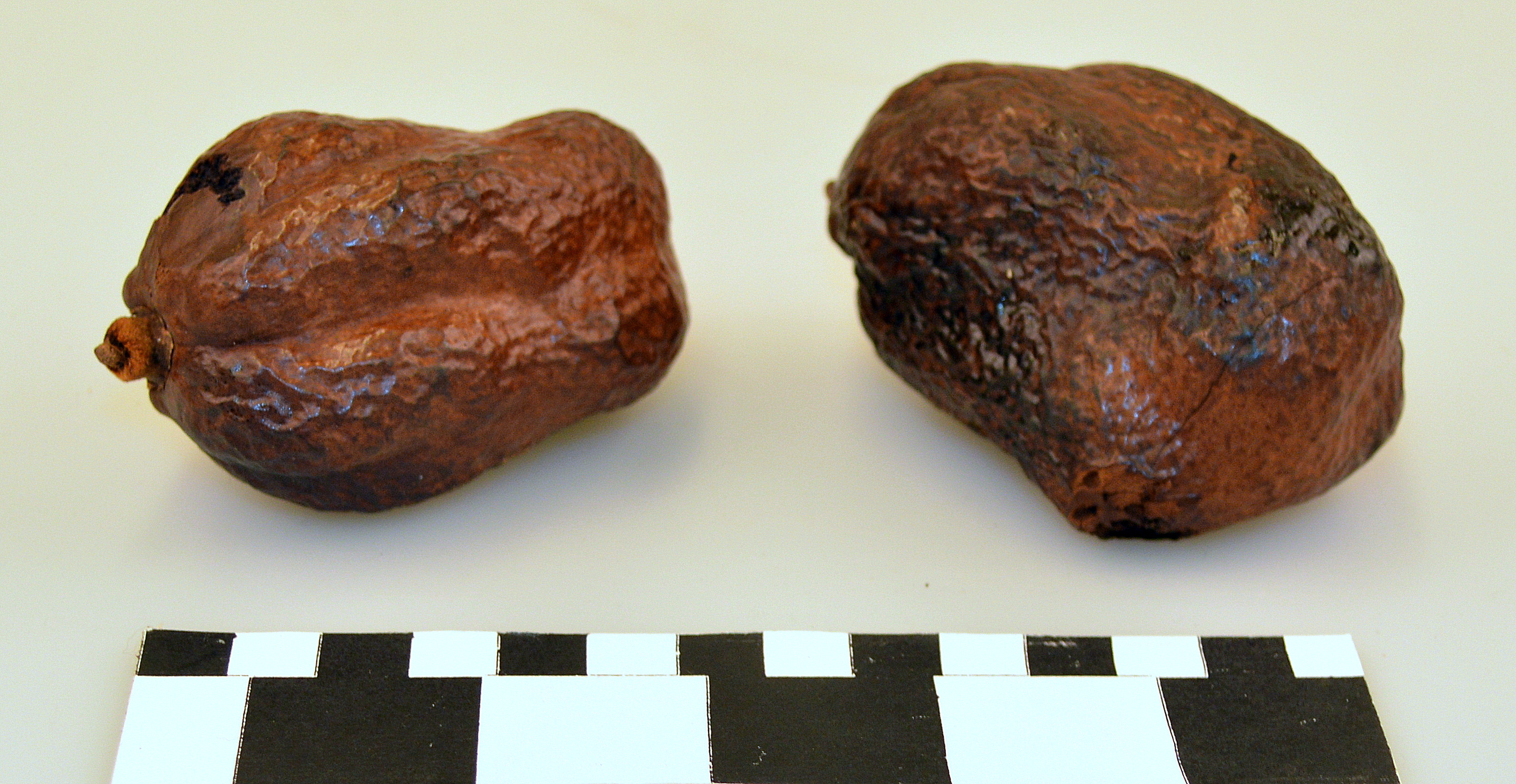
The seeds

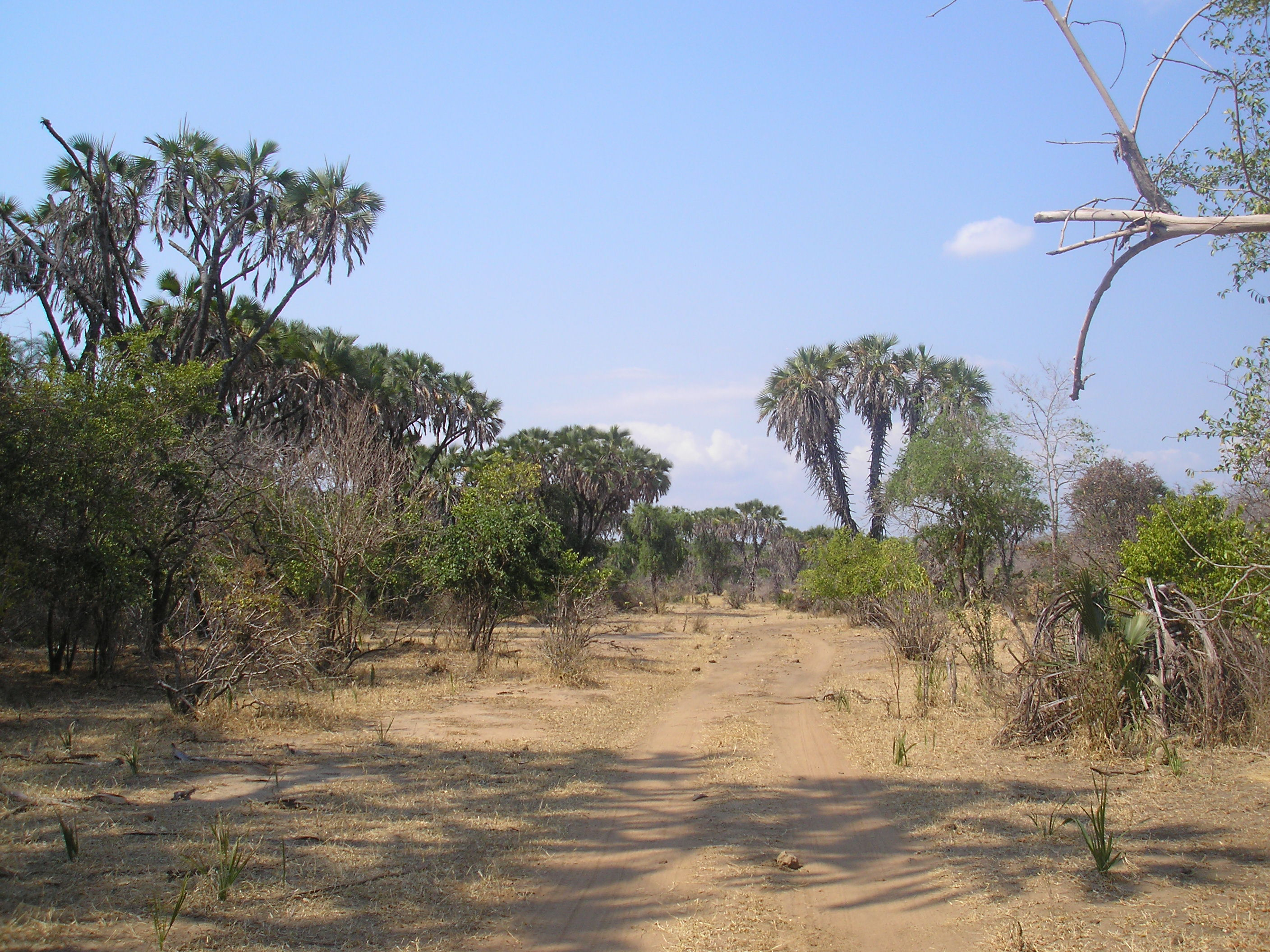
Typical savannah environment

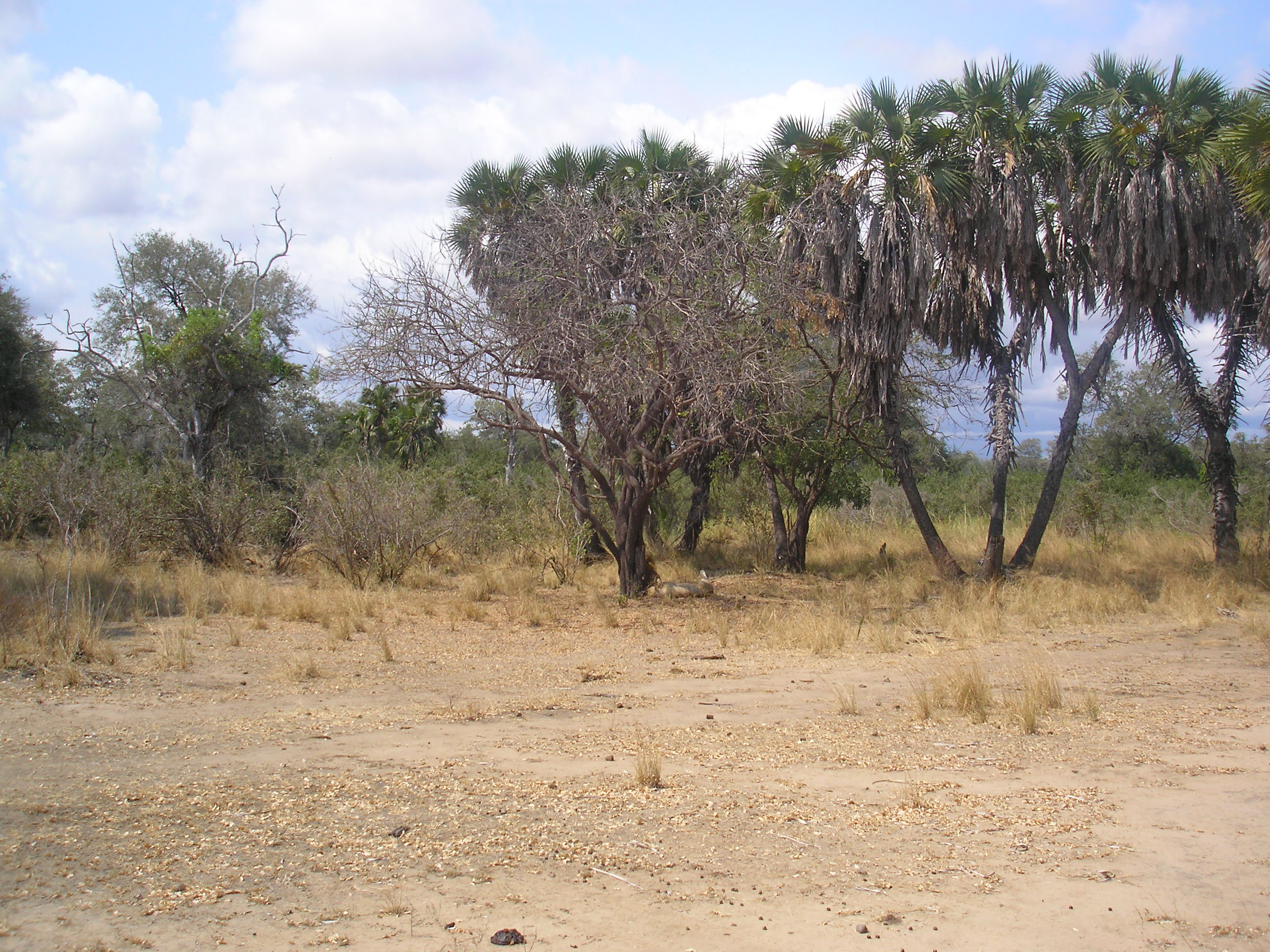
Lions lying in the shade of this palm
