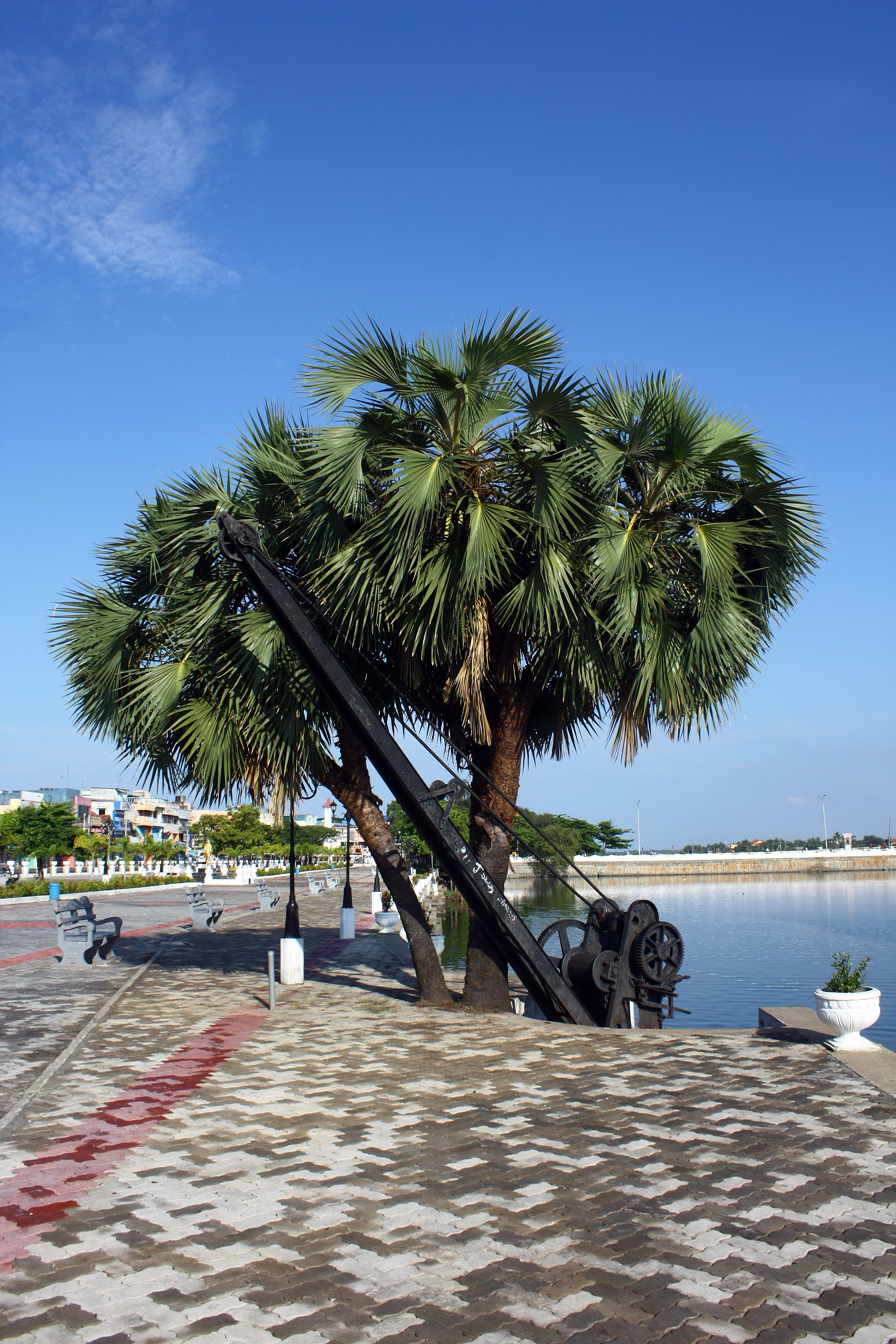
- Doum Palm in Batticaloa, Sri Lanka

Conservation status
- Least Concern (IUCN 3.1)

Scientific classification
- Kingdom: Plantae
- Clade: Tracheophytes
- Clade: Angiosperms
- Clade: Monocots
- Clade: Commelinids
- Order: Arecales
- Family: Arecaceae
- Genus: Hyphaene
- Species: H. thebaica

Binomial name
- Hyphaene thebaica (L.) Mart.

= Hyphaene thebaica =

Species of plant

Hyphaene thebaica, with common names doum palm (Arabic: دوم) and gingerbread tree (also mistakenly doom palm), is a type of palm tree with edible oval fruit. It is native to the Arabian Peninsula and also to the northern half and western part of Africa where it is widely distributed and tends to grow in places where groundwater is present.

== Description ==
The doum palm is a dioecious palm and grows up to 17 m (56 ft) high. The trunk, which can have a girth of up to 90 cm (35 in), branches dichotomously and has tufts of large leaves at the ends of the branches. The bark is fairly smooth, dark grey and bears the scars of fallen leaves. The petioles (leaf stalks) are about a metre long, sheathing the branch at the base and armed with stout upward-curving claws. The leaves are fan shaped and measure about 120 by 180 cm (47 by 71 in). Male and female flowers are produced on separate trees. The inflorescences are similar in general appearance, up to about 1.2 m (3 ft 11 in) long, branching irregularly and with two or three spikes arising from each branchlet. Female trees produce large woody fruits, each containing a single seed, that remain on the tree for a long period.

== Distribution and habitat ==
The doum palm is native to the northern half of Africa. It is widespread in the Sahel and grows from Mauritania and Senegal in the west, through Central Africa, and east to Egypt, Kenya, Somalia and Tanzania. It tends to grow in areas where groundwater is present and is found along the Nile River in Egypt and Sudan, in riverine areas of northwestern Kenya, and along the Niger River in West Africa. It is also native to the Levant and the Arabian Peninsula (Palestine, Sinai, Yemen and Saudi Arabia) and is reportedly naturalized in the Netherlands Antilles in the Caribbean. It grows in wadis and at oases, but sometimes occurs away from water and on rocky hillsides. It dislikes waterlogged soils and is very resistant to destruction by bushfires.

== Uses ==
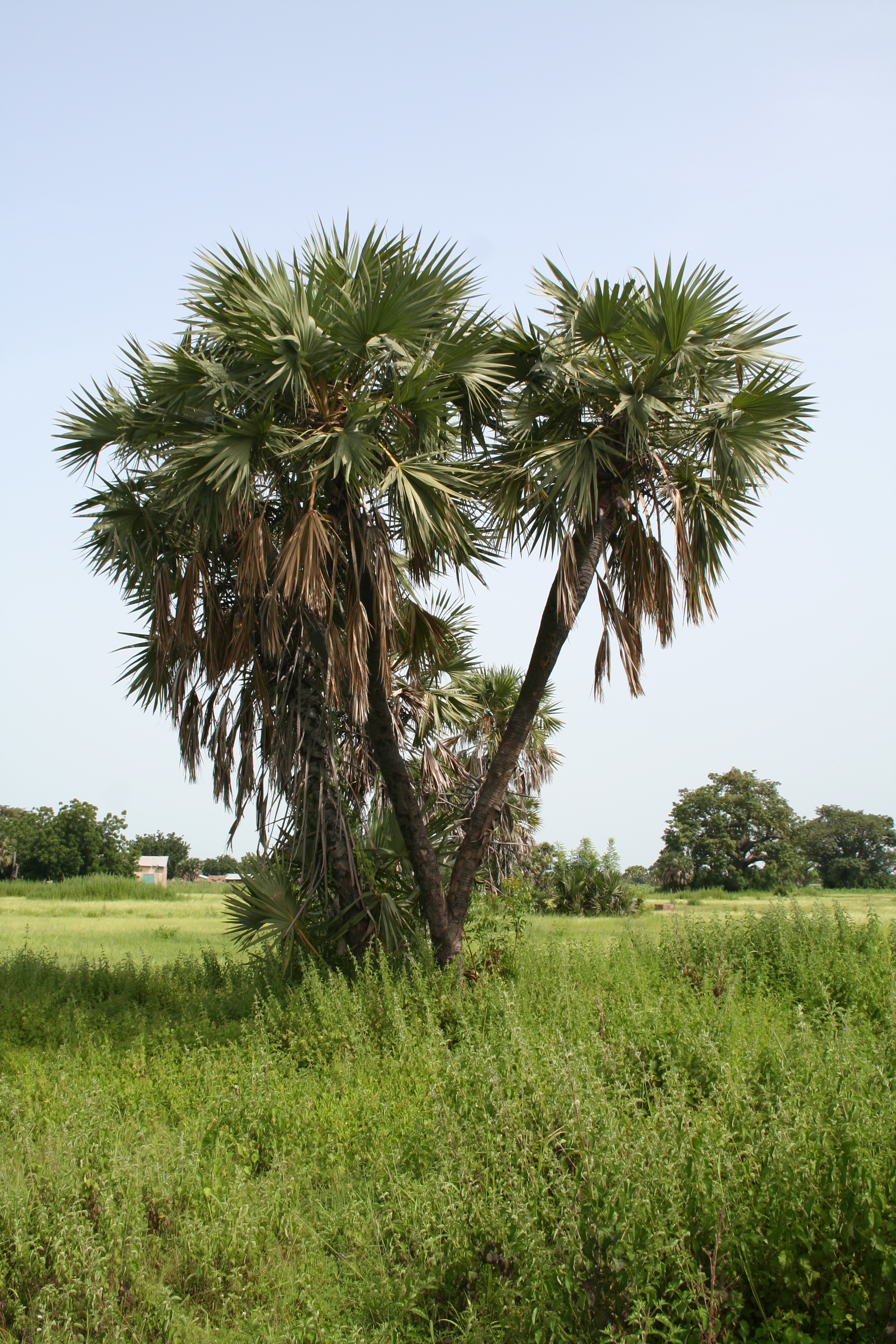
Doum palm in Benin

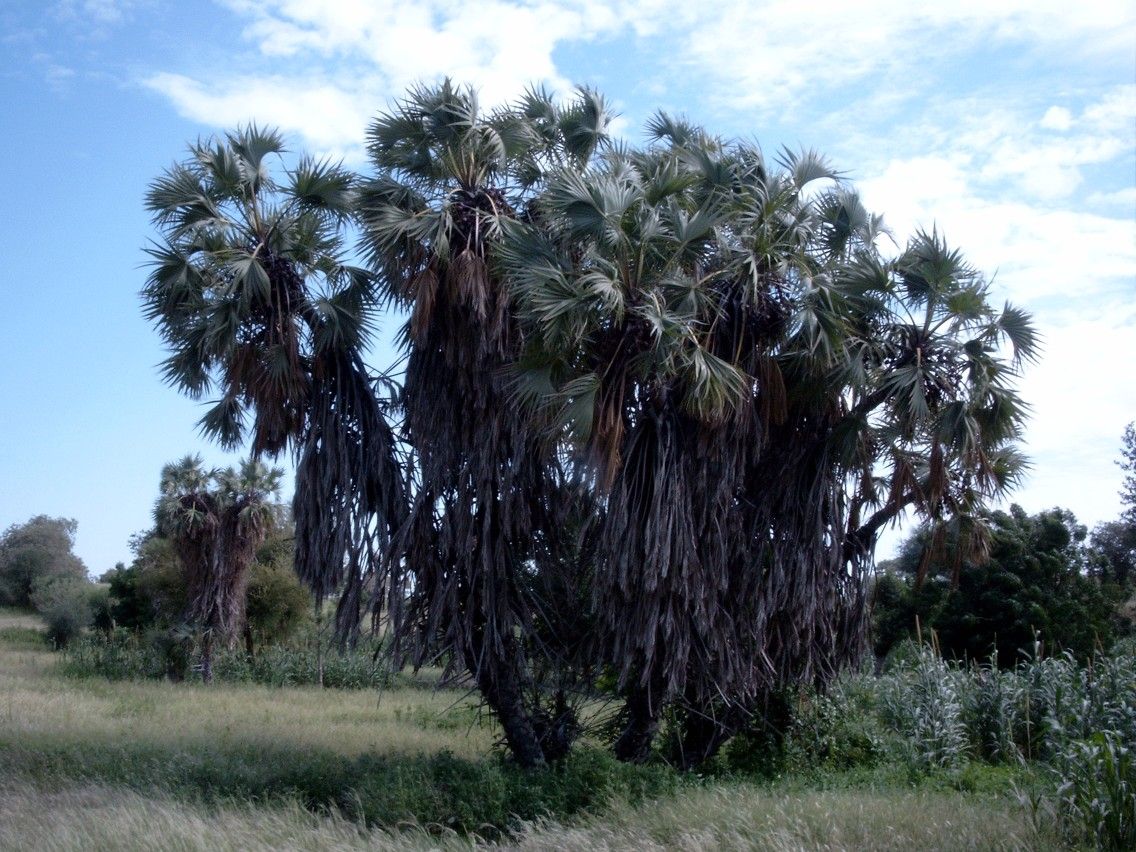
Doum palm in Burkina Faso

Harvested by-products

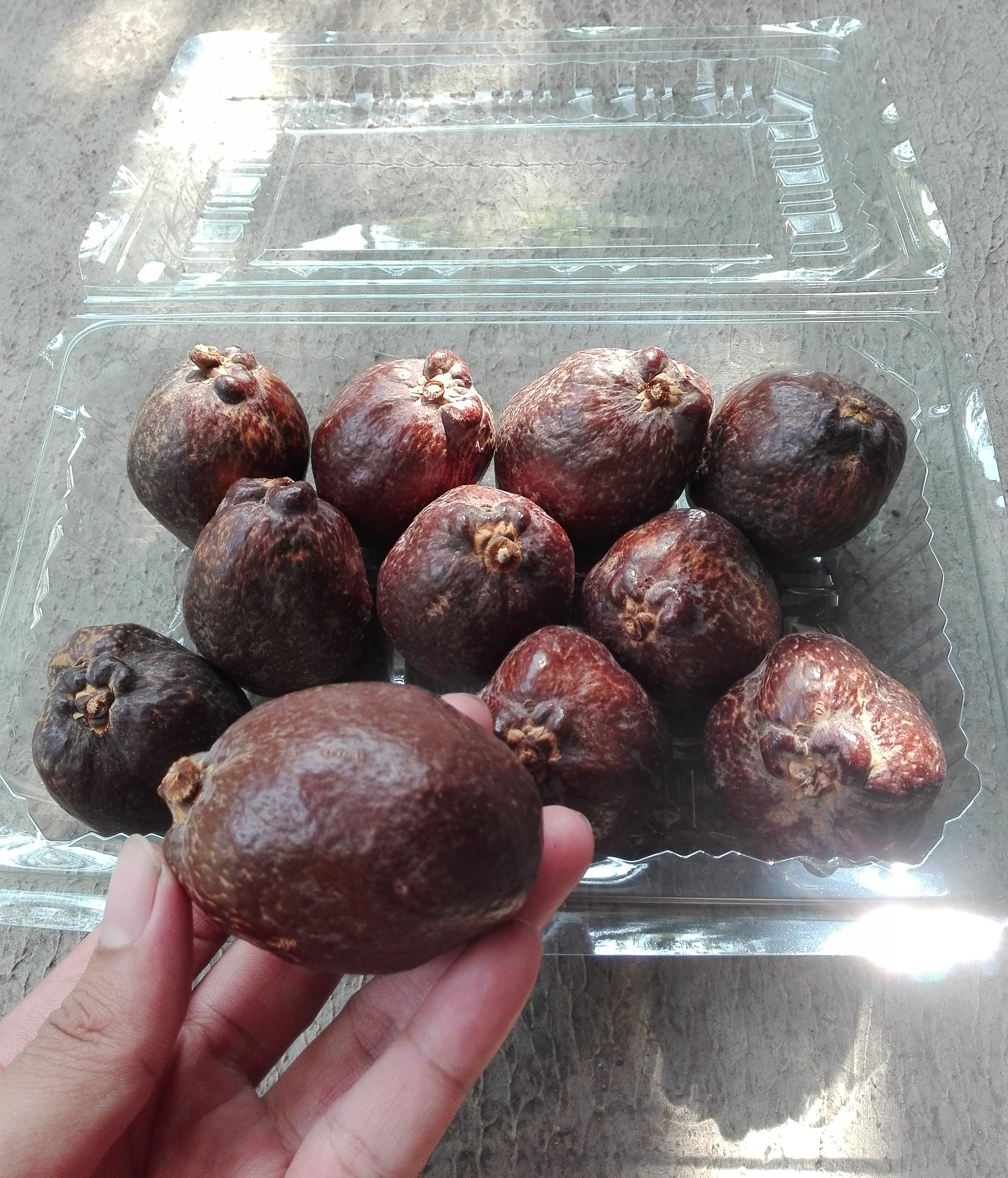
Fruits harvested in Madinah

The doum palm flourishes in hot dry regions where little else grows and the tree is appreciated for the shade it provides. All parts of the tree are useful, but probably the most important product is the leaves. The fibre and leaflets are used by people along the Niger and Nile Rivers to weave baskets, such as in the material culture of the Manasir, mats, coarse textiles, brooms, ropes, string and thatch. The timber is used for posts and poles, furniture manufacture and beehives, and the tree provides wood for fuel. The leaf stalks are used for fencing and the fibre is used for textiles. Other products include fishing rafts, brooms, hammocks, carpets, buttons and beads.

=== Food ===
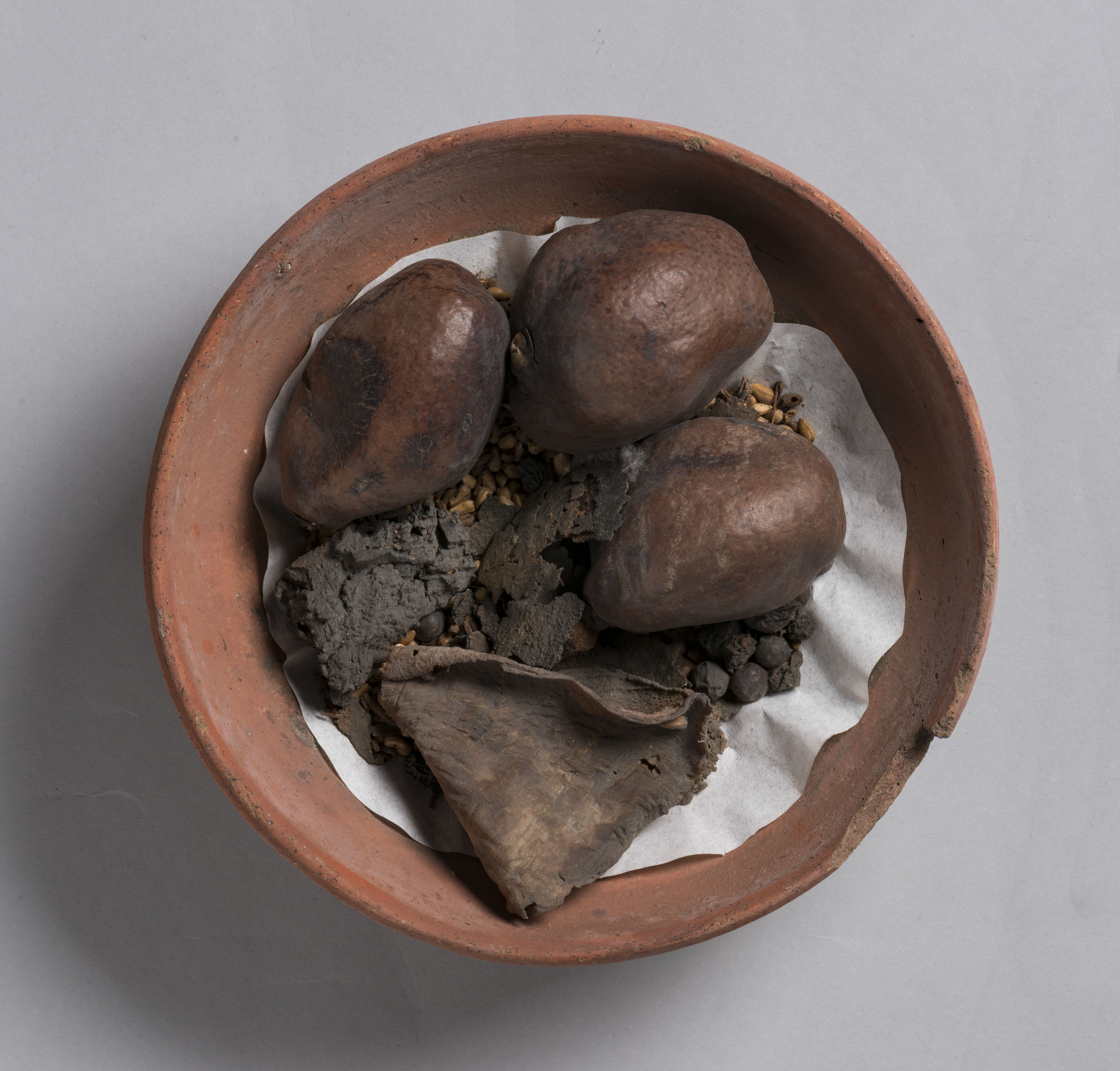
Cup with seeds, three dum nuts and dried fish, found in the tomb of Kha and Merit, between 1425 and 1353 BC. Museo Egizio, Turin.

The doum palm fruit-dates are edible. In Eritrea its name is Akat, or Akaat in the Tigre language. The thin dried brown rind is made into molasses, cakes, and sweetmeats. The unripe kernels are edible. The shoots of the germinated seeds are also eaten as a vegetable.

In Egypt, the fruit is sold by snack street vendors, and in herbalist shops. It is popular among children, gnawing its sweet yet sour hard fibrous flesh beneath the shiny hard crust. Occasionally, its pulp is roasted with sugar and made into a cold summer drink, similar to how Carob drink is made in Egypt. In Diu, Una and Saurashtra region of Gujarat (India), the tree is known as Hoka Tree and the red ripe edible fruit is known as Hoka. In the northern part of Nigeria, among the Hausa people, it is known as Goruba. In south-eastern Niger, its fruit pulp is known as bri and a traditional well-known millet pancake is made with this pulp as seasoning, called massan bri.

A commercial drink in Niger, called Torridité Glacée, is made from this fruit, somewhat reminiscent in taste of ice coffee or milk chocolate. Apart from the use of the fruit as food, juice is extracted from the young fruit and palm wine is prepared from the sap.

=== Egyptian tombs ===
Doum palm was considered sacred by the ancient Egyptians, and the seed was found in many pharaoh's tombs. On September 24, 2007, it was announced that a team of Egyptian archaeologists led by Zahi Hawass, discovered eight baskets of 3,000-year-old doum fruit in King Tutankhamun's tomb. The fruit baskets were each 50 centimetres high, the antiquities department said. The fruit are traditionally offered at funerals.
