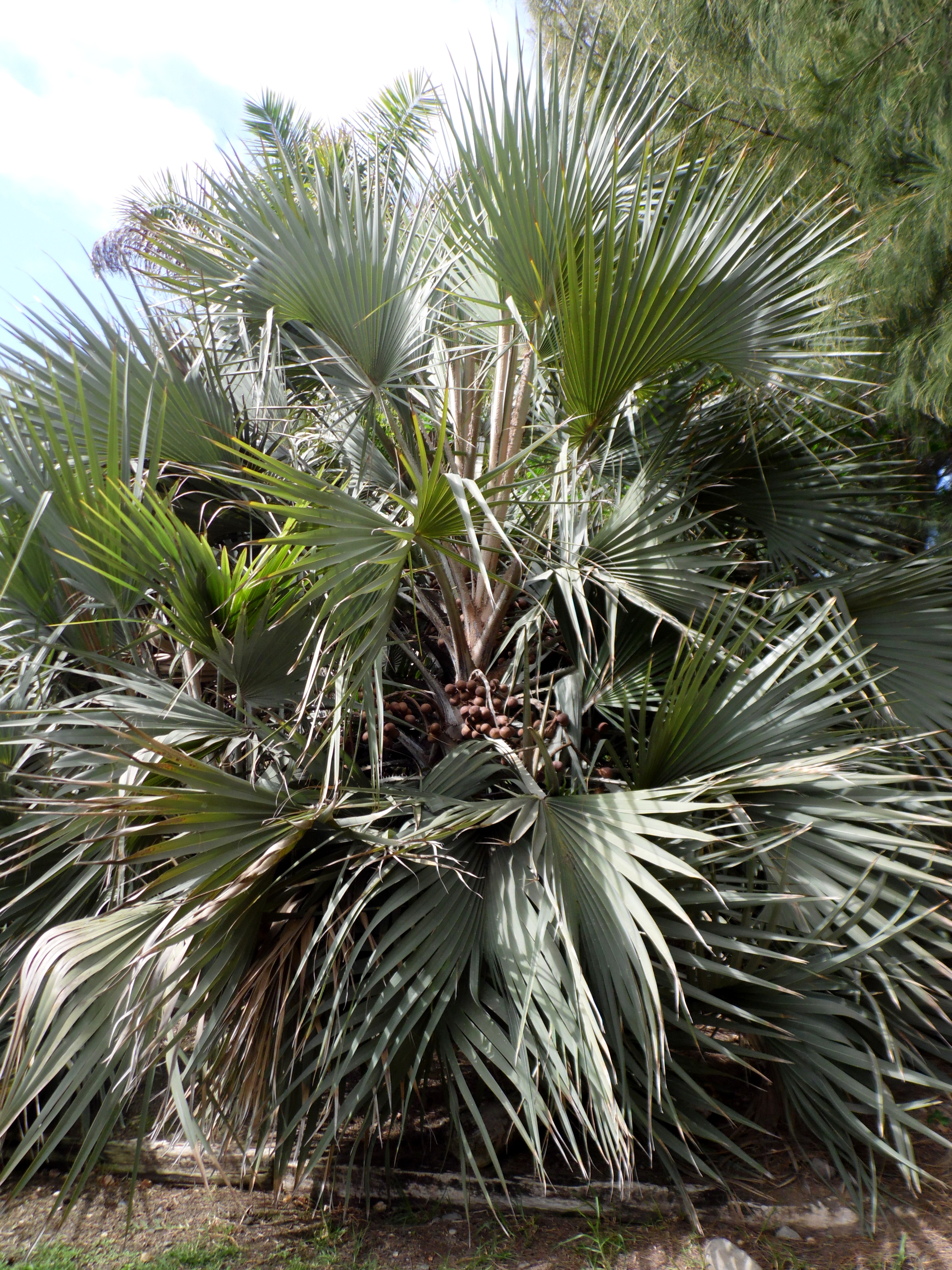
- In Maspalomas Botanical Garden, Gran Canaria

Scientific classification
- Kingdom: Plantae
- Clade: Tracheophytes
- Clade: Angiosperms
- Clade: Monocots
- Clade: Commelinids
- Order: Arecales
- Family: Arecaceae
- Genus: Hyphaene
- Species: H. coriacea

Binomial name
- Hyphaene coriacea Gaertn., 1788

Synonyms
- Hyphaene natalensis Kuntze

= Hyphaene coriacea =

Lala palm

Species of palm

Hyphaene coriacea, the lala palm or ilala palm is a species of palm tree native to the eastern Afrotropics. It occurs in eastern Africa from Somalia to Kwazulu-Natal, South Africa, and is also found in the coastal flats of Madagascar and on Juan de Nova Island in the Mozambique Channel Islands.

== Description ==
A clustering palm, usually found in groups of 2-6 but sometimes appearing solitary. The trunk grows 1-6 m tall and 10-20 cm in diameter, typically unbranched but occasionally branched, covered in old leaf bases forming a criss-cross pattern.

The crown has 9-20 leaves, spreading with recurved rachis, reaching up to 1.8 m. The open leaf sheath is up to 40 cm long, waxy brown with fibrous margins. The petiole measures 60-97 cm, widening at the base and narrowing distally, with black triangular spines up to 1 cm long. The leaf blade is about 70 cm long and 112 cm wide, divided into 39-55 segments with filaments at the sinuses. The outer segments are 31-48 cm long, central ones 40-58 cm, with faint minor veins covered in scattered reddish scales.

Male inflorescences are interfoliar, branched to two orders, with solitary or grouped rachillae 9-36 cm long. Flowers have greenish corolla lobes, yellow anthers, and a small pistillode. Female inflorescences are interfoliar, 60-120 cm long, branched to one order with 2-5 pendulous rachillae. Female flowers have slightly obovate petals, thin staminodes, and a globose ovary.

The fruit is irregularly top-shaped, 5-6 cm high and 4-6 cm in diameter, on a hairy pedicel up to 12 mm long. The mesocarp is fibrous, and the endocarp is hard and woody. The seed is about 2.7 cm wide with a homogeneous endosperm and a central hollow.

== Uses ==
The spongy pulp of the hard, brown fruit is edible and the fruit is eaten and sold in Madagascar and in eastern Africa; its Swahili name is Mkoma. The flavour has been compared to raisins and raisin bran.

== See also ==
- Fan palm
