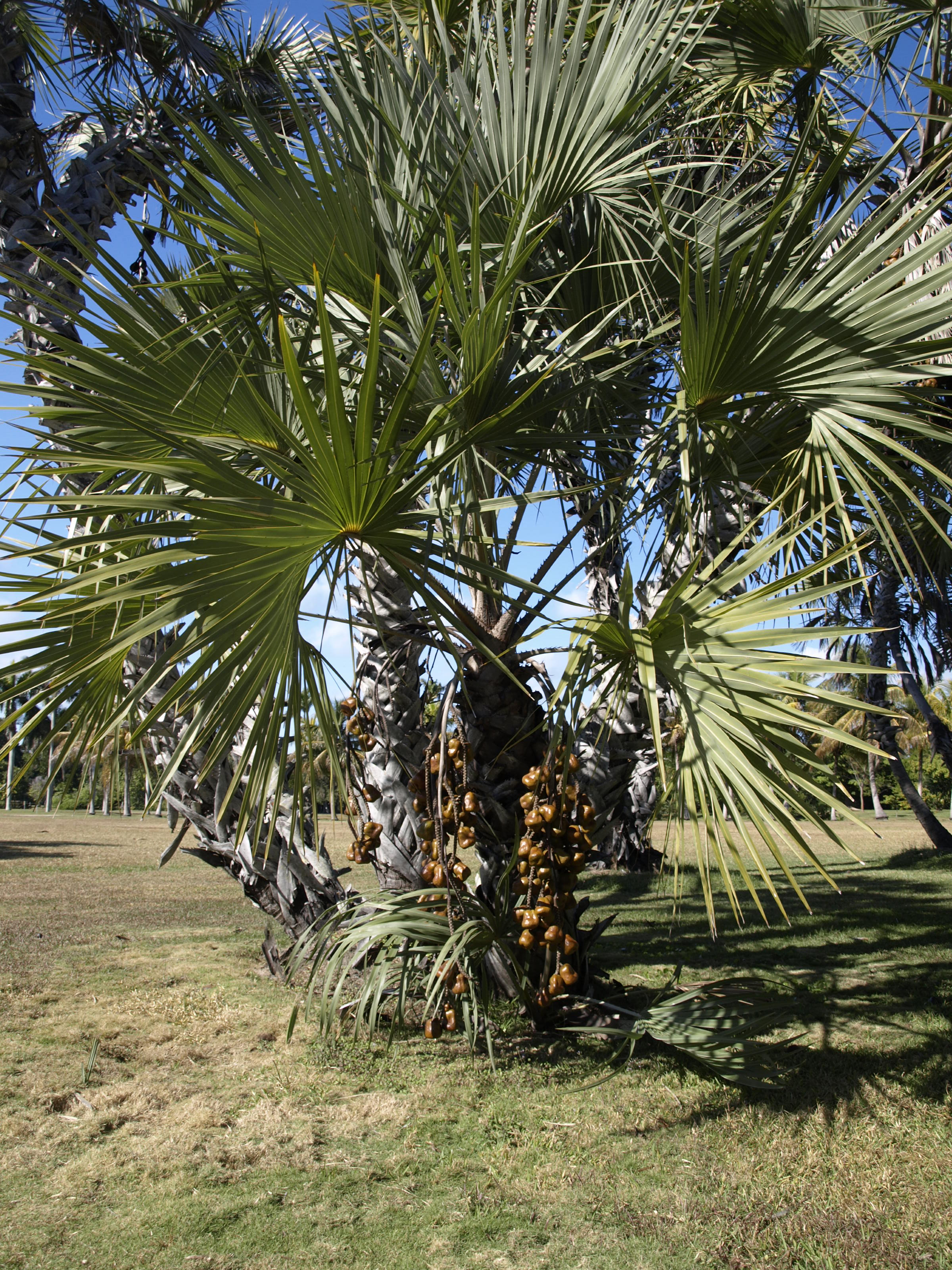
- Hyphaene dichotoma fruiting

Conservation status
- Near Threatened (IUCN 2.3)

Scientific classification
- Kingdom: Plantae
- Clade: Tracheophytes
- Clade: Angiosperms
- Clade: Monocots
- Clade: Commelinids
- Order: Arecales
- Family: Arecaceae
- Genus: Hyphaene
- Species: H. dichotoma

Binomial name
- Hyphaene dichotoma (White) Furt.

Synonyms
- Borassus dichotomus Wight; Hyphaene indica Becc.; Hyphaene taprobanica Furtado

= Hyphaene dichotoma =

Species of palm

Hyphaene dichotoma is a species of palm tree in the family Arecaceae. It is found in India and Sri Lanka. It is threatened by habitat loss.

It also widely found in most parts of East Africa and in very healthy populations, The tree's nuts are also a common eaten wild nut for almost all the areas it grows in.

Hyphaene dichotoma is nowhere close to being threatened by habitat loss in this parts of Africa especially Kenyan Coast as in some places it forms an almost entire forest.
