= Flavan =

Names
- IUPAC name Flavan
- Systematic IUPAC name 2-Phenyl-3,4-dihydro-2H-1-benzopyran

Identifiers
CAS Number	494-12-2
3D model (JSmol)	Interactive image
Beilstein Reference	383899
ChEBI	CHEBI:38691
ChEMBL	ChEMBL444299
ChemSpider	84973
ECHA InfoCard	100.007.079
EC Number	207-786-6
PubChem CID	94156
CompTox Dashboard (EPA)	DTXSID50870558
- InChI: InChI=1S/C15H14O/c1-2-6-12(7-3-1)15-11-10-13-8-4-5-9-14(13)16-15/h1-9,15H,10-11H2 Key: QOLIPNRNLBQTAU-UHFFFAOYSA-N
- SMILES: C1CC2=CC=CC=C2OC1C1=CC=CC=C1

Properties
Chemical formula	C_{15}H_{14}O
Molar mass	210.27 g/mol
- Except where otherwise noted, data are given for materials in their standard state (at 25 °C [77 °F], 100 kPa). verify (what is ?) Infobox references

The flavans are benzopyran derivatives that use the 2-phenyl-3,4-dihydro-2H-chromene skeleton. They may be found in plants. These compounds include the flavan-3-ols, flavan-4-ols and flavan-3,4-diols (leucoanthocyanidin).

A C-glycosidic flavan can be isolated from cocoa liquor.

Casuarina glauca is an actinorhizal plant producing root nitrogen-fixing nodules infested by Frankia. There is a regular pattern of cell layers containing flavans.
