= Johann Georg Krönlein =

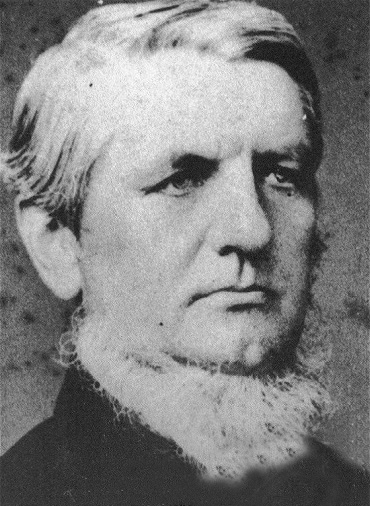

Johann Georg Krönlein (Segnitz, near Würzburg, Bavaria, Germany, 19 March 1826 – Wynberg, Cape Colony, 27 January 1892) was a Rhenish Missionary pioneer in South West Africa and a Bible translator and lexicographer of the Khoekhoe language. A neighborhood in Keetmanshoop, which he founded in 1866, is named after him.

== Early life and education ==
Krönlein was one of 11 children of Vitus Krönlein (1772–1834), a tanner, and Karoline Köllner (1794–1864), daughter of the pastor Wilhelm M.E. Köllner, who had a great influence on his grandchildren's choice of profession. Köllner wanted to become a missionary himself but later demurred. Several of Johann's sister's married pastors and two of his brothers took the missionary calling as well.

At first set to become a tradesman, Krönlein decided to become a missionary in November 1846. He trained at the Rhenish Missionary Institute in Barmen from 1846 to 1850.

== In South West Africa ==
Krönlein came to the Cape as a Rhenish Missionary in April 1851. That August, he was appointed successor to Johannes Samuel Hahn as chief of the mission in Berseba, South West Africa, at the time the isolated outpost of captain Paul Goliath and his Oorlam tribe, whose living conditions one missionary described as "fit for dogs and cats." There Krönlein would live for a quarter-century.

Already a stellar language student during his missionary training, Krönlein set about learning Khoekhoe, the language of the Nama people upon arrival in SWA. His task was difficult at first but helped immensely by the arrival of the Baster leader Daniel Cloete, who taught him well. In 1857, he married Sophie Terlinden (1819–1898), sister of a pastor in Stellenbosch. They were childless. In 1857, he inaugurated the church he helped build, taking a sabbatical to Cape Town for his health where he soon began his translation work over long hours with the help of Khoekhoe speakers and the linguist Wilhelm Bleek.

== Writing ==
In 1865, Krönlein left for Germany with his wife, manuscripts in tow. He produced three publications: Luther's Small Catechism (Berlin, 1866); the Calw edition of his Bible stories, ǃNai-ǃKeiti ǀneisa tsiǀasa testamens diti (Berlin, 1866); and his New Testament translation, ǃKhub tsi hui-aob Yesub Christub dis (Berlin, 1866, revised by his fellow Rhenish Missionary Hermann Kreft of Bethanie). He later translated the Old Testament into Khoekhoe as well, which was handed over to British and other foreign bible societies; the notes would only return to the Rhenish Missionary Society for formal publication in 1950.

During another leave in 1871, he published a short hymnal; followed by a translation of the Psalms, Kanis Psalmti dis (Cape Town, 1872); and a liturgical book Agendes Luther-ǁei kerkib (Cape Town, 1872). His most notable linguistic achievement is his dictionary, Wortschatz der Khoi-khoin (Namaqua-Hottentotten) (Berlin, 1889), published with the help of the Prussian Academy of Sciences and the German Colonial Society. This dictionary (with second editions published in the 1960s and 1970s) established the standard Khoekhoe orthography. Krönlein rendered click consonants under the Standard Alphabet by Lepsius, determining syllables by etymology and distinguishing three pitches (low, middle, and high). This improved on the spelling used by predecessors such as Heinrich Schmelen, Hans Christian Knudsen, and Henry Tindall. His work remains standard, though verb etymology remains nominal and speculative, and three clicks are not the only such sounds used. Later additions were made to the vocabulary as well. The book provides sentence examples for context and sample idioms as well.

== Missionary work ==
As a missionary, he was a strong personality, and a hard, exemplary worker, striving to keep his congregation out of inter-tribal raids. He returned in 1867 from his visit as Germany to become superintendent of the RMS in Namaland, a post he held until 1877, when health problems and family circumstances led him to retire to home life in Stellenbosch. During these years, he familiarized himself with the Nama tribes and Basters. By negotiating with the Nama chief Cornelius ǁOasib, Krönlein helped Kido Witbooi and his followers settle in Gibeon. During this period, he also founded Swartmodder (Keetmanshoop), on 14 April 1866. Swartmodder was named after a group of Oorlam he had served, Basters offered grazing lands by the Berseba Nama for two years (1868-1870).

Krönlein presided over the RMS conference in Otjimbinwe in 1870, and participated several months later in the peace conference between the Herero and Nama that was held in Okahandja in September 1870. Along with Carl Hugo Hahn and others, Krönlein played a major role in forging the "true peace" known as the Treaty of Okahandja, which held through 1880.

Krönlein's mission, Berseba, was a centrally located linchpin of the political controversies of the era, leading him to play a major role in them. When Cape Colony envoy W. Coates Palgrave visited in 1876, Krönlein negotiated potential Cape protectorate status for Namaland. A few years after his retirement, in 1882, he returned to SWA, trying in vain to reconcile the tribes that had returned to war in 1880.

== Retirement ==
In Stellenbosch, Krönlein taught Khoekhoe to young Rhenish Missionaries and worked tirelessly on his Old Testament translation into the language, which he completed by the end of the 1880s. He struggled to find peer review for publication, however, since colleagues were shunted to the war between the German government and Hendrik Witbooi until its conclusion in 1894. Therefore, Krönlein never lived to see his labor of love in print. His prayer book, ǁGoa-tsi ǃui-tsi gei-tseti-ǁaeguǀgoreti, also appeared after his death, in 1905.

Meanwhile, Krönlein was ordained on 1 January 1887 as the first dedicated pastor for the Evangelical Lutheran Church in Southern Africa congregation at St. John's Church in Wynberg when the latter congregation was separated from St. Martin's in Cape Town. Initially disappointed in the congregation, he concentrated his ministry on the German immigrant farmers of the Cape Flats. When he suddenly died of pneumonia in early 1892, St. John's was growing so rapidly that expansion was already being considered.

Krönlein and his wife, who survived him, are buried in the old cemetery of the Lutheran church on Wetton and Prince George Roads in Wynberg. Portraits of him remain in the archives of the RMS, and Heinrich Vedder published a profile of Krönlein as Am Lagerfeuer der andern (Windhoek, 1942). In St. John's Church of Wynberg, there is a commemorative marble plaque and an altarpiece (depicting the Resurrection) purchased in Berlin to honor him.

== Publications ==
- The New Testament in the Namalanguage (editing) (1866)
- Vocabulary of the Khoi Khoin (Namaqua-Hottentots) (1889
- The Book of Psalms in the Nama Language (1872)
- Elobmis (with F. H. Ponninghuas and J Olpp)

== Sources ==
- (af) De Kock, W.J. 1968. Suid-Afrikaanse Biografiese Woordeboek, vol. I. Pretoria: Nasionale Raad vir Sosiale Navorsing, Departement van Hoër Onderwys.
