= Heinrich Vedder =

German missionary, linguist, ethnologist and historian

Hermann Heinrich Vedder (born 3 July 1876 in Westerenger, Westphalia, Germany; died 26 April 1972 in Okahandja, South-West Africa) was a German missionary, linguist, ethnologist and historian. Originally a silk weaver, he received missionary training by the Rhenish Missionary Society in Barmen between 1894 and 1903, whereafter he was sent to German South West Africa in 1905 and worked as a missionary and teacher trainer until his retirement, first for the black workers and prisoners-of-war in Swakopmund, then at the small mission station Gaub in the Otavi Mountains, and from 1922 onwards in Okahandja, where he taught at the Augustineum school.

After his retirement, the National Party Government of South Africa nominated him as senator to represent the Namibian 'natives' (who had no vote) in the South African Senate in 1951. He vehemently defended the policy of apartheid. In his first speech he stated: "Our Government in South West Africa has been the depositary of a fine heritage. From the very beginning the German Government carried out that which has unfortunately not yet been attained in South Africa - namely, apartheid."

Vedder spoke fluently Oshindonga, Khoekhoe, and Otjiherero. He spent a lot of his time recording oral history and folklore and wrote school textbooks in Otjiherero and Khoekhoegowab.

His best known works are the ethnographic treatise Die Bergdama on history and culture of the Damara, his work on the pre-colonial history of South West Africa, South West Africa in Early Times, and his contribution to The Native Tribes of South West Africa. Vedder's historiography has been heavily criticized by recent academic historians for being not referenced and for its colonial apologetics and settler bias.

He received honorary doctorates from the universities of Tübingen (1925) and Stellenbosch (1949). A suburb of Okahandja is named Veddersdal (Afrikaans: Vedder's valley) in his honour.

== Youth and education ==
Vedder was the third and youngest child of Wilhelm and Anna Margarethe Vedder, small-scale farmers who also weaved and plied other handicrafts. They farmed a small plot near Lenzinghausen, Westphalia. According to the inheritance laws, as the youngest son, he was set to inherit the farm. Hermann Heinrich, known by his second name from childhood, never identified with his first. He was raised in a strict, devout home and attended the local primary school (Volksschule), where under the influence of his skilled teacher, Decius, became a diligent student, especially of languages. At twelve years of age, he began learning Greek with the help of a Greek New Testament and grammar; he learned cursive the same way.

=== Missionary calling ===
Initially, Vedder wanted to become a teacher, but his mother influenced him to become a missionary. When he was five, his mother told him something that shaped the rest of his life. She told him of the church in Gütersloh, where the missionary Carl Hugo Hahn sermonized at length on his missionary adventures in South West Africa, including his 15-year-long struggles that culminated in the baptism of the first Herero Christian, his maid Johanna Gertze, on July 25, 1858. He brought Johanna with him to Germany, both out of fear of leaving her among the unconverted and for help translating books into the Herero language. The "Black Johanna" spoke fluent German and made a major impression on the young Anna Vedder. "If there had been anything I could have done to help, Heinrich," she told her son, "I would have gone with Johanna to Africa. I did not know how, though. We often went at night to [suburb of Melle, Germany Hoyel, where the mission inspector Louis Harms, of the Hermannsburg Mission, told stories of the missions to Africa. If you, my son, go later to minister to Africa, I will not stand in your way, but I believe your father will firmly oppose it."

While these sentiments impressed a missionary calling on Heinrich, neither he nor Anna could dream that he would one day teach Gertze's niece in South West Africa.

=== Permission to join the mission ===
At the insistence of his father, Heinrich Vedder left school after his confirmation to help on the family farm and learn the weaving trade. The young Vedder was determined to be a missionary, but he was afraid to tell his father, serving him as a soldier in person then writing to express his true feelings. But at seventeen, another minor incident brought clarity. One August evening, Heinrich and his older brother, August, were walking through the stubble in the moonlight when it came out that August was going to marry and leave the farm to establish himself. Seized by a grave anxiety, Heinrich promised that he would stay on the farm in his brother's stead while he prepared to become a missionary. Heinrich knew his father liked to soak his aching feet in warm water each night, but his rheumatoid arthritis prevented his hands from reaching his feet, so Heinrich had to pull off the patriarch's socks and wash them himself. Wilhelm seldom spoke during this work, but he always was in a more relaxed mood then.

One Saturday night, Heinrich took this foot-washing as an opportunity to broach the news of August's pending engagement and leaving the farm. Wilhelm said that he was aware of this. "But will it be good for our farm," he asked Heinrich. Heinrich replied "He is better versed in farming than I. Wouldn't it be better if he stayed instead?" "Where do you want to go?" Wilhelm asked surprised. "If you have nothing against it," Heinrich replied, "I would like to study at the [Rhenish Missionary] Institute in Barmen to become a missionary." "Then go," his father said. And that was all that father and son said on the subject.

== In German South West Africa ==
=== Training as a missionary ===
After his father allowed him to become a missionary in 1894, he soon enrolled at the Rhenish Institute in Barmen, on April 1 of that year. From 1895 to 1901, he underwent his religious training, and after a gap year of military service, he passed his final exam in 1903. He was ordained on August 5, 1903. When it came time to dispatch him, he thought he was best suited to China, given his passion for China's ancient literature and civilization. The decision was up to mission inspector Johannes Spiecker, however, who had just returned from South West Africa and already decided to send Vedder to Swakopmund. To those on the committee who countered with Vedder's aptitude for China, he had a short, succinct retort: "Of all the missionary languages, Chinese is spoken in four pitches; Vedder is completely unmusical; therefore he cannot learn the language. So he can't go to China either!"

After the committee meeting, Vedder was given his orders to go to Swakopmund, first living with the missionary Johannes Friedrich Albrecht Böhm in Walvis Bay. But because Dutch and English were spoken there, he first went to Holland to learn Dutch and London to learn English. The meeting took place in August 1903, and his voyage to South West Africa set for December. Given a mere six months to learn both languages, he was able to preach in Dutch by the end.

=== Arrival in Africa ===
On November 28, 1903, Vedder boarded the SS Helene Woermann on the Woermann-Linie for German South West Africa. On December 27 of that year, Vedder and his fellow missionary Friedrich (Fritz) Eisenberg disembarked at the beach near Swakopmund and traveled on foot the 30 km to Walvis Bay. In the wooden church of Walvis Bay, he preached his first sermon on African soil in Dutch with a schoolmaster interpreting in Khoekhoe. He then left with a Dutchman, the Rev. Hermann Nijhof (Nyhof), for Rooibank (Scheppmansdorp) on the banks of the Kuiseb River, where some impoverished Nama people lived who could teach him Khoekhoe. Since there was no authoritative primer on the language, Vedder worked with a pair of linguistically gifted missionaries to write the first such work. In February 1904, six weeks after the outbreak of the Herero Wars, Vedder took the opportunity to relocate to Karibib, where the missionary August Elger offered him lodging and training in the Herero language. The journey from Swakopmund to Karibib took two days, with a stop each night, on an old narrow-gauge railroad. While he was assigned to work specifically with the Topnaar Nama of Walvis Bay, his year-long journey between Scheppmannsdorf, Karibib, and Otjimbingwe allowed him to learn Khoekhoe, Herero, and the Ndonga dialect of the Ovambo language.

In Karibib, Vedder would be able to visit Johanna Gertz, who lived in the local black neighborhood and had so inspired his mother and himself to his missionary career path. She lived entirely alone in the last cottage in the Damara quarter. A linguistic prodigy herself, Johanna had traveled with Hahn throughout Namaqualand and Cape Colony, eventually speaking Khoekhoe, Herero, Afrikaans, English, and German fluently and later teaching in Otjimbingwe. Baptized at 20, she had married a Baster, Johannes Gertze, with whom she had many children. She was renowned as the most renowned midwife in the area of Karibib, Otjimbingwe, and Omaruru, by white and black families alike, for her cleanliness, competence, and diligence. Vedder left Karibib for Otjimbingwe with Johannes Olpp, a missionary who furthered his instruction in Khoekhoe.

=== Settling in Swakopmund ===
In January 1905, Vedder settled in Swakopmund to minister to the local Nama dockworkers and Herero prisoners of war. At first escorted to services by soldiers, the POWs were later allowed to go to church on their own, which they allegedly used as a pretense to roam around the community. He learned that the Herero considered the "passiona" they requested from the military authorities a leave pass rather than a request to the "mission" for services. While he informed the military authorities of this tendency, he also tried to negotiate with them to provide better living conditions.

In Swakopmund, Vedder lived with the missionary Hammann in a small rectory built out of floorboard, which resembled a giant casket from afar. The surroundings were anything but agreeable: behind the rectory lay a bar where arriving and departing soldiers drank, sang, and gambled their wages away; in front of it lay a large barn where 100 Ovambo laborers slept, only to lay their blankets out in the sand and sun during the day to drive out the chigoe fleas or sand fleas, which proceeded to flee the heat for the cool of the rectory. By the custom of the day, Vedder visited his fellow townspeople in his top hat and tails, but was given a frosty reception by white settlers that blamed missionaries for the Herero uprising. Only the lonely tollbooth operator greeted him back.

Vedder opened a school for black children, held night catechism classes, and began writing his Khoekhoe grammar and a manual for acolytes. Without a church in Swakopmund yet, he held his first services in the magistrate's office. Although the service was announced in the local newspaper and police dropped off invitations at locals' homes, the only two in the pews the first day were the district chief, Dr. Fuchs, and his wife. The embarrassed Vedder and his two parishioners headed home. Undeterred and with a keen sense of human nature, Vedder offered his services to Major Friederichs to serve as a military champion, and was accepted as such to minister to around a thousand soldiers posted locally. Some troops were returning to Germany, others to the front, and still others were nursing injuries. These thousand soldiers, some still hung over from the aforementioned bar the prior night, had to wear their Sunday best to military services held with the assistance of the military band. The pews were reserved for civilians, who began coming in increasing numbers. Thereby was founded the Swakopmund congregation of the German-speaking Evangelical Lutheran Church in Namibia, in which Vedder finally won the respect of his German brethren.

=== Moving to Omaruru ===
After the end of the Herero Wars, Vedder moved to Omaruru to serve the Damara people. He revised and prepared for printing his New Testament in Khoekhoe and began writing Bible stories from the Old Testament in the language as well.

At a missionary conference in Hereroland, a training school was proposed for native teachers and pastors, similar to that which Hahn had founded in Otjimbingwe in 1864. Later, the Augustineum Secondary School, in Okahandja, took on that role. When the missionary Gottlieb Viehe died in 1901, however, there was no immediate successor as headmaster, and with the outbreak of the Herero revolt shortly afterwards, missionaries in general were in a precarious position. In Otjimbingwe, the missionary Peter Friedrich Bernsmann used the mission building as an orphanage for Herero children whose parents had perished in the conflict. In Okahandja, the Augustineum taught mixed-race children. In the north, near Tsumeb, a lush oasis named Gaub (or Ghaub) appealed to the farmer in Vedder, who suggested it as the location for the new training center where the students and staff could work undisturbed and be self-sufficient. His suggestion adopted, he was appointed headmaster of the new mission school in Gaub, but he first he had another responsibility. He lived in Omaruru for half a year to compile biblical narratives in Herero to serve as the school Bible and to prepare his New Testament for another print edition.

=== Stay in Gaub ===
In May 1911, Vedder moved to the Gaub mission, where he started training Nama and Herero educators and preachers. The courses for both groups lasted three years and he himself planned the curriculum. He focused on teaching their mother tongue and the Gospel along with German, then the official language. To maintain the school's independence, students took classes in the morning and then worked the farm in the afternoon. In the spring of 1914, the first class of pupils graduated. Several San families lived there as well, allowing Vedder to learn their dialect of Khoekhoe and their customs. In the winter of 1914, at the recommendation of his fellow missionaries, Vedder took an oxcart journey through the Kaokoveld to appraise possibilities for future missions in the area.

During the South West Africa Campaign (1915) of World War I, South African occupying forces closed the institution, but Vedder was allowed to continue ministering to the Damara and studying their way of life.

== After World War I ==
=== Work in Okahandja ===
In 1919, Vedder was deported to Germany, joining his wife who had returned there in 1914. The couple lived in straitened circumstances as Heinrich struggled to make a living with his writing. He declined an offer from a German congregation in South America, not wanting to abandon the Rhenish Missionaries.

In 1922, he was brought back to SWA at the insistence of the Cape Town-based Dutch Reformed Church in South Africa (NGK), and once more he trained teachers and pastors—this time at the Augustineum just outside Okahandja. With his usual zeal, he rejuvenated the institution, taking a study trip to the Union of South Africa to learn Afrikaans (his eighth language) and helping develop curriculum in tandem with the League of Nations mandate administration. During his 20 years as headmaster of the Augustineum, he personally supervised all religious education.

In 1937, he was elected president (Präses) of the Rhenish Missionary Society (RMS) in South West Africa, and by the outbreak of World War II, he was given the presidency of the German Evangelical Lutheran congregations as well. He served in both offices with distinction, and was retired with a pension at 68 in 1944, when the South West African Mandate government took over the Augustineum. He spent the rest of his days in a small missionary retreat in Okahandja, where he concentrated on writing works such as his memoirs, published as Kurze Geschichten aus einem langen Leben in 1953.

=== Advocate for German South West Africans ===
In the early postwar years, Vedder emerged as an advocate for the concerns of German Namibians and twice led delegations of them to South African Prime Ministers: in 1947 to Gen. Jan Smuts and in 1949 to Dr. Daniel Malan. In 1950, the Governor General of South Africa Ernest George Jansen named him a senator on behalf of indigenous peoples, an office in which he served for eight years. With the opening of the Parliament of South Africa by Jansen, on January 19, 1951, the first six representatives of South West Africa were seated following their election on August 30, 1950. The area was represented by four senators. All 10 delegates were from the National Party, except for Vedder, who was titled "the venerable German missionary, ethnologist, and historian, nominated by the government for his specialized knowledge on the natives."

In 1958, he was forced to resign from his office due to injuries sustained in a car crash.

== Writing ==
Vedder's time at the Augustineum was also the most prolific period in his writing career. A keen intellect, Vedder wrote about many subjects, including theology, history, linguistics, and ethnology. In addition, he published various adventures and children's stories. Much of his work was published in magazines both overseas and South West African, such as Afrikanischer Heimatkalender (the annual journal of the Lutheran Church in SWA), Journal der S.W.A. wissenschaftliche Gesellschaft, and Berichte der Rheinischen Mission en Zeitschrift für Kolonialsprachen.

Ethnological works include the essays, "Die Bergdama" (1923), "Die Bergdama in Südwestafrika" (1923), and his contributions on the Nama and Herero in "The native tribes of South West Africa" (1928), co-written with Carl Hugo Linsingen Hahn and Louis J. Fourie, for decades a standard work on the subject. His articles on the Herero, the Nama, and the Khoekhoe language contributed greatly to knowledge of them, while he is also renowned for the number of children's books, schoolbooks, and religious works that he translated into Herero and Khoekhoe.

Vedder's literature finds inspiration in the mysteries, people, plants, and animals of Namibia itself, highlighted by his two volumes Am Lagerfeuer; Geschichte aus Busch und Werft . . . ("At the Campfire: Stories of the Bush and Veld," 1938) en Am Lagerfeuer der Andern . . . ("At the Campfire of Others", 1938).

In 1926, he took a commission from the SWA government to write a general history of the region. He had access to valuable documents related to the early pioneers of South West Africa in the archives of the RMS in Barmen, copied and published in 28 chapters under the title Quellen zur Geschichte von Südwestafrika. The first volume of Vedder's history, Das alte Südwestafrika, was published in 1934, and while not flawless, it remained for a long time the standard history of early Namibia. An Afrikaans translation followed in 1937, and an English one in 1938. Vedder planned second and third volumes, but never started writing them due to lack of time.

He also contributed a selection on German rule and the military occupation of SWA in the 1936 edition of The History of the British Empire, and in 1928, he published Einführung in die Geschichte Südwestafrikas, aimed at a student audience. Vedder's most important religious publication was Die Hauskapelle, a calendar of daily devotionals published in 20 chapters. He was also a poet, mostly a hymnodist, who published a thousand songs in the series Sonntagsglöcken.

== Other accomplishments and honors ==
Vedder, as a respected missionary in the mandate territory, was asked on August 23, 1923, to rebury the remains of Samuel Maharero in Okahandja after his death in Serowe (Serui), Bechuanaland, on March 14 of the same year. Maharero was buried by his compatriots who had died at the Battle of Waterberg.

Vedder served in several other offices: from 1926 to 1947 he was the representative of the RMS at the German Evangelical Church Confederation; he was a member of the scientific society of SWA from its founding until 1938, when he was elected honorary member; from 1949 to 1954, he was a member of the SWA Historical Monuments Commission.

In 1924, the University of Pretoria offered Vedder a chair in African studies—including ethnic, linguistic, and religious aspects—but he declined it. He also declined an Emeritus post from the University of California because he preferred his simple black robe in South West Africa to the bright blue uniforms the latter school offered. A post as mission inspector in Germany proper similarly failed to take him away from South West Africa.

He was given various other honors. In 1911, he was awarded by the German government with an Order of the Crown, fourth class, for his work among the tribes. In 1925, he was also awarded an honorary Ph.D. for his ongoing research on the Damara. In 1948, the University of Stellenbosch awarded him a D.Litt. (honoris causa) for his research into the various languages of SWA, and in 1961, he was awarded honorary membership in the Afrika-Instituut. On his 90th birthday (1966), SWA published a 3.15 postage stamp with his image. He is buried in Okahandja.

== Personal life ==
Before he left Germany for South West Africa in 1903 he became engaged to a Red Cross nurse, Lydia Schickum. In 1905, he brought her to Swakopmund to marry. This marriage bore four children. According to the Vedder family gravestone in the Okahandja cemetery, Lydia Vedder died in 1943. His daughter Ruth was born in 1908 and died in 1927, his daughter Esther was born in 1911 and died in 1981, and a son, Martin, was born in 1912 and died in 1945. Details on the fourth child are missing.

== Works by Heinrich Vedder ==
- Die Bergdama. 2 Volumes. Hamburg : Friederichsen, 1923 (Hamburgische Universität. Abhandlung aus dem Gebiet der Auslandskunde, Vols 11 & 14, Series B, Völkerkunde, Kulturgeschichte und Sprachen, Vols 7 & 8)
- (the same in English:) The Bergdama. Köln, Rüdiger Köppe
- with Carl Hugo Hahn and Louis Fourie: The native tribes of South West Africa. 1. ed. New impr. 1928. - London : Cass, 1966
- South West Africa in Early Times. Being the story of South West Africa up to the date of Maharero's death in 1890. Cass & Co. London 1966
- Kurze Geschichten aus einem langen Leben (Short stories from a long life, autobiographical). Wuppertal, Rheinische Missionsgesellschaft, 1953

== Works about Heinrich Vedder ==
- Hans Martin Barth: Von draussen: Hermann Heinrich Vedder (1876-1972). Fragen und Anfragen zu einem geistlichen und weltlichen Leben. In: Missionsgeschichte, Kirchengeschichte, Weltgeschichte / ed. Ulrich van der Heyden, Heike Liebau, p. 405-424. Stuttgart, Steiner, 1996
- Julius Baumann: Mission und Ökumene in Südwestafrika, dargestellt am Leben und Werk Dr. Hermann Heinrich Vedder. Leiden, Brill, 1967
- Brigitte Lau: 'Thank God the Germans came'. Vedder and Namibian historiography. In: Brigitte Lau: History and historiography, 4 essays in reprint. Windhoek, Discourse/MSORP, 1995
- Walter Moritz: Dr. Heinrich Vedder, Vom Ravensburger Seidenweber zum berühmten Afrika-Missionar. (Dr Heinrich Vedder, From silk weaver from Ravensburg to famous missionary in Africa.) Kreuzfeld, Lempp, 1973
- Wahrhold Drascher and H.J. Rust (ed): Festschrift Dr.h.c. Heinrich Vedder: ein Leben für Südwestafrika. Windhoek, SWA Wissenschaftliche Gesellschaft, 1961
