= Johanna Gertze =

Namibian Herero and Christian convert

Johanna Uerieta Gertze (née Kazahendike) (Otjimbingwe, 16 July 1836 – 3 July 1935, Otjimbingwe) was a Namibian Herero and Christian convert.

Gertze worked in the household of Carl Hugo Hahn and his wife at Otjikango. She initially came to the school at the mission to learn sewing and soon became so proficient that she was teaching the art to others. She appears to have been fluent in English, Dutch, and German, and she assisted in translating a variety of materials into Herero. Between 1860 and 1862 Hahn published nine Herero publications in Germany, and there is evidence that Gertze assisted considerably in ensuring their success. She traveled with Hahn and his wife to Germany, participating in mission work as a convert and working on the books on Herero. In 1862 she came back to Cape Town, and in 1864 she returned to Otjikango. The following year, she married the Herero-German Samuel Gertze. He was a widowed father of eight; the couple had nine more children in the ensuing fifteen years, ending with Samuel's death in 1880. Johanna worked as a midwife and pharmacist for the remainder of her life. She was featured on a Namibian postage stamp in 1999.

== With the Hahn family ==
Uerita Kazahendike's mother was Herero and her father was Damara. By tribal custom, she was raised Herero. At 11 years old, she became the governess to the missionary Carl Hugo Hahn and his wife and children in Otjikango (later named Gross Barmen after the Rhenish Missionary Society's hometown). Hahn had founded the mission, west of Okahandja, on 31 October 1844. While looking after the Hahn children, she attended the mission school.

== In the service of the Kreft family ==
In 1853, the Rev. Hahn took home leave in Germany, and Uerita accompanied his family to port in Cape Town. After seeing them off, she returned to South West Africa with the missionary Johannes Rath, but instead of returning to Otjikango, she stayed behind in Bethanie with the family of another Rhenish Missionary, Hermann Kreft, working as a servant and learning Dutch and some German. In 1936, the missionary and educator Heinrich Vedder wrote from Uerita's perspective of an incident that made a lasting impression on Uerita and probably contributed to her conversion: "It was little Mary's bedtime. After her bath, I went to her room to tuck her in. However, she was reluctant to get into bed and knelt before me, folding her hands together and asking me to pray with her as her mother did at bedtime. I did not know how to do so and it made me feel ashamed."

Uerita lived with the Kreft family in Namaland until 1857. Here she encountered a Christian congregation, an unusual sight in Hereroland, and attended catechism with a group of Nama. However, she still had no desire to be baptized and Kreft did not pressure her to change her mind.

== Return to the Hahns ==
The Hahn family returned in 1857 to Hereroland and Uerita joined them once more in Otjimbingwe. On 25 July 1858, she was baptized on the mission as Johanna, the first Herero woman to join the Christian faith.

She was indispensable in Hahn's efforts to translate stories from the Bible into Herero. Later, she accompanied the family to Germany to proofread books published in Herero out of Gütersloh. They stayed there in the mission home available to missionaries on home leave. Later, Vedder's mother made Johanna's acquaintance, making such an impression on her that she urged her son, born in 1876, to become a missionary to young people in Africa.

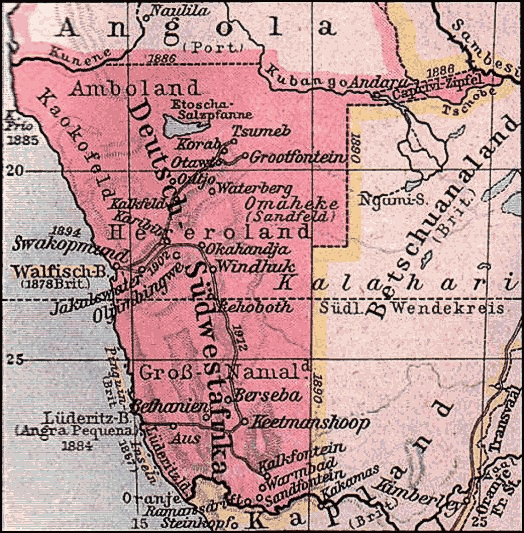
Johanna Gertze lived first in Otjikango (Gross Barmen) near Okahandja, then later in Bethanie in Namaland and finally in Hereroland: among other places, in Gross Barmen, Omaruru, and finally Otjimbingwe

== In Germany ==
Johanna had a great task ahead of her in Germany. She managed the Hahn household along with participating in missionary work and proofreading prints from Bertelsmann of Hahn's written work in Herero. Along with a New Testament in Herero, Bertelsmann also published a grammar and a comprehensive dictionary. Unfortunately, Johanna struggled to adjust to life in Europe. "It is a beautiful land, but only if one is born there," she later said. "If one is born in Africa, one should stay in Africa."

== Married life ==
In 1861, she returned to her homeland on the advice of her doctor, who believed the German climate was adversely affecting her health. Hugo Hahn, who would stay in Germany another two years, suggested that Johanna work for the household of Peter Heinrich Brinker, a young missionary in Otjikango. Samuel Gertze (born around 1805 in Kookfontein, died on 15 October 1889 in Otjimbingwe) lived in Otjikango at the time and had just become a widow with eight children. He married Johanna by the Herero custom, contributing the slaughter of two cattle and several goats for the wedding feast.

The missionary dealer Johann Wilhelm Redecker, then a bachelor, was sent in 1868 to Omaruru to teach the locals to plant vegetable gardens and wheat fields. With her husband's permission, Johanna became Redecker's housekeeper while Gertze's adult daughters looked after their father. Once Redecker married, Johanna and Samuel moved to Anahout on the Swakop River where they supervised the Rhenish Missionaries' wheat fields.

Johanna and Samuel had nine children, of whom two died in infancy. Samuel died of a ripe old age in 1889. Johanna was around 60 when she decided to become a midwife, and she helped bring many of Redecker's children into the world. She was highly proficient, to the point that she assisted with the pregnancies of many other European settler women.

== Last years ==
On 25 July 1933, the Ojimbingwe Rhenish congregation celebrated a milestone with the 75th anniversary of Johanna's baptism. Though 97 and frail, she attended the event and regaled them with stories from the old days. "The Lord sure forgot to take me," she quipped at the event. After her death a mere two years later at the age of almost 99, she was buried next to her husband in the Otjimbingwe cemetery. Their names are chiseled on a tombstone from which a cross appears.

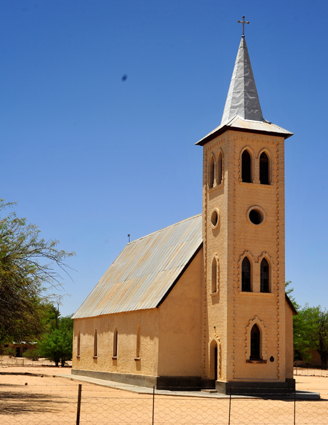
On July 25, 1933, the local Rhenish congregation celebrated the 75th anniversary of the first baptism among the Herero, Johanna Gertze

== Legacy ==
In 1936, Vedder's book Die schwarze Johanna: Lebens- und Zeitbild der 99jährigen Johanna Gertze, der Erstlingsfrucht vom Missionsfelde des Hererolandes ("The Black Johanna: The Life and Times of 99-Year-Old Johanna Gertze, the First Fruits of the Mission in the Herero Lands") was published by the Rhenish Missionaries' press, Verlag des Missionshauses.

In 1999, NamPost, the Namibian national postal service, issued a stamp honoring Gertze.

== Sources ==
- (af) Johanna Gertze, the first Christian Herero woman, by Walter Moritz, Republikein, 7 February 2014. URL accessed 17 April 2016.
- (af) Von Moltke, J. Huisgenoot, 1 July 1949.
- (af) De Kock, W.J. 1968. Suid-Afrikaanse Biografiese Woordeboek, part I. Pretoria: Nasionale Raad vir Sosiale Navorsing, Departement van Hoër Onderwys.
- (en) Johanna Gertze's life story from the New Era website. New Era. URL accessed 18 April 2016.
