= Gottlieb Viehe =

German missionary and early settler in present-day Namibia

Friedrich Wilhelm Gottlieb Viehe (27 March 1839 – 1 January 1901) was a German missionary of the Rheinische Missionsgesellschaft (Rhenish Missionary Society) and an early settler in present-day Namibia. He was born in Mennighüffen, (now part of the city of Löhne).

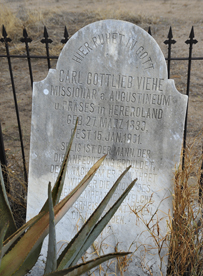
Grave marker of Viehe in Okahandja

His first exposure to missionary work in Africa was in 1867 at the settlement of Otjimbingwe where he worked with the Ovaherero. In 1870 he moved to Omaruru and established a small school for children of European settlers. In 1872, he built a mission house in Omaruru, and soon after translated the New Testament into the Otjiherero language.

In 1885, Viehe constructed the first meteorological station in the newly formed colony of German Southwest Africa at Omaruru. In 1890, he moved to Okahandja, where he was head of the Augustineum. It was here he had a confrontation with Theodor Leutwein, commandant of the Schutztruppe, who accused Viehe of "mild treatment" in regard to his relations with indigenous Africans.

== Childhood and education ==
The Viehe family moved to the USA in 1844 and Friedrich spent the next 15 years in Indiana, He returned to Germany to train as a missionary at the Rhenish Missionary Institute in Barmen. On 16 August 1866 he passed his examination, on 17 October he was ordained, and in December he was dispatched by the RMS to South West Africa.

== In South West Africa ==
In May 1867, Viehe began his stay in Otjimbingwe, where he taught at the Augustineum with Carl Hugo Hahn and learned the Herero language. On 17 June 1869 he married Minette Vogt of Gütersloh in Otjimbingwe. The marriage produced three children: Heinrich (7 May 1872), Gottlieb (25 December 1874) en Dorothee (13 June 1876).

In 1870, he moved to Okozondje (Omaruru), established in 1868 by Herero from Otjimbingwe and others from Otjikango (Gross Barmen), once the local Damara people fled to Okombahe. Omaruru was home to many European merchants and hunters, including Axel Wilhelm Eriksson. Viehe also founded a school for the local Herero, but the one he founded for white and mixed-race children closed within six months. In 1871, after Manasse Tyiseseta joined the staff of the Herero school, Viehe opened a school for eight Swedish children and taught English. His evening classes for boys and young men did not last long.

He preached to the natives, and each Sunday held two services, one for Herero and one for white settlers. In the evenings, he studied. In Omaruru, Viehe built a house and church, which he inaugurated in 1874.

He returned to Germany in 1887, but in 1889, he came back to Africa to supervise the move of the Augustineum to Okahandja, where he welcomed 12 pupils on 14 April 1890. He built his own rectory there, opening on 14 November 1890. Until his death, he was the praeses (superintendent) of the Rhenish Missionaries operating among the Herero.

Minette died in 1894. Two years later, on 3 November 1896, he married his second wife, Clara Roth.

== Other interests ==
Viehe concerned himself not just with missionary work but also with the reserve and land issues handled by the German authorities. His views on the future of the reservations contrasted with the official position. For example, he believed the central missions should become native population centers, while the government policy had been to push them to the periphery.

Viehe was an avid student of and specialist in Herero culture. He wrote "Some customs of the Ovaherero," with a foreword by W.C. Palgrave, in the first edition of the Folk-Lore Journal (January 1879). Other publications include the second edition of Peter Heinrich Brincker's hymnal Omaimburiro oozombongo zovaherero puna Okatechismium katiti (Bielefeld, 1895); "Grammatik des Otjiherero nebst Wörterbuch" ("Herero Grammar and Dictionary," Lehrbücher des Seminars für orientalischen Sprachen zu Berlin), vol. 16 (Stuttgart, 1897); Omambo Uomahihamisiro nongokero ja Muhona Jesus Christus (a Passion narrative) (Cape Town, 1897); and Omaitonge uokutjanga nonkulesa otjiherero la (a prayer book) (Gütersloh, 1897).

Viehe worked with Brincker and Carl Gotthilf Büttner on translating the New Testament into Herero. Gerald McKiernan and Hans Schinz both testified to Viehe's animated personality. A description of him and his first pupils can be found in Julius Baumann's Van sending tot kerk (125 jaar Rynse sendingwerk in Suidwes-Afrika, 1842–1967) (Karibib, 1967). There is also a description of Viehe in August Wilhelm Schreiber's Fünf Monate in Süd-Afrika ("Five Months in Southern Africa", Barmen, 1894) and Johannes Spiecker's Er führt mich auf rechter Strasse ("He Leads Me on the Right Path," Gütersloh, 1903).

According to the Suid-Afrikaanse Biografiese Woordeboek ("South African Biographical Dictionary"), after Viehe's death in 1901, his widow Minette continued his missionary work as the first "missionary sister" in South West Africa, but according to the inscription on her gravestone in the Rhenish Missionary Cemetery in Okahandja, she died on 13 December 1894, seven years before her husband.

== Sources ==
- (af) De Kock, W.J. 1968. Suid-Afrikaanse Biografiese Woordeboek, vol. I. Pretoria: Nasionale Raad vir Sosiale Navorsing, Departement van Hoër Onderwys.
- (en) Potgieter, D.J. 1972. Standard Encyclopaedia of Southern Africa, vol. VI. Cape Town: Nasionale Opvoedkundige Uitgewery Ltd.
