= Hermann Kreft =

Hermann Heinrich Kreft (Wallenbrück, Prussia, May 7, 1823 - Grootfontein, Maltahöhe district, South West Africa, May 3, 1878) was a Rhenish Missionary in South West Africa. He made an important contribution to the translation of the New Testament into Khoekhoe through his careful revisions of the work of Johann Georg Krönlein.

== Work in South West Africa ==
Kreft worked as an innkeeper, but after three years of service in the Prussian Army, he enrolled at the Rhenish Missionary Institute in Barmen on January 1, 1848. After graduation, he began his ministry in May 1853 in Bethanie, South West Africa. Though not considered a full missionary yet, his decisive actions against the Nama captain David Christiaan Goliath earned him full ordination in 1856. From 1853 to 1858, Uerieta Kazahendike lived at his house in Bethanie. On July 25, 1858, shortly after moving into the house of the Rev. Carl Hugo Hahn in Gross Barmen, Uerieta was baptized Johanna, the first convert among the Herero.

Kreft's hard work was rewarded by the dedication of a new church in Bethanie on June 26, 1859. Unfortunately, Christiaan's alcoholism proved influential among the locals, and the mission was further hampered by constant Herero-Nama wars, heavy drought, and plagues of locusts. These hazards often required the residents of Bethanie to flee with their livestock. Part of the congregation, disillusioned with Christiaan, traveled north to settle in Grootfontein in Maltahöhe. Kreft left to persuade them to return, but became seriously ill and died there.

== Legacy ==
Kreft was the patriarch of the Kreft family in South Africa. After the death of his first wife, Julie Seringhaus, in 1861, he married Magdalena Hatje. One of his sons, Hermann Heinrich Gerhard Kreft (April 6, 1855 - August 11, 1927), also an industrious missionary, especially in Tulbagh.

== Sources ==
(af) Krüger, Prof. D.W. and Beyers, C.J. 1977. Suid-Afrikaanse Biografiese Woordeboek, vol. III. Cape Town: Tafelberg-Uitgewers.
