= Godfrey Gaoseb =

Namibian government official (1941–2014)

Special Advisor on Economics
- In office 2001–2012
- President: Sam Nujoma; Hifikepunye Pohamba

Permanent Secretary at the Ministry of Finance
- In office 1990–1996
- President: Sam Nujoma
- Minister: Otto Herrigel; Gert Hanekom; Helmut Angula

Personal details
- Born: Godfrey Gaoseb; 17 September 1941 Otjiwarongo
- Died: 16 March 2014 (aged 72) Katutura State Hospital, Windhoek
- Citizenship: Namibia
- Party: South West Africa National Union(SWANU); South West Africa People's Organisation (SWAPO)
- Spouse: Charity Mulopei Mungana Gaoses (m. 1947)
- Education: Augustineum High School; Accra Academy
- Alma mater: Stockholm University
- Occupation: Economist; Politician

Godfrey ǀKhaesen Gaoseb (17 September 1941 – 16 March 2014) was a Namibian economist and civil servant. He served as the first permanent secretary in the Namibian Ministry of Finance after the independence of Namibia, an executive director of the World Bank, and as the Special Advisor on Economics to presidents Sam Nujoma and Hifikepunye Pohamba.

== Early life and education ==
Gaoseb was born on 17 September 1941, in Otjiwarongo, Namibia to parents, Lise Gaoses and Kraai Hoeseb. He attended Mine Plus Primary School in Tsumeb and continued at Augustineum Training College in Okahandja, where he attended classes with prominent Namibian leaders like Hage Geingob, Mose Tjitendero, Joseph Ithana, and Hidipo Hamutenya. He went into exile in 1962 as a member of the South West Africa National Union (SWANU) to join the national liberation struggle and to further his education.

Gaoseb traveled through Botswana and the former Southern Rhodesia (now Zimbabwe) to Dar es Salaam in Tanganyika (now Tanzania). From Dar es Salaam, he traveled to Accra, Ghana in 1964 to complete his secondary education at the Accra Academy. During his stay in Ghana, he was invited by Kwame Nkrumah, the president of the Republic of Ghana, for discussions about the role of the youth in the liberation of Southern Africa. In 1966, Gaoseb proceeded to Sweden to pursue studies in economics at Stockholm University. He obtained a BA and MA in economics, Banking, and Finance. He later worked at the Swedish Ministry of Finance.

== Career ==
During 1981, Goaseb returned to Africa and started work at the United Nations Institute for Namibia in Lusaka, Zambia, as a financial officer. He joined SWAPO in 1982.

Gaoseb returned to Namibia in 1989 during the implementation of United Nations Security Council Resolution 435. He became the first permanent secretary in the Ministry of Finance after Namibia's independence in 1990. Gaoseb served in that position until 1996 when he left Namibia to represent his country as alternate and later, executive director at the World Bank.

He returned to Namibia in 2000. In 2001, President Sam Nujoma named him to be his Special Advisor on Economics. Gaoseb also served as an economic advisor to President Hifikepunye Pohamba who succeeded Nujoma as president of Namibia in 2005. Gaoseb retired from the public service in 2012. During his tenure in the public service, Gaoseb was instrumental in the establishment of a multitude of state-owned enterprises such as the Government Institutions Pension Fund (GIPF), Namibia Financial Institutions Supervisory Authority (Namfisa), and the National Special Risks Insurance Association (NASRIA), among others.

== Personal life and death ==
Gaoseb married his wife, Charity Mulopei Mungana Gaoses, in 1983 in Lusaka, Zambia. He died on 16 March 2014, at the age of 72, after he accidentally fell from the stairs in his Windhoek home. According to his wife, he tripped on the stairs and lost consciousness. He was rushed to Katutura State Hospital, where he remained in a coma until his death two weeks later. His memorial service was held at Windhoek City Congregation Lutheran Church, and he was laid to rest on 22 March 2014, in the Pioneers Park Cemetery. He was survived by his wife, two daughters, grandchildren, sole surviving sister, and nieces.
