= Manasse Tyiseseta =

Manasse Tyiseseta (25 April 1850, Otjimbingwe – 17 April 1898, Omaruru) was the leader of a group of Herero with their headquarters in Omaruru in what is today Namibia.

== Life ==
Tyiseseta studied at the Augustineum Secondary School in Otjimbingwe. In 1867, he journeyed with Christian Wilhelm Zeraua to Omaruru. Manasse taught at the local school from 1871 to 1882.

Tyiseseta married Zeraua's daughter Albertina Tjiseseta Zeraua. They had three children. Tyiseseta died on 17 April 1898 of typhoid.

== Leadership ==
Tyiseseta was the half brother of chief Tjaherani (tenure: 1860–1884). After the deaths of Tjaherani and Christian Wilhelm Zeraua in 1884, Tyiseseta became the Herero leader of Omaruru. He signed a treaty of protection on 3 November 1885 with Heinrich Ernst Göring and the German Empire. The missionaries Carl Gotthilf Büttner and Gottlieb Viehe were also present.

Tyiseseta kept his tribe independent of the Germans and the chieftain Samuel Maharero for many years. trading with South Africa for weapons, ammo, and other goods. He had his own armed forces.

Samuel Maharero was named the chief Herero leader under German auspices in Augustus 1891, but other chiefs objected. That November 26, Theodor Leutwein negotiated a meeting between Samuel Maharero and Zacharias Zeraua, both agreeing to meet with Tyiseseta. From then on, Tyiseseta's political dominance was backed up by German military might.

== Bibliography ==
(de) Joris de Vries: Manasse Tjiseseta, chief of Omaruru 1884–1898, Namibia. Cologne: Verlag Köppe, 1999.
