= Venaani =

Venaani is an Ovambo surname. Notable people with the surname include:

- McHenry Venaani (born 1977), Namibian politician
- Mike Venaani (born 1950), Namibian politician and farmer

Yueejejejjw
