= Hester Needham =

Hester Needham may refer to:

- Hester Bateman, née Needham, English silversmith
- Hester Needham (author), British missionary and travel writer
