= Kreft =

Kreft is a surname. Notable people with the surname include:

- Bratko Kreft (1905-1996), Slovenian playwright
- Galina Kreft (1950-2005), Soviet sprint canoer
- Hermann Kreft (1823-1878), Rhenish Missionary in South West Africa
- Jon Kreft (born 1986), American basketball player
- Lev Kreft (born 1951), Slovenian politician
- Marie Kreft (1876–1963), German politician
- Tony Kreft (born 1945), New Zealand rugby player
