= Krönlein =

Krönlein is a surname. Notable people with the surname include:

- Kronlein family, owners of Krönleins, a Swedish brewery
- Johann Georg Krönlein (1826–1892), Rhenish Missionary pioneer in South West Africa
- Rudolf Ulrich Krönlein (1847–1910), Swiss surgeon
