= Cocky Hahn =

South African rugby union player

- Full name: Carl Hugo Linsingen Hahn
- Born: 7 January 1886
- Died: 27 September 1948 (aged 62) Grootfontein, South West Africa (present day Namibia)
- Height: 1.77 m (5 ft 10 in)

Rugby union career
- Position: Wing
Provincial / State sides
Years	Team	Apps	(Points)
- Transvaal
International career
Years	Team	Apps	(Points)
1910	South Africa	3	(3)

Carl Hugo Linsingen Hahn (7 January 1886 – 27 September 1948), known as Cocky Hahn, was a South African international rugby union player.

Hahn was the son of a Lutheran minister and grandson of Baltic German missionary Carl Hugo Hahn. His mother was also of German ancestry. He may have been born in South West Africa (sources vary), but did grow up in Paarl, and was educated at Paarl Boys' High School.

A wing three–quarter, Hahn represented Transvaal and in 1910 was capped for the Springboks on the right wing for all three Test matches in their 2–1 series win over the visiting Great British team (now known as the Lions). He scored the winning try on his debut match at the Wanderers Ground in Johannesburg.

Hahn served with the Imperial Light Horse in World War I.

Post war, Hahn was a long serving Native Commissioner in Ovamboland. He was fluent in the language of the Ovambo people and considered an expert on the tribes of South West Africa, so much so that he participated in delegations to the United Nations during the 1940s.

== See also ==
- List of South Africa national rugby union players
