= Anna Pauw =

Anna Margaretha Pauw (née Rath, 29 March 1851 – 26 January 1940) was a mission teacher and wife of the missionary church leader and lecturer Jacobus Pauw.

== Background ==
Anna Pauw was born in March 1851 on the Otjimbingwe mission in Damaraland, which her father Johannes Rath (missionary) had founded two years earlier in the name of the Rhenish Missionary Society. She was the second of six children of Rath and his wife Anna Jörris, van Mettmann. Anna spent her first seven years on the Otjimbingwe mission. In October 1858, Anna, her five siblings, and parents traveled by ship from Walvis Bay to Cape Town, where the two oldest (Anna and Katharina Emma) were to board at the Rhenish Institute (now the Rhenish Girls' High School. On the family's return voyage on 1 April 1859, Anna and Emma's mother and four siblings died in a shipwreck. Only their father survived, and wrote a letter to his two daughters in Stellenbosch, encouraging them to be brave. He compared their mother's suffering to Christ's on the cross. To comfort them, he relayed her telling him a short while before her death that she "was not wholly uneasy," and reminded them that even Jesus, for his part, felt compelled to cry out 'My God, my God, why have you forsaken me?' (Matthew 27:45).

== Career ==
Anna taught school from 1882 to 1898 in Sarepta, today a suburb of Cape Town. In July 1882, Anna Rath took over the school in Sarepta, where her father had moved, with the young Maria Thomas as her assistant. The schoolhouse with its clay floor was already dilapidated. In October 1890, Anna informed the superintendent-general of education, Dr. Langham Dale, that the Cape government had not earmarked any funds for building schools, and her father accordingly took the lead, spearheading the demolition of the school to rebuild a new one that December. Local farmers and other community members each donated 500 or more bricks so the school, consisting of two classrooms, could open Easter Monday 30 March 1891.

Anna also worked in Amaliënstein, a mission of the Berlin Missionary Society 22 km east of Ladysmith, KwaZulu-Natal, and at the nearby Zoar, Western Cape, operated by the South African Missionary Society. In both places, she educated the mission employees' children, but sources are unclear as to whether she taught in both simultaneously or consecutively. Perhaps she worked at both missions before moving to Sarepta, since at the time (1882), she was already 30 or 31.

== Married life ==
In November 1898, at the age of 47, she first married the 60-year-old Rev. Jacobus Pauw, a widower with 12 children by his first wife, Anna Margaretha Kirchner. Anna moved to Wellington, Western Cape, where her father lived in the town rectory; he died in 1903, while visiting his elder daughter, and was buried in Sarepta.

Anna's husband, the Rev. Pauw, retired as a minister in the Dutch Reformed Church in South Africa (NGK) in 1910 to a £100 stipend (in the days before pensions). In 1913, he also retired as a docent at the Missionary Institute, and he died on 13 June 1918. Anna survived him by about 22 years, and wrote a biography of him that was published in 1943, three years after her death.

== Sources ==
- (af) Krüger, Prof. D.W. and Beyers, C.J. (ed.) Suid-Afrikaanse Biografiese Woordeboek vol. III. Cape Town: Tafelberg-Uitgewers, 1977.
- (af) Vermaak, Adinda. Kroniek van 'n kontrei, die verhaal van die NG kerk Kuilsrivier. Kuilsrivier: NG Kerkraad, 2004.
- (en) Klaus Dierks: KlausDierks.com Biographies of Namibian Personalities. URL accessed 20 April 2016.
