= Savola =

Savola may refer to:

- Savola (surname), Finnish surname
- The Savola Group, Saudi Arabian industrial food and grocery company
- Red onion in the Malayalam language
