= Johannes Isaaks =

Namibian teacher, politician and community activist

Johannes Isaaks (23 January 1941 – 19 March 2010) was a Namibian teacher, politician and community activist. He attended teacher training at the Augustineum in Okahandja in the 1960s. He then taught at a number of prominent schools prior to and after independence of Namibia. Later he became the first mayor of Gibeon. Isaaks had eight children.
