= Okahandja railway station =

Railway station in Namibia

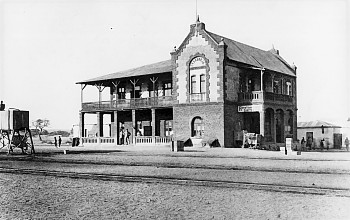
- Okahandja railway station in 1903

General information
- Coordinates: 21.9796°S 16.9143°E
- System: Railway station
- Owner: TransNamib Railway

History
- Opened: 1902
Location

Okahandja railway station is a railway station serving the town of Okahandja in Namibia. It is part of the TransNamib Railway.

Okahandja is situated on the Windhoek—Swakopmund line, built in 1902 during Imperial Germany's colonial rule of German South West Africa. In 1914 this line was extended to Walvis Bay.

Okahandja is connected to a number of towns in the north of Namibia via the railway junction in Kranzberg, which lies on the Windhoek-Swakopmund-Walvis Bay route, and to the south and east of Namibia via Windhoek.

== Gallery ==
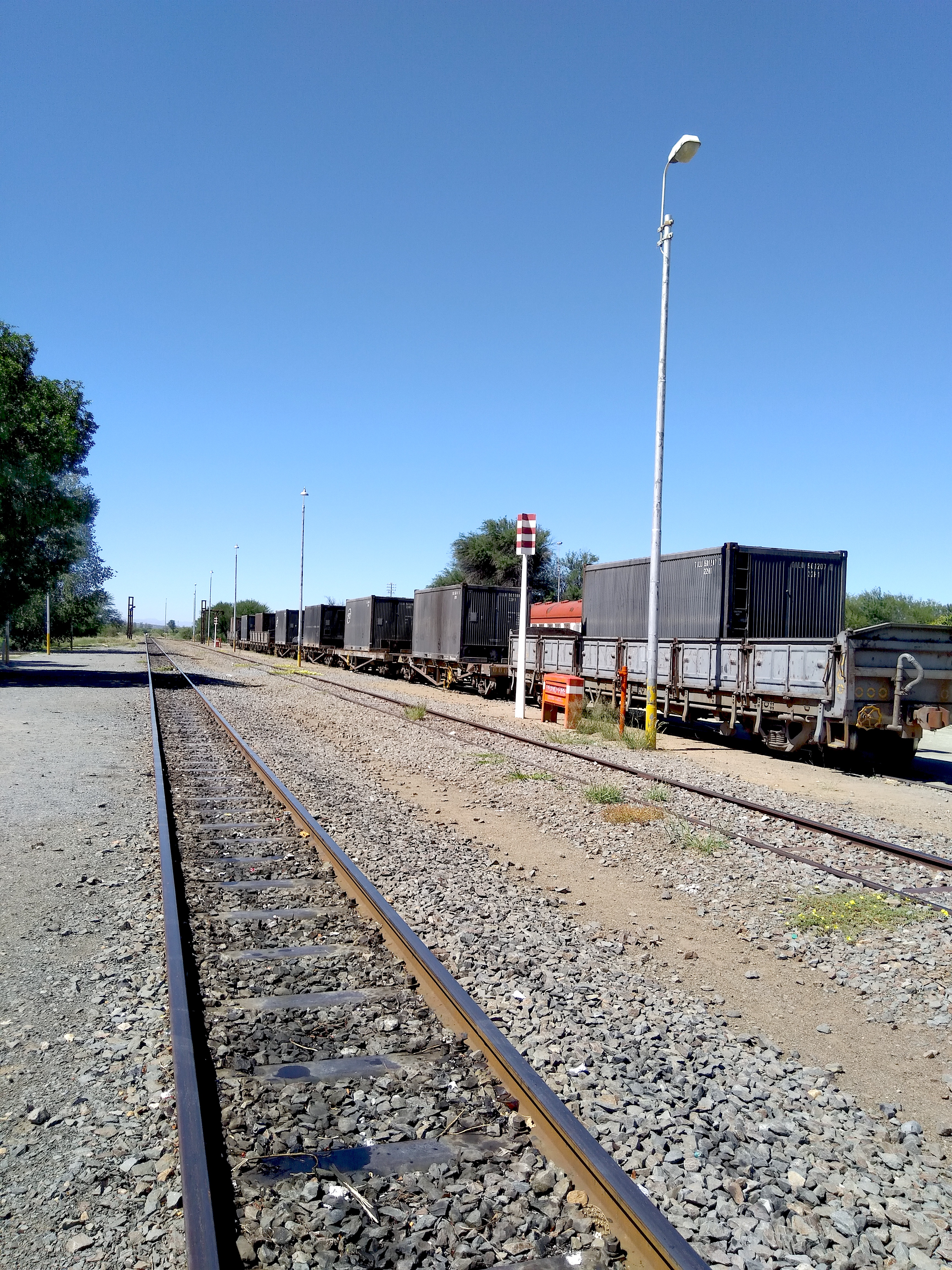
Okahandja railway station in 2018

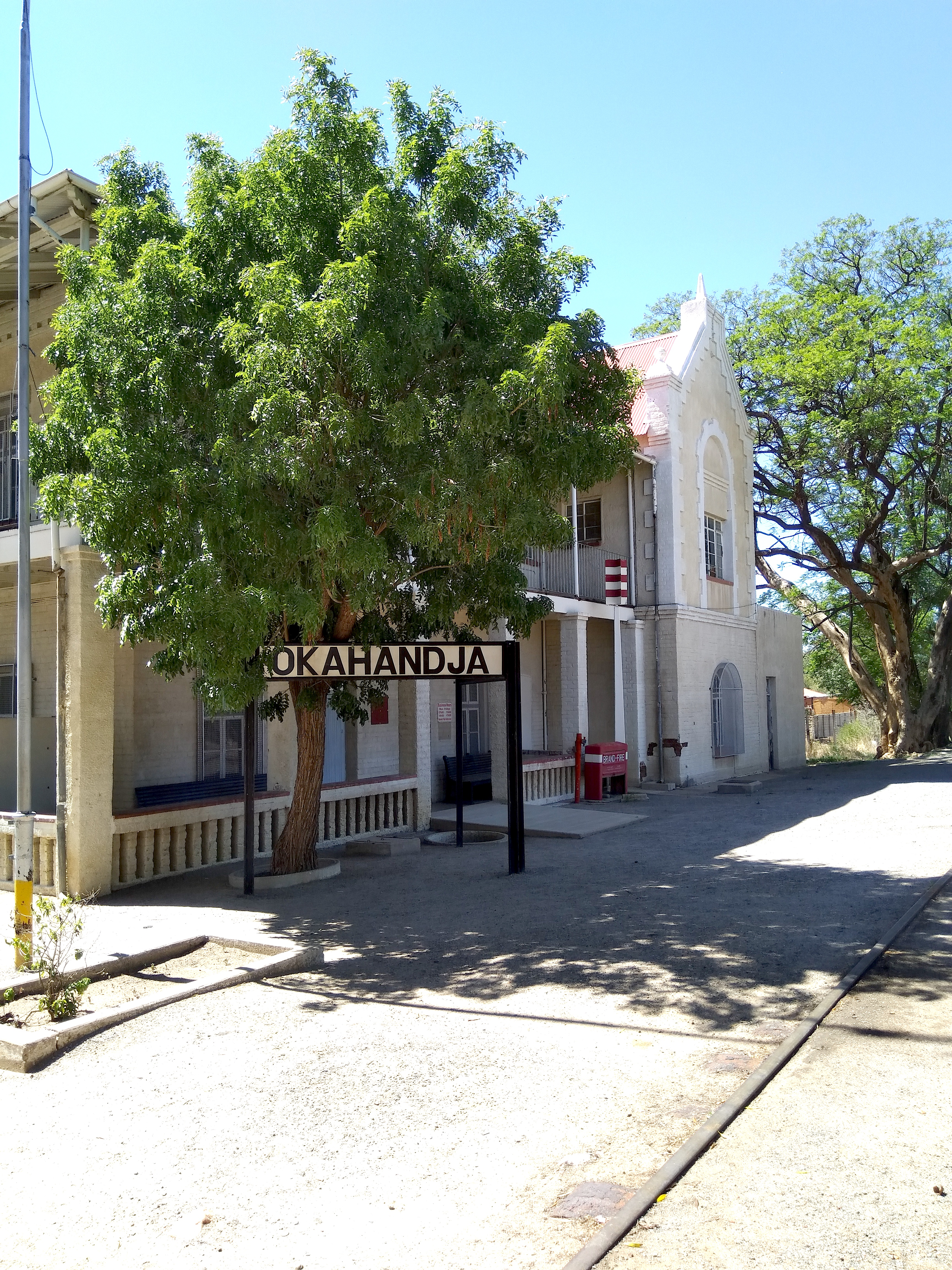
Okahandja railway station in 2018

== See also ==
- Rail transport in Namibia
