= Franz Heinrich Kleinschmidt =

German missionary and linguist (1812–1864)

- Born: 25 October 1812; Blasheim, today a suburb of Lübbecke
- Died: 2 September 1864; Otjimbingwe

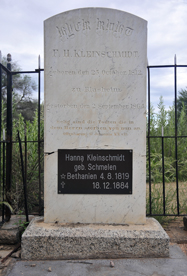
Grave Franz Heinrich Kleinschmidt in Otjimbingwe

Franz Heinrich Kleinschmidt (1812–1864) was a German missionary and linguist who worked in southern Africa, now in the region of Namibia. He founded the missionary station and town of Rehoboth and together with Carl Hugo Hahn set up the first Rhenish mission station to the Herero people in Gross Barmen. Kleinschmidt is known for his scientific work on the Nama language.

== Education and time in Cape Colony ==
Kleinschmidt was born on 25 October 1812 in the village of Blasheim, today a suburb of Lübbecke, then in the Kingdom of Prussia. He was a trained carpenter and blacksmith.

Kleinschmidt became a missionary with the Rhenish Missionary Society, which sent him to Southwestern Africa in response to the request of Jonker Afrikaner, chief of the Oorlam tribe residing there. He arrived in Windhoek in October 1842. When Wesleyan missionaries arrived in 1844, also at the invitation of Jonker Afrikaner, Kleinschmidt and his colleague Carl Hugo Hahn moved northwards into Damaraland in order to avoid conflict with them.

Hahn and Kleinschmidt arrived at Otjikango on 31 October 1844. They named the place Barmen (today Gross Barmen) after the headquarters of the Rhenish Missionary Society which was located in Barmen, Germany (today part of Wuppertal), and established the first Rhenish mission station to the Herero there. At that time Jonker Afrikaner oversaw the development of the road network in South-West Africa. Hahn and Kleinschmidt initiated the creation of a path from Windhoek to Barmen via Okahandja, and in 1850 this road, later known as Alter Baiweg (Old Bay Path), was extended via Otjimbingwe to Walvis Bay. This route served as an important trade connection between the coast and Windhoek until the end of the century.

Their missionary work was not very successful, and while Hahn visited Europe between 1853 and 1856 to gather support for his endeavors, Kleinschmidt moved back south to the Nama communities, where he founded the mission station and town of Rehoboth in 1845.

Kleinschmidt was fluent in Khoekhoegowab (also called Nama or Damara/Nama). Together with the missionary Vollmer he translated the Bible into this language in 1853 and published a Dutch–Nama dictionary in 1855.

In August 1864 Oorlams attacked Rehoboth. Kleinschmidt fled to Otjimbingwe but died there of exhaustion on 2 September 1864. He was married to Hanna née Schmelen, daughter of his colleague Heinrich Schmelen. His daughter Frieda married missionary Martti Rautanen in 1872.
