= Savola (surname) =

Savola is a Finnish surname. Notable people with the surname include:

- Albin Savola (1867–1934), Finnish Lutheran priest and missionary
- Elmo Savola (born 1995), Finnish athlete
- Mikko Savola (born 1981), Finnish politician
- Terttu Savola (born 1941), Finnish politician
