= Martti Rautanen =

Finnish missionary (1845–1926)

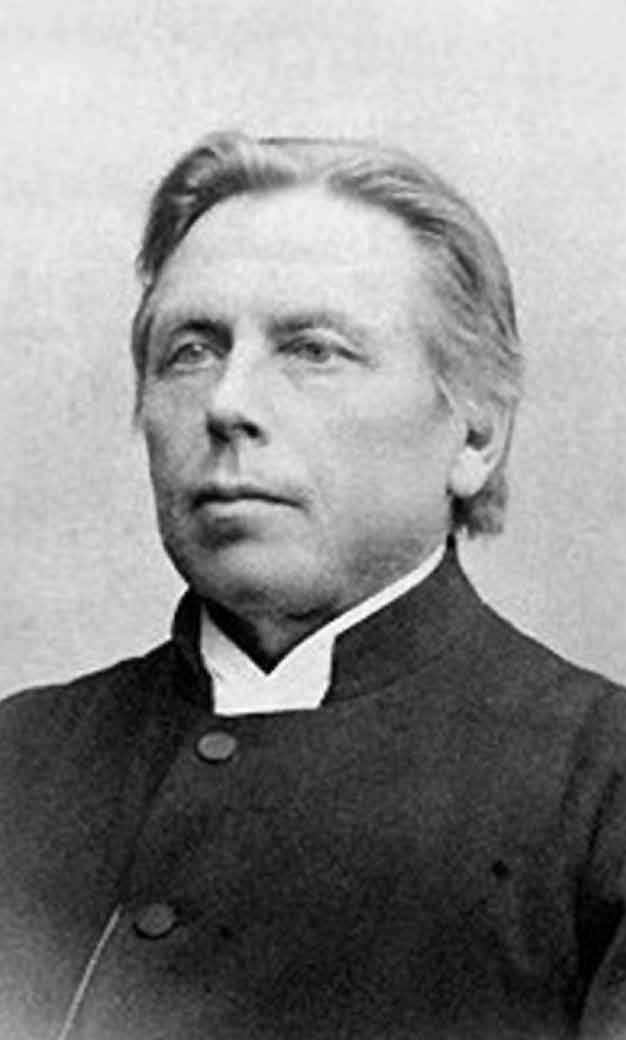
Martti Rautanen

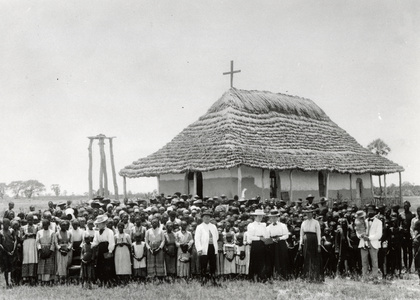
Martti Rautanen and the congregation at the missionary station in Olukonda, 1899.

Martti (Martin) Rautanen (10 November 1845 Tikopis (Russian: Тикопись), Ingria – 19 October 1926 Olukonda, South West Africa) was the pioneer of the Finnish Mission in Ovamboland, South West Africa.

== Childhood and education ==
Rautanen was born in a poor Finnish family in Ingria near St. Peterburg, Russia. Rautanen's family lived in the village of Tikanpesä in the parish of Novasolkka (Russian: Новоселки, romanized: Novoselki) in the Yamburgsky Uyezd of Saint Petersburg Governorate. The family originated from Joroinen in the province of Savo in Eastern Finland, but had moved to Ingria. Rautanen considered himself a Russian as he was born and living in Russia. Encouraged by the pastor of his church and his mother, Rautanen left Ingria in 1863 for Helsinki to study at the preparatory school for missionaries organized by the Finnish Missionary Society.

He spoke several languages included Finnish, English, German, Dutch, Russian, Latin and Greek; he later learned Otjiherero and Oshindonga.

== Missionary activities ==
Rautanen departed from Finland with four colleagues on 24 June 1868 towards Ovamboland in present-day Namibia. Initially they worked with Carl Hugo Hahn of the German Rhenish Mission Society. From Walvis Bay they travelled via Hereroland where they arrived in April 1869 and spent there over a year. Finally, they reached Ovamboland in July 1870. The Finnish missionaries managed to start work primarily in the southeastern territory of the Ondonga tribe. The first mission station was founded that year at Omandongo, moving to Olukonda the following year.

Rautanen worked in Ovamboland over 50 years acting as the director of a missionary station established in Olukonda in 1880, translating the Bible, and very patiently educating the local populations. The first local people to become pastors emerged in 1925.

== Literary work ==
Rautanen's literary work consisted of translation of hymns and the publication of a hymnal in 1892 in Ndonga. Rautanen also wrote poems which were used as texts for new hymns in Ovamboland. Rautanen started translating the Bible into Oshindonga in 1885. The New Testament was published in 1903, but it took until 1920 before the whole Old Testament was translated and it was not printed until 1954. Rautanen's 'testament' for the Ovamboland people was a selection of texts published posthumously with the title Travel Rod in 1934. Rautanen also wrote Luther's Smaller Chatechism.

== Scientific contributions ==
Rautanen was also active in the study of ethnography. He respected and gave great value to the indigenous culture. His ethnographic collection is now deposited in the National Museum of Finland. Rautanen's contribution to scientific knowledge concerning Ovamboland is also considerable. He made meteorological observations and collected plants. His interest in plants followed on the 1885–86 visit by the Swiss botanist Hans Schinz; Rautanen was inspired and became an enthusiastic collector of plants and ethnographic material, collections which were later assimilated by museums in Finland, Germany and South Africa. In turn Schinz was impressed by Rautanen and named the genus Neorautanenia and the mongongo nut tree Ricinodendron rautanenii after him, while the German botanist and authority on Lythraceae, Bernhard Koehne, commemorated him in Nesaea rautanenii.

== Nakambale ==
Shortly prior to his death, Rautanen received an honorary doctorate in theology from the University of Helsinki. The local people in Ovamboland called him Nakambale - "the one who wears the hat". He loved to wear a skullcap, which for the locals resembled a small basket - okambale. His nickname was written on his tombstone. Rautanen is a respected person in present-day Namibia as well.

His diaries are held at the University of Turku.

The family’s home in Olukonda is now the Nakambale Museum.

== Family ==
Rautanen married Frieda Kleinschmidt in 1872. She was the daughter of the German missionary Franz Heinrich Kleinschmidt; the couple had nine children, many of whom died at an early age due to malaria. Their daughter, Johanna was a teacher at Olukonda and died in 1966 at Onandjokwe.

== See also ==
Albin Savola

== Sources ==
- Matti Peltola: Martti Rautanen - Mies ja kaksi isänmaata. Kirjapaja, 1994.
- Matti Peltola: Nakambale, the life of Dr Martin Rautanen. Finnish Evangelical Lutheran Mission, 2002.
- Aapeli Saarisalo: Etelän ristin mies. WSOY, 1971. ISBN 951-0-03097-X
- Olli Löytty: Ambomaamme. Suomalaisen lähetyskirjallisuuden me ja muut. Vastapaino, 2006. ISBN 978-951-768-186-5
- NamibWeb.com - Olukonda (in English)
