= Gross Barmen =

Gross Barmen Otjikango (Otjiherero) Groß Barmen
- recreational area
- Location in Namibia
- Coordinates: 22°6′0″S 16°45′0″E
- Country: Namibia
- Region: Otjozondjupa Region
- Constituency: Okahandja Constituency
- Founded: 1844

Area
  - Total: 0.36 sq mi (0.93 km^{2})
- Time zone: UTC+1 (South African Standard Time)

Gross Barmen (German: Groß Barmen) is a historic settlement and a recreational spa on the Swakop River in central Namibia, north of Windhoek. It is situated on the District Road 1972, 25 km south-west of Okahandja in the Otjozondjupa Region. Its close proximity to the capital Windhoek makes it a popular weekend destination for locals.

== History ==
Originally known as Otjikango (Otjiherero: "large fountain"), the site was inhabited by the Herero people. When Wesleyan missionaries arrived in Windhoek in 1844 at the invitation of Jonker Afrikaner, Rhenish missionaries Carl Hugo Hahn and Franz Heinrich Kleinschmidt, already resident there since 1842, feared conflict and moved on to Otjikango. Here they established the first Rhenish mission station to the Herero in late 1844. They named the place Barmen after the town Barmen (today part of Wuppertal) in Germany where the headquarters of the Rhenish Missionary Society were located. The ruins of the missionary house are still visible.

At that time the road network in South West Africa was being developed under the supervision, and at the initiative, of Jonker Afrikaner. Hahn and Kleinschmidt initiated the creation of a path from Windhoek to Barmen via Okahandja, and in 1850 this road, later known as Alter Baiweg (Old Bay Path), was extended via Otjimbingwe to Walvis Bay. This route developed into an important trade connection between the coast and Windhoek and was in use until 1900, when the railway line from Swakopmund was commissioned.

Hahn taught Western farming techniques and tried to settle the Herero in Otjikango, but the Herero left the area to escape the recurrent attacks of Jonker Afrikaner's Nama in 1850, especially following his victory at Okahandja in August 1850. Hahn was ordered to report back to Germany, but he was reassigned to Kaapstad in November 1852. Since the Wesleyan missionaries had abandoned Windhoek to Jonker's raids, Hahn was hired to take their place but failed to secure it and arrived back in Barmen on September 13, 1853. In early 1856, he returned, but this time he settled in Otjimbingwe where the Herero had taken refuge.

The next Rhenish Missionary to settle in Gross Barmen was the Rev. Peter Heinrich Brincker. He married on February 10, 1864, and shortly after resumed the ministry at the station. He had to flee for his life from Nama attacks on the station no less than seven times, only to resettle it again. When the residents of the station finally fled in 1866, Brincker returned to Otjimbingwe, but a few months later he went back to Gross Barmen because the Eastern Herero, or Mbandjeru, had unexpectedly settled there. He had some success evangelizing to them, but was stymied when they left to join chief Maharero in Okahandja. Returning to Otjimbingwe once more, Brincker would be back in Gross Barmen in 1869, when the war was almost over. He set about immediately rebuilding the station, this time with a school and church. In the years following the so-called Peace of Okahandja (September 13, 1870), which the missionaries fostered for a decade, boasted 251 residents and 130 children attending the school. After a visit back to Germany in February 1880, Brincker returned to German South West Africa, but this time went instead to Otjimbingwe.

The mission station was operational until the start of Herero War in 1904, but was destroyed by Herero insurgents. The settlement also had a police station at that time, and a military fort which was demolished during the uprising. The village was destroyed by burning by German colonial troops under the command of Leutnant Eugen Mansfeld on 17 February 1904.

== Hot springs ==
The recreational centre at Gross Barmen was built in 1977. The water of the hot spring comes from a depth of 2,500 m. It exits the ground at 65 °C and is cooled down to around 40 °C for the thermal bath.

Gross Barmen is managed by Namibia Wildlife Resorts (NWR), the company responsible for all national parks and official recreational areas in Namibia. Besides the thermal bath it featured a petrol station, a restaurant, and overnight accommodation until 2010 but became the biggest loss maker of NWR. It is now in a period of reconstruction and expansion and was scheduled to be reopened in 2013.

== Literature ==
- De Kock, W.J. (1968). (af)Suid-Afrikaanse biografiese woordeboek, part I. Pretoria: Nasionale Raad vir Sosiale Navorsing, Departement van Hoër Onderwys (National Network for Social Research, Department of Higher Education).
- "Namibiana.de".
- Mansfeld, Eugen (2017). The Autobiography of Eugen Mansfeld: A Settler's Life in Colonial Namibia. London: Jeppestown Press. ISBN 978-0-9570837-5-2.
- Vedder, Heinrich (1997). Das alte Südwestafrika. Südwestafrikas Geschichte bis zum Tode Mahareros 1890 [The old South West Africa. South West Africa's history until Maharero's death 1890] (in German) (7th ed.). Windhoek: Namibia Scientific Society. ISBN 0-949995-33-9.
