= Bethel Mission, German East Africa =

Religious organization

The Bethel Mission, also known as Berlin III, Evangelische Missionsgesellschaft für Deutsch-Ostafrika (EMDOA), or Berliner Evangelische Missionsgesellschaft für Ostafrika was a Berlin-based Protestant mission initiated by Karl Peters in German East Africa with a uniert religious doctrine. From its founding in 1886 until 1891 the mission was limited to the Indian Ocean coast; it was then led by Friedrich von Bodelschwingh, Senior of the Bethel Institution.

In October 1905 the society created Mkoma Mbuli (The Storyteller), a Shambala monthly, which probably continued publication until 1914.

In 1971, the Bethel Mission and the Rhenish Missionary Society were combined into the Vereinte Evangelische Mission.
