= Hester Needham (author) =

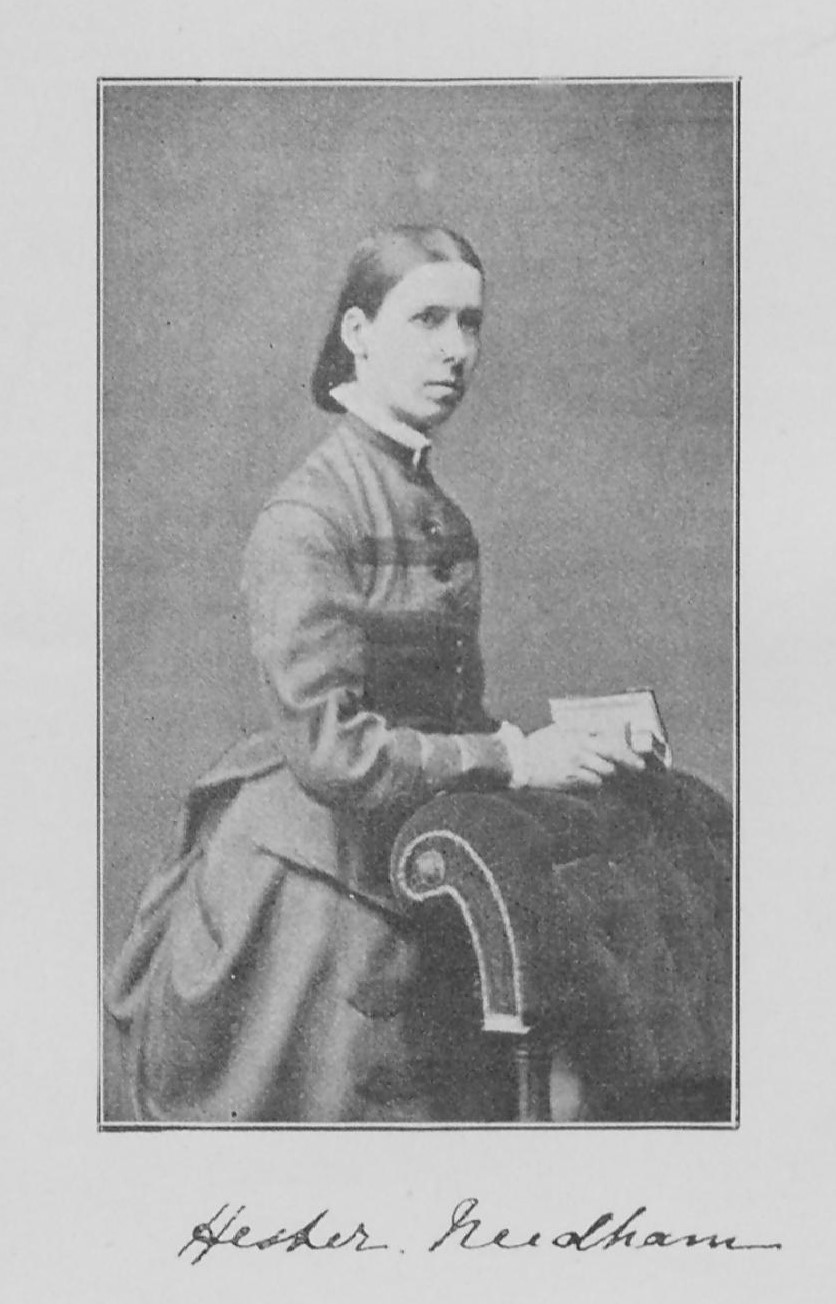
- Hester Needham in 1874 and her signature
- Born: 23 January 1843; London, England, United Kingdom
- Died: 12 May 1897; Maga, Mandailing, Tapanuli, Dutch East Indies
- Occupation: Missionary ∙ Travel writer
- Era: Victorian era
- Notable work: God First or Hester Needham's work in Sumatra
- Relatives: William Needham (father); Camilla Bosanquet (mother)

Hester Needham (23 January 1843 - 12 May 1897) was a British missionary and travel writer. She is known for the posthumous publication of God First or Hester Needham's work in Sumatra, a travel book published in 1899. A copy is part of one of the Special Collections of Maastricht University. It is the only known book written by a female missionary in Indonesia during those times. The book comprises Needham's letters and diaries, arranged by Mary Enfield. It also includes a preface by Sarah Geraldine Stock and a chapter about the author's biography. Needham stayed in Sumatra from 1889 to 1897, where she died. She traveled there to take part in the missionary work of the Rhenish Missionary Society as the first evangelist woman of the mission.

== Early life ==
Needham lived during the Victorian era of British history and practiced Evangelicalism. For a brief period, she attended a school in Weston-super-Mare. In London, from her mid-twenties onward, she covered different duties associated with her church, such as visiting St George's Hospital to school-teaching on Sundays. In 1873, she started a small branch of the YWCA, a women’s organisation emblematic of the so-called Social Gospel: the idea that social progress is God's blessing. As part of the branch, she opened the Princess House in London in 1878. The building served as a living and education facility for young women.

Evangelicalism was the foundational tenet of missionary societies. Especially combined with Victorian revivalism, the process of Christianizing the non-Christians in the colonies came mainly from the British population. Missionary societies received particular attention and funding, and women contributed to their activities. In the beginning, they played only a symbolic function and were often seen as the domicile wives of the male missionaries. Female missionaries started to be increasingly needed in the colonies because they were thought to be more appropriate to teach and civilize other women.

In the late 1880s, the Rhenish Missionary Society sought female evangelists to join missionary projects internationally. In 1888, Schreiber, one of its principal ministers, went to a conference in London. Needham attended the conference and decided to join. She was sent to Sumatra.

== Her work in Sumatra ==
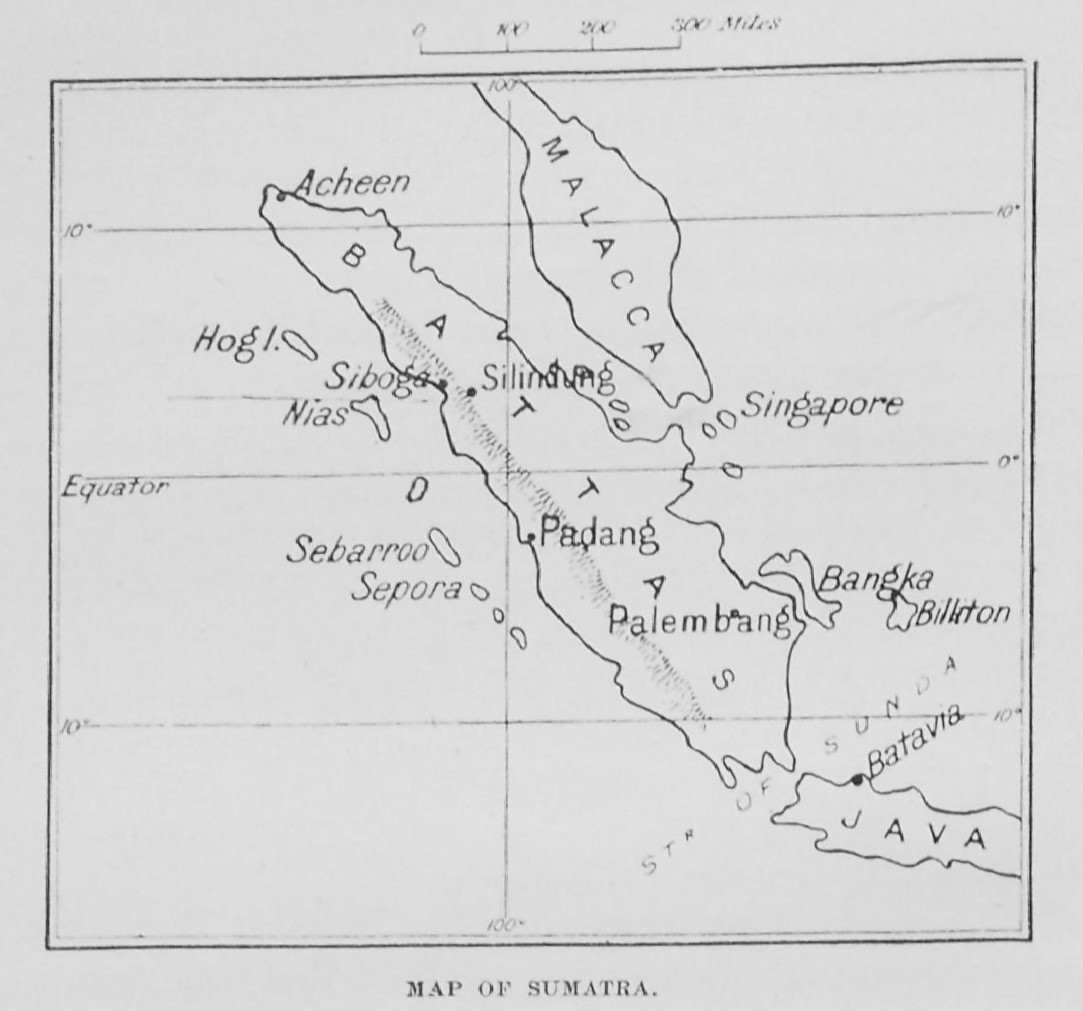
Map of Sumatra from the book

In December 1889, she landed in Sibolga and some days later she arrived at the missionary station in Pansur Napitu, in North Sumatra, north of Padangsidempuan. Throughout her stay in Sumatra, she undertook several occupations, mainly revolving around the religious conversion of the local people, the Batak, to Christianity. She held several Bible classes per week and she held meetings and classes especially for women as sometimes for children too. Once she learned the local language, she helped to translate the Bible into the local language and she preached. She engaged in philanthropic activities: she helped the local people affected by leprosy or by poverty and she helped the blind Bataks.

In March 1891, the Princess House of Pansur Napitu opened. She funded its construction and, once opened, she lived there while managing the house and holding meeting and classes there. In the spring of 1892, several earthquakes hit the island. She started collecting money and food for the most severely hit Sangir Island. In January 1893, she moved to Sipoholon, a bigger village where more conversion work was needed. One year later, a second Princess House opened where she worked until June 1895.

In June 1895, Needham moved to another region of Sumatra where the Mandailing people live. After a long journey, which lasted two months, she settled in Muara Sipongi. In the spring of 1896, she moved to Malintang, south of Padangsidempuan. She was also appointed as the superintendent of Bartimeus, a local man, for the British and Foreign Bible Society. In December 1896, she moved to Maga where she was hosted by the local sultan. On 12 May 1897, she died in Maga in Mandailing. The cause of death is unknown but the last illness she had was dropsy.

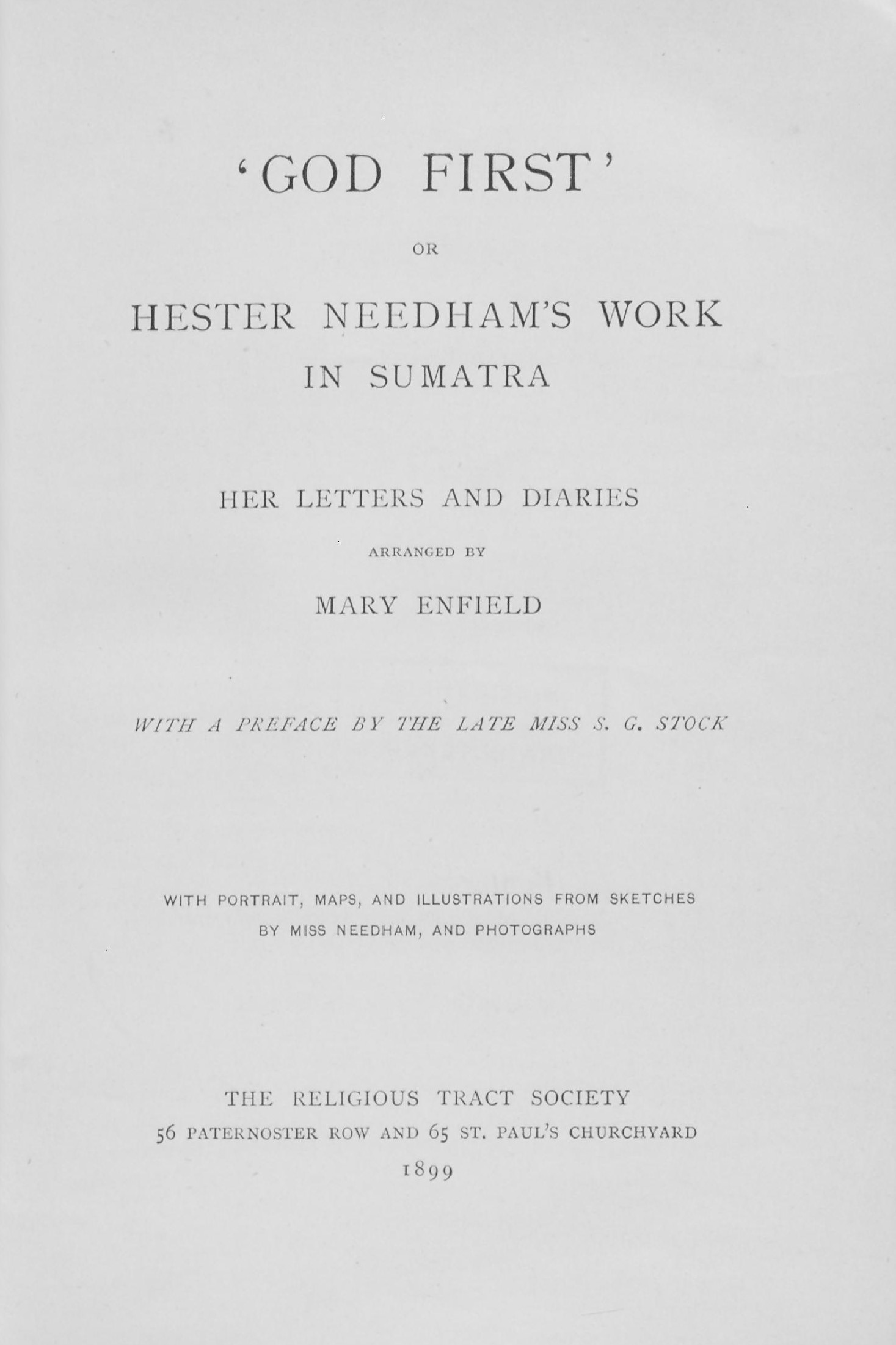
Title page of God First.

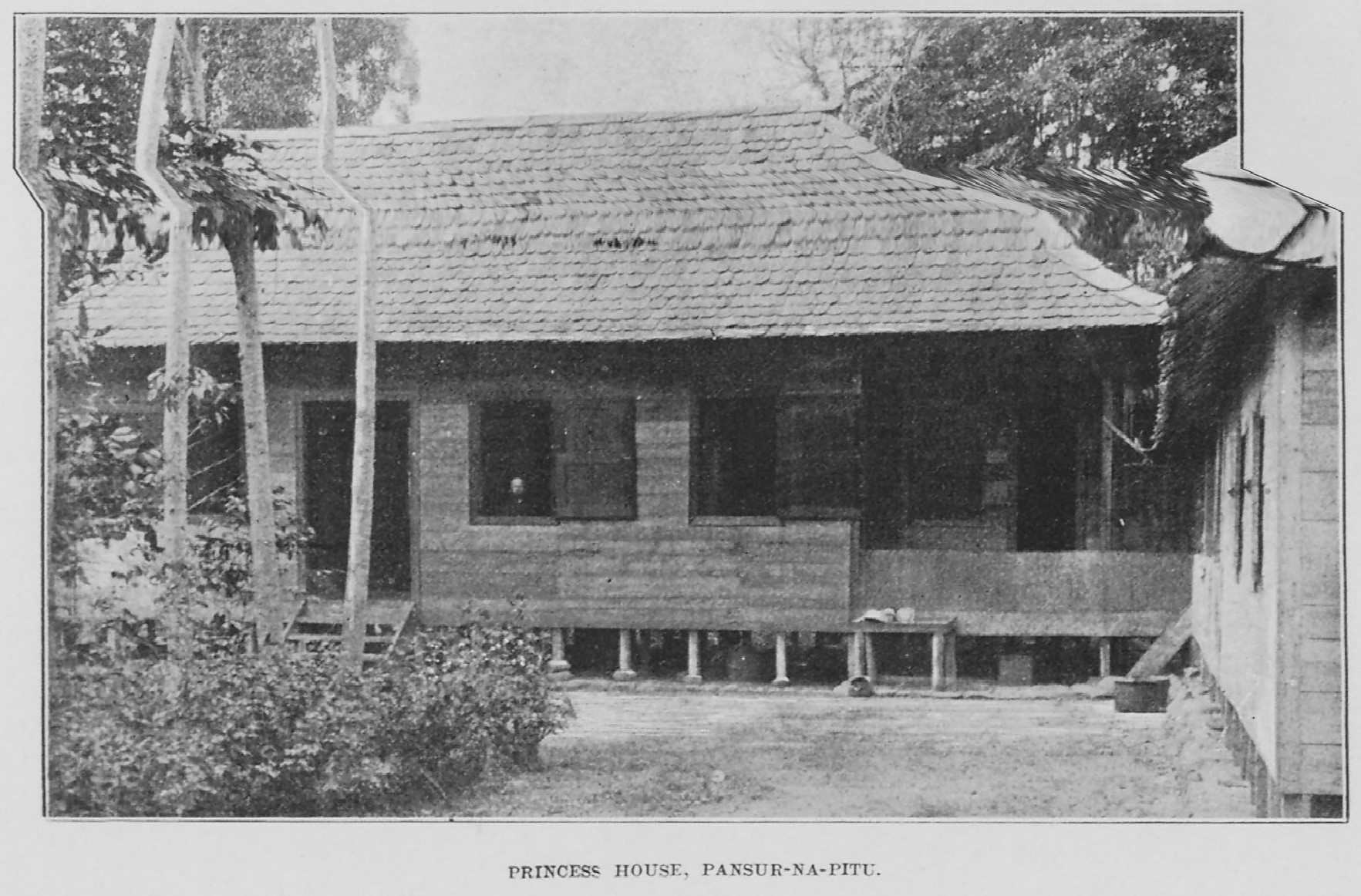
Photo of Princess House in Pansur Napitu.

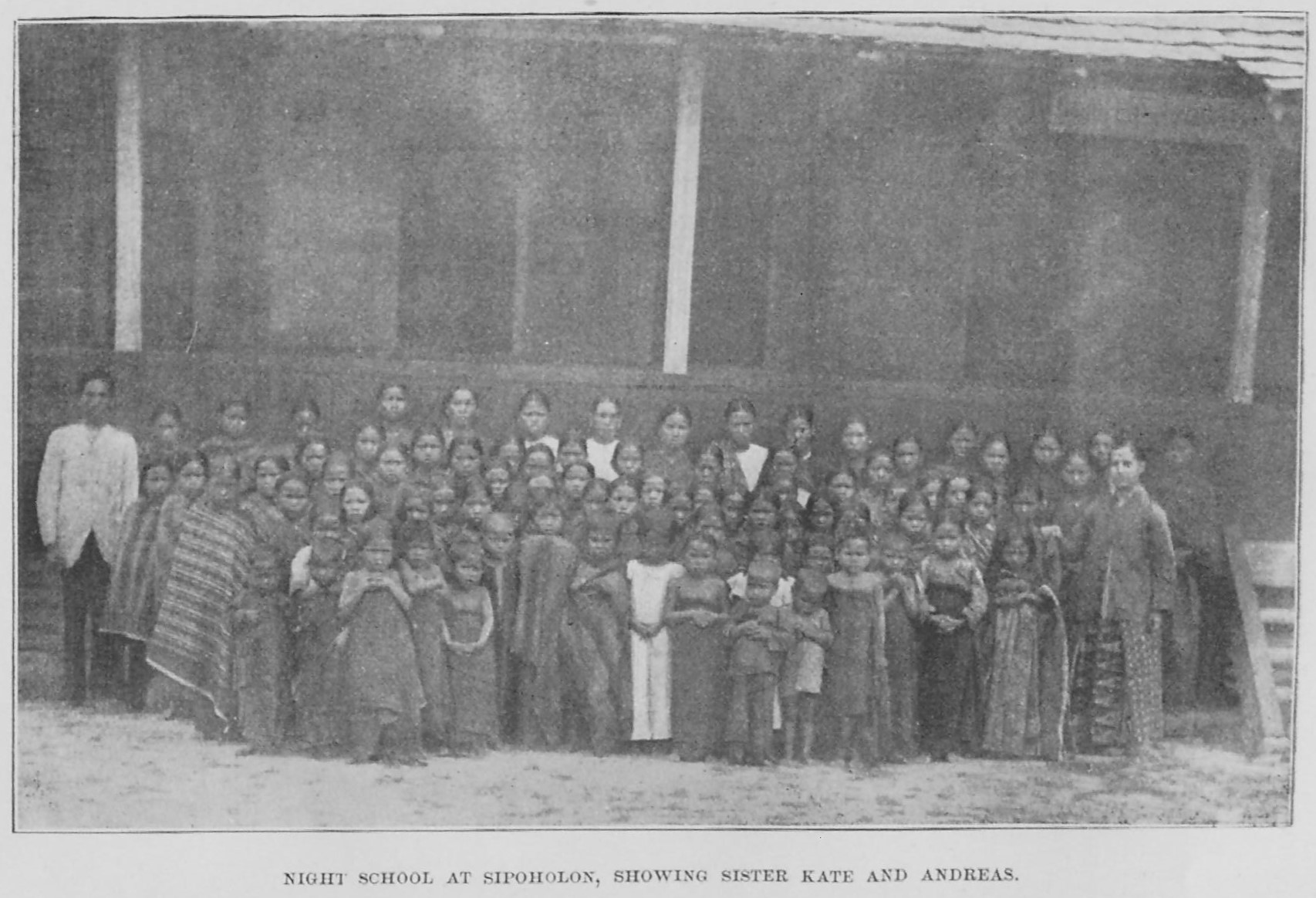
The night school at Sipoholon, showing sister Kate and Andreas.

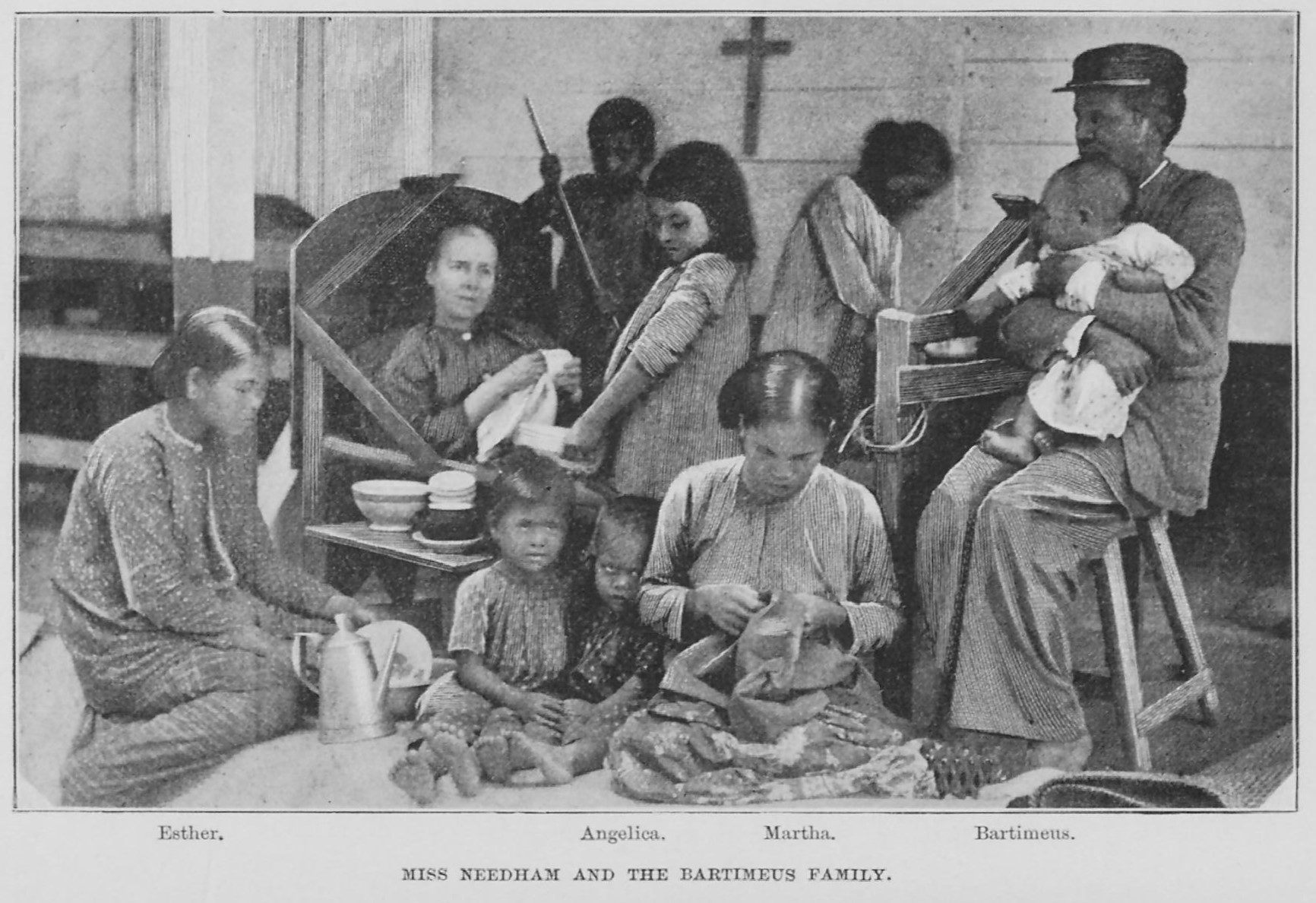
Picture of Needham and a local Christian family in Maga, Mandailing.
