= Albin Savola =

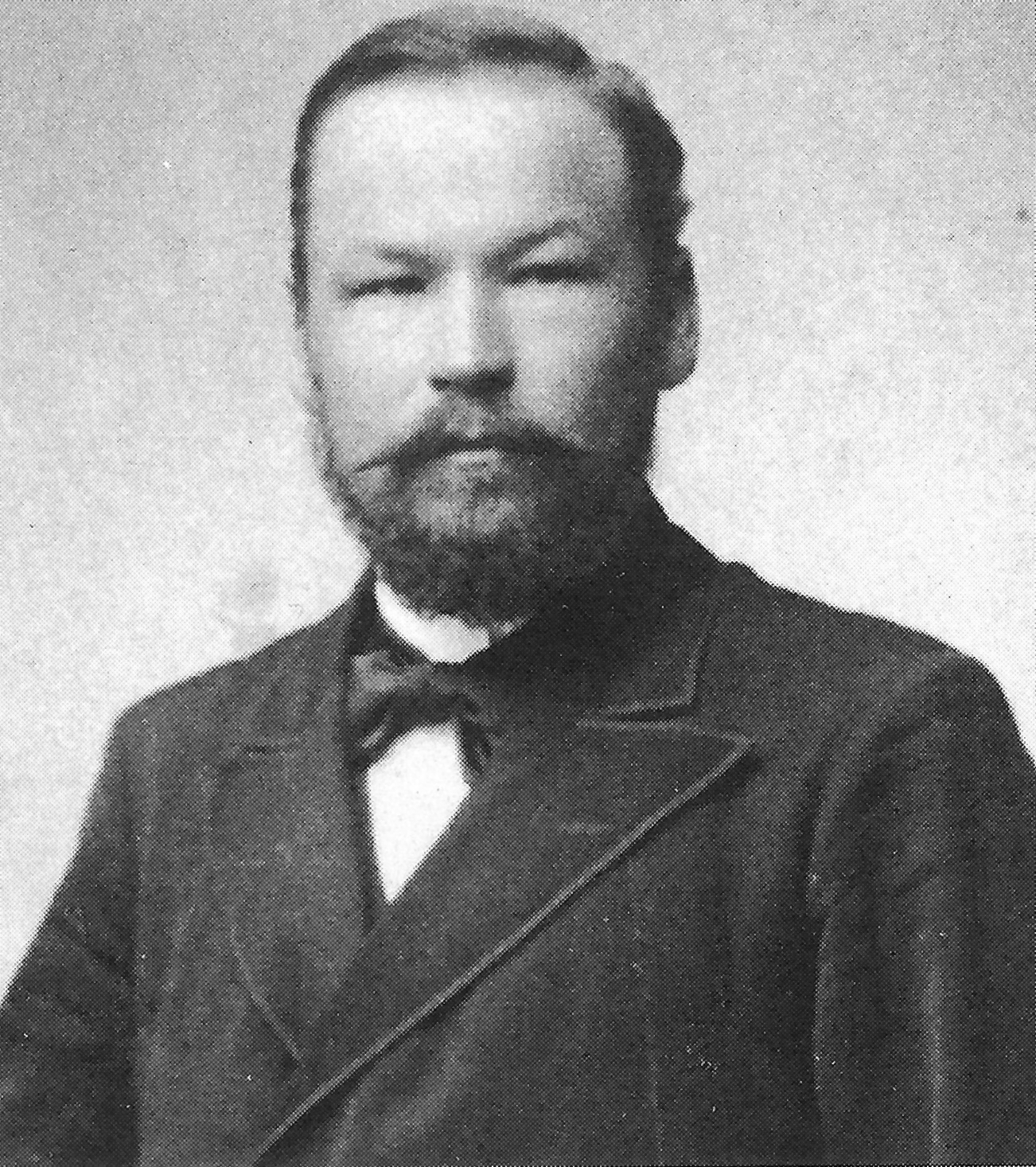
Albin Savola

Albin Savola (26 July 1867, Sulkava – 8 December 1934, Forssa) was a Finnish priest and missionary, who served as one of the first Finnish missionaries in Ovamboland and published literature in the Oshindonga language.

== Life stages ==
Savola was born in Sulkava Kaipola village into a miller's family. His father was Abraham Popoff and his mother was Leena Kaisa Karppinen.

In 1890 Savola started the Finnish Evangelical Lutheran Mission missionary school. From the school he was sent mission field, where he arrived in 1893. Savola worked at the Oniipa missionary station; as a layman, he was assigned the task of developing cotton cultivation in Ovamboland and fabric production.

Savola became engaged to Eedla Nikkinen, who travelled to Ovamboland in 1896. The couple were married immediately upon arrival in Namibia. After Eedla’s death in 1898, Savola returned to Finland in 1900 and married her sister Maria Nikkinen. Savola returned with to Ovamboland with Maria, where they had three children.

During his second term in Ovamboland, Savola set up the first printing house in Ovamboland, starting the publication of the Journal Osondaha on 15 October 1901. He also wrote the first biography of Martti Rautanen while staying in Ovamboland.

In 1908, Savola transferred to the USA, where he served as pastor of the Finnish Lutheran church in Michigan Covington. From there he returned to Finland in 1912 where he studied theology and became Forssa parish vicar until the end of his life. At that time he identified himself with the Lapua Movement.

== Major works ==
- Skoglund, GM & Alb. Savola (1903). Omahokololo gom 'Ombibeli: ga ńoolua. Helsinki.
- Savola, Alb. (1908). Ošindongan grammar. Helsinki.
- Savola, Alb. et al. (1914). Omahokololo gooramata pasindonga. Finnish Evangelical Lutheran Mission, Helsinki.
- Savola, Alb. (1916). Ham's tents, or in ondonga and its people. Finnish Evangelical Lutheran Mission, Helsinki.
- Savola, Alb. (1917). The black child's life for the children. Finnish Evangelical Lutheran Mission, Helsinki.
- Savola, Alb. (1924). Ovamboland and its people. 2nd edition. Finnish Evangelical Lutheran Mission, Helsinki.
- Savola, Alb. (1927). Martti Rautanen. Finnish Evangelical Lutheran Mission, Helsinki.
- Savola, Alb. (1927). Martin Rautanen. Transl. Marta A. Renvall. Helsinki.

== Sources ==
- Elina Ojala (1990). Selma Rainio (1873–1939) Afrikan lääkärilähetyksen perustajana ja vaikuttajana Ambomaalla [‘Selma Rainio (1873–1939) as the founder of [Finnish] medical mission in Africa and as shaper of the mission work in Ovamboland’] (in Finnish). Master’s thesis in church history. Helsinki University.
- Peltola, Matti (1958). Sata vuotta suomalaista lähetystyötä 1859–1959. II: Suomen Lähetysseuran Afrikan työn historia [‘A Hundred Years of Finnish Missionary Work. 1859–1959. II: The FMS in Africa’] (in Finnish). Helsinki: Agricola-seura.
