= Augustineum Secondary School =

High school in Windhoek, Namibia

- Khomasdal North, Windhoek; Namibia

Information
- Former name: Augustineum Training College
- Type: Public secondary school
- Established: 1866
- School district: Khomasdal, Windhoek
- Principal: Rudof Matengu
- Faculty: 41
- Grades: 8–12
- Enrollment: 1 000
- Colors: Black, white
- Website: www.facebook.com/Augustineum

The Augustineum Secondary School, established in 1866, is among the oldest schools in Namibia. Originally situated in Otjimbingwe, it was relocated to Okahandja in 1890, and finally to Windhoek in 1968. Previously also known as the Augustineum Training College, it today is a public school located in Khomasdal, a suburb of Windhoek.

== History ==
Missionary Carl Hugo Hahn established the Augustineum as a seminary and teacher training college in Otjimbingwe in 1866. The name was chosen from Augustine of Hippo, "father of the church in Africa". In 1890 the institution had 14 students and was led by missionary Gottlieb Viehe. In this year it was moved from Otjimbingwe to Okahandja.

December 1959 saw a student uprising at Augustineum, caused by the Old Location Uprising in Windhoek. Hidipo Hamutenya was a notable participant. In 1968 the Augustineum was shifted to Windhoek.

== Current state ==
In 2013 the Augustineum was the sixth worst performing school in the country.

== Notable alumni ==
- Niko Bessinger, National Hero, first minister of Wildlife, Conservation and Tourism
- Dawid Boois, governor of ǁKaras Region
- Faustina Caley, deputy minister of education, arts and culture (class of 1978)
- Justus ǁGaroëb, king of the Damara people and opposition politician
- Hage Geingob, second president of Namibia and former prime minister (1990-2002)
- Godfrey Gaoseb, special advisor on economics in the Namibian government (2001-2012)
- Theo-Ben Gurirab, second prime minister of Namibia (2002-2005). Former president of the United Nations General Assembly (1999-2000) and speaker of the National Assembly of Namibia (2005-2015)
- Hidipo Hamutenya, former leader of the opposition party Rally for Democracy and Progress
- Panduleni Itula, dentist and opposition politician
- Johannes Isaaks, first mayor of Gibeon (1960s)
- Joel Kaapanda, diplomat and SWAPO politician
- Muesee Kazapua, in 2014 mayor of Windhoek
- Peter Katjavivi, speaker of the National Assembly of Namibia
- Rosa Namises, human rights activist and former parliamentarian for the Congress of Democrats (1999-2005 and 2009-2010)
- Immanuel Ngatjizeko, member of cabinet
- John Ya-Otto, teacher, trade unionist, politician, author and diplomat
- Mose Penaani Tjitendero (1943–2006), former Deputy Prime Minister and first Speaker of Parliament, National Hero of Namibia
- Tjama Tjivikua, former Rector of the Namibia University of Science and Technology
- Mike Venaani (born 1950), former secretary general of the Democratic Turnhalle Alliance and current MP for the Popular Democratic Movement

== See also ==
- Education in Namibia
- List of schools in Namibia
