= Mike Venaani =

Namibian politician and farmer

Mike Venaani MP

Member of the National Assembly of Namibia
- Incumbent
- Assumed office 6 June 2022

Personal details
- Born: Mike Rapuikua Venaani; 13 September 1950 (age 75) Okatjoruu, South West Africa
- Party: Popular Democratic Movement
- Spouse: Lydia (died 2004)
- Children: McHenry
- Education: Augustineum Training College
- Occupation: Farmer; politician

Mike Rapuikua Venaani (born 13 September 1950) is a Namibian politician and farmer who has represented the Popular Democratic Movement in the National Assembly of Namibia since June 2022. He is the father of party leader McHenry Venaani.

== Early life and career ==
Venaani was born on 13 September 1950 in Okatjoruu, South West Africa. He attended the Augustineum Training College. He has worked as a farmer and has been involved in politics since 1969. Venaani formerly served as the Secretary-General of the Democratic Turnhalle Alliance which was later renamed to the Popular Democratic Movement, of which his son, McHenry, is currently party leader.

== Parliamentary career ==
Venaani stood as a candidate for the National Assembly on the PDM list in the 2019 general election and was elected to a seat in the National Assembly. However, after the election, the PDM amended its list of candidates nominated to the National Assembly which saw Venaani and five other candidates being removed. Charmaine Tjirare and Hidipo Hamata, who were removed from the party list as well, subsequently approached the Electoral Court to have the amended list be declared invalid and for them to be sworn in as MPs; the court ruled in their favour on 13 July 2020, ruling that political parties cannot amend their candidate lists after the election and before the candidates are sworn in as members of the National Assembly.

The PDM and the Electoral Commission appealed the judgement in the Supreme Court and lost on 30 May 2022 after the court dismissed their appeals. The court ordered the six PDM MPs, who were added on the amended list, to vacate their seats in the National Assembly immediately in order for Venaani and the five other PDM members who were duly elected at the election to be sworn in. Venaani and the five other PDM members were sworn in as MPs on 6 June 2022. In March 2023, it was revealed that Venaani and the five other MPs wrote a letter to the secretary of National Assembly Lydia Kandetu on 14 February 2023 demanding that they receive back pay from the National Assembly backdated to 20 March 2020, when the current National Assembly was convened, as well as pension-related proceeds which were deducted from their predecessors.

== Personal life ==
Venaani was married to Lydia until her death in 2004.
