= Okahandja Constituency =

Electoral constituency in the Otjozondjupa region of Namibia

Coordinates: 21°59′S 16°55′E

Okahandja constituency (red) in the Otjozondjupa Region

Okahandja Constituency is an electoral constituency in the Otjozondjupa Region of Namibia. It had 18,155 inhabitants in 2004 and 18,109 registered voters in 2020. The constituency consists of the town of Okahandja and the surrounding rural area.

== Politics ==
Okahandja is traditionally a stronghold of the South West Africa People's Organization (SWAPO) party. In the 2004 regional election, SWAPO candidate Theofelus Eiseb received 2,677 of the 4,498 votes cast and became councillor.

The 2015 regional election was won by Steve Biko Booys of SWAPO with 3,280 votes, followed by Sophia Basson of the Democratic Turnhalle Alliance (DTA) with 763 votes. Independent candidate Welfriedt Groeitjie Goaseb gained 501 votes.

The SWAPO candidate also won the 2020 regional election. Bethuel Tjaveondja received 2,451 votes, well ahead of Frisia Ambondja of the Independent Patriots for Change (IPC), a party formed in August 2020, who obtained 1,057 votes. There also ran Belinda Garoes of the United Democratic Front (UDF, 599 votes), Willem Veiko of the Popular Democratic Movement (PDM, the new name of the DTA, 350 votes), and Tjitee Mujoro of the Landless People's Movement (LPM, a new party registered in 2018, 332 votes).
