= Okahandja =

Okahandja Khoekhoe: Kaiǁkhaes
- City
- Motto: Semper Prorsum
- Location in Namibia
- Coordinates: 21°59′S 16°55′E
- Country: Namibia
- Region: Otjozondjupa Region
- Constituency: Okahandja constituency
- Town: 1894

Area
  - Total: 229 km^{2} (88 sq mi)

Population (2023 census)
  - Total: 45,182
  - Density: 197/km^{2} (511/sq mi)
- Time zone: UTC+2 (SAST)
- Climate: BSh

Okahandja is a city of 45,182 inhabitants in Otjozondjupa Region, central Namibia, and the district capital of the Okahandja electoral constituency. It is known as the Garden Town of Namibia. It is located 70 km north of Windhoek on the B1 road. It was founded around 1800, by two local groups, the Herero and the Nama.

== History ==
In the Herero language, Okahandja means the place where two rivers converge, with the two rivers being the Okakango and the Okamita.

A German pastor, Heinrich Schmelen, became the first European to visit the town in 1827. In 1844, two missionaries were permanently assigned to the town, Heinrich Kleinschmidt and Hugo Hahn. A church dates from this period. A military post was established at the initiative of Theodor Leutwein in 1894, and it is this date that is officially recognized as the town's founding.

A number of important historic Namibian people are buried in Okahandja, among them Maharero, Jan Jonker Afrikaner, Hosea Kutako and Clemens Kapuuo.

== Economy and infrastructure ==
The population of Okahandja is growing rapidly. It stood at just over 14,000 as measured by the 2001 Population and Housing Census, and stood at over 45,000 in 2023.

Historical population
Year	Pop.	±% p.a.
2001	14,039	—
2011	22,639	+4.89%
2023	45,182	+5.93%

Von Bach Dam is situated outside of Okahandja. It provides the majority of Windhoek's water. An open-air curio market attracts tourists, and the town serves as the administrative centre for the Herero people.

=== Transport ===
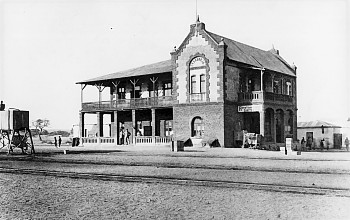
Okahandja Railway Station, 1902

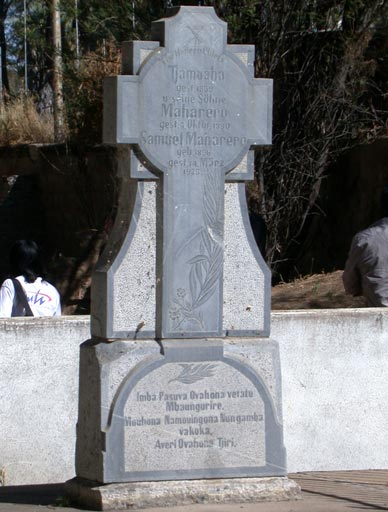
Monument to Herero Chiefs: Gravestone of Tjamuaha, Maharero, and Samuel Maharero

Okahandja Railway Station, situated on the Windhoek—Swakopmund line, was built in 1902 during Imperial Germany's colonial rule of German South West Africa. Today it belongs to the Trans-Namib railway network.

== Education ==
In the 1870s Rhenish missionaries established the first school. The Augustineum School was reopened at Okahandja on 9 November 1905; it was later moved to Windhoek. Today Okahandja has six primary schools and two high schools, among them Okahandja Secondary School. Namwater Vocational, situated outside the main town, is the only institute of higher education in Okahandja.

The National Institute for Educational Development (NIED) is today situated in Okahandja. NIED was created after independence as the institute from where a new national system of education was created, replacing the previous racist system of apartheid.

Previously the German school Regierungsschule Okahandja was in the city.

== Politics ==
Okahandja is governed by a municipal council that has seven seats.

The first local election run after Namibian independence, the 1992 local elections, was won by SWAPO which obtained 1,954 votes and gained four seats. The Democratic Turnhalle Alliance (DTA) came second with 1,207 votes and three seats. The 1998 local authority elections saw a similar result. SWAPO won and gained four seats (817 votes), the DTA gained two seats (436 votes). The local Okahandja Rate Payers' Association (ORPA) gained the remaining seat with 279 votes.

In the 2010 local authority election in Okahandja, SWAPO won with approximately 62% of the vote. Of the five other parties seeking votes in the election, Rally for Democracy and Progress (RDP) received approximately 13% of the vote, followed by the United Democratic Front (UDF, 8%), the United People's Movement (UPM, 7%), National Unity Democratic Organization (NUDO, 6%) and DTA (2%). The 2015 local authority election was again won by SWAPO which gained five seats and 2,572 votes. One seat each went to the DTA and the UDF with 236 and 213 votes, respectively.

SWAPO also won the 2020 local authority election but lost its absolute majority in the municipal council. It obtained 1,865 votes and gained three seats. One seat each went to the Independent Patriots for Change (IPC, an opposition party formed in August 2020, 654 votes), ORPA (574 votes), the Landless People's Movement (LPM, an opposition party formed in 2016, 377 votes), and the UDF (290 votes).

== Sport ==
Okahandja United FC competes in the Namibia Premier Football League as of the 2023. The oldest soccer club in town is known as Spoilers Sports Club that was founded in 1963 and managed over the years by "Ou Boss" Reinhardt Maletzky. In the 1970s, Okahandja Soccer Club had a competitive football team that won several competitions.

In addition, local club Liverpool Okahandja were NFA-Cup winners in 1992 and Namibia Premier League champions in 2002. Other local teams were Magic Tigers, Battle Boys, Teenagers, Golden Arrows.

== See also ==
- Vyf Rand
