= Rhenish Missionary Society =

Protestant missionary society in Germany

The Rhenish Missionary Society (Rhenish – of the river Rhine; German: Rheinische Missionsgesellschaft, RMG) was one of the largest Protestant missionary societies in Germany. Formed from smaller missions founded as far back as 1799, the Society was amalgamated on 23 September 1828.

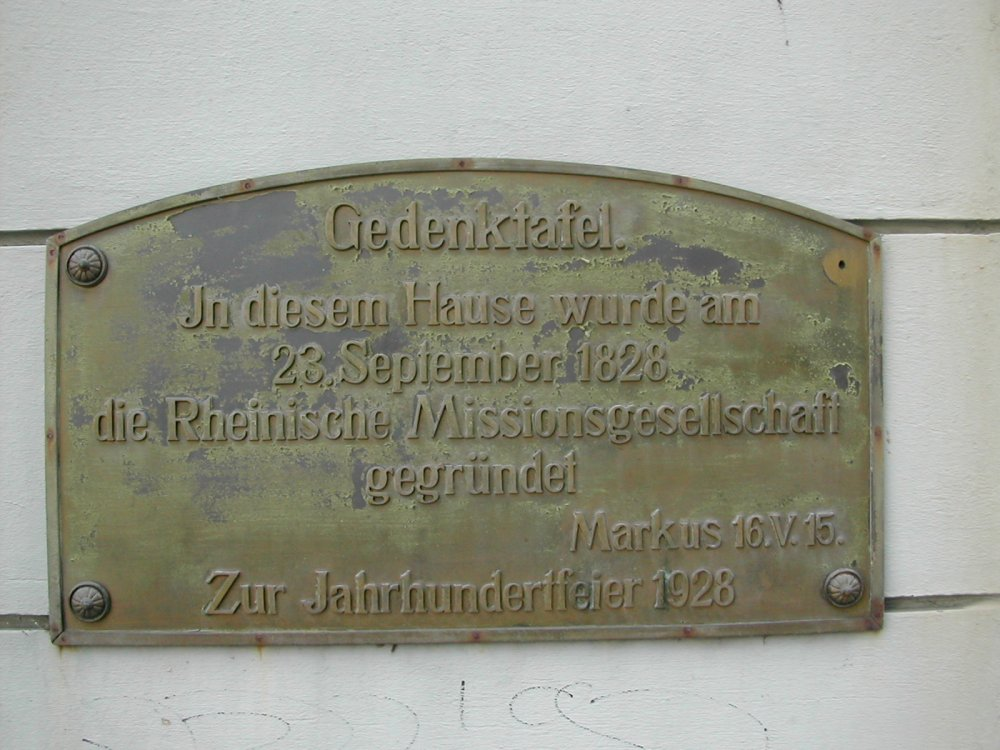
Commemorative plaque in Mettmann marking the founding of the Rhenish Missionary Society

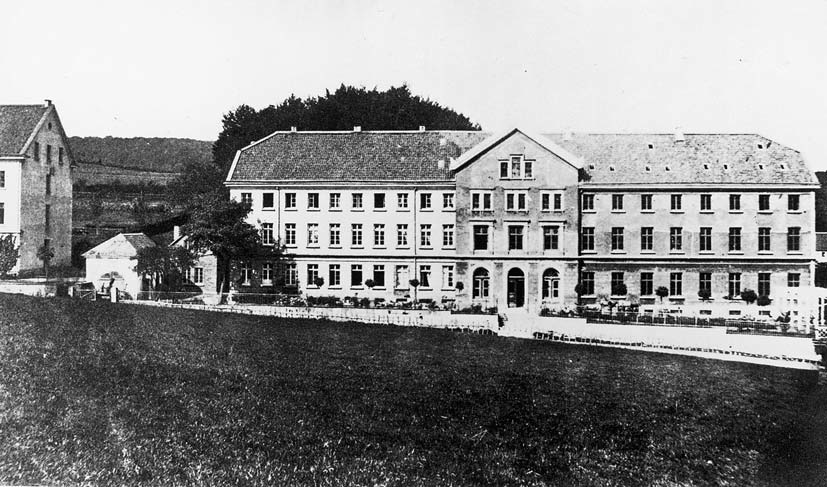
Mission house in Barmen, circa 1872

== History ==
=== 19th century ===
==== South Africa ====
Its first missionaries were ordained and sent off to South Africa by the end of its first year.

The London Missionary Society was already active in the area, and a closer working relationship was formed with them. The Society established its first mission station in the Cederberg in 1829, named Wupperthal, and predated the naming of the German city by 100 years. In 1842, the mission moved on to Namibia.

Very soon, the missionaries started migrating north through the barren and inhospitable south-western Africa. Here they encountered various local tribes such as the Herero, Nama and Damara, and were frequently in the middle of wars between them. The missionaries tried to broker peace deals between the tribes, and for this reason were later seen as political assets by the tribes.

Around the same time, debate started in Germany regarding its colonial empire, with the activities of the RMS in distant Africa fanning imaginations. The unclaimed area to the north of the Cape Colony was proclaimed German South West Africa in 1880, but they quickly ran into numerous problems, since Germany was inexperienced at colonization. The Herero and Nama genocide during 1904–1908 proved to be the nadir of their rule, and combined with the effects of World War I, Germany was unable to maintain a foothold so far from home. South Africa annexed the area in 1915, renaming it South West Africa. During this time, missionaries' reactions ranged from compassion and help for the local tribes, to patriotism and support of colonial interests.

==== South East Asia ====
Rhenish Missionary Society station house at Sipirok, Tapanuli Residency, Sumatra (ca.1890)

In 1861, a station in Sipirok, Sumatra, Dutch East Indies (present-day: Indonesia), was launched and it lasted until 1940.

The mission in Sipirok was pioneered by missionaries Gerrit van Asselt, Friedrich Wilhelm Betz, Johann Carl Klammer, Wilhelm Heine—including Ludwig Ingwer Nommensen (1834–1918) who arrived to Sipirok in 1862, and later successfully led the Rhenish missionary expansion from Sipirok into the Batak interior-lands at Silindung valley, Humbang, Great Toba area, Samosir Island and multiple regions in Sumatra's East Coast Residency. In building church foundations and community structures, Nommensen intentionally designed and implemented a Volkskirche (people's church) rather than copying Western church frameworks; he adapted the structure to respect the traditional Batak clan governance (marga) and local customary law (adat), contextualizing Christian beliefs within their existing societal framework.

Decades later, a book concerning the missionary work there was written by the female evangelist Hester Needham (1843–1897) who joined the Society, and arrived to Sumatra in 1889. The Rhenish mission in Sumatra was known for its great caution in introducing social changes so as not to radically disrupt the status quo—an approach sometimes misconstrued as excessive conservatism, particularly regarding women's education, while Needham’s presence introduced a commitment to social service and education aimed at uplifting women—an area that had previously lacked structural priority within the RMS. Although this represents significant progress for the rights of Batak women, structural critiques highlight that this mission—rather than empowering them within the framework of adat—actually replaces adat with a system of Western-Christian norms that could potentially alienate the Batak people from their traditional cultural roots. Needham's imposition of patriarchal western gender norms into mission systematically labeled indigenous habits—such as women leading agricultural work, traditional dress, or customary marital structures—as signs of "savagery and barbarism". In doing so, the missionary framework attempted to replace relatively autonomous indigenous female roles with rigid, submissive Western ideals of domesticity and patriarchal family structures.

==== East Asia ====
RMS was also active in South China, where they constructed a Hospital in Tungkun (now called Dongguan) in Guangdong Province. The hospital was supported by several notable medical missionaries, including Dr. Johannes E. Kühne, Dr. Gottlieb Olpp, Dr. Eich and Dr. Zeiß. The RMS legacy survives in Hong Kong under the auspices of the Chinese Rhenish Church Hong Kong Synod, which established and operates several schools including the Rhenish Mission School in Sai Ying Pun (since 1914) along with Rhenish Church Grace School in Diamond Hill (since 1982) and the Rhenish Church Pang Hok Ko Memorial College in Kowloon Tong (since 1973). The Chinese Rhenish Church has operated on Bonham Road, Sai Ying Pun since 1898 and continues in a church adjacent to the Rhenish Mission School, and the Chinese Rhenish Church Kowloon has existed in Kowloon Tong since 1928.

=== 20th century ===
During the 20th century, the Society focused on its work in southern Africa. The Society ultimately amalgamated all of its mission stations in South Africa into the Dutch Reformed Church, except for Wupperthal which chose to join the Moravian Church. The mission stations in Namibia became part of the Evangelical Lutheran Church there.

In 1971, the Rhenish Mission and the Bethel Mission were combined into the United Evangelical Mission.
