= List of members of the 2nd National Assembly of Namibia =

2nd National Assembly of Namibia

Type
- Type: Bicameral

History
- Founded: 1995

Structure
- Seats: 72
- Political groups: SWAPO (53) DTA (15) UDF (2) DCN (1) MAG (1)

Below is a list of the 2nd National Assembly of the Republic of Namibia. Individual members were selected by political parties voted for in the 1994 election. The members were in the National Assembly from 21 March 1995 until 21 March 2000. Members were chosen by their parties. Parties were voted in via proportional representation.

The National Assembly consisted of 78 members: 72 elected from the party lists, and 6 without voting rights, appointed by the president. The seat distribution for the voting members was as follows:

- South West Africa People's Organization (SWAPO): 53
- Democratic Turnhalle Alliance (DTA): 15
- United Democratic Front (UDF): 2
- Democratic Coalition of Namibia (DCN): 1
- Monitor Action Group (MAG): 1

== Members ==
The following people were members of the 2nd National Assembly:

=== South West Africa People's Organization ===
- Mose Tjitendero, speaker of the National Assembly
- Zephania Kameeta deputy speaker
- Hage Geingob, prime minister
- Hendrik Witbooi
- Vekuii Rukoro
- Nangolo Mbumba
- Johannes Mutorwa
- Philemon Malima
- Helmut Angula
- Nickey Iyambo
- Hifikepunye Pohamba
- Theo-Ben Gurirab
- Ben Amathila
- Nahas Angula
- Ngarikutuke Tjiriange
- Moses ǁGaroëb
- Richard Kabajani
- Marco Hausiku
- Andimba Toivo ya Toivo
- Libertine Amathila
- Hidipo Hamutenya
- Gert Hanekom
- Hampie Plichta
- Pendukeni Ithana
- Stan Webster
- Clara Bohitile
- Erkki Nghimtina
- Abraham Iyambo
- Netumbo Ndaitwah
- Iyambo Indongo
- Buddy Wentworth
- Jerry Ekandjo
- Daniel Tjongarero
- John Shaetonhodi
- Hadino Hishongwa
- Michaela Hübschle
- Ben Ulenga
- Jesaja N Nyamu
- Klaus Dierks
- Nico Bessinger
- Anna Bayer
- Willem Biwa (resigned 1996)
- Bernard Esau
- Edward Goeieman
- Gertrud Kandanga-Hilukilwa
- Petrus Iilonga
- Nangolo Ithete
- Willem Konjore
- Nathaniel Maxuilili
- Angelika Muharukua
- Ellen Musialela
- Jeremiah Nambinga
- Alpheus ǃNaruseb
- Hartmut Ruppel
- Ignatius Shixwameni
- Pashukeni Shoombe
- Doreen Sioka
- Sigfried Wohler

=== Democratic Turnhalle Alliance ===
- Mishake Muyongo
- Johan de Waal
- Allois Gende
- Petrus Junius
- Rudolf Kamburona
- Katuutire Kaura
- Daniel Luipert
- Phillemon Moongo
- Andries Mouton
- Kuaima Riruako
- Patricia Siska
- Hans Erik Staby
- Mohammed Stuart

=== United Democratic Front ===
- Justus ǁGaroëb
- Eric Biwa

=== Democratic Coalition of Namibia ===
- Moses Katjioungua

=== Monitor Action Group ===
- Kosie Pretorius

National Assembly of Namibia
| Preceded by 1st National Assembly | 2nd National Assembly; 21 March 1995 – 21 March 2000 | Succeeded by 3rd National Assembly |
