= List of members of the 3rd National Assembly of Namibia =

3rd National Assembly of Namibia

Type
- Type: Bicameral

History
- Founded: 2000

Structure
- Seats: 72
- Political groups: SWAPO (55) CoD (7) DTA (7) UDF (2) MAG (1)

Below is a list of members of the 3rd National Assembly of Namibia. Individual members were selected by political parties voted for in the 1999 election. The members were in the National Assembly from 21 March 2000 until 21 March 2005. Members were chosen by their parties. Parties were voted in via proportional representation.

The National Assembly consisted of 78 members: 72 elected from the party lists, and 6 without voting rights, appointed by the president. This National Assembly, like each of the previous and following National Assemblies, was led by the South West Africa People's Organization. The seat distribution for the voting members was as follows:

- South West Africa People's Organization (SWAPO): 55
- Congress of Democrats (CoD): 7
- Democratic Turnhalle Alliance (DTA): 7
- United Democratic Front (UDF): 2
- Monitor Action Group (MAG): 1

== Members ==
The following people were members of the 3rd National Assembly:

=== SWAPO ===
- Loide Kasingo
- John Mutorwa
- Netumbo Nandi-Ndaitwah
- Doreen Sioka
- Royal ǀUiǀoǀoo
- Jerry Ekandjo
- Albert Kawana (appointed by the president)
- Nickey Iyambo
- Joel Kaapanda (from 2002)
- Nangolo Mbumba
- Alpheus ǃNaruseb
- Erkki Nghimtina
- Theo-Ben Gurirab
- Moses Amweelo (from 2000)
- Nahas Angula
- Hage Geingob
- Marco Hausiku
- Richard Kamwi
- Isak Katali (appointed by the president)
- Lempy Lucas
- Angelika Muharukua
- Teopolina Mushelenga
- Immanuel Ngatjizeko
- Abraham Iyambo
- Gabriel Shihepo
- Jeremiah Nambinga
- Marlene Mungunda
- Paul Smit (appointed by the president)
- Victor Simunja (appointed by the president)
- Petrus Iilonga
- Elia Kaiyamo
- Gerhard Tötemeyer (appointed by the president, retired in 2004)
  - Leon Jooste (replaced Tötemeyer in 2004)
- Hans Booys
- Lydia Katjita
- Magreth Jwagamang
- Ponhele Ya France
- Raphael Dinyando
- Tuliameni Kalomoh (until 2002)
- Mose Tjitendero
- Barmenas Kukuri (Rick)
- Clara Bohitile
- John Shaetonhodi
- Ellen Musialela ()
- Dawid Boois
- Jesaya Nyamu
- Buddy Wentworth
- Hendrik Witbooi
- Helmut Angula
- Philemon Malima
- Hidipo Hamutenya
- Pendukeni Iivula-Ithana
- Hadino Hishongwa
- Hifikepunye Pohamba
- Kaire Mbuende
- Libertina Amathila
- Peter Tsheehama
- Ngarikutuke Tjiriange
- Andimba Toivo Ya Toivo
- Willem Konjore
- Pashukeni Shoombe ()
- Ben Amathila
- Zephania Kameeta
- Saara Kuugongelwa
- Rusa Nghidinwa

=== Congress of Democrats ===
- Ben Ulenga
- Ignatius Shixwameni
- Tsudao Gurirab
- Rosa Namises
- Elizabeth Amukugo
- Linus Chata
- Nora Schimming-Chase

=== Democratic Turnhalle Alliance ===
- Katuutire Kaura
- Philemon Moongo
- Matthew J Phillips
- Charlie A Hathaway (resigned in 2003)
- Sazan Meci (resigned in 2004)
- McHenry Venaani (from 2003)
- Petrus Junius
- Johannes ǀGaseb
- Patricia Siska

=== United Democratic Front ===
- Justus ǁGaroeb
- Eric Biwa (resigned in 2003)
  - Gustaphine Tjombe (from 2003)

=== Monitor Action Group ===
- Kosie Pretorius

National Assembly of Namibia
Preceded by 2nd National Assembly	3rd National Assembly; 21 March 2000 – 21 March 2005	Succeeded by 4th National Assembly
