= List of members of the 1st National Assembly of Namibia =

1st National Assembly: 1990–1995

Type
- Type: Bicameral

History
- Founded: 1990

Structure
- Seats: 72
- Political groups: SWAPO (41) DTA (21) UDF (4) ACN (3) Other (3)

Below is a list of the 1st National Assembly of the Republic of Namibia. Individual members were selected by political parties voted for in the 1989 election, which also determined the members of the Constituent Assembly of Namibia that preceded the 1st National Assembly. The members were in the National Assembly from independence on 21 March 1990 until 21 March 1995. Members are chosen by their parties. Parties are voted in via proportional representation.

The seat distribution per party was as follows:

- South West Africa People's Organization (SWAPO): 41
- Democratic Turnhalle Alliance (DTA): 21
- United Democratic Front (UDF): 4
- Action Christian National (ACN): 3
- Namibia National Front (NNF): 1
- Namibia Patriotic Front (NPF): 1
- Federal Convention of Namibia (FCN): 1

== Members ==
The following people were elected to the 1st National Assembly:

=== South West Africa People's Organization ===
- Asser Kuveri Kapere - Chairperson
- Mose Penaani Tjitendero - Speaker
- Hage Geingob
- Hendrik Witbooi
- Ben Amathila
- Libertine Amathila
- Solomon Amadhila
- Helmut Angula
- Nahas Angula
- Helmut Ausiku
- Nico Bessinger
- Willem Biwa
- Danie Botha
- Klaus Dierks
- Jerry Ekandjo
- Moses ǁGaroëb
- Theo-Ben Gurirab
- Hidipo Hamutenya
- Gert Hanekom
- Marco Hausiku
- Otto Herrigel
- Hadino Hishongwa
- Joshua Hoebeb
- Michaela Hübschle
- Pendukeni Iivula-Ithana
- Nangolo Ithete
- Nickey Iyambo
- Richard Kapelwa Kabajani
- Peter Katjavivi
- Willem Konjore
- Barmenas Rikurura Kukuri
- Philemon Malima
- Nathaniel Maxuilili
- Kaire Mbuende
- David Meroro
- Peter Mweshihange
- Kapuka Nauyala
- John Ya Otto
- Hifikepunye Pohamba
- Hartmut Ruppel
- Pashukeni Shoombe
- Ngarikutuke Tjiriange
- Andimba Toivo ya Toivo
- Peter Tsheehama
- Buddy Wentworth
- Anton Von Wietersheim
- Siegfried Wohler

=== Democratic Turnhalle Alliance ===
- Mishake Muyongo
- Dirk Mudge
- Ben Africa
- Leonard Barnes
- Magareth Barnes
- Allois Gende
- Jeremia Jagger
- Petrus Junius (resigned)
- Geelboy Kashe
- Constance Kgosiemang
- Fanuel Kozonguizi
- Daniel Luipert
- Andrew Matjila
- Hans Erik Staby

=== United Democratic Front ===
- Justus ǁGaroëb
- Eric Biwa
- Reggie Diergaardt

=== Action Christian National ===
- Kosie Pretorius
- Jan de Wet

=== Federal Convention of Namibia ===
- Mburumba Kerina

=== Namibia National Front ===
- Vekuii Rukoro

=== National Patriotic Front ===
- Moses Katjioungua
