= List of renamed places in Namibia =

Since 1990, there have been a small number of places in Namibia which have been renamed, mainly for political, cultural, or linguistic reasons. Some names have been changed to remove colonial or apartheid references, often reverting to their original native language names. Other names (such as street names in Windhoek) have been renamed after foreign leaders or famous Namibians. Overall, Namibia has had fewer renamed places than neighbouring South Africa and Zimbabwe.

== German period ==
Most place names in German South West Africa continued to bear German spellings of the local names, as well as German translations of some local phrases. The few exceptions to the rule included places founded by the Rhenish Missionary Society, generally biblical names, as well as

- Hornkranz (Hoornkrans)
- Sandfontein
- Stolzenfels
- Waterberg (Omuverumue)

== Regions and constituencies ==
- Caprivi Region → Zambezi Region (2013)
- Okavango Region → Kavango Region (1998)
- Brandberg Constituency → Dâures Constituency (1998)
- Buitepos Constituency → Kalahari Constituency (1998)
- Khomasdal North Constituency → Khomasdal Constituency (2013)
- Lüderitz Constituency → ǃNamiǂNûs Constituency (2013)
- Okalonga Constituency → Okalongo Constituency (1998)
- Okatope Constituency → Onyaanya Constituency (1999)
- Oshikoto Constituency → Tsumeb Constituency (1999)
- Otjozondjou Constituency → Otjombinde Constituency (1998)
- Rundu Rural West Constituency → Ncuncuni Constituency (2013)
- Steinhausen Constituency → Okorukambe Constituency (2013)
- Uutapi Constituency → Outapi Constituency (1998)
- Wanaheda Constituency → Samora Machel Constituency (2003)

== Settlements ==
- ǀAixa-aibes → Warmbad (1760)
- ǃAutsawises → Berseba (1850)
- Arahoab → Aranos (1960s)
- ǀAi-ǁgams (Khoekhoegowab) / Otjomuise (Otjiherero) → Windhoek (1838) → Elberfeld / Barmen (1842) → Concordiaville (1844) → Esek (1844) → Windhoek
- Kalkfontein → Karasburg (1939)
- Klipfontein (ǀUiǂgandes) → Bethanie (1815)
- Naosanabis → Wesley Vale (1843) → Leonardville (20th century)
- Schuckmannsburg → Luhonono (2013)
- Welwitschia → Khorixas (1989)

== Streets ==
=== Swakopmund ===
Status: 2002

New Name	Old Name
Libertina Amathila Avenue	Brückenstraße
Anton Lubowski Avenue	Lazarettstraße
Daniel Tjongarero Street	Poststraße
Franziska Van Neel Street	Mosely Avenue; Uranstraße
Hendrik Witbooi Street	Schulstraße; Roonstraße
Hidipo Hamutenya Avenue	Feldstraße
Mandume ya Ndemufayo Street	Schlosserstraße
Moses ǁGaroëb Street	Nordring; Südring
Nathaniel Maxuilili Street	Breite Straße
Nelson Mandela Avenue	Winterstraße
Rakotoka Street	Kolonelstraße; Knoblochstraße; Garnisonstraße
Sam Nujoma Avenue	Kaiser-Wilhelm-Straße
Theo-Ben Gurirab Avenue	Bahnhofstraße
Tobias Hainyeko Street	Mittelstraße; Garnisonstraße; Moltkestraße
Vrede Rede Avenue	Louis-Botha-Straße; Dante Avenue

=== Windhoek ===
New Name	Old Name
Aaron Tjatindi Street	Betlehem St
A. B. May Street	Kalk St
Amsas Street	Otjivero St
Andimba Toivo ya Toivo Street	Kruppstraße
Axali Doëseb Street	Louis Botha St
Bernt Carlsson Road	Pionier Road
Bishop Patropas Tjitjo Street	Genesis St
Bishop A. C. Kamburona Street	Klaagliedere St; Kronieke St
Bonifatius Haushiku Street	Jordan St
Christa Davids Street	Paul Kruger St
Clemens Kapuuo Street	Sabbat Street
Daniel Munamava Street	Göringstraße
David Hosea Meroro Road	Hochland Road
Dr. António Agostinho Neto Square	Ausspannplatz
Dr. Mose Tjitendero Street	Malcom Spence St
Dr. Kenneth David Kaunda Street	Uhlandstraße
Dr. Kwame Nkrumah Avenue	Gevers St; Mission Road
Dr. Theo-Ben Gurirab Street	Burg St
Eneas Peter Nanyemba Road	Monte Christo Road
Ephraim Hei Street	Handelinge St
Evergreen Street	Dorado Park St
Festus Lazarus Street	Lazarus St
Fidel Castro Street	Peter Müller St
Fonnie Karuaihe Street	Lüderitz St
Frankie Fredericks Drive	Knudsen St
Frans Indongo Street	Bülowstraße
Fumbe Street	Ongeama St
Gaob Dr. Justus ǁGaroëb Street	Johann Albrecht St
General Murtala Muhammed Avenue	Omuramba Road
General Karel Ndjoba Street	Hennie Laubscher St
Hamutenya Wanahepo Ndadi Street	Reginald Walker St
Hans-Dietrich Genscher Street	Hostel St; Rand St; Pool St
Hendrik Witbooi Drive	Charl Marais Street
Hosea Kutako Drive	Okahandja Road; T. V. More St
Independence Avenue	Kaiserstraße
Jackson Kaujeua Street	Storchstraße
Joseph Mukwayu Ithana Street	Gloudina St
Julius K. Nyerere Street	Lazarett St
Juuso Katangolo Street	Tuin St
Katjikuru Katjiuongua Street	Düsseldorf St
Kuaima Riruako Street	Bachstraße
Laurent-Désiré Kabila Road	Populier Street
Mahatma Gandhi Street	Perset St; Sterling St
Mandume Ndemufayo Avenue	Gamsberg Road; Talstraße
Marcus Garvey Street	Babs St
Marien Ngouabi Street	Körner St (eastern part)
Mburumba Kerina Street	Bahnhofstraße
Mika Kaiyamo Street	Dorp St
Michelle McLean Street	Gold St
Nelson Mandela Avenue	Klein-Windhoek-Weg
Olof Palme Street	De Jager St
Omuzeme Street	Omuzu St
Paul Mogagabe Street	Trinitatis Straße
Phillip Shiimi Street	Zenobia Street
Rev. Erwin Tjirimue Street	Legioen St
Rev. Michael Scott Street	Neser St
Reverend Karuaera Street	Caesar St
Robert Mugabe Avenue	Joan Harrison Street; Leutweinstraße
Sam Nujoma Drive	Curt von François Straße; Gobabis Road
Sean McBride Street	Fanie Du Plessis St
Seretse Khama Street	Feld St
Shanghai Road	Central Avenue; Jaguar St
Shikongo Nuunyango Street	Penning St
Tsukhoe //Gowases Street	Ranonkel St; Begonia St; Rooivalk St
Simeon Shixungileni Street	Bismarckstraße
Werner List Street	Stübel St
Wika Drive	Liechtenstein St
Wilibald Kapuenene Street	Attie Potgieter St
Winnie Madikizela Mandela Road	Otjomuise Road

The sources of the previous renaming documents are outdated or no longer available and are being reprocessed.

== Airports ==
- J. G. Strydom International Airport → Hosea Kutako International Airport (1990)

== Other ==
- Windhoek: Zoo Park → Verwoerd Park → Zoo Park (2004)

== See also ==
- List of placename renaming in South Africa
- List of placename renaming in Zimbabwe
