= List of former Swakopmund street names =

In the first years after independence of Namibia in 1990, the Swakopmund council changed many of the original German and Afrikaans street names to honor former and current Namibian leaders.

The move met the resistance of inhabitants who collected the old street name plaques to display them on their private properties, and painted the old street names on their houses. Particularly controversial was that some politicians instructed streets to be named after themselves, as Sam Nujoma did in 2001 and Libertine Amathila in 2002.

new name	original name
Albertina Amathila Ave.	Brücken (Bruecken) Str.
Anton Lubowski Ave.	Lazarett Str.
Daniel Tjongarero Str.	Post Str.
Franziska Van Neel Str.	Mosely Ave./ Uraan Str.
Hendrik Witbooi Str.	Schul / Roon Str.
Hidipo Hamutenya Ave.	Feld Str.
Mandume Ya Ndemufayo Str.	Schlosser Str.
Moses ǁGaroëb Str.	Nordring / Südring
Nathaniel Maxuilili Str.	Breite Str
Nelson Mandela Ave.	Winter Str.
Rakota Str.	Kolonel / Knobloch / Garnison Str.
Sam Nujoma Ave.	Kaiser-Wilhelm-Str.
Theo-Ben Gurirab Ave.	Bahnhof Str.
Tobias Hainyeko Str.	Mittel / Garnison / Moltke Str.
Vrede Rede Ave.	Louis Botha Str./ Dante Ave.

== See also ==
List of renamed places in Namibia
