= List of National Assemblies of Namibia =

Below is the list of National Assemblies of Namibia, including the Constituent Assembly, which was formed prior to independence in order to write the Constitution of Namibia.

- Constituent Assembly (1989–1990)
- 1st National Assembly (1990–1995)
- 2nd National Assembly (1995–2000)
- 3rd National Assembly (2000–2005)
- 4th National Assembly (2005–2010)
- 5th National Assembly (2010–2015)
- 6th National Assembly (2015–2020)
- 7th National Assembly (2020–2025)
- 8th National Assembly (2025–present)
