= Eben van Zijl =

Namibian politician (1931–2009)

Ebenezer van Zijl (1931 – 13 January 2009) was a White Namibian politician and lawyer in South West Africa, the forerunner to modern Namibia.

Van Zijl was a prominent member of the National Party of South West Africa (NP), which was a branch of the main party in South Africa. He was a member of the all-White legislative assembly of South West Africa from 1964 until 1981. He left politics in 1981 when he was defeated by Kosie Pretorius for the position of party leader. Van Zijl returned to politics two years later when he became a NP delegate to the Multi-party conference. In 1985 and 1986, he served in the controversial Transitional Government of National Unity (TGNU) as Minister in the Cabinet. The TGNU sought to form an independent government which did not include SWAPO. He and other NP members formed the Action National Settlement in 1985/1986 and joined with Moses Katjiuongua and SWANU and another party to form the National Patriotic Front, which took part in the 1989 election. The NPF, however, only earned one seat in the Constituent Assembly, which went to Katjiongua. Following the defeat, van Zijl retired from politics permanently.

Following retirement, van Zijl mostly stayed on his farm, called "Den Haag", in the Summerdown area in the Omaheke Region in eastern Namibia. He died in Swakopmund in January 2009 at the age of 77.
