= Fillipus Nandenga =

Namibian military officer (1943–2021)

Fillipus Amutenya "Zulu" Nandenga
- Born: 3 March 1943; Ombalamumbwenge, Oshigambo, Namibia (then South-West Africa, South Africa)
- Died: 11 April 2021 (aged 78)
- Military career
- Allegiance: Namibia
- Branch: PLAN (1967-1990); Namibian Army (1990-2007)
- Rank: Colonel
- Commands: Northern Front (1977-1980s)
- Conflicts: Namibian War of Independence

Colonel Fillipus Amutenya "Commander Zulu" Nandenga (3 March 1943 – 11 April 2021) was a Namibian military officer whose military career began in South West African Liberational Army (SWALA) the forerunner to People's Liberation Army of Namibia PLAN. He was originally born Johannes Amutenya Tuadeleni Nandenga (liberation struggle forced him to take up a new identity as he was a wanted man which was his younger brother’s name Fillipus Nandenga) on the 3 March 1930 in Onandutu at Ombala ya M’mbwenge in the Oshigambo Constituency. He was the 3rd born Son of Nandenga ya Nelenge and first born of Ndilimeke Naimbodi ya Abraham Nghondela.

Zulu attended school at Oshigambo Primary School up to standard six and had to abandon school in favour looking after his parents’ cattle, in search for greener pastures.

In 1958, Commander Zulu felt that he was grown up enough to join the contract labour system to find a paying job in the south of the country. In the same year, he was recruited to work in a fish canning factory in Walvis Bay where he was employed for period of five years until 1963.

During his stay in Walvis Bay, Political consciousness was gaining momentum among the contract labour workers from the former Owamboland, which saw the birth of the Owambo People’s Organisation in 1959 and Zulu immediately joined OPO without hesitation.

In mid-1966, Zulu left Botswana for Zambia where he stayed for one year before being dispatched to Tanzania for a Seven-month long intense military training in tactical guerrilla war fare in the Democratic People’s Republic of Korea, from 1967-1968 respectively.

After completing his military training in North Korea, Zulu was deployed at the Eastern Front, along the Zambia, Namibia and Angolan borders from 1969 -1972. It is at the Eastern Front in the Caprivi Strip, were Zulu tested his first combat, putting his tactical guerrilla combat training skills against the enemy into practice.

In mid-1973, Zulu narrates that their respected Political and Military Commander, Jason Hamutenya Wanehepo Ndadi came to the front where he assembled Unit A and B to inform them that a new front was going to be opened up in Southern Angola, to be known as the Northern Front. Ndadi called for volunteers to step forward immediately, for the preparations of a No Return Epic Mission into Angola to start – mindful that Portuguese soldiers were still very much in control of Southern Angola.

True to his fearless and selfless character, Zulu was second to step forward after Matias Ndakolo, Mbulunganga (May his soul RIP), who was appointed Commander of the Seventeen strong Commandos. Zulu was appointed Political Commissar of the group.

Zulu leaves behind his wife, 14 children, and 4 siblings.

== Early life ==
In 1958 he joined the contract labour system and found a paying job at a fish tinning factory in Walvis Bay and was employed there for five years until 1963. Nandenga joined Ovamboland Peoples Organisation in 1958. In 1964 due to his political conviction he fled South West Africa through Bechuanaland and lived in Francistown for a period of one year and a half joining other cadres in exile such as Nahas Angula, Helmut Angula, Nangolo Mbumba. In 1966 he was then sent to Zambia.

== PLAN career ==
In 1967 he was sent to Tanganyika. He was then sent to North Korea between 1967 and 1968. After completing his military training he was then deployed to the Eastern front in Zambia from 1969 to 1972 as Commander of Group "A" whilst Group "B" was under the command of Matias Ndakolo. On the eastern front he fought the South African forces and the Portuguese forces. In late 1973 Jason Amutenya "Wanehepo" Ndandi during which unit "A" and "B" assembled and informed that a new front would be opened up in Southern Angola that would be known as the northern front and that volunteers were needed for the risky mission knowing that Portuguese forces were still present in Angola. After Matias "Mbulunganga" Ndakolo stepped forward, Nandenga also stepped forward to volunteer. This group of seventeen fighters would leave Zambia into Angola with Mbulunganga as their commander and "Zulu" was appointed the political commissar. The seventeen fighters were Matias "Mbulunganga" Ndakolo; commander, Fillipus "Zulu" Nandenga; political commissar, Elia Haulyondjaba "Hailonga"; Advisor to Commander, Wilbard "Nakada" Tashiya, Isack "Pondo" Shikongo; Commander Reconnaissance, John "Kalola" Hamukoto; 2nd Reconnaissance commander, Linus "Mawila" Hamwele, Ismael "Ngiringiri" Kamati, Erickson "Kapanya" Hauwanga, Uno "Kanana" Shaanika, Sackeus "Kapuleko" Kapulwa, John Karahani, Joao Shoopala, Manuel "Kalunga Kondjaba", Jonas "Katengela" Kataleonga, Jason Kaudeko and Amwaama Akapandi. This group crossed into Angola from Zambia. The group was given instruction to avoid Portuguese forces if possible and to not involve itself in the domestic squabbles of UNITA, MPLA & FNLA with their final destination being Oshimholo, Southern Angola. He was then appointed the Commander of the Northern Front in 1977 after the first military council meeting at Efitu. In the 1980s he was recalled from the front and sent for studies, eventually ending up at the United Nations Institute for Namibia in Zambia.

== NDF career ==
His career in a Namibian Defence Force began in 1990 and he was given the rank of Warrant Officer and later being commissioned as an officer and retired with the rank of colonel.

== Honours and decorations ==
- Most distinguished order of Namibia-First Class
- Namibian Army Pioneer Medal.
- NDF Commendation Medal

== Death ==
Colonel Zulu Nandenga died on 11 April 2021 and was accorded a state funeral. He was laid to rest at Eenhana memorial shrine on 24 April 2021.
