= Richard Kabajani =

Namibian politician & diplomat (1943–2007)

The Honourable Richard Kabajani

Namibian ambassador to Cuba
- In office 2000–2004
- President: Sam Nujoma
- Prime Minister: Hage Geingob; Theo-Ben Gurirab

Minister of Youth and Sport
- In office 1995–2000
- President: Sam Nujoma
- Prime Minister: Hage Geingob
- Preceded by: Pendukeni Iivula-Ithana
- Succeeded by: John Mutorwa as minister of Basic Education, Culture and Sport

Minister of Lands, Resettlement and Rehabilitation
- In office 1992–1995
- President: Sam Nujoma
- Prime Minister: Hage Geingob
- Preceded by: Marco Hausiku
- Succeeded by: Pendukeni Iivula-Ithana

Minister of Public Works, Transport and Communication
- In office 1990–1992
- President: Sam Nujoma
- Prime Minister: Hage Geingob
- Preceded by: position established
- Succeeded by: Marco Hausiku

Personal details
- Born: 15 February 1943 Katima Mulilo, South West Africa
- Died: 17 May 2007 (aged 64) Katima Mulilo, Namibia
- Party: SWAPO

Richard Kapelwa Kabajani (15 February 1943 – 17 May 2007) was a Namibian activist, militant, diplomat and politician. Kabajani was a military commander for SWAPO during the Namibian War of Independence and after independence served a minister in the Namibian government.

== Early life ==
Kabajani was born on 15 February 1943 in the Caprivi Region in the village of Ivilivinzi, 117 km from Katima Mulilo. He attended school in Botswana from 1955 to 1964. While in Botswana, he attended Ngoma Primary School and Mulumba Mission School and in the later years developed an interest in politics. He was classmate of fellow future People's Liberation Army of Namibia combatant Greenwell Matongo and future traditional ruler of the Mafwe people Mamili Boniface Bebi.

== Career ==
In 1964, Kabajani joined SWAPO and was sent to Northern Rhodesia (Zambia) and Mbeya, Tanzania for military training. During the War of Independence, the Caprivi native was one of the first fighters to engage the South African Defence Forces in the northeastern Caprivi Region. In 1986, he became special assistant to SWAPO leader and future president Sam Nujoma. During the run-up to Namibia's independence, Kabajani was elected to the Constituent Assembly of Namibia, which wrote the Namibian Constitution.

He also was chosen by SWAPO to be in the first (1990–1995) and second National Assemblies of Namibia, where he served as Minister of Public Works, Transport and Communication from 1990 to 1992, as Minister of Lands, Resettlement and Rehabilitation from 1992 to 1995, and as Minister of Youth and Sport from 1995 to 2000. From 2000 to 2004, he was Namibia's ambassador to Cuba. Kabajani retired in 2004 and died from heart failure on 17 May 2007 at Katima Mulilo State Hospital. He was buried at Heroes Acre national memorial outside of Windhoek.
