= Clara Bohitile =

Namibian businesswoman and former politician

The Honorable Clara Bohitile

Deputy Minister of Basic Education and Culture
- In office 21 March 1995 – 21 March 2005
- President: Sam Nujoma

Personal details
- Born: 19 November 1955 (age 70) Windhoek
- Party: SWAPO
- Education: Tshiye College; Vista University
- Occupation: Politician
- Profession: Teacher

Clara Gasebewe Bohitile (born 19 November 1955) is a Namibian businesswoman and former politician.

== Early life and education ==
Bohitile was born on 19 November 1955 in Windhoek. She attended the Catholic School in the Old Location, Windhoek's black resident's suburb until the late 1950s. She also schooled at Gunichas Roman Catholic School near Gobabis and at the Catholic High School in Döbra. Bohitile took up Home Economics on tertiary education at Tshiye College and Vista University, both in South Africa. After graduation she taught at Windhoek's Immanuel Shifidi Secondary School. She also started a farming career and became active in politics.

== Political career ==
A member of SWAPO, Bohitile was a member of the 2nd and 3rd National Assemblies from 1995 to 2005. She also served as the Deputy Minister of Basic Education and Culture from 1995 to 2005 as well. She re-entered the National Assembly from 2007 to 2010 when she replaced Ben Amathila, who retired. She is also a member of the SWAPO Central Committee.

== Business career ==
Bohitile is also a prominent commercial farmer as well as politician. In 2006, she was named the Emerging Farmer of the Year by the Namibia Agricultural Union. In September 2010, she made history when she was elected to the board of the MeatCo Namibia. She was the first woman ever chosen to the chair the MeatCo board. Bohitile also served at the board of Windhoek Country Club and Casino.

== Recognition ==
Bohitile was conferred the Excellent Order of the Eagle, third Class on Heroes' Day 2014.
