= Africanization =

Making something African

Africanization or Africanisation (lit., making something African) has been applied in various contexts, notably in geographic and personal naming and in the composition of the civil service via processes such as indigenization.

== Africanization of names ==
Africanization has referred to the modification of place, names and personal names to reflect an "African" identity. In some cases, changes are not only of transliteration but of the European name.

In many cases during the colonial period, African placenames were Anglicized or Francized.

=== Place names ===
==== Country names ====
A number of African countries have undergone name changes during the previous century as the result of consolidations and secessions, territories gaining sovereignty, and regime changes.

Previous name	Year	Current name
Dahomey, Republic of	1975	Benin, Republic of
Bechuanaland Protectorate	1966	Botswana, Republic of
Upper Volta	1984	Burkina Faso
Ubangi-Shari	1958	Central African Republic
Zaire, Republic of	1997	Congo, Democratic Republic of the
Middle Congo	1960	Congo, Republic of the
French Somaliland / Afars and Issas	1977	Djibouti, Republic of
Spanish Guinea	1968	Equatorial Guinea, Republic of
Swaziland, Kingdom of	2018	Eswatini, Kingdom of
Gold Coast	1957	Ghana, Republic of
French Guinea	1958	Guinea, Republic of
Portuguese Guinea	1974	Guinea-Bissau, Republic of
Basutoland, Territory of	1966	Lesotho, Kingdom of
Nyasaland Protectorate	1964	Malawi, Republic of
French Sudan	1960	Mali, Republic of
South-West Africa	1990	Namibia, Republic of
Ruanda-Urundi	1962	Rwanda, Republic of / Burundi, Republic of
Zanzibar / Tanganyika	1964	Tanzania, United Republic of
Northern Rhodesia	1964	Zambia, Republic of
Southern Rhodesia	1980	Zimbabwe, Republic of

==== Other place names ====
- Fernando Po island changed to Bioko Island
- Léopoldville changed to Kinshasa
- Salisbury changed to Harare
- Lourenço Marques changed to Maputo
- Nova Lisboa changed to Huambo
- Fort Lamy changed to N'Djaména
- Tananarive changed to Antananarivo
- Bathurst changed to Banjul
- Santa Isabel/Port Clarence changed to Malabo
- Élisabethville changed to Lubumbashi
- Stanleyville changed to Kisangani
- Luluabourg changed to Kananga
- Ponthierville changed to Ubundu
- Novo Redondo changed to Sumbe
- Moçâmedes changed to Namibe, but changed back to Moçâmedes in 2016
- Abercorn changed to Mbala
- Broken Hill changed to Kabwe
- Fort Jameson changed to Chipata
- Hartley changed to Chegutu
- Fort Victoria changed to Masvingo
- Many places whose names were of European origin in South Africa have undergone Africanization since 1994; see South African Geographical Names Council.
- Since July 2025, all 17 administrative regions of Burkina Faso have had their French names replaced with names that reflect the country's new official and national languages.
- Port Elizabeth changed to Gqeberha in 2021.

=== Personal names ===
- Joseph-Désiré Mobutu changed to Mobutu Sese Seko
- François Tombalbaye changed to N'Garta Tombalbaye
- Étienne Eyadéma changed to Gnassingbé Eyadéma
- Francisco Macías Nguema changed to Masie Nguema Biyogo Ñegue Ndong

Sometimes, the name change can be used to reflect a change of faith, most prominently seen in the case of Islam. (See Islamic name.)
Examples:

- Albert-Bernard Bongo changed to Omar Bongo
- Dawda Jawara changed to David Jawara in 1953
- Jean-Bédel Bokassa changed to Salah Eddine Ahmed Bokassa

== Africanization of civil services ==
In some countries after following their independence, "Africanization" was the name given to racial policies and affirmative action, which were intended to increase the number of indigenous Africans in the civil service.

== Localization in African languages ==
The term Africanization, abbreviated as the numeronym "A12n," has been applied to discussion of internationalization and localization of software and content in African languages.

== See also ==
- List of renamed places in South Africa
- List of city name changes
- List of renamed places in Namibia
- List of renamed places in Zimbabwe
- List of renamed places in the Democratic Republic of the Congo
