= Ndeutala Angolo =

Namibian writer and political activist

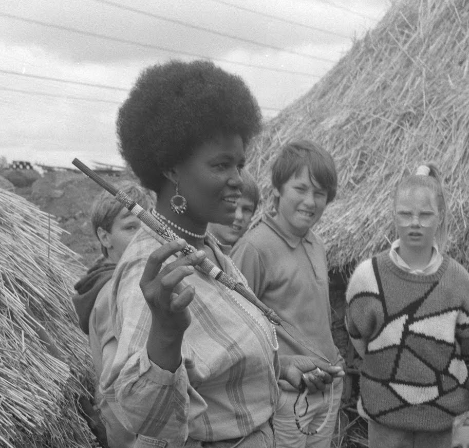
- Ndeutala Angolo in Australia in 1988.
- Born: 1952 (age 73–74); Okalili, Namibia
- Education: Stockholm University, Växjö University, La Trobe University
- Occupations: Writer, political activist
- Notable work: Marrying Apartheid (1986), Women of Namibia (1983)
- Movement: SWAPO
- Spouse: Hadino Hishongwa

Ndeutala Angolo (born 1952), also known as Ndeutala Selma Hishongwa and Ndeutala Angolo Amutenya, is a Namibian writer and political activist.

Her 1986 book Marrying Apartheid is considered the first English-language novel by a black Namibian woman.

Angolo organized in exile with the independence movement SWAPO in the 1970s and 1980s. After returning to Namibia during its transition to independence, she served as permanent secretary in the Office of the Presidency and in the Ministry of Safety and Security for nearly three decades.

== Early life and education ==
Ndeutala Angolo was born in 1952 in Okalili, in Namibia's northwestern Omusati Region. She was the second of seven children. Her native language is the Oshindonga dialect of Oshivambo.

Her parents were traditional farmers, and she did not start school until the age of nine. After attending high school in Oshigambo, she studied to become a nurse and began working in a local hospital.

Angolo joined the anti-apartheid movement at a young age.

== Exile ==
In 1974, Angolo left the country and joined the exiled South West Africa People's Organisation (SWAPO), a Namibian independence movement, in Zambia. Her aim was to "join the liberation struggle," and she was given military training.

She then traveled to study at Stockholm University and Växjö University in Sweden through a scholarship from the Lutheran World Federation, arranged by SWAPO. After moving from Sweden to Australia in 1985, she completed her postgraduate studies at the Centre for Comparative and International Studies in Education at La Trobe University in Melbourne, Australia, completing her Ph.D. in 1988.

In 1989, Angolo became one of the first exiles to return to Namibia as it gained independence from South Africa.

== Career ==
=== Writing ===
Angolo has published several books under her married name, Ndeutala Hishongwa. Throughout her work, she links women's oppression to colonialism and women's equality to national liberation.

Her first book, Women of Namibia: The Changing Role of Namibian Women from Traditional Precolonial Times to the Present, was published in 1983. Angolo had found that there was very little research available on the situation of Namibian women and set out to complete her own study.

In 1986, she wrote Marrying Apartheid, a novel published while she was in Australia. The book deals with a newlywed couple in the northwestern region of Namibia and criticizes both patriarchal control and colonial rule. It depicts the intertwined nature of political and household violence in the apartheid state. Marrying Apartheid fictionalized real situations Angolo observed or experienced in her youth in Namibia's northwest.

Marrying Apartheid is considered the first English-language novel by a black Namibian woman. It marked a turning point in the country's nascent national literature and helped inspire other women such as Ellen Namhila and Neshani Andreas to produce literary works.

Angolo's third book, The Contract Labour System and its Effects on Family and Social Life in Namibia: A Historical Perspective, was published in 1992. It argues that the gender-based system of labor migration in Namibia, which was a factor in Angolo's own childhood, significantly contributes to social disruption.

Additionally, Angolo published the scholarly essay Bantu Education: A Tool For Development? in 1984.

=== Civil service ===
After returning to Namibia from exile, Angolo served as permanent secretary in the Office of the President under the independent country's first president, Sam Nujoma, until he left office in 2005.

She then served as permanent secretary in the Ministry of Safety and Security before returning to the Office of the President in 2012.

== Personal life ==
Ndeutala Angolo was married to Hadino Hishongwa, a founding member of SWAPO, diplomat, and government minister, with whom she had two children. The couple later divorced.

== Recognition ==
A primary school in the Otamanzi Constituency of her native Omusati Region is named Dr. Ndeutala Angolo in her honor.

In 2014, she was honored with the Excellent Order of the Eagle, Second Class.

== Selected works ==
- Women of Namibia: The Changing Role of Namibian Women from Traditional Precolonial Times to the Present (1983)
- Marrying Apartheid (1986)
- The Contract Labour System and its Effects on Family and Social Life in Namibia: A Historical Perspective (1992)
