= Hans Booys =

Namibian politician (1951–2021)

Hans Gabriel Booys
- Born: 4 December 1951; Rehoboth, Hardap Region, Namibia
- Died: 19 July 2021 (aged 69)
- Occupation: Politician

Hans Gabriel Booys (4 December 1951 in Rehoboth, Hardap Region – 19 July 2021) was a Namibian politician. A member of SWAPO, Booys was selected to the National Assembly to replace Nathaniel Maxuilili after he died in a vehicle accident. Shortly after, he was elected in the 1999 election. He was once again re-elected in the 2004 election.

In 2005 President Hifikepunye Pohamba appointed him to serve on the Security Commission – the constitutional body, which makes recommendations to the President on top army and police appointments and other security matters. He was SWAPO's Deputy Chief Whip in the National Assembly.

== Career ==
Booys joined SWAPO in 1974. From 1982 to 1990, he was a literacy instructor for the Namibia Literacy Project. In 1990, he became a regional commissioner at Khorixas, Kunene Region. From 1993 to 2002, Booys was a member of the SWAPO Central Committee. From 2009 to 2011, Booys served as a member of the Pan-African Parliament.

== Personal life ==
Booys grew up in South Africa and attended school at Cornelius Goreseb.

He was targetted under the Apartheid regime in South African, being placed under house arrest and tortured by the State.

He lived in Okahandja.

Booys died from COVID-19 in 2021 aged 69.
