= National Patriotic Front (Namibia) =

Namibian political party

- Abbreviation: NPF
- Founded: March 1989
- Ideology: SWATF veterans' interests
- Colors: Red, yellow, green, black
- Seats in the National Assembly: 0 / 104
- Seats in the National Council: 0 / 42
- Regional Councillors: 0 / 121
- Local Councillors: 0 / 378
- Pan-African Parliament: 0 / 5

The National Patriotic Front is a political party in Namibia.

Founded in 1989, the party was dormant in the 2000s, until it was revived for the 2019 Namibian general election. One of the party's primary platforms is representation of veterans who fought for the South West African Territorial Force (SWATF) and other divisions of the South West African security forces during the Namibian War of Independence. The party seeks to get these former service members classified officially as war veterans by the Namibian government, a recognition afforded only to former insurgents of the People's Liberation Army of Namibia (PLAN). As of August 2019, the party has no official leadership beyond Uapiruka Papama, its acting secretary-general. The NPF failed to achieve parliamentary representation after it finished last in the national assembly election, receiving 1,785 votes (0.22%). It did not field a presidential candidate.

The NPF contested the 2024 general election but failed to obtain a seat in the Parliament of Namibia as it only received 1,315 votes (0.12%) of the national vote. The NPF finished last (in 21st place) among all parties.

== History ==
It was formed in March 1989 at the initiative of Moses Katjioungua as an alliance of the Action National Settlement, South West African National Union and Caprivi African National Union political parties. Katjioungua was elected to the Constituent Assembly of Namibia, the 1st National Assembly of Namibia and the 2nd National Assembly of Namibia. The early party leaders included ANS leader Eben van Zijl and CANU leader Siseho Simasiku.

== See also ==
- Category:National Patriotic Front (Namibia) politicians
- List of political parties in Namibia
