= Rudolph Kamburona =

Namibian politician

Rudolph Kamburona is a Namibian politician. A member of the Rally for Democracy and Progress, Kamburona was 9th on the party's electoral list but was not elected to the National Assembly of Namibia in the 2009 general election. Kamburona served in the 1st and 2nd National Assemblies (1991-2000) as a member of the Democratic Turnhalle Alliance. He was one of the longest-serving members of DTA prior to his resignation in January 2008. He sought to focus on his farming activities, saying, "I cannot be a weekend farmer only and also handle political activities so I had to come to a decision,". He officially announced his affiliation with RDP at a rally in Tsumeb in August 2008. Kamburona is Herero.

== Alleged assassination plot ==
In February 2010 at a campaign rally in Okahandja, Kamburona announced that a plot to assassinate opposition leaders existed. Opposition leaders were allegedly targeted because of the contested 2009 general election, though they had not filed a formal police complaint prior to the announcement. The assassination plot was allegedly to place poisonous powder on the clothes and car door handles of opposition leaders.
