= John Ya-Otto =

Namibian trade unionist (1938–1994)

Personal details
- Born: February 10, 1938
- Died: May 25, 1994 (aged 56)

John Ya-Otto (10 February 1938 - 25 May 1994) was a Namibian teacher, trade unionist, politician, author and diplomat.

Born in Ovamboland, a native reserve in South West Africa ruled by South Africa under a League of Nations Mandate, he was smuggled as a baby by his aunt to Keetmanshoop in Southern Namibia and claimed to have been born there. This enabled him to be educated and to work permanently in the Police Zone where blacks from the "reserves" were otherwise only allowed as migrant labourers with temporary residence permits.

He was educated at a Rhenish Mission School in Tsumeb and the Augustineum Training College in Okahandja, where he obtained a teaching certificate. He then taught at the Herero School in Windhoek’s Old Location. Ya-Otto began a career in politics following the 1959 Old Location Massacre in the black township. Ya-Otto joined the newly established liberation movement SWAPO and soon became part of the movement's leadership in his role as acting secretary-general, and as editor of SWAPO's newsletter Unity Wings, while many of SWAPO's leaders, including its president Sam Nujoma, were already in exile.

He was arrested in 1966 following the Battle of Ongulumbashe, which was the first military engagement between SWAPO and South African military and police in northern Namibia. Together with 36 others, he was accused under the sweeping definitions of "terrorism" of the newly promulgated South African "Terrorism Act". As one of the few accused who were fluent in English and Afrikaans, he was instrumental in preparing the defence together with their lawyer, Joel Carlson. Most of the accused received lifelong or 20-year prison sentences, to be served in Robben Island. However, no direct involvement of Ya-Otto in the military liberation struggle could be proven, and he received a suspended 5-year sentence under the Suppression of Communism Act and was released.

In the 1970s he was present for part of the 1971-72 Namibian contract workers strike. He continued to organise for SWAPO, but was repeatedly arrested. Eventually, Ya-Otto fled into exile and worked as SWAPO's secretary for labour, and leader of the exiled National Union of Namibian Workers (NUNW), based in Lusaka until 1979 and then in Luanda. He established relationships with trade unionists around the world.

In 1976, he chaired the Ya Otto Commission to investigate internal dissent in SWAPO. In 1981, he published his only book Battlefront Namibia, based on extensive interviews by Ole Gjerstad and detailing SWAPO's and his own struggle for independence. In preparation for the UN-supervised elections for independence, he returned to Namibia in June 1989 and was elected on the SWAPO list to the Constituent Assembly of Namibia which wrote the Constitution for independent Namibia and, after the attainment of independence on 21 March 1990, continued to sit as National Assembly of Namibia. Later, he was assigned ambassador to Angola.

He died in Luanda on 25 May 1994. In 2010, Ya-Otto was posthumously awarded Namibia's Most Excellent Order of the Eagle 2nd Class.
