= Rosa Namises =

Namibian politician and human rights activist

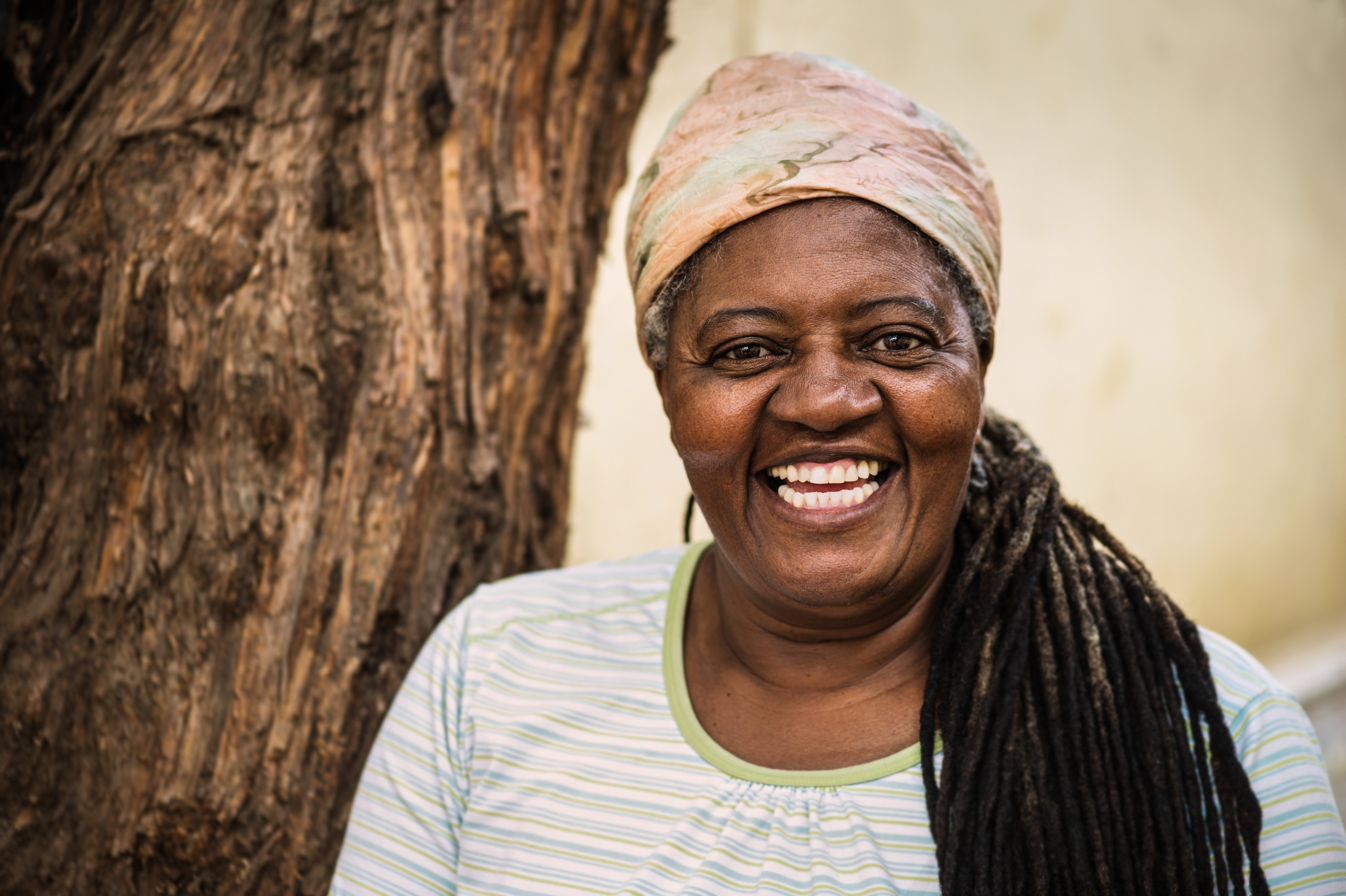
- Born: 20 April 1958 (age 68); Old Location, Windhoek, Khomas Region
- Citizenship: Namibian
- Education: University of South Africa
- Occupation: Activist

Visolela Rosalinda "Rosa" Namises (born 1958), nicknamed the "Rosa Luxemburg of Namibia", is a Namibian politician, human-rights activist and chief of a faction of the ǀKhomanin, a clan of the Damara people. She is a former member of Parliament and founding member and former secretary-general of the Namibian Congress of Democrats (CoD). A prominent voice on gender issues, human-rights violations, and violence against women and children in Namibia, she is the director of Woman Solidarity Namibia and works at the Dolam Residential Child Care centre, a day-care centre for vulnerable children.

== Early life and education ==
Namises was born on 20 April 1958 as one of nine children to an Angolan father and Damara mother in the Old Location of Windhoek, the capital of Namibia. She grew up with her father until she was 15 years old and attended the Augustineum Secondary School in Windhoek. After graduating she worked first as a cleaner, then as a nursing assistant, and in parallel she completed her matric through a correspondence course with Sukses College.

Her political activism first landed her in jail and then led her into exile, conditions that forced her to discontinue her education. Only in 1990 when Namibia became independent did she resume her studies. She obtained a Diploma in Adult and Basic Education from UNISA and a Diploma in Gender Development and Planning from the University of London. She further holds a Diploma in Women in Management, has had some paralegal education, and acquired counselling and facilitation skills.

== Political career ==
In the early 1980s Namises joined the then-illegal SWAPO party. She organised meetings, acquired new members, and distributed promotional material. She was caught and spent two months in solitary confinement but soon returned to her activist's activities. In 1985 she lost her job in the hospital after having been seen holding hands in public with a white doctor, violating apartheid legislation on racial segregation. She was also jailed a second time for her political activities, this time for 14 months.

Once released she was offered a job by the Catholic Church as community development officer. In the same year Ben Ulenga was released from Robben Island prison. Namises and Ulenga met and became a couple soon thereafter. When she was pregnant with their second child in 1987 but they still refused to marry each other, Namises was fired. She also abandoned her Catholic faith at that time, and for that reason. Namises then went into exile and worked in Europe and America. She only returned after the Independence of Namibia in 1990. Not long thereafter several past human rights violations by SWAPO were uncovered. When the party subsequently erected a wall of silence instead of reappraising what had happened, Namises ceased her SWAPO membership in 1992.

When the Congress of Democrats (CoD) was founded in 1999, Namises was one of its founding members. In the subsequent parliamentary elections, the CoD gained seven seats, and Namises as secretary-general became a Member of Parliament for the 3rd National Assembly. When the CoD only gained five seats in the next elections in 2004, Namises was one of the politicians who did not return to parliament. However, after the party expelled Nora Schimming-Chase in 2009, Namises took her seat for the remainder of the legislative period.

== Activism ==
As Namises went in and out of politics, she spent the time in between as an activist and lobbyist. Her first formal role was her work at the Legal Assistance Centre in the early 1990s, a job she took after quitting SWAPO. She helped to discover and fight human rights violations there, a step she described as "revenge".

She is the director of Woman Solidarity Namibia, an organisation fighting violence against women and children. Namises is also the founder and main operator of Dolam Residential Child Care, a day-care facility for vulnerable children. There are currently 21 children at the centre.

== In the media ==
- Rosa und Uria, a German film about Rosa Namises and Uria Kariere's lives at the eve of Namibian independence
- Portrait einer beeindruckenden Frau [Portrait of an impressive woman], by Dora Borer
