= Reggie Diergaardt =

Namibian politician (born 1957)

- Born: 9 August 1957 (age 69); Upington, Northern Cape, South Africa
- Occupation: Businessman

Reggie Diergaardt (born 9 August 1957) is a Namibian politician and member of the National Assembly of Namibia.

Prior to Namibian independence in 1990, Diergaardt was the leader of the South West African Labour Party and one of the founding members of the United Democratic Front (UDF). From 1989 to 1995 he served in the Constituent Assembly of Namibia and in the 1st National Assembly of Namibia on a UDF ticket. He was appointed deputy ministry of Trade and Industry in 1990. In 1991 he was given the Youth and Sport portfolio, again as deputy minister, a position he held until 1993.

Diergaardt became a member of SWAPO and was appointed by former president Hifikepunye Pohamba as one of six non-voting members of parliament. He served his full term. In 2020 he gained a third term in the National Assembly, this time for the Popular Democratic Movement (PDM).
