= Abner Nuule =

Namibian politician (1935–2023)

Member of the Constituent Assembly of Namibia
- In office November 1989 – March 1990

Member of the National Assembly of Namibia
- In office March 1990 – 1995

Personal details
- Born: 12 February 1935
- Died: 30 July 2023 (aged 88)
- Party: DTA

Abner Nuule (12 February 1935 – 30 July 2023) was a Namibian politician. A member of the Democratic Turnhalle Alliance, he served in the Constituent Assembly from 1989 to 1990 and then the National Assembly from 1990 to 2023.

Nuule died on 30 July 2023, at the age of 88.
