= Anton von Wietersheim =

Namibian politician (born 1951)

Anton von Wietersheim (born 10 June 1951) is a Namibian politician. Wietersheim was a member of the Constituent Assembly of Namibia from 1989 to 1990 and was elected to the National Assembly as a SWAPO candidate in 1990. He served as Minister of Agriculture from 1992 until he resigned in 1993.

In August 2009, Wietersheim re-entered politics as a member of the Rally for Democracy and Progress (RDP), an opposition party that was created by dissident members of SWAPO. At the party congress in September 2009, Wietersheim was placed at the 5th spot, which was just below the party's central committee. In the November 2009 parliamentary election, he was one of eight RDP candidates to win seats in the National Assembly.

In September 2010, von Wietersheim and eight other opposition politicians were sworn in as members of the National Assembly following a six-month boycott due to perceived electoral irregularities in the 2009 election which were proven false by the supreme court of Namibia.
