= Nangolo Ithete =

Namibian politician (1941–2002)

Nangolo Herman Ithete (22 May 1941 - 23 September 2002) was a Namibian politician. Ithete was born in Okahao, Omusati Region and joined SWAPO in the early 1960s. He went into exile with SWAPO to Dar es Salaam, Tanzania in 1963. He studied in Yugoslavia until 1975. From 1976 to 1985, he was SWAPO's chief representative in Zambia and from 1985 to 1989 chief representative in Nigeria. Upon independence in 1990, Ithete was elected to the 1st and 2nd National Assemblies. He also served as a deputy minister of Home Affairs (1990-94), later of Environment and Tourism (1995-2000). He died in Windhoek in September 2002.
