= Vekuii Rukoro =

Namibian politician and paramount chief (1954–2021)

Attorney General of Namibia
- In office 1995 – March 2000
- President: Sam Nujoma
- Preceded by: Hartmut Ruppel
- Succeeded by: Ngarikutuke Tjiriange

Member of the National Assembly
- In office 11 November 1989 – 2000
- Constituency: Namibia National Front

Personal details
- Born: 11 November 1954 Otjiwarongo, South West Africa
- Died: 18 June 2021 (aged 66) Windhoek, Namibia
- Cause of death: COVID-19
- Party: SWANU (1975–1978, c. 1984–c. 1995); SWANU-P (1978–c. 1984); SWAPO (from c. 1995)
- Education: University of Warwick (LLB, 1983); Washington College of Law (LLM, 1987)

Paramount chief of the Herero
- Reign: September 2014 – 18 June 2021
- Predecessor: Kuaima Riruako
- Successor: Vipuira Kapuuo

Vekuii Reinhard Rukoro (11 November 1954 – 18 June 2021) was a Namibian politician and paramount chief of the Herero people. He was also Attorney General of Namibia from 1995 to 2000 and a member of the National Assembly from 1989 to 2000.

== Early life and education ==
Rukoro was born on 11 November 1954, in Otjiwarongo. He attended primary school in Swakopmund and Karibib, and secondary school at Döbra. In 1980 he started tertiary education and obtained an LLB (Honours) degree from the University of Warwick (Coventry, England) in 1983, and an LLM degree from the Washington College of Law (Washington, D.C., United States) in 1987.

== Career ==
Rukoro joined the South West Africa National Union (SWANU) in 1975 and became its secretary-general but left with a group of dissidents in 1978 to form the South West Africa National Union Progressives (SWANU-P). He returned to SWANU, again became secretary-general in 1984, and the party's president in 1989.

SWANU, like SWANU-P, merged into the Namibia National Front (NNF) prior to the 1989 elections that preceded Namibia's independence. Rukoro became president of the NNF and took the only seat gained by the party. He thus became a member of the Constituent Assembly of Namibia where he was one of the main drafters of the Constitution of Namibia.

After Namibian independence in 1990 Rukoro was appointed Deputy Minister of Justice. He served until 1995 when, by then a member of SWAPO, he occupied the position of attorney-general. He entered a business career in 2000 as Managing Director of Sanlam Namibia, chairman of Air Namibia, and CEO of First National Bank (2006–2013) and thereafter served as CEO of Meat Corporation of Namibia (Meatco).

== OvaHerero chieftainship ==
After the June 2014 death of Kuaima Riruako left the position of the paramount chieftaincy of the OvaHerero people vacant, Fanuel Tumbee Tjombe briefly served as the acting chief. He died weeks after taking the position. In September 2014, Rukoro was appointed paramount chief. In his acceptance speech he reportedly "had to fight back tears".

== Death ==
He died on 18 June 2021 at the age of 66 from the consequences of a COVID-19 infection in Windhoek during the COVID-19 pandemic in Namibia.

Preceded by Kuaima Riruako	Paramount Chief of the Herero people 2014–2021	Succeeded by Vacant
