= List of members of the Constituent Assembly of Namibia =

Constituent Assembly of Namibia

Type
- Type: Unicameral

History
- Founded: 1989

Structure
- Seats: 72
- Political groups: SWAPO (41) DTA (21) UDF (4) ACN (3) Other (3)

Elections
- Last election: 7–11 November 1989

Below is a list of members of the Constituent Assembly of Namibia, which became the National Assembly of Namibia upon independence in March 1990. Individual members were selected by political parties voted for in the 1989 election, the first democratic, multi-racial and universal franchise elections in Namibian history. Upon Namibian independence on 21 March 1990, the Constituent Assembly closed, and its members formed the 1st National Assembly of Namibia.

The seat distribution per party was as follows:

- South West Africa People's Organization (SWAPO): 41
- Democratic Turnhalle Alliance (DTA): 21
- United Democratic Front (UDF): 4
- Action Christian National (ACN): 3
- Namibia National Front (NNF): 1
- Namibia Patriotic Front (NPF): 1
- Federal Convention of Namibia (FCN): 1

== Members ==
The following people were elected to the Constituent Assembly:

=== SWAPO ===
1. Matti Amadhila
2. Ben Amathila
3. Libertina Amathila
4. Nahas Angula
5. Helmut Ausiku
6. Niko Bessinger
7. Willem Biwa
8. Daniel Botha
9. Jerry Ekandjo
10. Moses ǁGaroëb
11. Hage Geingob
12. Theo-Ben Gurirab
13. Hidipo Hamutenya
14. Marco Hausiku
15. Hadino Hishongwa
16. Joshua Hoebeb
17. Michaela Hübschle
18. Pendukeni Iivula-Ithana
19. Nickey Iyambo
20. Richard Kapelwa Kabajani
21. Zephania Kameeta
22. Peter Katjavivi
23. Willem Konjore
24. Nathaniel Maxuilili
25. Kaire Mbuende
26. Nangolo Mbumba
27. David Meroro
28. Peter Mweshihange
29. Kapuka Nauyala
30. Sam Nujoma
31. John Ya Otto
32. Hifikepunye Pohamba
33. Hartmut Ruppel
34. Pashukeni Shoombe
35. Ngarikutuke Tjiriange
36. Mose Penaani Tjitendero – Speaker
37. Andimba Toivo ya Toivo
38. Peter Tsheehama
39. Ben Ulenga
40. Buddy Wentworth
41. Anton von Wietersheim
42. Hendrik Witbooi
43. Siegfried Wohler

=== DTA ===
1. Ben Africa
2. Leonard Barnes
3. Magareth Barnes
4. Gabriel Dan
5. Johannes ǀGaseb
6. Allois Gende
7. Joseph Haraseb
8. Jeremia Jagger
9. Petrus Junius
10. Geelboy Kashe
11. Katuutire Kaura
12. Constance Kgosiemang
13. Fanuel Kozonguizi
14. Daniel Luipert
15. Alfons Majavero
16. Andrew Matjila
17. Dirk Mudge
18. Mishake Muyongo
19. Abner Nuule
20. Hans-Erik Staby
21. Charles van Wyk

=== UDF ===
1. Justus ǁGaroëb
2. Reggie Diergaardt
3. Eric Biwa
4. Theophelus Soroseb

=== ACN ===
1. Kosie Pretorius
2. Jan de Wet
3. Walter Aston

=== NNF ===
1. Vekuii Rukoro

=== NPF ===
1. Moses Katjioungua

=== FCN ===
1. Johannes Diergaardt; resigned shortly after being elected and was replaced by Mburumba Kerina
