= Pashukeni Shoombe =

Namibian politician and educator

Pashukeni Shoombe (born 12 December 1936 in Ohangwena Region) is a Namibian politician and educator. Shoombe was a teacher in Ohangwena Region, Ovamboland from 1958 to 1974, when she went into exile with the South West Africa People's Organization (SWAPO). While in exile, Shoombe played a prominent role in the handling of her fellow exiles in Angola, for which she received a UNESCO Literacy Award in 1991. In 1980, she earned a diploma from the United Nations Institute for Namibia in Zambia. In 1989, she was elected to the Constituent Assembly of Namibia, which wrote the Namibian Constitution. She was subsequently also elected to the 2nd National Assembly.

Shoombe was conferred the Most Distinguished Order of Namibia: First Class on Heroes' Day 2014.
