= Hadino Hishongwa =

Namibian politician (1943–2023)

The Honorable Hadino Hishongwa
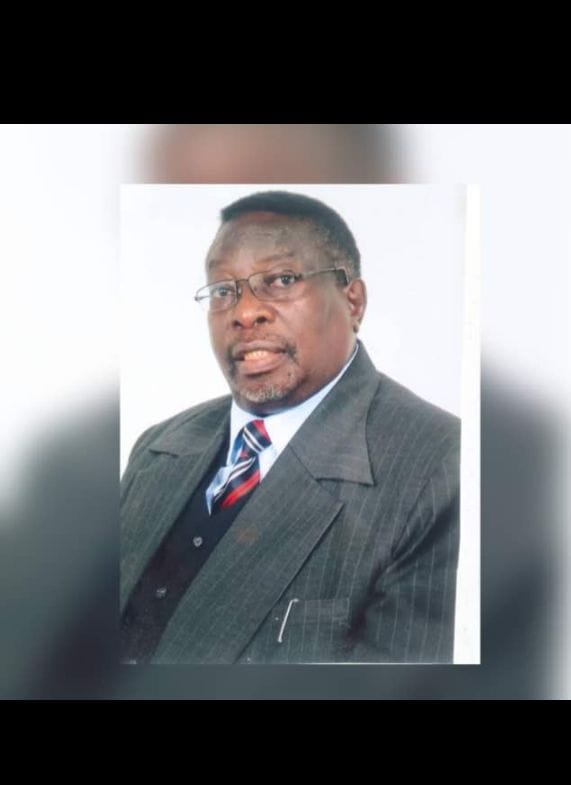

Deputy Minister of Youth and Sport
- In office 1995–2005
- President: Sam Nujoma

Deputy Minister of Labour and Manpower Development
- In office 21 March 1990 – 1995
- President: Sam Nujoma
- Preceded by: position established

Personal details
- Born: 10 April 1943 Odibo, Ohangwena Region, South West Africa
- Died: 1 September 2023 (aged 80) Ongwediva, Namibia
- Party: SWAPO
- Spouse: Ester N Nghishiiko
- Occupation: Politician

Hadino Timothy Hishongwa (10 April 1943 – 31 August 2023) was a Namibia politician, diplomat, parliamentarian, and a founding member of SWAPO.

== Life and career ==
Hadino Hishongwa was born on 10 April 1943 in Odibo in Ovamboland, South West Africa (today the Ohangwena Region of Namibia). He was a cousin of Namibia's 2nd president Hifikepunye Pohamba.

During the Namibian War of Independence Hishongwa was SWAPO's chief representative to Scandinavia, West Germany and Austria from 1977 to 1983. Hishongwa was appointed deputy minister of Labour and Manpower Development upon independence of Namibia in 1990. In 1995 he was transferred to the Youth and Sport ministry, again as deputy minister. He held this position until 2005.

Hishongwa was a member of the National Assembly of Namibia with SWAPO from the constituent assembly in 1989 until the conclusion of the 3rd National Assembly in 2005. After that Hishongwa was appointed High Commissioner to neighbouring Botswana. In April 2011, he was replaced in Botswana by the former ambassador to South Africa, Philemon Kambala.

On Heroes' Day 2014, he was conferred the Excellent Order of the Eagle, First Class.

Hishongwa was married to fellow SWAPO activist Ndeutala Angolo, with whom he had two children. He died on 1 September 2023, at the age of 80 and was buried at Eenhana Memorial Shrine on 16 September 2023.
