= Peter Tsheehama =

Namibian military commander, diplomat, and politician

Angura Peter Tshirumbu Tsheehama (1941–2010) was a commander in the People's Liberation Army of Namibia, diplomat, chief of intelligence, and Namibian minister.

== Biography ==
Tsheehama was born on 31 March 1941 at Onangodhi in the Omusati Region. He was educated at St Joseph's Teacher Training Centre in Döbra from 1963 to 1964 and afterwards taught at Iipanda ya Amithi in northern Namibia. Tsheehama entered SWAPO soon after its inception. In January 1966 he went into exile, first to Botswana where he taught literacy classes, then to Zambia where he furthered his own education. In 1969 he graduated from Nkumbi International College with a qualification in politics.

He then moved to Angola, and from there to Russia where in the 1970s he studied at the Lenin Institute of Ideological Studies in Moscow. In 1984, he received a Diploma in Military Science in Yugoslavia. He moved to Havana, Cuba, that same year to represent SWAPO in Central and South America and the Caribbean. Tsheehama only returned to Namibia in 1989, shortly before the country became independent.

Even as a government minister, Tsheehama kept a generally low profile and rarely gave interviews or hosted press conferences. He was married and had children. Tsheehama retired in 2008 due to medical problems. He died on 3 October 2010 in Otjiwarongo and was buried in a state funeral at Heroes' Acre near Windhoek.

== Military career ==
Tsheehama joined the People's Liberation Army of Namibia (PLAN) in 1969 and became commander in the early 1970s. One year later he was appointed to the PLAN military council, and in 1976 he became SWAPO military attaché in Angola. At that time he had risen to PLAN Deputy Chief of Administration. He was promoted to Chief of Administration in 1984.

== Political career ==
Tsheehama joined SWAPO in the early 1960s and remained a member until he died. He set up a SWAPO office at Katanga, Zaire in 1974 and at that time became the party representative to Central Africa, a position he held until 1986. He was elected to serve in the SWAPO central committee since 1983, a position he held until 2002.

At the advent of Namibia's independence Tsheehama returned to Namibia. He was a member of the Constituent Assembly in 1989 and 1990 that drafted the Namibian Constitution. After SWAPO won the 1990 elections, he deputised the Minister of State Security until 1994, and then became Special Advisor to president Sam Nujoma on National Security. From 2005 to 2008 he served as Minister for Safety and Security.

Peter Tsheehama was the head of Namibia's intelligence since independence although his title changed several times. At the establishment of the Namibia Central Intelligence Service in 1998 he became its first director general. During his service the institution became informally known as Tshirumbu's people, in reference to one of his first names.
