= Matias Ndakolo =

Namibian military commander and guerrilla fighter

Matias 'Mbulunganga' Ndakolo (born 25 December 1943 – 4 December 2018) was a revered military commander and a guerrilla fighter of the People Liberation Army of Namibia (PLAN) a military wing of South West Africa People's Organisation (SWAPO). He was a founding PLAN commander of north-east front during Namibian War of Independence.

== PLAN career ==
Mbulunganga Ndakolo joined OPO in 1959 and subsequently became a SWAPO member in 1960. He left MPLA and joined SWAPO military wing PLAN in 1964 in Lusaka, Zamibia after the military training in Soviet Union 1964. He began conducting military operationin Namibia in the area of Katima Mulilo and across Cuando river in Angola.

== Honours and decorations ==
Although Mbulunganga Ndakolo was unable to serve in independent Namibia Defence Force (NDF) due to ill-health, he was conferred an hononary military rank of a colonel in the Namibian Defence Force in 2007.

== Death ==
Colonel Mbulunganga Ndakolo died at the age of 75 on 4 December 2018 and he was accorded a state funeral by President Hage Geigob and he was laid to rest at Eenhana memorial shrine on 15 December 2018.
