= Cuba–Namibia relations =

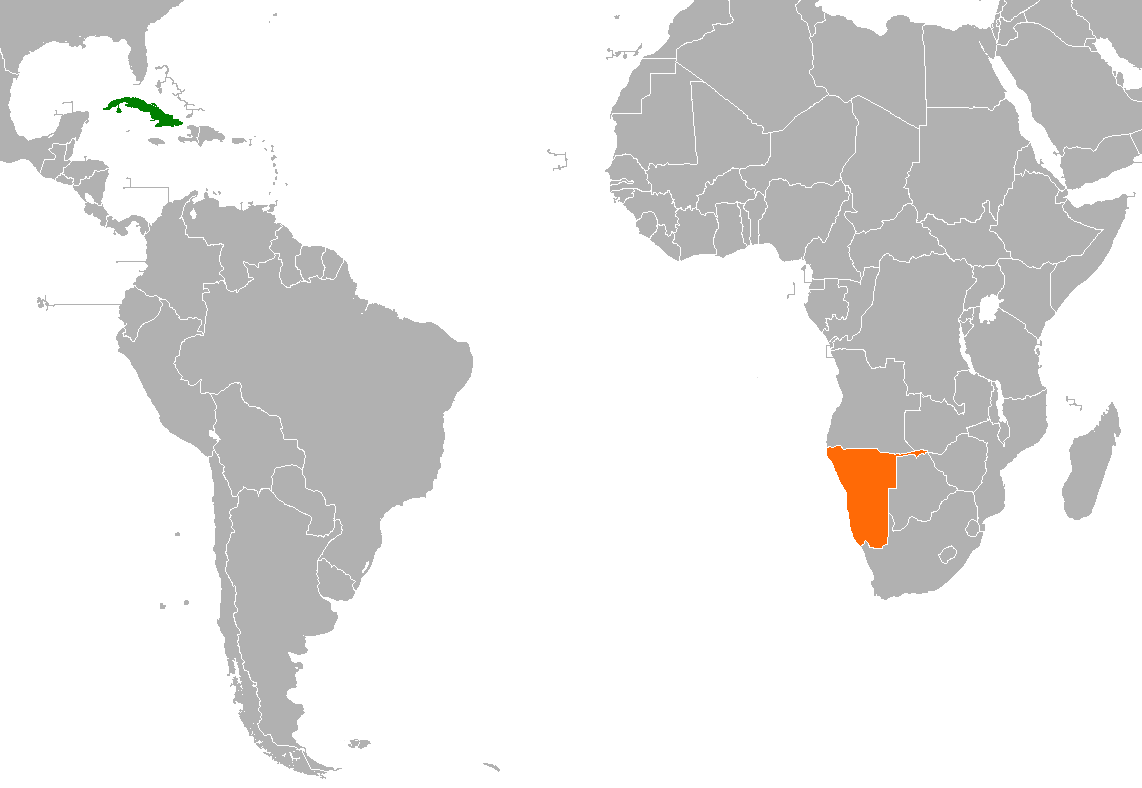

- Cuba: Namibia

Cuba–Namibia relations are the bilateral relations between Cuba and Namibia. Both nations are members of the Group of 77, Non-Aligned Movement and the United Nations. The current ambassador of Namibia to Cuba is Lebbius Tobias.

== History ==
In 1884, present-day Namibia was colonized by Germany. After World War I, with the signing of the Treaty of Versailles, Germany was forced to transfer its territory to the Union of South Africa in 1920, which at the time was a self-governing dominion of the British Empire. Namibia would be called South West Africa for the next 70 years. South West Africa was not allowed to be annexed by South Africa, rather it was governed as a mandated territory.

In 1961, South Africa became a republic and continued to govern Namibia under its Apartheid rule. In 1966, SWAPO launched an armed struggle against South African occupation which became known as the South African Border War. In 1975, Cuba involved itself in the Angolan Civil War by sending troops in support of the communist-aligned People's Movement for the Liberation of Angola (MPLA) against the pro-western National Union for the Total Independence of Angola (UNITA). South African forces invaded Angola during Operation Savannah in support of the UNITA forces. In Angola, Cuban forces increased to 50,000 soldiers and fought along SWAPO soldiers against South African troops.

In December 1988, the Tripartite Accord among Angola, Cuba and South Africa was signed at the United Nations in New York City. The accords granted Namibia independence and called for the removal of Cuban troops from Angola. In March 1990, Namibia gained independence from South Africa. Soon afterwards, Cuba and Namibia officially established diplomatic relations and opened resident embassies.

In March 1991, Namibian President Sam Nujoma paid an official visit to Cuba and met with President Fidel Castro. While in Cuba, both nations signed a protocol agreement. In September 1998, Cuban President Fidel Castro paid an official visit to Namibia and met with President Sam Nujoma. Since then, there have been numerous visits between leaders of both nations. In November 2016, Namibian President Hage Geingob paid a visit to Cuba to attend the funeral of Fidel Castro.

Since the establishment of diplomatic relations, Cuba has sent hundreds of doctors and other professionals in assist in Namibia's health, construction and educational sectors. In 2020, both nations celebrated 30 years of diplomatic relations.

== Resident diplomatic missions ==
- Cuba has an embassy in Windhoek.
- Namibia has an embassy in Havana.

== Diplomatic staff ==
- Lebbius Tobias, Namibia's ambassador to Cuba (2025–)

== See also ==
- Cuban intervention in Angola
- Foreign interventions by Cuba
