= Democratic Coalition of Namibia =

Poitical party (1994–2009)

- Founder: Moses Katjiuongua
- Founded: 1994
- Dissolved: 2009
- Preceded by: Namibia Patriotic Front

The Democratic Coalition of Namibia (DCN) was a political party in Namibia. It was founded in 1994 as the successor of the Namibia Patriotic Front (NPF) which already had a seat in Parliament. Several members of the Democratic Turnhalle Alliance and the Action Christian National also joined the new party.

The DCN contested the 1994 Namibian general election. After winning only one seat, the party's sole representative in the National Assembly became party leader Moses Katjiuongua. It contested the 1998 local authority elections in Opuwo and gained one of seven seats in the town council.

The party failed to win a seat in the 1999 Namibian general election and did not contest the 2004 Namibian general election. It was deregistered in 2009.

== See also ==
- List of political parties in Namibia
