= John Shaetonhodi =

Namibian politician and trade unionist

John Mueneni Shaetonhodi (born 1 May 1949) is a Namibian politician, businessperson and trade unionist.

== Career ==
Shaetonhodi worked for the Consolidated Diamond Mines, the Namibian subsidiary of De Beers, in the 1980s and became the first president of the Mineworkers Union of Namibia from 1986 to 1995. He lived and worked in the southern town of Oranjemund, where he was an activist with SWAPO during the Namibian War of Independence. He was detained without trial by the South African forces from April 1979 to January 1980 and placed under house arrest from 1980 to 1983.

== Political life ==
Shaetonhodi became a member of the National Assembly of Namibia in 1995. In that same year, he was appointed deputy Minister of Labour and Human Resources and served as acting Minister of Labour and Social Welfare from 1997 to 1999 following the death of Moses ǁGaroëb. From 1999 until he left the National Assembly in 2002, he served as deputy Minister of Works, Transport and Communication. In 2001 while still in the cabinet of Namibia, Shaetonhodi was named director of the railway parastatal TransNamib. He stayed as director of TransNamib until August 2007, when his contract was not renewed.
