= Gustaphine Tjombe =

Namibian politician

Personal details
- Party: United Democratic Front

Gustaphine Tjombe is a Namibian politician. A member of the United Democratic Front, Tjombe was a member of the National Assembly from 2003 to 2010. She was sworn into the National Assembly to replace Eric Biwa, who had resigned. She was elected in 2004 as part of the UDF's list in the country's proportional representation system. She is a board member of the National Society for Human Rights of Namibia and UDF's administrative secretary.
