= Buddy Wentworth =

South African-born Namibian politician (1937–2014)

The Honorable Buddy Wentworth

Deputy minister of Education, Culture, Youth and Sport
- In office 1990 – 21 March 1995
- President: Sam Nujoma
- Preceded by: position established

Deputy minister of Higher Education and Vocational Training
- In office 21 March 1995 – 2005
- President: Sam Nujoma
- Preceded by: position established

Personal details
- Born: James Wilfred Wentworth; 17 January 1937
- Died: 4 June 2014 (aged 77) Olympia, Windhoek, Namibia
- Party: SWAPO
- Children: 10
- Occupation: Politician
- Profession: Teacher

James Wilfred "Buddy" Wentworth (17 January 1937 – 4 June 2014) was a Namibian politician. He was a member of the SWAPO fraction of the Constituent Assembly of Namibia and served as deputy minister in several education-related portfolios in the first, second and third National Assemblies of Namibia. At the time he retired in 2005 he was one of two longest serving deputy ministers of Namibia.

Wentworth came to Namibia from South Africa in 1970 and worked as teacher in Rehoboth, and as school principal at Tamariskia Primary School, Swakopmund. He joined SWAPO in 1972.

Wentworth was a founding chairperson of the Franco-Namibian Cultural Centre in Windhoek, and chaired the National Commission for Unesco. He was a practicing Muslim. He was married twice, and had 10 children. Wentworth was a recipient of the Ordre des Palmes Académiques for his contribution to the Namibian independence struggle. He died of heart failure on 4 June 2014 at his home in Olympia, Windhoek, aged 77.
