= Jeremia Nambinga =

Namibian politician

President of the Rally for Democracy and Progress
- In office 2015–2018
- Preceded by: Hidipo Hamutenya
- Succeeded by: Mike Kavekotora

Member of the National Assembly of Namibia
- In office 1994 – 2008

Deputy Minister of Home Affairs
- In office 1995 – 2000

Deputy Minister of Prisons and Correctional Services
- In office 2000 – 2005
- Preceded by: Michaela Hübschle

Personal details
- Born: December 13, 1946 (age 79) Ohangwena region
- Party: SWAPO (until 2008); RDP (from 2008)
- Spouse: Hileni Namutenya Nambinga
- Children: 6, including Saima Nambinga and Ndilimeke Nambinga

Jeremia Nambinga (born December 13, 1946) is a Namibian politician. Since 2008, Nambinga has been a member of the Rally for Democracy and Progress (RDP), and was the party's president from 2015 to 2018.

== Career ==
A long-serving member of Swapo party, Nambinga was Deputy Minister of Home Affairs and a member of the National Assembly of Namibia beginning in 1995. In 2000 he was transferred to the Ministry of Prisons and Correctional Services where he served as Deputy Minister until 2004. For the following election period he almost missed his place in the National Assembly, being #56 on the SWAPO's party list with 55 seats won. He re-entered as backbencher when Philemon Malima retired soon after the election.

Nambinga resigned in November 2007 after being informally accused of being an "agent of imperialism" at a SWAPO party conference. In March 2008, Nambinga joined the newly formed Rally for Democracy and Progress (RDP). Prior to RDP's first general election in September 2009, Nambinga was placed at number 14 of 72 total names on the party list for the National Assembly. He became RDP's president in 2015. He was voted out of that position by a no-confidence vote in 2017 but challenged the result in court, and won. In August 2018 he resigned his presidency.
