= Daniel Tjongarero =

Namibian politician and independence activist

Daniel Jeundikwa Kaova Tjongarero (1947 - 23 April 1997) was a Namibian politician and independence activist. He graduated in 1973 at the University of the North now the University of Limpopo. He was a member of the Constituent Assembly of Namibia tasked with crafting the Constitution of the new Republic. He became a member of the National Assembly (Namibia) at independence until 1995.

He was married to Agnes Tjongarero.

He was the head of the Namibian delegation in 1989 that met the Democratic Turnhalle Alliance (DTA) in Pretoria, South Africa to reitarate the commitment to Resolution 435.
