= Moses Katjiuongua =

Namibian politician

Moses Katjikuru Katjiuongua (24 April 1942 – 8 March 2011) was a Namibian politician, minister in the Transitional Government of National Unity, member of the Constituent Assembly of Namibia, and member of the National Assembly of Namibia.

== Early life, education, and exile ==
Katjiuongua attended primary school in Aminuis, and from 1956 to 1959 the Swedish Confederation of Labour college in Bechuanaland (now Botswana). His political activities continued concurrently with his studies. After graduation, he went into exile to work in the South West African National Union (SWANU) office in Cairo, Egypt. From 1961 to 1962 he studied journalism in Magdeburg, East Germany on a SWANU bursary.

Katjiuongua met Mao Zedong during a trip to China after 1963. From there he returned to Tanzania, again to work in the SWANU office.

Katjiuongua also held a BA in political science and administration and an MA in international affairs, economics, human geography and theoretical philosophy from Stockholm University which he obtained on a study trip between 1978 and 1980. He further completed a master's degree in public administration at Carleton University in Ottawa, Ontario, Canada.

== Return to Namibia ==
In 1982, Katjiuongua returned to Namibia and became the president of SWANU. In that position, he led the SWANU delegation to the Multi-Party Conference in September 1983, but his party split on the question of participation in the internal settlement. A congress called by opponents relieved him and his supporters of their posts on the Central Committee in 1984. This weakened the party's influence.

On 10 May 1985, he was appointed Minister of Manpower, National Health and Welfare in the cabinet of the Transitional Government of National Unity (TGNU). He contested the November 1989 pre-independence elections as candidate of the National Patriotic Front (NPF) party founded by him shortly before, and he was the only member of the party to win a seat. In the 1994 elections he started for the Democratic Coalition of Namibia (DCN), the successor of NPF, and again won the only parliamentary seat. In the 1999 elections the DCN failed to win a set. Katjiuongua disbanded the party in 2003.

Katjiuongua was married to Rebecca Matjituavi. They had four children.
