= Hans-Erik Staby =

Namibian politician

Hans-Erik Staby

Hans-Erik Staby (8 September 1935 in Otjimbingwe-30 November 2009 in Windhoek) was a Namibian politician and one of the country's leading architects. A German Namibian, Staby was a member of the National Assembly of Namibia from the Constituent Assembly prior to independence in 1989 until resignation in 1997 with the Democratic Turnhalle Alliance (DTA). Staby died on 30 November 2009 at his home in Windhoek.

He was elected to the White Legislative Assembly in 1980 as a member of the Republican Party (RP), which was then part of the DTA. He served in newly independent Namibia's Constituent Assembly in 1990 and was the DTA spokesperson on trade and finance in the NA from 1990 to 1997. In November 2003 he joined Action for Democratic Change – a group of former RP members who decided to stay with the DTA rather than join the breakaway led by Henk Mudge.

Described as a "true Namibian" by the executive director of the Dag Hammarskjöld Foundation, Henning Melber, Staby worked tirelessly for the promotion of democracy and human rights in Namibia.

Staby was the Chairperson of the Namibia Institute for Democracy (NID) and of the Namibian-German Foundation. He was also a member of the Namibian branch of the anti-corruption watchdog, Transparency International (TI). He was the President of the Namibia Cricket Board (NCB) from 1986 to 1999 and Patron of the NCB from 2000 to 2003. Staby made a valid and tremendous impact on the development of cricket in Namibia. He was a gifted speaker and was able to relate and recall many stories on the early days of cricket in Namibia. He played league cricket for Wanderers Cricket Club and after retiring from the game became the club’s and national team cricket scorer. He subsequently became President of Wanderers Cricket Club and was responsible for building a successful and popular club with not only wonderful cricket but squash, hockey and rugby facilities. After standing down as president Hans-Erik Staby was bestowed as an Honorary member of Cricket Namibia.

Survivors include his wife, brother, two sisters, four sons and 11 grandchildren.

== Education ==
Staby obtained a Bachelor of Architecture degree, University of Cape Town, South Africa (1959) and enlisted with the Technische Universität Berlin, West Germany (1960) for post-graduate studies.
