= Zephania Kameeta =

Namibian bishop and politician (born 1945)

The Reverend Zephania Kameeta
- Bishop
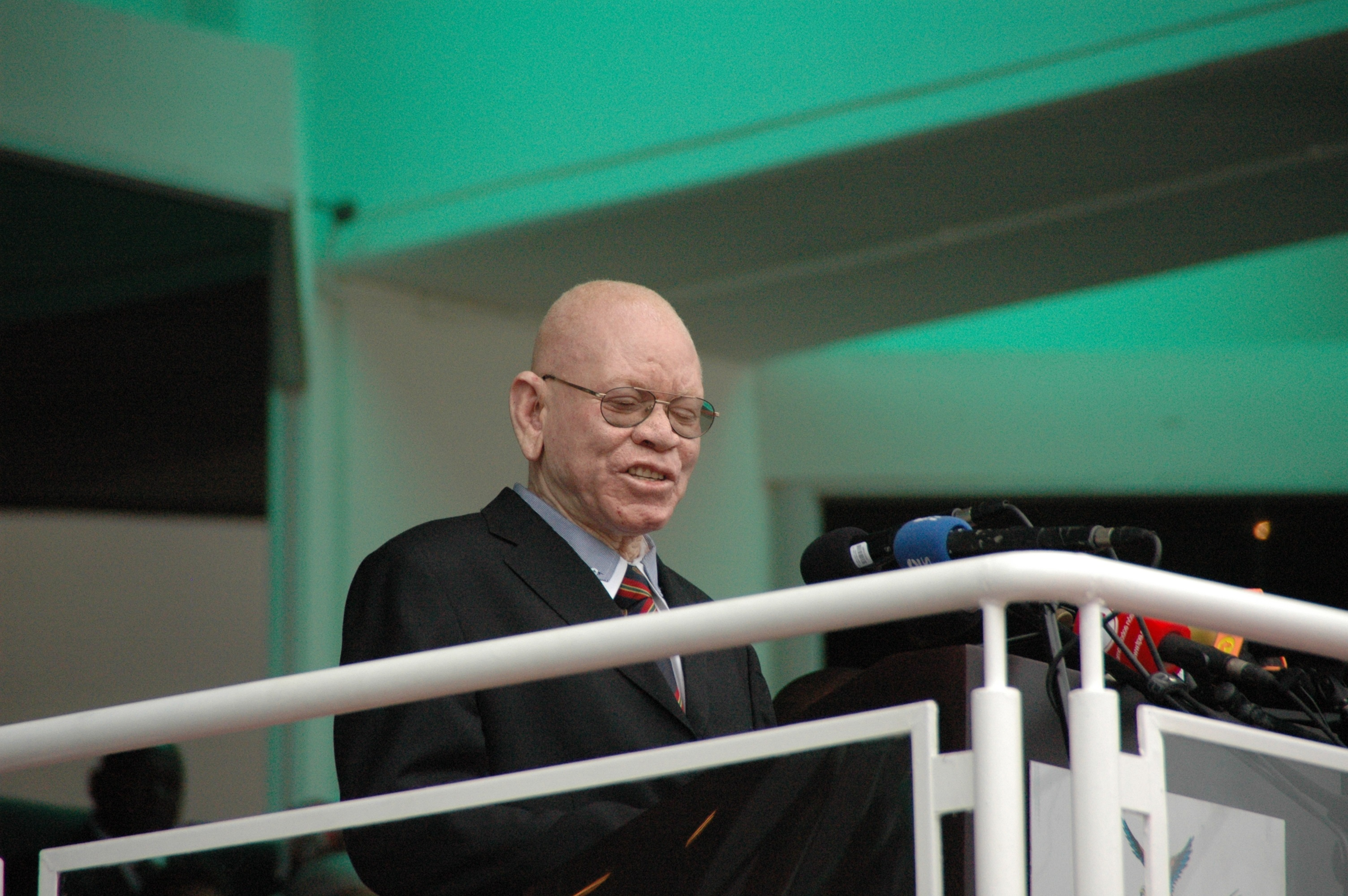
- Church: Evangelical Lutheran Church in the Republic of Namibia
- In office: 2002–2013

Personal details
- Born: 7 August 1945 (age 81) Otjimbingwe, Erongo Region

Zephania Kameeta (born 7 August 1945 in Otjimbingwe, Erongo Region) is a Namibian religious and political leader. Since March 2015, he has been the Namibian Minister of Poverty Eradication and Social Welfare.

== Religious work ==
Kameeta studied at the Paulinum Seminary at Otjimbingwe from 1968 to 1971. He was ordained as a minister of the Evangelical Lutheran Church in 1972, and taught at the Paulinum Seminary from 1973, serving as its principal 1976–77.

Kameeta served as a parish minister in Lüderitz from 1978 to 1981. He was elected vice-president of the Evangelical Lutheran Church in 1982 and deputy bishop in 1985. Between 2002 and 2013 Kameeta was bishop of the Evangelical Lutheran Church in the Republic of Namibia (ELCRN). From 2003 to 2010 he also served as the Lutheran World Federation's vice-president for the Africa region.

Kameeta is an exponent of liberation theology. He is best known for his rendition of Psalm 23 which he wrote in 1973:

The Lord is my shepherd;
I have everything I need.
He lets me see a country of justice and peace
And directs my steps towards this land.
He gives me power.
He guides me in the paths of victory,
As he has promised
Even if a full scale violent confrontation breaks out
I will not be afraid, Lord,
For you are with me.
Your shepherd's power and love protect me.
You prepare me for my freedom,
Where all my enemies can see it;
You welcome me as an honoured guest
And fill my cup with righteousness and peace.
I know that your goodness and love
Will be with me all my life; and your liberating love will be my home
As long as I live.

This poem was later published in his Why, O Lord?: Psalms and Sermons from Namibia (Augsburg Fortress, 1986) and included in Pocket Prayers for Peace and Justice (Church House Publishing, 2004).

== Political work ==
In 1975, Kameeta founded the Namibia National Convention, a group founded to promote Black Consciousness. He was arrested by the South African authorities for protesting against the Turnhalle Constitutional Conference.

Kameeta served as a member of the Central Committee of the South West Africa People's Organisation (SWAPO) from 1977 to 2002. When Namibia became independent in 1990 he was elected as a SWAPO member of the National Assembly, becoming its first Deputy Speaker. In 1997 he was elected to SWAPO's Politburo where he remained until 2002.

Kameeta was one of the pioneers of the Basic Income Grant Coalition. In 2015, he was appointed Minister for Poverty Eradication and Social Welfare.

Kameeta has albinism. His prominent role in society has helped others with albinism gain better understanding and acceptance.

== Recognition ==
On Heroes' Day 2014 he was conferred the Most Brilliant Order of the Sun, First Class.

== Bibliography ==
- Pütz, Joachim; von Egidy, Heidi; Caplan, Perri (1990). Namibia handbook and political who's who. Windhoek: Magus. ISBN 0-620-14172-7.
