= Ben Ulenga =

Namibian politician

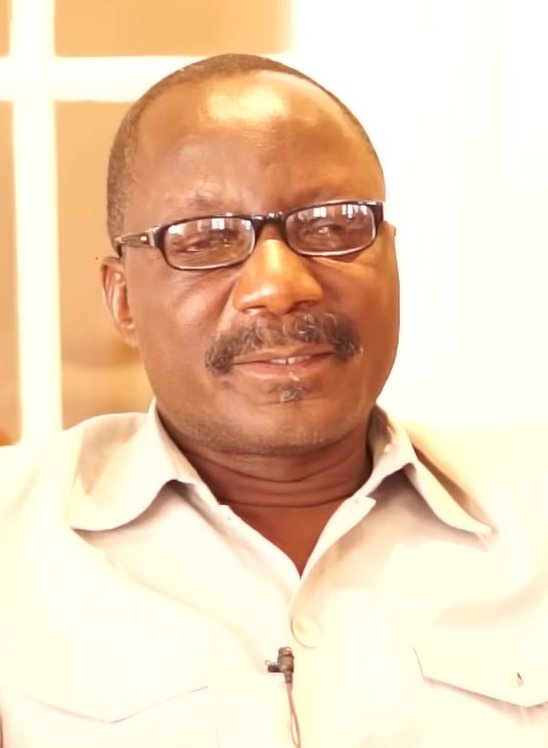

Ben Ulenga (born Benjamin Crispus Ulenga on 22 June 1952) is a Namibian trade unionist, politician, and diplomat. In the 1990s, he served under the SWAPO government as a deputy minister and as an ambassador, but he left SWAPO in 1998 and founded an opposition party, the Congress of Democrats (CoD), in 1999. He was a member of the National Assembly of Namibia from 2000 to 2015 and led the CoD until 2015.

== Life and career ==
Ulenga, born in Ontanga, Oshana Region, played an influential role in the independence struggle of Namibia against South African apartheid rule. He joined the People's Liberation Army of Namibia in 1974 but was later captured after being wounded in combat and sentenced to 15 years in prison, which he spent on Robben Island. He was released in 1985. At that time he met Rosa Namises. They had two children together before separating in 1988.

Ulenga founded the Mineworkers Union of Namibia in 1986. Immediately prior to independence, he was a SWAPO member of the Constituent Assembly, which was in place from November 1989 to March 1990. After independence, he was a SWAPO member of the National Assembly from 1990 to 1996, and he was deputy Minister of Wildlife, Conservation and Tourism from 1991 to 1995 before becoming deputy Minister of Regional and Local Government and Housing in 1995. He was later appointed as Namibia's High Commissioner to the United Kingdom, but in August 1998 he resigned from that post to protest plans to amend the constitution so that president Sam Nujoma could run for a third term; in addition, he expressed dissatisfaction with Namibia's military presence in the Democratic Republic of the Congo during that country's civil war. He initially said that he would remain a member of SWAPO, but he subsequently left SWAPO and founded the opposition Congress of Democrats (CoD) in March 1999. He was the CoD candidate in the 1999 presidential election, placing second behind Nujoma and receiving 10.5% of the vote. He was also elected to the National Assembly as a CoD candidate in the 1999 parliamentary election.

At a CoD congress, Ulenga was re-elected as president of the CoD on 1 August 2004; he was also chosen as the party's candidate for the November 2004 presidential election. In this election, he placed second with 7.28% of the vote, far behind SWAPO candidate Hifikepunye Pohamba. In the concurrent 2004 parliamentary election, he was re-elected to the National Assembly.

At an extraordinary party congress held in Keetmanshoop in May 2008, Ulenga was re-elected as CoD president; he defeated Ignatius Shixwameni by 14 votes, and Shixwameni, rejecting the outcome, left the congress in protest along with about half of the delegates. Shixwameni alleged rigging and claimed that his CoD faction represented the majority of the party; his faction went to the High Court to press these claims. In July 2008, the High Court ruled in favor of the Shixwameni faction, nullifying the May 2007 congress. Ulenga accepted the decision.

In the 2009 general election, Ulenga's support dropped significantly and he received 5,812 votes (0.72%), which placed him in 9th place out of 12 candidates for president. This represented more than 50,000 fewer votes than he had received when he finished second to Pohamba in the 2004 campaign. Similarly, the CoD lost four of five members of the National Assembly. Ulenga, however, was re-elected. Things got even worse for the CoD in the 2014 Presidential and National Assembly election where the party failed to win a single seat. The defeat was followed by Ulenga’s resignation as party president in 2015. In 2017 Ulenga rejoined SWAPO, 18 years after he had left the party.
