= Action Christian National =

- Chairperson: Jan de Wet
- Founded: 1989
- Dissolved: 1991
- Ideology: White nationalism

Action Christian National (ACN) was a white nationalist political party in Namibia (formerly South West Africa). The ACN was established in 1989 to enable whites to participate in the elections. It used to be aligned with the National Party of South Africa. The ACN won three seats in the 1989 Namibian parliamentary election that elected the members of the Constituent Assembly of Namibia. The party's chairman was Jan de Wet. Factions later became part of the Monitor Action Group.

== See also ==
- List of political parties in Namibia
