= Klaus Dierks =

Namibian politician and civil engineer (1936–2005)

The Honourable Klaus Dierks

Deputy Minister of Mines and Energy
- In office 21 March 1995 – 20 March 2000
- President: Sam Nujoma

Deputy Minister of Public Works, Transport and Communications
- In office 21 March 1990 – 20 March 1995
- President: Sam Nujoma
- Preceded by: Position established

Personal details
- Born: 19 February 1936 Berlin-Dahlem, Germany
- Died: 17 March 2005 (aged 69) Windhoek, Namibia
- Party: SWAPO
- Spouse: Karen von Bremen
- Children: 4
- Occupation: Politician
- Profession: Civil engineer

Karl Otto Ludwig Klaus Dierks (19 February 1936 – 17 March 2005) was a German-born Namibian historian, transport planner, and civil engineer. He served in Namibia’s first post-independence government from 1990 to 2000 as Deputy Minister in the Ministry of Public Works, Transport and Communications and later as Deputy Minister in the Ministry of Mines and Energy.

Dierks published several studies on engineering and infrastructure development in Namibia, with a particular focus on the country's railways, roads, and telecommunications systems. Over the course of his career, he authored nearly 40 publications and was regarded as a leading authority on Namibia's transport infrastructure and historical development.

== Biography ==
Dierks was born in 1936 in Berlin-Dahlem, Germany. He received his early education in Zeuthen/Mark, Schulpforta, Eichwalde and Berlin-Schöneberg. He studied civil engineering and history at Technische Universität Berlin and earned a diploma in Engineering in 1965 and doctorates in 1965 and 1992. He obtained a humanistic degree in history in 1962 and later completed a doctorate in civil engineering (Dr.-Ing., summa cum laude) in 1992. Immediately after receiving his diploma, Dierks became an engineer in South Africa before moving to South West Africa (now Namibia). He worked for more than 30 years as a roads engineer in the Namibian Department of Transport, gaining extensive knowledge of the country's transport network and geography. During this time, he conducted field research on the development of a road system for an independent Namibia.

In 1982 Dierks became a member of resistance movement SWAPO rising to be a member of its Central Committee. He argued for the "Development of the infrastructure regarding the road system in an independent SWA/ Namibia" in 1979 when both the topic of independence and the name "Namibia" were considered revolutionary. In the 1980s he was forced to resign after 22 years of service, and he then set up his own consultative business. He founded the consulting engineering firm Namibia Consult Incorporated, which focused on developing “Namibia appropriate technologies” aimed at addressing local development needs. It was at this time that Dierks started to write about Namibian history, "pursuing an academic war against the apartheid regime" by outlining the cultural and economic development of the area before the encroachment of European settlers and missionaries, a fact contested by the colonial regime.

At Namibian independence in 1990 he became Deputy Minister, first with the Works, Transport and Communication portfolio and later in the Ministry of Mines and Energy. He was a member of the National Assembly of Namibia from independence until 2000, when he retired from politics. He was known for his love of history, mountaineering and photography.

=== Positions ===
- 1990-1995 Deputy Minister in the Namibian Ministry of Public Works, Transport and Communications
- 1995-2000 Deputy Minister in the Namibian Ministry of Mines and Energy

Later he served with the Namibian Electricity Control Board energy regulator and he managed to turn around TransNamib (the Namibian railway company) from loss to profit in three years. From 2000, he served as Chairman of the Namibian Electricity Control Board (ECB), and in 2002 he was appointed to the Board of TransNamib, where he was elected chairman. Under his leadership, TransNamib was transformed from a loss-making entity into a profitable company by 2003. He also served as Director of the Namibia Road Fund Administration from 2003 and chaired the Research Committee for the History of the Anticolonial Resistance and Liberation Struggle.

== Publications ==
Dierks wrote a number of scientific publications including his doctorate on the development of an improved road system in Namibia and publications on history and the settlement of ǁKhauxaǃnas in the Great Karas Mountains. He also wrote a number of publications in the field of transport and telecommunications and the book Chronology of Namibian History: From Pre-historical Times to Independent Namibia. His research also included archaeological work, notably the documentation and study of the ancient settlement of ǁKhauxaǃnas, one of Namibia’s earliest known fortified sites.

== Family ==
Klaus Dierks lived up until his death with his wife Karen von Bremen and his four children in Windhoek. The couple, married in 1962, had four children and several grandchildren.
