= Meat Corporation of Namibia =

Namibian meat processing company

MeatCo Namibia
- Formerly: Swameat Corporation (1985-2001)
- Type: Limited
- Industry: Food
- Founded: 1986
- Headquarters: Windhoek, Namibia
- Key people: Mushokabanji Mwilima (CEO), Johnnie Hamman (Chairperson)
- Products: Beef
- Number of employees: 743 (2018)
- Website: www.meatco.com.na

Meat Corporation of Namibia, locally known as MeatCo, is a meat processing company headquartered in Windhoek, the capital of Namibia. It is the largest exporter of prime beef in Namibia.

== History ==
The Swameat Corporation was established in 1986 as a state organization in charge of meat production and exports in Namibia. In 2001, it changed its name to Meat Corporation of Namibia (Meatco).

In 2003, following an EU ban on Namibian meat imports, Meatco had to return 17 containers of fresh meat to Africa. In 2008, Meatco started exports to Switzerland and Dubai.

According to The Namibian, the government announced in June 2012 that the ownership of Meatco will be vested in a cooperative with a majority shareholding of 70 percent, and the government will own the remaining 30 percent.

In 2017, Meatco sent its first beef consignment to China. In 2018, the company's losses dropped from N$51 million to N$18 million.

In January 2020, Mwilima Mushokabanji, previously executive director of the Namibia National Farmers Union, was named the new CEO of the company. The following month, Meatco became the first exporter of African beef to the USA and resumed audits with the European Union in an attempt to export to Europe, but also reached out to Botswana to import additional herds, after a severe drought in the country. The company took the management of the Katima Mulilo abattoir from its private competitor Zambezi Meat Corporation (Zamco).

On 6 May 2020, Johnnie Hamman, well known businessman and legal expert, was named the new Chairperson of the company.

== Description ==
Meatco mainly produces frozen, vacuum-packed beef cuts for export. In addition, ready-to-eat meat and corned beef produced. All organic products come from free-range Namibian cattle.

Meatco's biggest clients currently are South Africa, the United Kingdom and Norway, although it has penetrated various other markets including Germany, Switzerland, Italy, the Czech Republic, China and Dubai. The company has facilities in Windhoek, Okapuka, Johannesburg, London, Oshakati, Katima Mulilo, Otjiwarongo, Grootfontein, Okahandja among others. Its abattoirs are HACCP and ISO 9001 accredited and have South African export status.

Meatco owns 33.3% of GPS Norway AS.
