= Philemon Moongo =

Namibian politician

Philemon Moongo (April 11, 1943 – March 10, 2015) was a Namibian politician. A member of the Democratic Turnhalle Alliance, Moongo has been a member of the National Assembly since 1995. Moongo was born at Oniipa village in Oshikoto Region in 1943 and died from cancer after a long battle in 2015.

== Career ==
Moongo was an ardent supporter of the South West Africa People's Organization (SWAPO) and fled into exile with in the mid-1970s. In exile, he eventually became a platoon commander in the People's Liberation Army of Namibia (PLAN), the armed wing of SWAPO. However, he was arrested and detained for SWAPO from 1976 to 1978 in first Zambia then Tanzania for taking part in protests regarding poor living conditions of exiles and organizational corruption. Following his release in 1978, Moongo moved to Sweden for a short time before returning to Namibia and organizing support for a new political party, SWAPO Democrats. SWAPO Democrats joined the Multi-Party Conference, which sought to come to a settlement over Namibian independence with SWAPO's involvement, in 1983. From 1985 to 1989, Moongo was a SWAPO Democrats delegate to the Transitional Government of National Unity assembly. However, SWAPO Democrats received just 3,000 votes in the 1989 constituent assembly election prior to independence and the party became defunct soon after. Moongo joined the leading opposition party following independence, the Democratic Turnhalle Alliance, in 1990 and soon became regional chairperson for much of northern and central Namibia. In 1994, Moongo was put on the voter list for the DTA and was elected to the National Assembly, where he has been a member until his death in 2015.

== See also ==
- Andreas Shipanga
