= Michaela Hübschle =

Namibian politician

Deputy Minister for Prisons and Correctional Services
- In office 1995–2000
- Succeeded by: Jeremia Nambinga

Personal details
- Born: Michaela Kuntze; 21 September 1950 (age 75) Otjiwarongo, Namibia
- Party: SWAPO (until 2009 and returned 2017); Rally for Democracy and Progress (Namibia) (RDP) (2009-2017)
- Occupation: Politician

Michaela Hübschle (born 21 September 1950 as Michaela Kuntze in Otjiwarongo) is a Namibian politician and former Deputy Minister for Prisons and Correctional Services.

== Education and profession ==
After attending school in her hometown, Hübschle studied at the University of Pretoria in South Africa from 1970 to 1973. She graduated with a BA. She then worked as a translator for the German embassy in Pretoria until 1976. Hübschle then travelled to the Federal Republic of Germany and was active in the local environmental movement. In 1984, she returned to the South West Africa at that time and worked on various projects in Katutura, a township in Windhoek.

Since 2000, Hübschle has been the chairman of the Criminals Return Into Society (CRIS), founded by her, which has been called Change since August 2009. The association is committed to start-up and life support for former prisoners and in the area of vocational support. It also organizes the Gildehaus, an informal forum for leading personalities from government and politics.

== Political career ==
Hübschle was a member of the Constituent Assembly of Namibia and from 1990 to 2000 for the SWAPO deputies of the National Assembly. In 1995, Hübschle was appointed Deputy Minister for Prisons and Correctional Services. She held this office until 2000. During her term, she applied the AIDS prevention program for free condoms for prisoners of conscience. This view, however, did not prevail in the government, as it was seen as supporting homosexuality.

For the parliamentary elections in 2000, Hübschle was not recruited as a candidate after criticizing the abuse of prisoners in the context of the Caprivi conflict the previous year. In addition, she had called for the SWAPO leadership to apologize for the abuse of prisoners during the liberation struggle.

In a 2007 article co-authored with the SWAPO politician Shapua Kaukungua, Hübschle accused the party leadership of a defective party-internal democracy and interventions in regional and local elections. In the parliamentary elections in 2009, Hübschle broke with SWAPO and ran for the oppositing Rally for Democracy and Progress (Namibia) (RDP), whose central committee she is a member of. However, she did not succeed in entering parliament.

== Personal life ==
Hübschle's parents were the German-Namibian farmer Eberhard Kuntze and the author Lisa Kuntze. Hübschle was married to the former head of the Namibian veterinary authority, Dr. Otto Hübschle, who died in 2008 at the age of 62. They had two children.
