= Hamutenya Ndadi =

- Born: Jason Hamutenya Ndadi; 1926; Ouhongo, South West Africa
- Died: 1977 (aged 50–51); Angola
- Resting place: Hainyeko Training Center Cemetery, Lubango, Angola (1977–2005); Ouhongo (2005–present)
- Other names: Wanehepo
- Occupation: Freedom fighter
- Organization: Ovamboland People's Organization

Jason Hamutenya Ndadi (born 1926 in Ouhongo, South West Africa, today Namibia, died 1977 in Angola), also known as Wanehepo, was a Namibian liberation fighter and co-founder of the Ovamboland People's Organization (OPO), the predecessor organization of SWAPO.

Hamutenya died in a traffic accident and was initially buried in the Hainyeko Training Center Cemetery near Lubango in Angola. The body was relocated to his home town of Ouhongo on 6 May 2005.

A street in Windhoek's Olympia suburb was renamed after Ndadi in 2007.

== Literature and movies ==
- Ndadi, Tshoombe. Wanehepo: a Biography of Late Comrade Jason Hamutenya Ndadi (Wanehepo) 1926-1977. Brighton Polytechnic, 1985.
- Wanehepo: The Return of a Namibian Hero. Namibia 2006, 57 minutes.
