= 1994 Namibian general election =

- 4–5 December 1994
- Presidential election
- Turnout: 76.05%
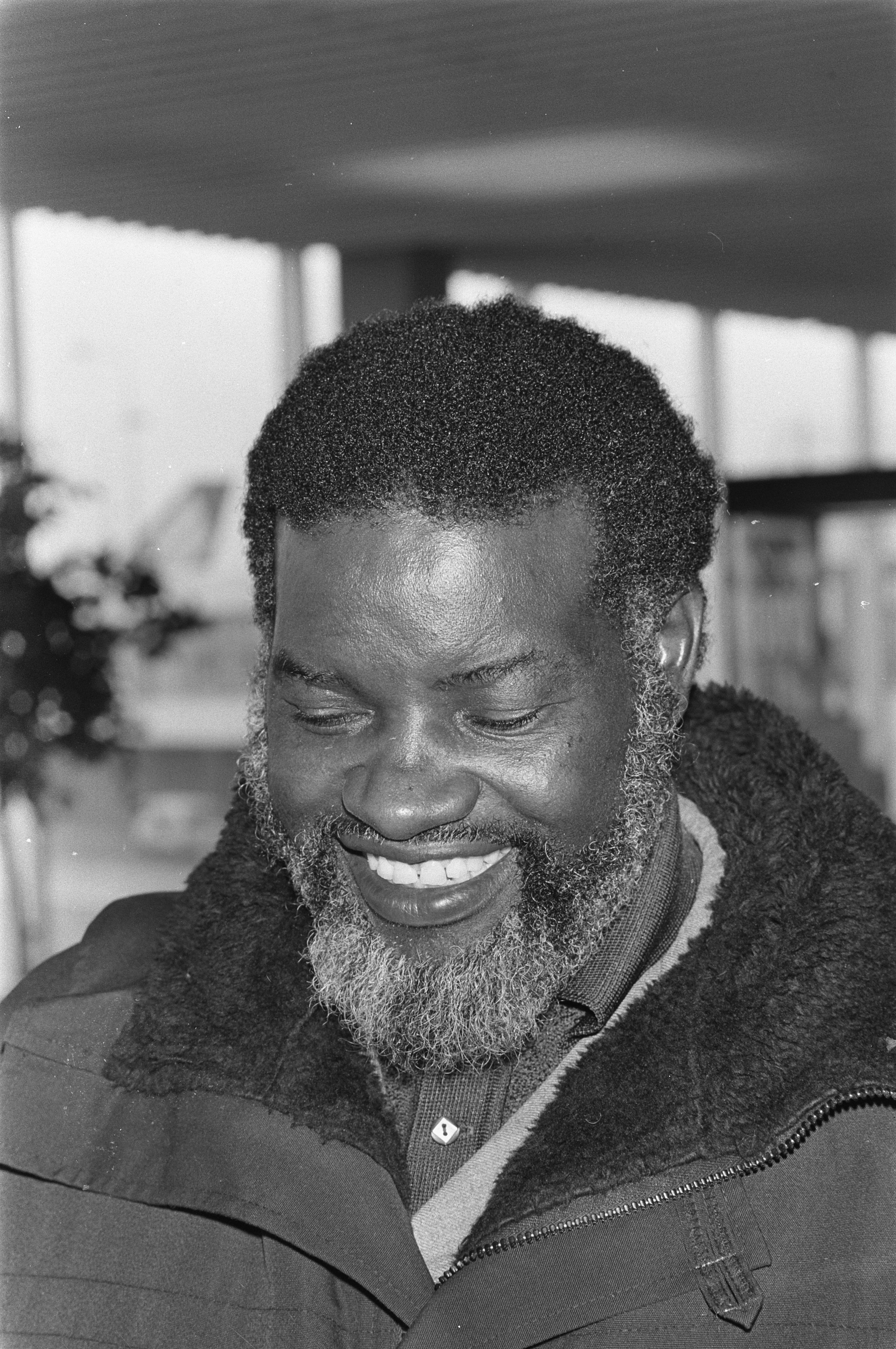

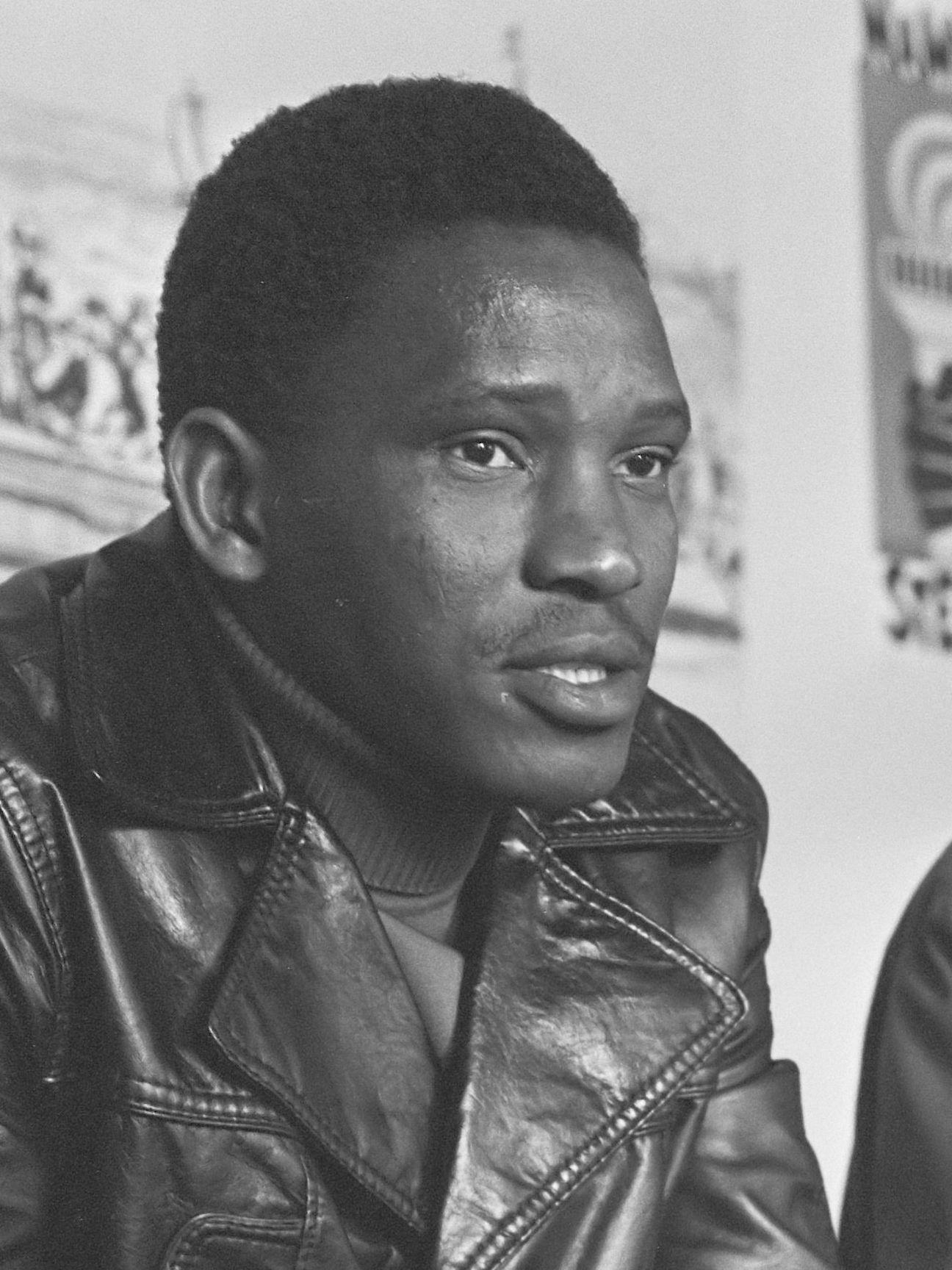
Nominee	Sam Nujoma	Mishake Muyongo
Party	SWAPO	DTA
Popular vote	370,452	114,843
Percentage	76.34%	23.66%
- Results by region
President before election
Sam Nujoma
SWAPO
Elected President
Sam Nujoma
SWAPO

General elections were held in Namibia on 4 and 5 December 1994. Each registered voter could poll two votes, one for president (the first time a president was to be directly elected) and one for the National Assembly. Both elections were won by SWAPO, which won 53 of the 72 seats in the National Assembly, and whose candidate, Sam Nujoma, won the presidential election by more than three-fourth of the polled votes.

The elections were the first since Namibia's independence from South Africa.

== Results ==
=== President ===
Candidate	Party	Votes	%
Sam Nujoma	SWAPO	370,452	76.34
Mishake Muyongo	Democratic Turnhalle Alliance	114,843	23.66
Total		485,295	100.00
Valid votes		485,295	97.55
Invalid/blank votes		12,213	2.45
Total votes		497,508	100.00
Registered voters/turnout		654,189	76.05
Source: ECN

=== National Assembly ===
Party	Votes	%	Seats	+/–
SWAPO	361,800	73.89	53	+12
Democratic Turnhalle Alliance	101,748	20.78	15	–6
United Democratic Front	13,309	2.72	2	–2
Democratic Coalition of Namibia	4,058	0.83	1	0
Monitor Action Group	4,005	0.82	1	New
SWANU	2,598	0.53	0	New
Federal Convention of Namibia	1,166	0.24	0	–1
Workers Revolutionary Party	952	0.19	0	New
Appointed members			6	0
Total	489,636	100.00	78	0
Valid votes	489,636	98.42		
Invalid/blank votes	7,863	1.58		
Total votes	497,499	100.00		
Registered voters/turnout	654,189	76.05		
Source: ECN

=== By region ===
Region	DCN	DTA	FCN	MAG	SWANU	SWAPO	UDF	WRP
Caprivi	125	11,868	44	25	37	11,765	183	30
Erongo	297	8,138	75	546	268	18,955	3,200	41
Hardap	206	9,613	255	465	122	7,385	325	68
ǁKaras	191	8,630	157	530	178	12,362	421	60
Kavango	98	3,570	37	23	82	19,884	162	74
Khomas	935	19,609	192	793	555	33,269	2,124	169
Kunene	635	6,883	62	267	69	5,840	3,484	34
Ohangwena	53	285	32	11	106	58,797	145	86
Omaheke	328	10,562	69	432	435	6,054	194	35
Omusati	31	179	15	12	139	70,564	189	86
Oshana	146	1,509	28	14	116	50,722	171	57
Oshikoto	80	2,412	38	128	160	43,275	591	92
Otjozondjupa	825	15,870	130	657	240	15,137	1,839	92
Source: The Namibian
