= Döbra, Namibia =

Coordinates: 22°20′S 17°06′E

Döbra is a settlement in Namibia, about 25 kilometres (16 mi) north of the capital Windhoek.

There is also a mountain with the same name which is 2023m above sea level. It is located near the Kürsteneck in the Eros Mountains and around 6 kilometres (3.7 mi) west of Otjihase mine.

Döbra houses a mission station of the Catholic Church in Namibia, part of the Archdiocese of Windhoek. The mission station ran a teacher training centre, St Joseph's Teacher Training Centre since 1924, and a school, St Joseph's Roman Catholic High School. The high school is still active today.

The teacher training centre at Döbra was one of very few institutions in the territory of South-West Africa that offered tertiary education to the indigenous population. It graduated many students that after Namibian independence became high-profile people in society. It also developed into a centre of resistance. The Namibia National Students Organisation (NANSO) was founded here on 2 June 1984, and the 1988 student protests in Namibia started with a march from Döbra to the capital.
