= Eric Biwa =

Namibian politician (born 1953)

Personal details
- Born: 8 May 1953 (age 72) Vaalgras, ǁKaras Region
- Party: Patriotic Unity Movement (PUM)

Eric Biwa (born 8 May 1953 in Vaalgras, ǁKaras Region) is a former Namibian politician with the Patriotic Unity Movement (PUM), a party which was a member of the United Democratic Front (UDF).

== Pre-independence ==
A former combatant in the Namibian War of Independence with SWAPO's armed wing, Biwa was one of many alleged spies detained near Lubango, Angola in the 1980s. Biwa founded the PUM in July 1989 ahead of the 1989 elections and immediately led the party into the UDF alliance. Biwa was a member of the National Assembly of Namibia from its founding as the Constituent Assembly prior to independence in 1989 until his resignation in 2003. He was replaced by Gustaphine Tjombe.
