= 1999 Namibian general election =

- 30 November–1 December 1999
- Presidential election
- Turnout: 62.06%
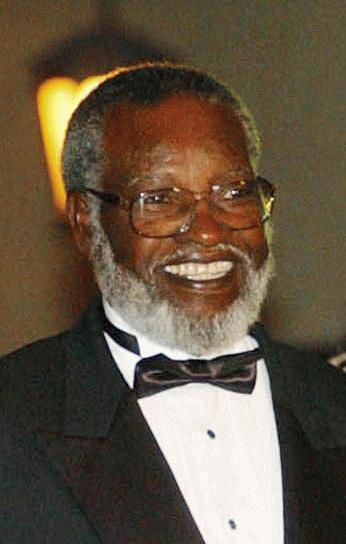

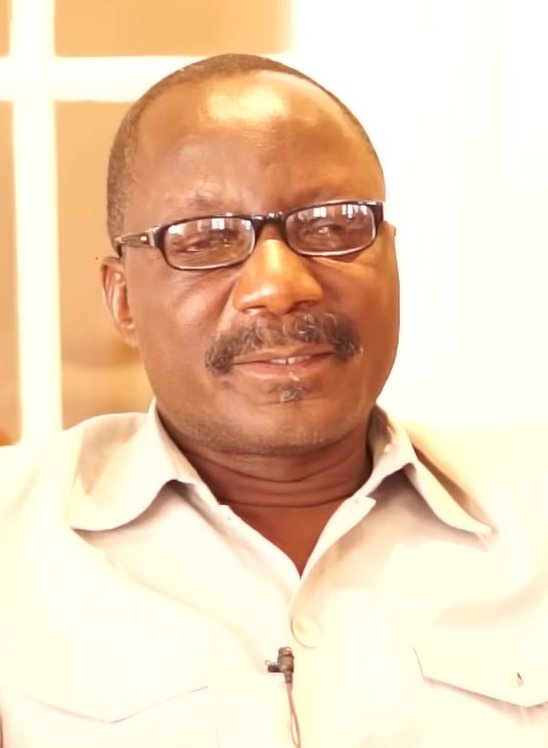
| | | | DTA |
| Nominee | Sam Nujoma | Ben Ulenga | Katuutire Kaura |
| Party | SWAPO | COD | DTA |
| Popular vote | 414,096 | 56,541 | 50,824 |
| Percentage | 76.85% | 10.49% | 9.64% |
- Results by region
President before election
Sam Nujoma
SWAPO
Elected President
Sam Nujoma
SWAPO

General elections were held in Namibia on 30 November and 1 December 1999 to elect a president and the National Assembly. Voting took place over two days, after the Commission was persuaded by protests from political parties that a single polling day would be insufficient to accommodate travel to polling stations by voters in remote areas.

Incumbent president Sam Nujoma of SWAPO was re-elected with over 76% of the vote, whilst SWAPO won 55 of the 72 elected seats in the National Assembly.

== Electoral system ==
The President was elected using a modified two-round system, with a candidate required to receive at least 50% of the vote in the first round to be elected; if no candidate had crossed the 50% threshold, subsequent rounds would be held until a candidate achieved a majority. The Namibian constitution was amended to allow the first president to hold office for three terms, as Nujoma had started his first term after being nominated by members of the Constituent Assembly rather than being directly elected.

The National Assembly consisted of 72 members elected by proportional representation and six members appointed by the President.

== Conduct ==
Following supplementary voter registration in August and September 1999, the electorate rose from 738,000 to 878,000 due to names being entered improperly, incorrect addresses, names entered multiple times, and officials registering people beyond the 8 October deadline. The former Director of Elections maintained that the actual number of legitimate voters was approximately 790,000. To combat voter fraud, voters would sign or mark their cards to prevent them from voting twice, they would also have their thumb marked with indelible ink.

The Congress of Democrats (COD) felt that distribution of public funds to political parties was unfair, as the money was only available for political parties represented in parliament. Based on representation SWAPO received N$5.8 million, the Democratic Turnhalle Alliance (DTA) N$1.8 million, the United Democratic Front N$225,000, the Monitor Action Group N$75,316 and the Democratic Coalition of Namibia N$69,355.

=== Violence ===
Despite all parties signing and agreeing to an electoral code of conduct at the beginning of the campaign, there was violence between SWAPO and COD supporters. It began when a SWAPO supporter assaulted a young woman who was working in a pub in Ondangwa. Another COD supporter was beaten up after a classroom debate. The DTA claimed that police were harassing their followers with detention orders and house searches. The Home Affairs minister said DTA politicians should be "locked up" if they tried to obtain police assistance in organising their meetings. On 4 November a COD regional manager was travelling and was surrounded by schoolchildren and SWAPO co-ordinator Mandate Pohamba. The children were chanting "down with the mercenaries and spies", and attempted to remove party logo from the vehicle. This activity escalated to a COD organiser being assaulted with a brick by schoolchildren and later receiving death threats.

Ignatius Shixwameni, then a SWAPO politician, claimed he heard SWAPO supporters in the Kavango Region singing songs about how he and Ben Ulenga (the COD presidential candidate) would be arrested and have their heads chopped off. He also said he had been told by trainee teachers in the area that they were told not to join the COD if they wanted jobs. Schoolchildren had been threatened they would lose scholarships if they or their parents joined the COD. Many more incidents similar to those mentioned were reported. The National Society for Human Rights released a report detailing the events. The Electoral Commission conducted a Liaison Committee on 9 November, in which it was agreed upon by the parties that whenever possible they would hold their rallies at the same times and at least 500 meters apart.

== Results ==
=== President ===
| Candidate | Party | Votes | % |
|---|---|---|---|
| Sam Nujoma | SWAPO | 414,096 | 76.85 |
| Ben Ulenga | Congress of Democrats | 56,541 | 10.49 |
| Katuutire Kaura | Democratic Turnhalle Alliance | 51,939 | 9.64 |
| Justus ǁGaroëb | United Democratic Front | 16,272 | 3.02 |
| Total | | 538,848 | 100.00 |
| Valid votes | | 538,848 | 98.79 |
| Invalid/blank votes | | 6,617 | 1.21 |
| Total votes | | 545,465 | 100.00 |
| Registered voters/turnout | | 878,869 | 62.06 |
Source: Government of Namibia

=== National Assembly ===
| Party | Votes | % | Seats | +/– |
|---|---|---|---|---|
| SWAPO | 408,174 | 76.15 | 55 | +2 |
| Congress of Democrats | 53,289 | 9.94 | 7 | New |
| Democratic Turnhalle Alliance | 50,824 | 9.48 | 7 | –8 |
| United Democratic Front | 15,685 | 2.93 | 2 | 0 |
| Monitor Action Group | 3,618 | 0.67 | 1 | 0 |
| SWANU–WRP | 1,885 | 0.35 | 0 | 0 |
| Democratic Coalition of Namibia | 1,797 | 0.34 | 0 | –1 |
| Federal Convention of Namibia | 764 | 0.14 | 0 | 0 |
| Appointed members | | | 6 | 0 |
| Total | 536,036 | 100.00 | 78 | 0 |
| Valid votes | 536,036 | 99.06 | | |
| Invalid/blank votes | 5,078 | 0.94 | | |
| Total votes | 541,114 | 100.00 | | |
| Registered voters/turnout | 878,869 | 61.57 | | |
Source: Government of Namibia

==== By region ====
| Region | COD | DCN | DTA | FCN | MAG | SWANU–WRP | SWAPO | UDF |
|---|---|---|---|---|---|---|---|---|
| Caprivi | 6,368 | 71 | 943 | 18 | 17 | 28 | 9,754 | 174 |
| Erongo | 5,590 | 130 | 3,372 | 27 | 465 | 101 | 24,065 | 4,097 |
| Hardap | 4,854 | 111 | 3,943 | 78 | 453 | 72 | 6,318 | 353 |
| ǁKaras | 4,866 | 94 | 2,939 | 106 | 405 | 29 | 13,124 | 299 |
| Kavango | 4,838 | 135 | 7,179 | 100 | 83 | 221 | 33,970 | 679 |
| Khomas | 14,530 | 339 | 5,657 | 162 | 846 | 302 | 44,925 | 2,288 |
| Kunene | 1,528 | 113 | 6,911 | 38 | 192 | 44 | 4,368 | 3,435 |
| Ohangwena | 308 | 27 | 152 | 9 | 18 | 181 | 68,593 | 243 |
| Omaheke | 1,967 | 197 | 7,619 | 81 | 399 | 254 | 6,402 | 300 |
| Omusati | 374 | 42 | 611 | 25 | 35 | 210 | 80,601 | 277 |
| Oshana | 1,313 | 20 | 727 | 16 | 17 | 128 | 52,246 | 234 |
| Oshikoto | 2,161 | 47 | 921 | 18 | 79 | 154 | 47,584 | 698 |
| Otjozondjupa | 4,455 | 467 | 9,843 | 86 | 606 | 159 | 15,988 | 2,605 |
Source: The Namibian
