= Moses ǁGaroëb =

Namibian politician

Minister of Labour and Human Resources
- In office 1995–1997
- Prime Minister: Hage Geingob

Personal details
- Born: 14 April 1942 Arixas near Mariental, South West Africa (now Namibia)
- Died: 19 August 1997 (aged 55) Windhoek, Namibia
- Party: SWAPO
- Spouse: Carol ǁGaroës
- Children: Jonah ǁGaroëb David ǁGaroëb Tute ǁGaroëb Shimmy ǁGaroëb
- Education: University of Rochester

Moses Mague ǁGaroëb (14 April 1942, in Arixas near Mariental – 19 August 1997, in Windhoek) was a Namibian politician, founding member of SWAPO, and member of SWAPO's Politburo and Central Committee. During his political career, ǁGaroëb served in the Constituent Assembly of Namibia and was a Member of Parliament from the day of Namibian independence, 21 March 1990. He was appointed Minister of Labour and Human Resources in 1995, a position he held until his death.

== Career ==
ǁGaroëb was born in April 1942 at |Arixas near Mariental as the son of Samuel Geingob and Rebecca Geingos. At the age of 17, he took an active part in the demonstrations against the forced removal from Windhoek's Old Location to Katutura, and witnessed the massacre of 12 December 1959. He went into exile in 1961 as a member of SWANU, and joined SWAPO in the same year. He went to study in the United States and appeared before the United Nations in the early 1960s.

After graduating with a BA in political science from the University of Rochester in New York, he returned from the U.S. to Africa in 1966. In Tanzania, he became a broadcaster with The Namibian Hour from Radio Tanzania, and then editor of SWAPO's newsletter Namibia Today and Director of Information. At the SWAPO Consultative Congress in Tanga, 1969, he was appointed a member of the Central Committee and executive committee (later Political Bureau), positions which he held until his death, and SWAPO Administrative Secretary (until 1989). He was elected into the Constituent Assembly in 1989, continued as a member of the first National Assembly of Namibia, and was re-elected in 1994. From 1990 to 1995, he served as SWAPO Secretary-General. From 1995 until his death he was Minister of Labour and Human Resources.

== Death and legacy ==
Moses ǁGaroëb was a SWAPO loyalist. Not having a tribal power-base, his popularity within SWAPO was based on his outspokenness and his accessibility as an Administrative Secretary, while outside SWAPO, his often uncompromising and hard-hitting statements made him many enemies. ǁGaroëb was married to Carol ǁGaroës. They had four children.

ǁGaroëb last years were overshadowed by progressing ill-health (diabetes). He died on 19 August 1997 in Windhoek and was one of the first leaders of the independent Republic of Namibia who received a state funeral at the Old Location Cemetery on 27 September 1997. Founding president Sam Nujoma, Hage Geingob and Theo-Ben Gurirab all attended his tombstone unveiling ceremony. On 26 August 2015, Namibia's Heroes' Day, ǁGaroëb was reburied at Namibia's National Heroes' Acre.

Moses ǁGaroëb Constituency in Windhoek is named after him, as well as a street in Swakopmund and a primary school in Hakahana, Katutura.
