= Hendrik Witbooi (politician) =

Namibian politician (1934–2009)

The Honorable Hendrik Witbooi

Deputy-Prime Minister of Namibia
- In office March 1990 – March 2005
- President: Sam Nujoma
- Preceded by: Position Established
- Succeeded by: Libertina Amathila

Minister of Labour and Manpower Development
- In office 21 March 1990 – 1995
- President: Sam Nujoma
- Preceded by: Position Established

Personal details
- Born: January 7, 1934 Gibeon, Hardap Region
- Died: October 13, 2009 (aged 75) Windhoek
- Party: SWAPO
- Occupation: Politician

Kaptein Hendrik Witbooi (traditional name ǃNanseb ǀGabemab; 7 January 1934 – 13 October 2009) was a Namibian politician and the seventh Captain of the ǀKhowesin clan. A member of SWAPO from 1976 until his death, Witbooi brought with him several clans of Nama into the liberation organisation.

== Biography ==
Imprisoned numerous times during the Namibian War of Independence, Witbooi was first elected as Vice-President of SWAPO in 1984 and was re-elected for the last time in 1997. A member of the Constituent Assembly in 1989–90, Witbooi served in the National Assembly until his 2004 retirement, including a stint (1990-1995) as Minister of Labour and Manpower Development.

Witbooi became Namibia's first Deputy-Prime Minister of Namibia in 1990. He served in that position until 2005.

In October 2009 Witbooi was facing major medical problems and had slipped into a coma at the Roman Catholic Hospital in Windhoek. He died on 13 October due to cancer.

Witbooi was the great-grandson of Hendrik Witbooi, the early resistance leader who led his chiefly followers against European colonisation.
