= Theo-Ben Gurirab =

2nd Prime Minister of Namibia

The Honorable Theo-Ben Gurirab
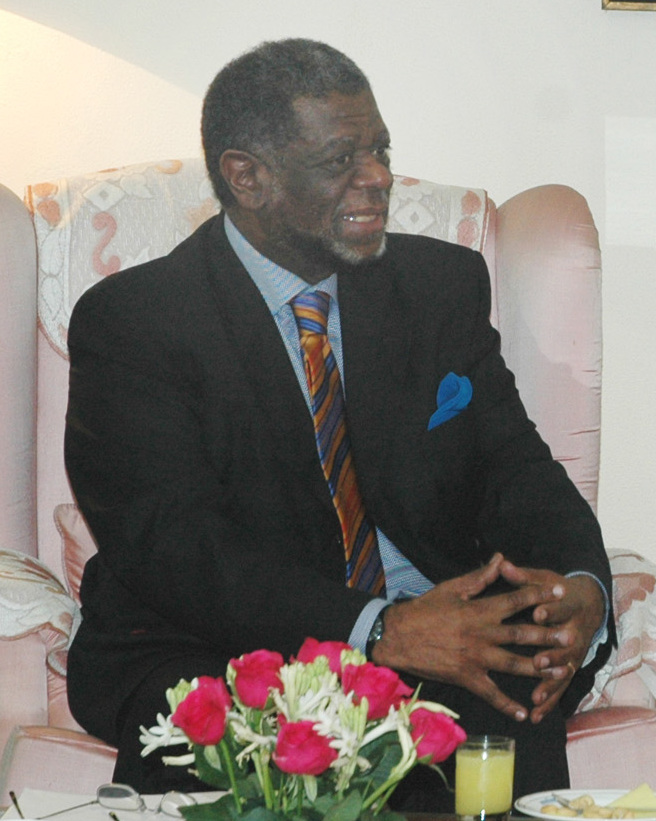
- Gurirab in 2006

Speaker of the National Assembly
- In office 21 March 2005 – 21 March 2015
- President: Hifikepunye Pohamba
- Preceded by: Mose Penaani Tjitendero
- Succeeded by: Peter Katjavivi

2nd Prime Minister of Namibia
- In office 28 August 2002 – 20 March 2005
- President: Sam Nujoma
- Deputy: Hendrik Witbooi
- Preceded by: Hage Geingob
- Succeeded by: Nahas Angula

President of the United Nations General Assembly
- In office 14 September 1999 – 5 September 2000
- Preceded by: Didier Opertti
- Succeeded by: Harri Holkeri

Minister of Foreign Affairs
- In office 21 March 1990 – 26 August 2002
- President: Sam Nujoma
- Preceded by: Position established
- Succeeded by: Hidipo Hamutenya

Personal details
- Born: 23 January 1938 Usakos, South West Africa
- Died: 14 July 2018 (aged 80) Windhoek, Namibia
- Party: SWAPO
- Spouse: Joan Gurirab
- Children: 2
- Occupation: Politician
- Profession: Teacher

Theo-Ben Gurirab (23 January 1938 – 14 July 2018) was a Namibian politician who served in various senior government positions. He served as the second prime minister of Namibia from 28 August 2002 to 20 March 2005, following the demotion and subsequent resignation of Hage Geingob. Previously he was the country's first Minister of Foreign Affairs from 1990 to 2002 and was President of the United Nations General Assembly from 1999 to 2000. He was Speaker of the National Assembly of Namibia from 2005 to 2015, when he was replaced by Peter Katjavivi. Gurirab ultimately resigned from politics in 2015.

== Early life and education ==
Gurirab was born on 23 January 1938 in Usakos in the Erongo Region. In 1960 he obtained a teaching diploma from the Augustineum Training College in Okahandja, and in 1964 while in exile in the United States, he graduated with a degree in political science from Temple University in Pennsylvania.

== Political career ==
Gurirab was in exile from 1962 to 1989. He fled first to Tanganyika, where he won a United Nations study fellowship and relocated to the United States. He was Associate Representative of the SWAPO Mission to the United Nations and the United States from 1964 to 1972, then Head of the SWAPO Mission to the United Nations from 1972 to 1986. Subsequently, he was SWAPO's Secretary for Foreign Affairs from 1986 to 1990.

He was a SWAPO member of the Constituent Assembly which was in place from November 1989 to March 1990, immediately before independence, and the "key drafter" of Namibia's Constitution. From 1990 to 2015 he was a member of the National Assembly, and he also served on the Central Committee and Politburo of SWAPO. He was Minister of Foreign Affairs from independence in 1990 until he was appointed as prime minister by President Sam Nujoma on 27 August 2002, replacing Hage Geingob.

While serving as Foreign Minister, he was elected as the president of the United Nations General Assembly on 14 September 1999, serving in that position until September 2000. Among Gurirab's achievements at the UN was chairing the negotiations that brought about the reintegration of Walvis Bay into Namibian territory, in fulfillment of Security Council resolution 432.

Following the 2004 election, Gurirab was elected as Speaker of the National Assembly at the beginning of the new parliamentary term on 20 March 2005.

He received the sixth highest number of votes—377—in the election to the Central Committee of SWAPO at the party's August 2002 congress. He was again one of the highest-scoring candidates in the election to the Central Committee at SWAPO's November 2007 congress.

From 2008 to 2011, Gurirab was the president of the Inter-Parliamentary Union (IPU), an international organization of parliaments of sovereign states.

Gurirab was re-elected to the National Assembly in the November 2009 parliamentary election, in which SWAPO retained a large majority of seats. When the MPs took their seats for the new parliamentary term on 19 March 2010, they unanimously re-elected Gurirab to his post as Speaker of the National Assembly. Speaking on that occasion, Guiriab stressed the importance of the Constitution: "As one of its authors, and among the longest-serving public officials, and founders of our Republic, I know of the highest vision the Constitution provides for Namibia, as well as the promise of national unity, reconciliation, democracy, the rule of law, human dignity, socio-economic emancipation and the commitment to protect the gains of our long and bitter struggle for liberation and independence."

In late August 2014, when SWAPO chose its list of parliamentary candidates for the November 2014 general election, Gurirab was not on the list. When the National Assembly began meeting for its new term on 20 March 2015, Gurirab was succeeded as Speaker by Peter Katjavivi.

== Death ==
Gurirab died at a Windhoek hospital on 14 July 2018 of natural causes. He is buried at Heroes' Acre.

== Awards ==
- 1999: Doctorate of Law honoris causa, University of Namibia
- Order of the Sun First Class
- since 2002: member of the International Raoul Wallenberg Foundation
- 2000: Honorary Professorship of Foreign Affairs, China Foreign Affairs University, Beijing. Gurirab was only the third foreigner to be bestowed with this title.
- 2000: Founding member of the Olympic Truce Foundation in Athens
- 2011: Honorary President of the IPU

Positions in intergovernmental organisations
Preceded by Didier Opertti Badan	President of the United Nations General Assembly; 1999–2000	Succeeded by Harri Holkeri
Government offices
Preceded by Hage Geingob	Prime Minister of Namibia; 2002–2005	Succeeded by Nahas Angula
