= Mose Tjitendero =

Namibian politician (1943–2006)

Mose Penaani Tjitendero (25 December 1943 – 26 April 2006) was a Namibian politician and educator. He was Namibia's first Speaker of the National Assembly from independence on March 21, 1990, until his retirement in 2004.

== Early life and exile ==
Tjitendero was an ethnic Herero who was born in Okahandja on 25 December 1943. He attended Augustineum Secondary School there but did not graduate. Instead he went into exile to Tanzania where he finished school at the Kurisini International School in Dar es Salaam. Afterwards he went to the United States and studied first at Lincoln University, where he graduated in 1972 with a B.A. in History and Political Science, and then at University of Massachusetts Amherst where he obtained a master's degree in history, and in 1977 a PhD.

Tjitendero returned from the United States in 1976 and worked as a lecturer in Curriculum Development and Development Studies at the United Nations Institute for Namibia (UNIN) in Lusaka, Zambia. He also contributed to Voice of Namibia radio programmes during this time. In 1982 he was promoted to head the Teacher Training and Upgrading Division at the same institution, a position he held until 1989. In the wake of Namibian independence he moved to Angola, heading a vocational training centre.

== Political career ==
Tjitendero joined SWAPO at a young age and was an activist already in the early 1960s. In 1981 he became a member of the party's central committee. He was speaker of the National Assembly of Namibia from 1990, until his retirement in 2004. Theo-Ben Gurirab succeeded him.

Tjitendero died on 26 April 2006 in Windhoek. He was declared a National Hero of Namibia and buried at Namibia's Heroes' Acre outside the capital. He married Sandra, a fellow Namibian in exile.
