= Nathaniel Maxuilili =

Namibian politician

Nathaniel Maxuilili (10 October 1927 – 26 June 1999) was a Namibian politician, a member of SWAPO, and veteran of the struggle for the independence of the former South West Africa, he fought alongside today's Namibian prominent political figures such as Hifikepunye Pohamba and Andimba Toivo Ya Toivo among others. He was a deputy cabinet Minister of the Namibian government in the 1990s.

Maxuilili was killed on 23 June 1999 in Walvis Bay, while the ambulance taking him to hospital due to heart problems, was struck head-on by another vehicle.
