= Orders, decorations, and medals of Namibia =

The Republic of Namibia has an honours system comprising orders, medals, military decorations, and police decorations. Legislation also provides for the establishment of decorations and medals for the intelligence service, the prisons service, and the fire services.

These honours and awards superseded those used by the then territory of South West Africa before independence in 1990.

== Orders ==
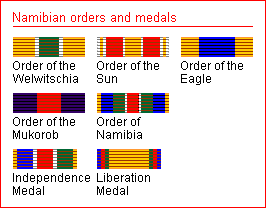

The following orders are conferred by the President of Namibia:

- Most Ancient Order of the Welwitschia mirabilis (1995- ) — for the President and other heads of state.
- Most Brilliant Order of the Sun (1995 -) — for meritorious service.
- Most Excellent Order of the Eagle (1995 -) — for diplomatic services.
- Order of the Mukorob (1995 -) — for meritorious military service.
- Most Distinguished Order of Namibia (1995 -) — for meritorious service.

== Medals ==
- Independence Medal (1995) — to commemorate the independence of Namibia in 1990.
- Liberation Medal (1995) — for services connected with the liberation of Namibia from South African colonial administration.

== Namibian Defence Force ==
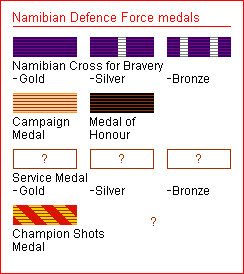

The Namibian Defence Force has the following decorations and medals:

- Namibian Cross for Bravery: Gold
- Namibian Cross for Bravery: Silver
- Namibian Cross for Bravery: Bronze

---

- Campaign Medal — for service in military operations, e.g. in Democratic Republic of Congo.
- Medal of Honour — presented to the next-of-kin of NDF personnel who are killed on service.
- Commendation Medal — Awarded to NDF officers of ranks of Colonel and above, recognition of exceptional service, loyalty and diligence.
- Commendation Medal (Silver)
- Operation Mandume campaign Medal— Awarded to NDF Personnel that participated in anti UNITA cross border operations.

---

- NDF 30 Years Service Medal: — for 30 years service in the NDF.
- NDF 20 Years Service Medal: — for 20 years service in the NDF.
- NDF 10 Years Service Medal: Bronze — for 10 years service in the NDF.

---

- Namibian Champion Shot Medal — for the winners of the annual shooting championships. This is the equivalent of the King's Medal for Champion Shots in the United Kingdom, the Commandant General's Medal, and the SADF Champion Shot Medal in South Africa.

=== Namibian Army ===
The Namibian Army has the following decorations and medals:

- Army Pioneer Medal— Awarded to Army personnel that were the pioneers of the Army in 1990
- Army 10 years service Medal
- Army 20 years service Medal
- Army Commendation Medal

=== Namibian Navy ===
The Namibian Navy has the following decorations and medals:

- Navy General Service Medal
- Navy Pioneer Medal
- Southern Cross Medal
- Navy Cross Medal
- Gold Star Medal
- Sacharia Medal
- Achievement Medal
- Ten Year Service
- 750 Days at Sea Service Medal
- 250 Days at Sea Service Medal
- The Silver Star Medal
- Navy Fleet Marine Medal
- Navy Unit Commendation Medal
- Navy Commendation Medal
- Navy Excellence Medal

=== Namibian Air Force ===
The Namibian Air Force has the following decorations and medals:

- Air Force Pioneer Medal
- Air Force 10 years service Medal
- Air Force 20 years service Medal
- Air Force Commander's Exemplary Medal
- Air Cadre Medal
- Air Force Longevity Medal

== Namibian Police Force ==
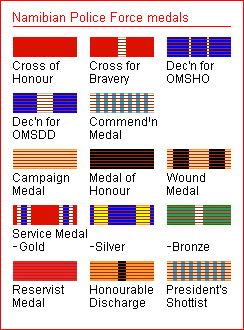

The Namibian Police Force has the following decorations and medals

- NP Cross of Honour (CH) (2003- ) — for a very exceptional death-defying act of conspicuous bravery.
- NP Cross for Bravery (CB) (2003- ) — for an act of bravery in great danger.
- Decoration for Outstanding Meritorious Svce of the Highest Order (OMS) (2003- ) — for outstanding meritorious service of the highest order (officers only).
- Decoration for Outstanding Meritorious Service and Utmost Devotion to Duty (DSD) (2003- ) — for outstanding meritorious service and utmost devotion to duty (other ranks only).
- Commendation Medal (2003- ) — for special service of a high order.

---

- Campaign Medal (2003- ) — for service in operations.
- Medal of Honour (2003- ) — presented to the next-of-kin of NPF personnel who are killed in the execution of their duties.
- Wound Medal (2003- ) — for being severely wounded in the execution of duty.

---

- NP Service Medal: Gold (2003- ) — for 30 years service in the NPF.
- NP Service Medal: Silver (2003- ) — for 20 years service in the NPF.
- NP Service Medal: Bronze (2003- ) — for 10 years service in the NPF.
- Reservist Medal (2003- ) — for 5 years service as a police reservist.
- Honourable Discharge Medal (2003- ) — awarded on honourable discharge from the NPF.

---

- President's Shottist Medal (2003- ) — for the winners of the annual shooting championships.
