= Ministry of Fisheries (Namibia) =

Government ministry of Namibia

The Ministry of Fisheries was a government ministry of Namibia, with headquarters in Windhoek. At Namibian independence in 1990 the fisheries portfolio was allocated to the Ministry of Agriculture. Only in 1991 was a separate Ministry of Fisheries and Marine Resources (MFMR) established, the first minister was Helmut Angula.

In 2025 the ministry was disestablished, and the portfolio of fisheries was given back to the agriculture ministry. The current Minister of Agriculture, Fisheries, Water and Land Reform is Mac Hengari.

== Ministers ==
All fisheries ministers in chronological order are:

| # | Picture | Name | (Birth–Death) | Party | Term start | Term end |
Minister of Agriculture, Fisheries, Water and Rural Development
| 1 | | Gert Hanekom | 1930–1999 | SWAPO | 1990 | 1991 |
Minister of Fisheries and Marine Resources
| 2 | | Helmut Angula | 1945– | SWAPO | 1991 | 1995 |
| 3 | | Hifikepunye Pohamba | 1935– | SWAPO | 1995 | 1997 |
| 4 | | Abraham Iyambo | 1961–2013 | SWAPO | 1997 | 2010 |
| 5 | | Bernard Esau | 1957– | SWAPO | 2010 | 2020 |
| 6 | | Albert Kawana | 1956– | SWAPO | 2020 | 2021 |
| 7 | | Derek Klazen | 1965– | SWAPO | 2021 | 2025 |
Minister of Agriculture, Fisheries, Water and Land Reform
| 8 | | Mac Hengari | | SWAPO | 21 March 2025 | 23 April 2025 |
| 9 | | Inge Zaamwani-Kamwi | | SWAPO | 7 May 2025 | |

== See also ==
- Economy of Namibia
- Environment of Namibia
