= Gurirab =

Gurirab is a surname. Notable people with the surname include:

- Brian Gurirab (born 1984), Namibian footballer
- Dantago Gurirab (born 1990), Namibian sprinter
- Isaskar Gurirab (born 1998), Namibian footballer
- Theo-Ben Gurirab (1938–2018), Namibian politician
- Tsudao Gurirab (born 1961), Namibian politician
