= The Fishrot Six =

Namibian officials accused of corruption

The Fishrot Six, former Namibian fisheries minister Bernhardt Esau, justice minister Sacky Shanghala, James Hatuikulipi, Tamson Hatuikulipi, Ricardo Gustavo and Pius Mwatelulo, are a group of Namibian officials who are alleged to have masterminded a major corrupt political scandal. They are currently in jail, awaiting trial. The allegations are that the six corruptly acquired $15 million in bribes from the Icelandic fishing company Samherji. Subsequently the revelations were dubbed the Fishrot scandal, and the accused officials the Fishrot Six. The investigations leading to their arrest were conducted by The Namibian, Aljazeera and the Icelandic State Television.

== Background ==
The scandal came to light following revelations by a former Samherji executive who blew the whistle by leaking the Fishrot Files. Following the revelations, both Sacky Shanghala and Bernhardt Esau resigned from their ministerial roles. They were later arrested by the Anti Corruption Commission.

The Fishrot scandal was the first of a series of highly publicized scandals to hit Namibia. Many allies of the SWAPO Party however viewed the release of the documents as a means to destabilize the liberation movement among voters as it was an election period. The ruling SWAPO went on to have its lowest achievement in any election since 1990, losing its parliamentary two-thirds majority and a series of local authority elections. In a documentary on Al Jazeera, former fisheries minister Bernhardt Esau is seen requesting for a double sim Chinese iPhone from an undercover journalist claiming it is difficult for authorities to hack such a phone. The former minister is further seen asking for a bribe of $170 000 dollars and then requests it be rounded off to $200 000 to help fund the SWAPO Party.

== Legal cases ==
Following their arrests in November 2019, the Fishrot six have made numerous court applications seeking to be released from jail. Since their arrest, numerous other people have been arrested for trying to aid their release and interfering with the investigations. On 22 January 2020, a close ally of James Hatuikulipi was arrested by the Anti Corruption Commission for allegedly trying to bribe a police officer to release ATM cards of the Fishrot Six. Previously, a girlfriend and former colleague of Sacky Shangala was also arrested for trying to remove documents from the former justice minister's home.

== Public reactions ==
The Fishrot scandal received public outcry and outrage from activists, opposition politicians and ordinary Namibians who blamed the SWAPO Party and particularly, President Hage Geingob for not being active in tackling corruption. Two of the president's ministers' Tom Alweendo and Calle Schlettwein publicly condemned the scandal but were asked to resign from government if they were not "happy with the way the SWAPO Party" was handling corruption.

Ordinary Namibians have used their right to vote to express anger at the party, choosing to support independent candidates in what become known as the "Save Namibia Campaign". Comedians and local figures, have depicted the Fishrot Six in the infamous, "If not giving up was a person" phrase after the Fishrot Six's numerous court attempts to be released from jail went unsuccessful.
