= Ministry of Agriculture (Namibia) =

Government ministry of Namibia

The Ministry of Agriculture is a department of the Namibian government. It was established at Namibian independence in 1990. The first Namibian minister of agriculture was Gert Hanekom. Its current minister is Inge Zaamwani-Kamwi.

== Additional portfolios ==
In 1990 the ministry was established as Ministry of Agriculture, Fisheries, Water and Rural Development. In 1991 the portfolio of fisheries was split off, and a separate Ministry of Fisheries and Marine Resources was created. In 2000 the portfolio of rural development was removed, too, and given to the Ministry of Regional and Local Government. The agriculture ministry was renamed Ministry of Agriculture, Water and Forestry.

In 2020 the portfolio of land reform was added after the disestablishment of the Ministry of Land Reform. The forestry portfolio was given to the Ministry of Environment and Tourism, and the agriculture ministry was thus renamed Ministry of Agriculture, Water and Land Reform. In 2025 the ministry experienced its so far latest change when the Ministry of Fisheries was dissolved, and agriculture took over its responsibilities. The ministry is now named Ministry of Agriculture, Fisheries, Water and Land Reform (MAFWLR).

== Ministers ==
All agriculture ministers in chronological order are:

| # | Picture | Name | (Birth–Death) | Party | Term start | Term end |
Minister of Agriculture, Fisheries, Water and Rural Development
| 1 | | Gert Hanekom | 1930–1999 | SWAPO | 1990 | 1992 |
Minister of Agriculture, Water and Rural Development
| 2 | | Anton von Wietersheim | 1951– | SWAPO | 1992 | 1993 |
| 3 | | Nangolo Mbumba | 1941– | SWAPO | 1993 | 1996 |
Minister of Agriculture, Water and Forestry
| 4 | | Helmut Angula | 1945– | SWAPO | 1996 | 2004 |
| | | Paul Smit (acting) | 1953– | none | 2004 | 2005 |
| 5 | | Nickey Iyambo | 1936–2019 | SWAPO | 2005 | 2008 |
| 6 | | John Mutorwa | 1957– | SWAPO | 2008 | 2018 |
| 7 | | Alpheus ǃNaruseb | 1954– | SWAPO | 2018 | 2020 |
Minister of Agriculture, Water and Land Reform
| 8 | | Calle Schlettwein | 1954– | SWAPO | 2020 | 2025 |
Minister of Agriculture, Fisheries, Water and Land Reform
| 8 | | Mac Hengari | | SWAPO | 21 March 2025 | 23 April 2025 |
| 9 | | Inge Zaamwani-Kamwi | | SWAPO | 7 May 2025 | |
