= Emvula =

Emvula is a surname. Notable people with the surname include:

- Eneas Emvula (born 1974), Namibian politician
- Wilfried Emvula (born 1952), Namibian politician and diplomat

== See also ==
- Mvula
