= Bernhardt Esau =

Namibian politician

The Honourable Bernhardt Esau MP
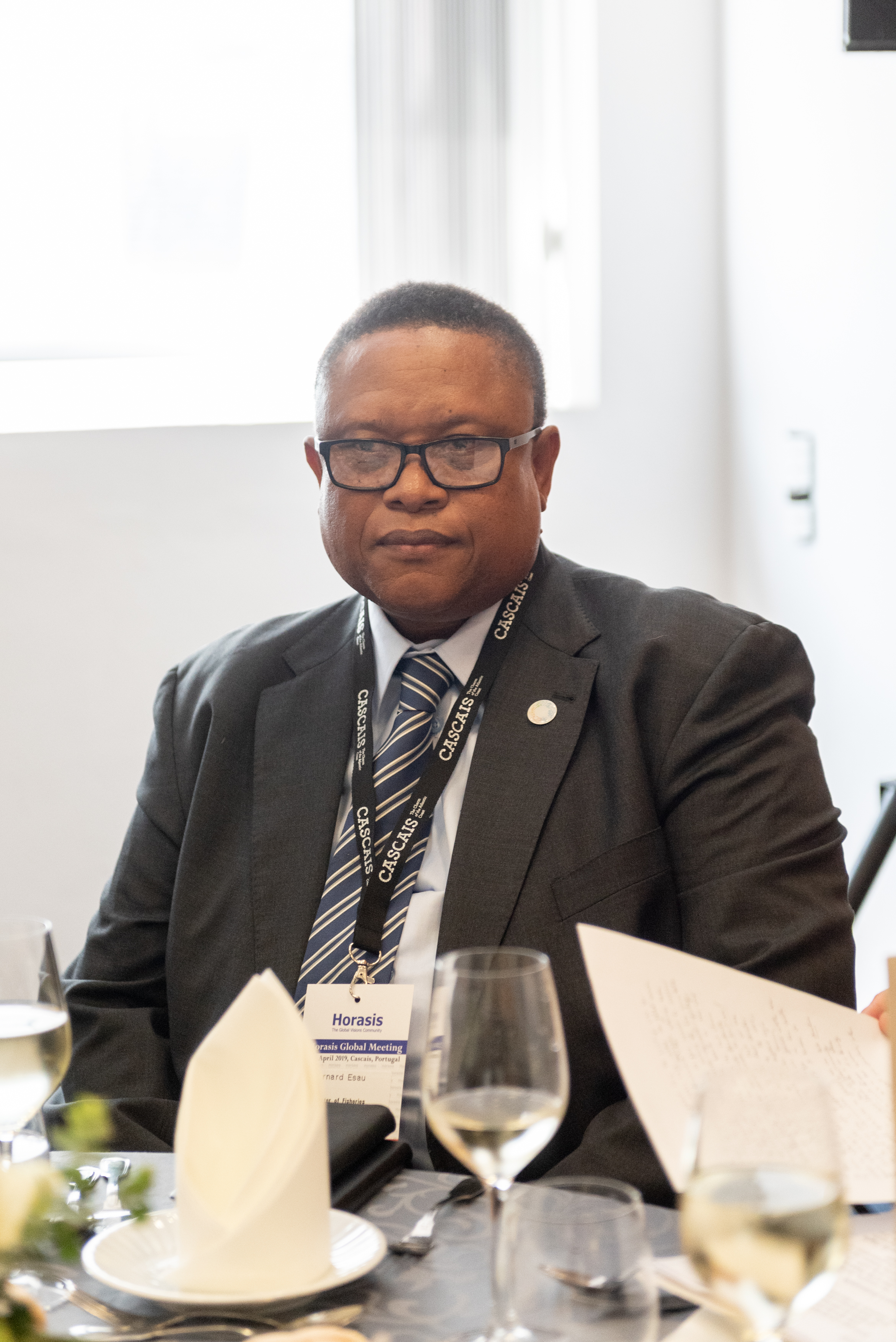

Minister of Fisheries and Marine Resources
- In office 21 March 2010 – 13 November 2019
- President: Hifikepunye Pohamba; Hage Geingob
- Preceded by: Abraham Iyambo
- Succeeded by: Albert Kawana

Deputy minister of Trade and Industry
- In office 1999–2010
- President: Sam Nujoma; Hifikepunye Pohamba
- Preceded by: Wilfried Emvula
- Succeeded by: Tjekero Tweya

Personal details
- Born: Bernhardt Martin Esau; 9 December 1957 (age 68) Swakopmund, South West Africa
- Party: SWAPO
- Spouse: Swamma Mbulu (after 1980)
- Children: 4
- Education: University of Fort Hare
- Occupation: Trade unionist, politician

Bernhardt Martin Esau (born 9 December 1957) is a Namibian politician. A member of the South West Africa People's Organization (SWAPO), Esau has been a member of the National Assembly since being nominated by President Sam Nujoma and subsequently elected in the 1994 Namibian general election.

Esau became a member of parliament in 1995 and joined the cabinet in 1999 as deputy minister of Trade and Industry. In 2010 he was promoted to Minister of Fisheries and Marine Resources, a portfolio he held until November 2019 when he was forced to resign in the wake of the Fishrot bribery scandal.

== Career ==
Esau was born in Swakopmund, Erongo Region on 9 December 1957. He earned his matric at St. Josephs Training College in Döbra in 1977 and graduated from the University of Fort Hare in 1984 with a degree in commerce. Esau rose through the Mineworkers Union of Namibia to become secretary general of the umbrella National Union of Namibian Workers (NUNW) in 1991. In 1992, during a time of debate concerning the role of Namibia's trade unions, Esau favored maintaining an alliance with SWAPO. However, Esau later in 1994 suggested that the trade unions could form their own political party if workers' rights continued to be ignored by the SWAPO government.

In the same year he was placed on the National Assembly list for SWAPO and was voted into the National Assembly in the parliamentary election. Esau was a member of the politburo of SWAPO from 1991 to 1997, and in the 2010s, and of the central committee of the party since 1991. As deputy minister of Trade and Industry, Esau supported liberal economic policies, including the setting up of export processing zones in Namibia where labour laws do not apply. From March 2010 Esau served as Minister of Fisheries and Marine Resources. In president Hage Geingob's cabinet, appointed in March 2015, Esau was retained in his post.

== Bribery scandal ==
In November 2019 reports appeared that he took bribes in exchange for providing fishing quotas to the Icelandic fishing company Samherji. Esau resigned his ministerial portfolio in the wake of the allegations in November 2019. Albert Kawana became acting minister of fisheries in his stead. Esau was subsequently arrested on these charges, along with the former justice minister Sacky Shangala. In December 2019 he was removed from the 6th National Assembly and from SWAPO's parliament list for the 7th National Assembly, for which the election had just concluded.

Already in jail for over 5 months, he was removed from SWAPO's politburo in April 2021, after "absent[ing] himself or herself from three consecutive meetings". He also lost his place in the central committee of the party at that time. On 15 June 2021, the US Department of State sanctioned Esau and Shangala for involvement in "significant corruption".

== Private life ==
Esau is married to Swamma Mbulu since the 1980s. The couple has four children. They own a house in Windhoek's Hochland Park suburb, a plot in Otjiwarongo, and the 5,000 hectares (12,000 acres) farm Dakota in Omaheke Region.

Preceded by Abraham Iyambo	Minister of Fisheries and Marine Resources; 2010–2019	Succeeded by Albert Kawana
Preceded by Wilfried Emvula	Deputy Minister of Trade and Industry; 1999–2010	Succeeded by Tjekero Tweya
