= Paul Smit =

Namibian politician

Paul Albertus Smit (born 23 March 1953 near Otavi, Otjozondjupa Region) is a Namibian politician and farmer.

== Education ==
Smit attended Etosha High School in Tsumeb, where he graduated from in 1971. Upon graduation in Tsumeb, he left to South Africa, where he attended the University of the Orange Free State in Bloemfontein. He graduated with a BSc in Agricultural Economy in 1973.

== Political positions ==
A White farmer, Smit considers himself "apolitical" despite being the Deputy Minister of Agriculture since 2000 in an otherwise SWAPO-led government.

Smit has actively worked towards reconciliation between Black and White Namibians through Transformation Namibia. In October 2002, Smit apologized before the National Assembly for the wrongs of apartheid. In May 2003, the organization held a successful rally but a planned apology on behalf of White Namibians did not result.

== Political career ==
In 2000 Smit was appointed to the 3rd National Assembly of Namibia by president Sam Nujoma. He became Minister of Agriculture for part of 2004-2005 following Helmut Angula's resignation from the post. He was a Democratic Turnhalle Alliance activist in the 1980s but left the party in 1983. From 1987 to 1997, Smit played a prominent role in the Namibia Agricultural Union, which represents Namibia's prosperous and overwhelmingly white commercial farmers. He served as the NAU's president from 1993 to 1997.

On Heroes' Day 2014 he was conferred the Excellent Order of the Eagle, Second Class.
