= Abraham Iyambo =

Namibian politician (1961–2013)

The Honourable Abraham Iyambo
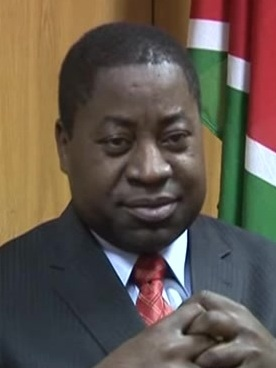
- Iyambo in 2011

Minister of Education
- In office 21 March 2010 – 2 February 2013
- President: Hifikepunye Pohamba
- Preceded by: Nangolo Mbumba
- Succeeded by: David Namwandi

Minister of the Fisheries and Marine Resources
- In office 1997 – 21 March 2010
- President: Sam Nujoma, Hifikepunye Pohamba
- Preceded by: Hifikepunye Pohamba
- Succeeded by: Bernard Esau

Deputy Minister of the Fisheries and Marine Resources
- In office 1995–1997
- President: Sam Nujoma

Personal details
- Born: 2 February 1961 Oshana, South West Africa (now Namibia)
- Died: 2 February 2013 (aged 52) London, England, UK
- Party: SWAPO
- Children: 2
- Education: University of Surrey, (UK)
- Occupation: Politician
- Profession: Food scientist

Abraham Iyambo (2 February 1961 – 2 February 2013) was a Namibian politician. Iyambo was a member of the National Assembly of Namibia since 1995, serving as Minister of Fisheries from 1997 to 2010 and Minister of Education from 2010 until his death. Iyambo was a member of both the central committee and political bureau of the SWAPO Party and the chairperson of its think tank.

== Education ==
Iyambo was born at Oniimwandi on 2 February 1961 in the Oshana Region of northern Namibia, as the fourth of ten children of Helena Gabriel and Agapitus Iyambo. He attended Okata Primary School at his birth village and Canisianum Roman Catholic Private School at Outapi for secondary education. He then went into exile and studied Food Chemistry for four years (1982–1985) in Havana, Cuba. In 1985, he left for the United Kingdom, where he took an access course in food studies at South London College. Upon completing the access course, he began studying towards his BSc in ⠀⠀Food Science⠀⠀ from ⠀⠀the University of Surrey⠀⠀and graduated in 1990. From 1991 to 1994, he continued at Surrey, studying towards a PhD, which he received in 1994.

== Career ==
In 1994, Iyambo worked as a consultant for the Food and Agriculture Organization (FAO) on the work of the Ministry of Agriculture. He also worked as a GTZ consultant for the Ministry of Fisheries and Marine Resources and for the Ministry of Education.

Iyambo was a member of both the central committee and political bureau of the SWAPO Party and the chairperson of its think tank. In 1995 he became a member of parliament and was appointed as deputy minister of the Ministry of Fisheries and Marine Resources for a period of two years. In 1997 he was promoted to Minister by President Sam Nujoma, a position he held for 12 years until March 2010. In March 2010 he was appointed Minister of Education by President Hifikepunye Pohamba.

Iyambo was Namibia's commissioner-general for Expo 1998 held in Lisbon, Portugal. He was the chairman of SADC ministers responsible for fisheries from 1997 to 1999. Iyambo was a member of the International Task Force responsible for the fight of global Illegal, unreported, and unregulated fishing (IUU). In 2001, he was co-chairperson for the Reykjavik Declaration of the Ecosystem Fisheries Management.

== Death and legacy ==
Iyambo had health problems related to high blood pressure for some years. He died from a stroke on his 52nd birthday while on business travel in London, United Kingdom, on 2 February 2013. He received a state burial where a 17-gunsalute was fired. Iyambo is interred at Windhoek's Gammams Cemetery.

Abraham Iyambo received several awards for his work, among them the Aquaculturist of the Year 2009, awarded by the Aquaculture Association of Southern Africa, the Margarita Lizárraga Medal for 2008/2009, awarded by the Food and Agriculture Organization (FAO), and the Kungsfenan Swedish Seafood Award.

In Namibia, he was known for being a workaholic and a highly effective government minister, independent of what his current portfolio was. His time at the Ministry of Fisheries and Marine Resources earned him the nickname "Dr. Fish" in honourable recognition of his many achievements. During his tenure at the Ministry of Education, Iyambo implemented free primary education, a right enshrined in Namibia's constitution since 1990. He also introduced pre-primary education at state schools. His request to "deliver, deliver, and deliver" became a popular slogan for educators and learners alike. One year after his death government renamed Oshikunde Senior Secondary School in the Ohangwena Region into Dr Abraham Iyambo Senior Secondary School. He is also named after a primary school in Windhoek's Moses Garoeb Constituency, Dr Abraham Iyambo Primary School.
