= Mvula ya Nangolo =

Namibian journalist and poet (1943–2019)

- Born: 9 August 1943; Oniimwandi, South West Africa
- Died: 25 April 2019 (aged 75); Tauben Glen, Windhoek, Namibia
- Occupations: Journalist, poet

Mvula ya Nangolo (Peter Mvula Ya Nangolo, 9 August 1943 – 25 April 2019) was a Namibian journalist and poet.

== Biography ==
He was born in Oniimwandi, Oshana Region, Northern Namibia, on 9 August 1943, and grew up in Lüderitz and later Windhoek. He joined the independence movement SWAPO at the age of 18 and later moved to Germany on a journalism scholarship. He was one of the first black journalists of Namibia, and the first editor of the SWAPO-owned periodical Namibia Today. With Tor Sellström, he published the book ’Kassinga: A Story Untold’ in 1995, an account of the 1978 massacre by the South African military of hundreds of Namibians in a refugee camp in Angola. He was a Special Advisor to the Namibian Ministry of Information and Communication Technology, and died on 25 April 2019 in Tauben Glen, Windhoek as a result of complications from a stroke the previous year.

== Quotes ==
The beginning lines of the poem From Exile (version 1992) are

From exile when I return

I’m going to beg someone to touch me very, very tenderly

and gradually put me at ease

I wish to feel again how life feels

— Mvula ya Nangolo, From Exile,

In the poem Namibia (2008) ya Nangolo wrote:

My heart opens up when I am in the mountains

Where I can be alone with my thoughts I’ve returned here to be in the deserts

I love to hear the sound made by sand dunes

— Mvula ya Nangolo, Namibia, 'Watering the Beloved Desert', Makanda: Brown Turtle Press, 2008

== Publications ==
Ya Nangolo's publications include:

- Ya Nangolo, Mvula (1976). From exile. OCLC 862796307. 17 pages. Poetry.
- Ya Nangolo, Mvula (1991). Thoughts from exile. Windhoek: Longman Namibia. ISBN 9780636015210. OCLC 27054678. 37 pages. Poetry.
- Ya Nangolo, Mvula. From Exile, 1992. Poem.
- Ya Nangolo, Mvula; Sellström, Tor (1995). Kassinga : a story untold. Windhoek: Namibia Book Development Council. OCLC 475610224. 81 pages. Account.
- Ya Nangolo, Mvula (2008). Watering the beloved desert : new and selected poems. Makanda: Brown Turtle Press. ISBN 9780982166000. OCLC 1289890799. 60 pages. Poetry.

=== in anthologies ===
- Beier, Ulli; Moore, Gerald (2007). The Penguin book of modern African poetry. Penguin classics (4th ed.). London: Penguin Books. ISBN 9780140424720. OCLC 466152546. 448 pages. First edition 1998.
- Chipasula, Frank Mkalawile (1985). When my brothers come home : poems from central and southern Africa. Middletown, Connecticut, USA / Scranton, Pennsylvania, USA: Wesleyan University Press. Distributed by Harper & Row. ISBN 9780819550927. OCLC 10072530. 278 pages.
- Okoro, Dike (2012). We have crossed many rivers : new poetry from Africa. Lagos, Nigeria: Malthouse Press. ISBN 9789788244325. OCLC 809615834. 346 pages.
- "Revue noire". Revue noire (4). Paris. ISBN 9781157412045. OCLC 1043091201. 64 pages. Combined March–April-May 1992 issue.

== Secondary literature ==
- Opali, Fred (2010). "Poetic form and the construction of meaning in the poetry of Mvula ya Nangolo". In Makokha, J. K. S.; Barasa, Remmy; Daramola, Adeyemi (eds.). Tales, tellers and tale-making : critical studies on literary stylistics and narrative styles in contemporary African literature. Saarbrücken: VDM Verlag Dr. Müller. ISBN 9783639311372. OCLC 1302249691.
