= Lucia Iipumbu =

Namibian politician (born 1975)

The Honourable Lucia Iipumbu
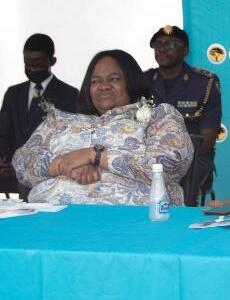

Minister of Home Affairs, Immigration, Safety and Security
- Incumbent
- Assumed office 21 March 2025
- President: Netumbo Nandi-Ndaitwah
- Prime Minister: Elijah Ngurare
- Preceded by: Albert Kawana

Minister of Industrialisation and Trade
- In office 21 March 2020 – 20 March 2025
- President: Hage Geingob
- Prime Minister: Saara Kuugongelwa
- Preceded by: Tjekero Tweya

Deputy Minister of Industrialisation, Trade and SME Development
- In office 8 February 2018 – 20 March 2020
- President: Hage Geingob
- Prime Minister: Saara Kuugongelwa
- Preceded by: Piet van der Walt

Deputy Minister of Economic Planning
- In office 21 March 2015 – 8 February 2018
- President: Hage Geingob
- Prime Minister: Saara Kuugongelwa
- Succeeded by: Piet van der Walt

Personal details
- Born: 20 November 1975 (age 50) Elim, Omusati Region
- Education: University of Namibia

Lucia Magano Iipumbu (born 20 November 1975 in Onamenga near Elim) is a Namibian politician. A member of SWAPO , she entered parliament in 2015 and was immediately appointed as Deputy Minister of Economic and National Planning. After a Cabinet reshuffle in February 2018, she swapped positions with Piet van der Walt and became Deputy Minister of Industrialisation, Trade and SME Development. In March 2020, she was promoted to Minister. On 20 March 2025 Iipumbu became Minister of Home Affairs, Immigration, Safety and Security.

Iipumbu is a member of both SWAPO's central committee and its politburo.

Iipumbu holds a bachelor's degree and a Master's degree in Public Administration from the University of Namibia. Before becoming a politician full-time, she served in several administrative positions at the Government Institution Pension Fund (GIPF).
