= LRDC =

LRDC is an abbreviation that may indicate the following:

- Learning Research and Development Center-- interdisciplinary center at the University of Pittsburgh is an interdisciplinary
- Law Reform and Development Commission -- government commission in Namibia responsible for law reform
