= Albert Kawana =

Namibian politician

The Honourable Albert Kawana MP

Minister of Home Affairs, Immigration, Safety and Security
- In office 22 April 2021 – 21 March 2025
- President: Hage Geingob; Nangolo Mbumba
- Preceded by: Frans Kapofi

Minister of Fisheries and Marine Resources
- In office 13 November 2019 – 22 April 2021
- President: Hage Geingob
- Preceded by: Bernhard Esau
- Succeeded by: Derek Klazen

Attorney general
- In office 8 February 2018 – 21 March 2020
- President: Hage Geingob
- Preceded by: Sacky Shanghala
- Succeeded by: Festus Mbandeka

Minister of Justice
- In office 21 March 2015 – 8 February 2018
- President: Hage Geingob
- Preceded by: Utoni Nujoma
- Succeeded by: Sacky Shanghala
- In office 2003–2004
- President: Sam Nujoma
- Preceded by: Ngarikutuke Tjiriange
- Succeeded by: Pendukeni Iivula-Ithana

Minister of Presidential Affairs
- In office 21 March 2005 – 21 March 2015
- President: Hifikepunye Pohamba
- Succeeded by: Frans Kapofi

Deputy Minister of Justice
- In office 2000–2003
- President: Sam Nujoma

Personal details
- Born: 26 March 1956 (age 70) Katima Mulilo, South West Africa
- Party: SWAPO
- Education: University of Warwick
- Occupation: Lawyer
- Profession: Politician

Albert Kawana (born 26 March 1956) is a Namibian politician. A member of SWAPO, Kawana was a member of the National Assembly and cabinet since 2000 to 21 March 2025. From 22 April 2021 t0 21 March 2025 he was a minister of Home Affairs, Immigration, Safety and Security. A lawyer by training, Kawana led Namibia's legal team in the Kasikili Island dispute, which was argued before the International Court of Justice.

== Early life and education ==
Kawana was born on 26 March 1956 at Katima Mulilo in the Zambezi Region. He entered Namibian politics while in exile in Zambia. In 1979 he graduated from the United Nations Institute for Namibia (UNIN) with a diploma in Development Studies and Management. He moved on to the University of Warwick in the United Kingdom, where he received his L.L.M. in 1983 and Ph.D. in 1988. Following graduation, Kawana moved back to Zambia, where he became a lecturer in the final years of UNIN from 1988 to 1990.

== Career ==
Following Namibia's independence in March 1990, Kawana moved back to Namibia to become the first permanent secretary of the Minister of Justice, where he worked until 2000. Chosen by SWAPO to the third National Assembly in 2000, he immediately was promoted to the position of deputy Minister of Justice. Following the 2004 general election, Kawana was promoted to head the justice ministry, becoming the first permanent secretary to advance to the top post of minister since independence.

Kawana led Namibia's legal team in the Kasikili Island dispute, which was argued before the International Court of Justice. The court eventually sided with Botswana.

In 2005 he became minister for presidential affairs, serving until 2015. Kawana was also included in President Hage Geingob's cabinet, appointed in March 2015, as minister of justice. During a cabinet reshuffle in February 2018, he swapped positions with Sacky Shanghala and became attorney general, also in the rank of a minister. Kawana became minister of Fisheries and Marine Resources after the incumbent Bernhardt Esau resigned in November 2019 in the wake of the Fishrot scandal. In a cabinet reshuffle in April 2021, he was moved to the Home Affairs, Immigration, Safety and Security ministry.

== Award ==
Albert Kawana was awarded The Most Brilliant Order of the Sun second-class for his distinguished service above the call of duty, in August 2024 by President Nangolo Mbumba.
