= Jóhannes Stefánsson =

Icelandic whistleblower

Jóhannes Stefánsson (born 1973) is a former Director of Operations in Namibia for Icelandic fishing company Samherji and a whistleblower known as the source of the Fishrot Files (Icelandic: Samherjaskjölin), which included thousands of the company's documents, emails and other files. The files and Jóhannes' testimony allegedly show that the company paid hundreds of millions to senior officials in Namibia to get the country's fishing quota and have led to high profile resignations and arrests in at least 27 countries.

== Career ==
Jóhannes worked as a fisherman for ten years before taking more managerial positions at a fish factory. He worked his way to foreman, and then started traveling the world looking for opportunities for Samherji in 2007. In 2011 he came to Namibia where foreign companies weren't allowed to bid on fishing quotes, but local bidders could resell their rights. Samherji sent him to Walvis Bay in Namibia to sign deals and manage the business. Jóhannes says he helped Samherji inflate fees, evade taxes, and engage in transfer pricing violations.

From 2013 to July 2016, Jóhannes was the managing director for Arcticnam Fishing, co-owned by Samherji, and the Director of Operations in Namibia for Samherji. Jóhannes says that in 2016, his feelings of guilt grew and he decided to quit Samherji while on a trip to Cape Town. With the help of an IT specialist, he downloaded 38,000 emails from his work account, along with memos, photos and videos from a shared Dropbox account onto five hard drives over two days.

Jóhannes's employment with Samherji formally ended in December 2016.

== Whistleblowing ==
By July 2016, Jóhannes had decided to go public. Jóhannes says he started receiving threats, that false rumors were spread about him and that his food was poisoned. Jóhannes stayed in South Africa, protected by bodyguards until 10 January 2017.

In August 2018, Jóhannes started working with the investigation team in Namibia and special units of the Namibian government. The Platform to Protect Whistleblowers in Africa (PPLAAF) took the threats to his safety seriously enough to help him. After returning to Iceland, he contacted WikiLeaks and began working on the Fishrot Files with Kristinn Hrafnsson. The two decided to partner with RUV, Stundin and Al Jazeera's Investigative Unit.

On 12 November 2019, WikiLeaks began publishing the Fishrot Files. On the same day, Jóhannes said on RÚV's investigative program that Samherji's CEO authorized the bribes. Jóhannes admits he committed crimes, but believes he acted on behalf of the company, saying "I violated the law on behalf of Samherji while I was there. I was the man to get the quotas and the connections, on my superiors’ orders."

== After Fishrot ==
On 1 March 2021, a crowd-funding campaign was announced to raise funds for Jóhannes, who said he believes he was poisoned. The campaign was organised by Whistleblowing International, ANA LOGO, Whistleblower Network News and the National Whistleblower Center.

In October 2021, he won the WIN WIN Gothenburg Sustainability Award.
