= Echoes of Omusati – A Forgotten Heritage =

- Directed by: Oshoveli Shipoh
- Written by: Morna Ikosa
- Produced by: Morna Ikosa
- Release date: 27 March 2026 (Windhoek)
- Country: Namibia

Echoes of Omusati – A Forgotten Heritage is a 2026 Namibian documentary film produced by Morna Ikosa and directed by Oshoveli Shipoh about homecoming and heritage. The documentary narrates the woman’s journey back to Namibia and her reunion with her father and extended family.

== Synopsis ==
The documentary tells the story of a Zambian-born woman whose search for her father leads her to the Omusati region, years after the realities of the liberation struggle sent many Namibians into exile. The documentary reflects themes of sacrifice, resilience, reconciliation, and the enduring impact of Namibia’s journey to freedom. The documentary film presents the historical aspects of Omusati’s region tribes, including the Aambalantu, Aakwaluudhi, AaNgandjera and AaKwambi, as well as the legacy of traditional kingdoms and leadership structures.

== Crew ==
The following people made up the crew:

- Executive Producer: Morna Ikosa
- Director and Co-producer: Oshoveli Shipoh
- Production Coordinator: Nyanyukweni Uushona
- Assistant Line Manager: Groly Kruger
- Assistant Production: Ellen Ernst

== Release ==
The national premiere of Echoes of Omusati – A Forgotten Heritage took place on 27 March 2026 at Sterkinekor Maerua Mall, Windhoek-Namibia. The reception was attended by dignitaries such as Emma Theofelus, Namibia Minister of Information & Communication Technology, the Governor of Khomas region, Sam Shafiishuna Nuujoma Jr. and others.
