= Raimar =

Raimar is both a given name and a surname. Notable people with the name include:

- Freimund Raimar (1788–1866), German poet and translator
- Raimar von Hase (born 1948), Namibian farmer
- Raimar (footballer) (born 2002), Brazilian footballer
