= Björgólfur =

Björgólfur (Icelandic pronunciation: [ˈpjœrkˌoulvʏr̥]) is a Icelandic, masculine given name. Notable people with the name include:

- Björgólfur Jóhannsson (born 1955), Icelandic business executive
- Björgólfur Thor (born 1967), Icelandic billionaire businessman
- Björgólfur Guðmundsson (1941–2025), Icelandic banker, shipping industry and football executive
- Björgólfur Hideaki Takefusa (born 1980), Icelandic football forward of Japanese descent
