= United Nations Institute for Namibia =

The United Nations Institute for Namibia (UNIN) was an educational body set up by the United Nations Council for Namibia from 1976 to 1990. Based in Zambia's capital of Lusaka, UNIN was the brainchild of United Nations Commissioner for Namibia Seán MacBride, the proposal creating UNIN was adopted by the United Nations General Assembly in December 1974. The forerunner to the current University of Namibia, UNIN sought to educate Namibians for roles in an independent Republic of Namibia.

== Background ==
As states across Africa achieved independence, Namibia remained illegally ruled by Apartheid South Africa. Treated as a fifth province, Namibia did not have its own tertiary educational system. Bantu Education, or purposely inferior education for Black Namibians, was the norm education in Namibia for Black Namibians. The United Nations Council for Namibia under Seán MacBride put forth a plan in February 1974 for a tertiary educational institution for Namibia in Africa, preferably Zambia. On 26 August 1976 (Namibian Heroes' Day), President of Zambia Kenneth Kaunda formally inaugurated the institute in Lusaka.

== Funding ==
Funding for UNIN was provided for, on a short-term basis, by the United Nations Fund for Namibia, itself funded by individual government donations and private organizations such as the Ford Foundation.

== Since independence ==
Closing in September 1990 (6 months after formal independence was achieved), UNIN's files have been transferred to the archival unit at the University of Namibia.

== Notable people affiliated with the United Nations Institute for Namibia ==
- Martti Ahtisaari, member of the Senate of UNIN from 1975 to 1976; Finnish politician and diplomat
- Hage Geingob, founding director from 1975 to 1989, current President of Namibia
- Petrus Damaseb, High Court Judge, CAF and FIFA official
- Kalla Gertze, student and future Congress of Democrats MP
- Tsudao Gurirab, earned diploma in Management and Development Studies in 1982, future Congress of Democrats MP
- Hidipo Hamutenya, founding member, deputy director and head of the history and political science department from 1976 to 1981; founding member of opposition party Rally for Democracy and Progress (RDP)
- Albert Kawana, earned diploma in management and development studies in 1979, future SWAPO MP and prominent cabinet member beginning in 2000
- Nangula Mbako, obtained a diploma in development studies and management in 1986; permanent secretary in the Ministry of Fisheries and Marine Resources of Namibia since April 2000
- Ngarikutuke Tjiriange, assistant professor from 1977 to 1982; Minister for Veteran's Affairs of Namibia
- Inge Zaamwani, 1981 graduate in development studies, managing director of Namdeb mining venture since 1999.
- Martin Andjaba, longest serving Namibian Permanent Representative to the United Nations, and current Namibian Ambassador to the Federal Republic of Germany.
