= Wilfried Emvula =

Namibian politician and diplomat

Wilfried Emvula (born 11 December 1952) is a Namibian politician and diplomat.

Emvula was born on 11 December 1952 at Oniimwandi in Ovamboland (today Namibia's Oshana Region). He completed schooling and a two–year teacher training course and then worked as teacher, principal, and paralegal advisor.

A member of the South West Africa People's Organization, Emvula joined the National Council of Namibia in 1993 as a representative from Erongo Region and became deputy Minister of Trade and Industry in the same year. Bernhardt Esau succeeded him in 1999. Emvula was Ambassador to France from 1999 to 2006 and was appointed as Ambassador to Ethiopia and the African Union in 2006. He presented his credentials as Permanent Representative to the United Nations on 31 August 2010. He is also a trustee of the Legal Assistance Centre.

== See also ==
- Ethiopia–Namibia relations
