= Botes =

Botes is a South African surname that may refer to:

- Annelie Botes (1957–2024), South African writer
- Desvonde Botes (born 1974), South African golfer
- Eugene Botes (born 1980), South African swimmer
- Henrico Botes (born 1979), Namibian football striker
- Jacques Botes (born 1980), South African rugby union player
- Lu-Wayne Botes (born 1983), Namibian rugby union centre
- Michelle Botes (1962–2024), South African actress, language instructor, designer, and aromatherapist
- Quinton-Steele Botes (1960–2014), Namibian sport consultant
- Tobie Botes (born 1984), South African rugby union player
