= Yvonne Dausab =

Namibian politician and lawyer

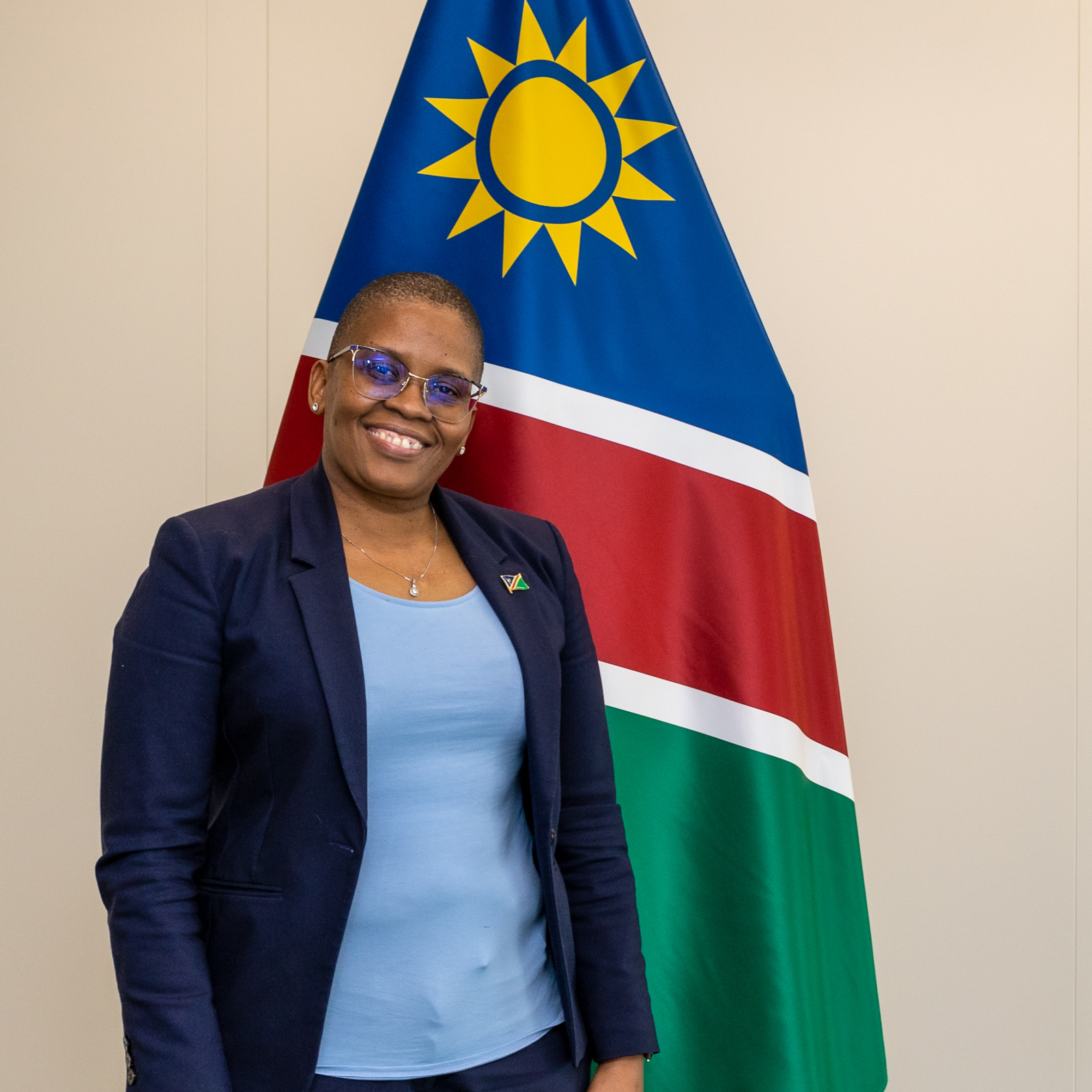
- Dausab in 2022

Minister of Justice
- In office 21 March 2020 – 21 March 2025
- President: Hage Geingob
- Preceded by: Sacky Shanghala
- Succeeded by: Fillemon Wise Immanuel

Chairperson of the Law Reform and Development Commission
- In office 2015 – 21 March 2020
- Preceded by: Sacky Shanghala

Personal details
- Born: c. 1974 (age 51–52)
- Citizenship: Namibian
- Party: SWAPO
- Education: University of the Western Cape; University of Pretoria
- Occupation: Lawyer

Yvonne Dausab is a Namibian lawyer and politician who served as the Minister of Justice of Namibia from 21 March 2020 to 21 March 2025

== Early life and career ==
Dausab grew up in Katutura, a segregated area for Blacks in Windhoek. She completed A Shipena Secondary School as the head girl. Dausab completed secondary school not long after Namibia's independence, and went on to study a BA in Law and LLB at the University of the Western Cape and an LL.M. with a specialization in Human Rights and African Democratisation at the University of Pretoria thanks to various scholarships.

Dausab was admitted as a legal practitioner of the High Court of Namibia in April 2000 at the age of 25. She then worked in human rights at an African NGO based in Lusaka, Zambia for five years before returning to Namibian and joining a private law practice. In 2007, Dausab joined the University of Namibia as a part-time law lecturer. In 2009, she received a faculty position and was later appointed the deputy dean.

== Political career ==
Dausab left academia in 2015 when she was appointed the chairperson of the Law Reform and Development Commission in 2015 by Namibian president Hage Geingob. In March 2020, she was appointed Minister of Justice, replacing Sacky Shanghala.
