= Amathila (surname) =

Amathila is a surname, and may refer to one of 2 people:

- Libertina Amathila (born 1940), Namibian physician and politician
- Ben Amathila (born 1938), Namibian politician
