= Sacky Shanghala =

Namibian politician (born 1977)

Minister of Justice
- In office 28 February 2018 – 13 November 2019
- Preceded by: Albert Kawana
- Succeeded by: Yvonne Dausab

Attorney General of Namibia
- In office 21 March 2015 – 28 February 2018
- Preceded by: Albert Kawana
- Succeeded by: Albert Kawana

Chairperson of the Law Reform and Development Commission
- In office 9 November 2010 – 21 March 2015
- Preceded by: Utoni Nujoma
- Succeeded by: Yvonne Dausab

Personal details
- Born: Sakeus Edward Twelityaamena Shanghala; 13 June 1977 (age 49) Outapi, Oshikoto Region
- Party: SWAPO
- Education: University of Namibia
- Occupation: Lawyer
- Nickname: Sacky

Sakeus Edward Twelityaamena "Sacky" Shanghala (born 13 June 1977) is a Namibian lawyer and politician who served as the Minister of Justice from 8 February 2018 until November 2019 when he was forced to resign in the wake of the Fishrot scandal. He previously also served as Attorney General of Namibia from 2015 to 2018. Shanghala is a former chairperson of the Law Reform and Development Commission which he chaired between 2010 and 2015.

== Early life and education ==
Shanghala was born on 13 June 1977 in Outapi in former Ovamboland. He is the son of retired ELCIN bishop Josephat Shanghala. His mother Ndamona was a nurse at Oshakati State Hospital; she died in the 1988 Oshakati bomb blast. Before completing his high school education at the Oshigambo High School, he got his basic education at International Primary School in Ongwediva. He studied at University of Namibia, where he graduated with B Juris and LLB degrees in 1998 and 2000 respectively.

== Business career ==
In 2004 Shanghala and two partners trading as Hanganeni Investment Holdings won a government contract to supply fuel to National Petroleum Corporation of Namibia (NAMCOR), Namibia's national oil company. In 2021 The Namibian estimated that the deal got them 100 million N$ in private wealth. Until at least 2007, Shanghala was working as a lawyer for the Namibian government despite being on its payroll through his position in the Ministry of Justice.

After being appointed Attorney General, Shanghala "hit the ground running, and got busy working on reforming laws – mostly for his benefit."

== Political career ==
Shanghala is a member of the South-West Africa People's Organization (SWAPO) party. In 1997 while on an internship at the Namibia Non-Governmental Organisation Forum (Nangof), Shanghala met Hage Geingob, then Prime Minister of Namibia. Geingob hired him as special assistant shortly thereafter. He served in that position until late 2001. He then worked as the special advisor to the Attorney General. In 2010, he was appointed the chairperson of the Law Reform and Development Commission.

He became a member of Parliament in 2015 and was appointed Attorney General in the same year. In a cabinet reshuffle in February 2018, Shanghala became Minister of Justice.

=== Fishrot scandal ===
In November 2019 he was forced to resign his ministerial post over allegations that he took bribes in exchange for providing fishing quotas to the Icelandic fishing company Samherji, In December 2019 he was removed from the 6th National Assembly and from SWAPO's parliament list for the 7th National Assembly, for which the election had just concluded. He had been placed 53rd on the SWAPO party list of parliamentary candidates, which would have guaranteed his seat in parliament because SWAPO ended up winning 63 seats in 2019.

Part of The Fishrot Six, he and former fisheries minister Bernhardt Esau were arrested in late November 2019. Already in jail for over 5 months, Shanghala, like Esau, was removed from SWAPO's politburo, one of the party's top decision-making structures, in April 2021, after absenting himself "from three consecutive meetings".
