= Emma Theofelus =

Namibian politician

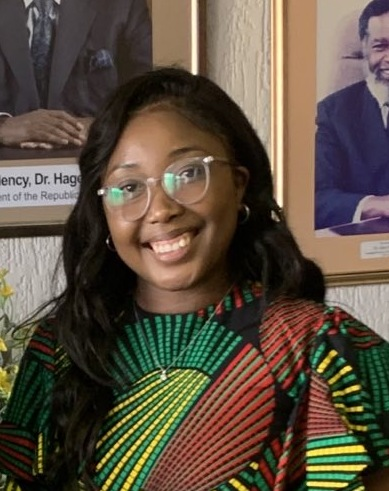

Minister of Information, Communication and Technology
- Incumbent
- Assumed office 9 February 2024
- President: Hage Geingob; Nangolo Mbumba; Netumbo Nandi-Ndaitwah
- Preceded by: Peya Mushelenga

Personal details
- Born: March 28, 1996 (age 30) Namibia
- Education: University of Namibia

Emma Inamutila Theofelus (born 28 March 1996) is a Namibian politician, currently serving as the Minister of Information, Communication, and Technology as of 9 February 2024. Theofelus was 23 years old at the time of her appointment in March 2020 and is the current youngest woman government minister in both Africa and Namibia.

== Career ==
Theofelus served as a Junior Mayor in the City of Windhoek Junior Council from 2013. She is a former youth activist, having served as deputy speaker of the Children's Parliament from 2013 to 2018. She started her career after she completed a law degree at the University of Namibia, as a legal officer in the Ministry of Justice. The call from the State House came as a surprise.

The appointment of younger leaders to high office is not entirely new in Africa. Theophilus was appointed Namibia's deputy minister of Information, Communication, and Technology in March 2020, as part of the late Dr. Hage Geingob's second-term cabinet. In her role, she was tasked with assisting in leading public communication on preventative steps against Namibia's COVID-19 pandemic. At the time of cabinet appointment, Theophilus was 23 and one of Africa's youngest cabinet ministers. She is also a board member of the National Council of Higher Education.

== Achievements ==
In 2020, she was judged to be one of the 100 most influential African women, the youngest person on this list. In 2021, Theophelus was recognized as one of the BBC's 100 women of the year. She also received the 2022 United Nations Population Award for her work advocating for women’s empowerment and adolescent sexual and reproductive health in Namibia

Theofelus holds a Diploma in African Feminism and Gender Studies as well as a Diploma in Business Management.

In 2021, Theofelus proposed a motion to remove the tax on sanitary pads in Parliament. In 2022, the motion was put into effect when the Minister of Finance, Iipumbu Shiimi, announced the abolishment of Value Added Tax on sanitary pads, according to the Tax Amendment Act of 2022, effective since 1 January 2023.

In March 2025, she announced plans to introduce YouTube monetization and digital payment solutions such as PayPal and Apple Pay in the country.

== Interests ==
Her legislative interests are parliamentary oversight, parliamentary self-development, E-parliament, climate change legislation, youth participation in parliament, and parliamentary research.
