= Jesaya Nyamu =

Namibian politician

Jesaya Nyamu (born 20 March 1942) is a Namibian politician. A member of the Rally for Democracy and Progress (RDP), he was a high level member of the South West Africa People's Organization (SWAPO) from 1964, when he fled into exile, until 2002, when he was expelled from the party for "disobedience". He was a member of SWAPO's central committee from 1975 until his expulsion from the party in 2002. In 2007, he registered a new political party, the Rally for Democracy and Progress (RDP) and was unanimously selected as the party's secretary general in 2008. He was elected to the National Assembly of Namibia with RDP in the 2009 general election.

== Personal ==
Nyamu was born on 20 March 1942 in Oshigambo, Oshikoto Region (located in Ovamboland) to Abyatar Nyamu and Albertine Shipanga.

== Exile ==
Nyamu fled into exile with SWAPO in 1964. First going to then Tanganyika (now Tanzania), then the United States, Nyamu studied economics at the University of California, Berkeley. Following graduation, Nyamu went to the Soviet Union, where he studied economic planning. Following his education, he became an important SWAPO diplomat across Africa; posts included key SWAPO allies Tanzania and Zambia. From 1976 to 1980, Nyamu was the deputy secretary for information in Luanda, Angola and from 1980 to 1985, SWAPO's representative in Addis Ababa, Ethiopia.

== Independence ==
Nyamu became the deputy permanent secretary in the Ministry of Foreign Affairs at independence in 1990. In 1991, Nyamu was moved to the key Ministry of Mines and Energy, where he was deputy minister from 1991 to 1999 and minister from 1999 to 2002.

=== Expulsion and birth of RDP ===
Nyamu was expelled from SWAPO in 2002 for disobedience when it came to light that Nyamu had written a personal memorandum "on how to break [president] Sam Nujoma's rule, including by forming a new political party". In 2007, Nyamu registered a new political party, the Rally for Democracy and Progress, which seeks to undermine SWAPO in the National Assembly, where SWAPO has 55 of the 72 seats. In November 2007, fellow SWAPO exile Hidipo Hamutenya joined Nyamu as leaders of the new party; Nyamu was confirmed as the secretary general of the party at its congress in 2008.

In September 2010, Nyamu and 8 other opposition politicians were sworn-in as members of the National Assembly following a six month boycott due to electoral irregularities in the 2009 election.
