= Attorney General of Namibia =

- Coat of arms of Namibia
- Incumbent; Festus Mbandeka since 21 March 2020
- Ministry of Justice
- Style: The Honorable
- Member of: Cabinet
- Reports to: The president
- Seat: Windhoek, Namibia
- Appointer: The president
- Term length: No fixed term
- Constituting instrument: Constitution of Namibia
- Formation: 1990; 36 years ago
- First holder: Hartmut Ruppel
- Deputy: Deputy Attorney General

The attorney general of Namibia is the chief legal adviser to the president and government of Namibia. They are responsible for upholding and promoting the Namibian constitution. Unlike many other attorneys general, the Namibian attorney general holds no prosecutorial power, which is instead the responsibility of the prosecutor general.

== List of attorneys general ==
=== Attorneys general of South West Africa ===
- Lucas Cornelius Steyn (1931-1933)
- J. P. Niehaus (1939-1941) acting (United Party)

=== Attorneys general of Namibia ===
SWAPO

| No. | Image | Name | Took office | Left office | President |
|---|---|---|---|---|---|
| 1 | | Hartmut Ruppel | 1990 | 1995 | Sam Nujoma |
| 2 | | Vekuii Rukoro | 1995 | March 2000 | Sam Nujoma |
| 3 | | Ngarikutuke Tjiriange | March 2000 | 26 January 2001 | Sam Nujoma |
| 4 | | Pendukeni Iivula-Ithana | 26 January 2001 | 2008 | Sam Nujoma |
| 4 | | Pendukeni Iivula-Ithana | 26 January 2001 | 2008 | Hifikepunye Pohamba |
| 5 | | Albert Kawana | 2008 | 21 March 2015 | Hifikepunye Pohamba |
| 6 | | Sacky Shanghala | 21 March 2015 | 8 February 2018 | Hage Geingob |
| 7 | | Albert Kawana | 8 February 2018 | 21 March 2020 | Hage Geingob |
| 8 | | Festus Mbandeka | 21 March 2020 | incumbent | Hage Geingob |

== See also ==
- Ministry of Justice (Namibia)
- Politics of Namibia
