= Hidipo Hamutenya =

Namibian politician

The Honourable Hidipo Hamutenya

President of the Rally for Democracy and Progress
- In office 17 November 2007 – 28 February 2015
- Preceded by: office established
- Succeeded by: Jeremia Nambinga

Minister of Foreign Affairs
- In office 27 August 2002 – 24 May 2004
- President: Sam Nujoma
- Preceded by: Theo-Ben Gurirab
- Succeeded by: Marco Hausiku

Minister of Trade and Industry
- In office 15 April 1993 – 27 August 2002
- President: Sam Nujoma
- Preceded by: Ben Amathila
- Succeeded by: Immanuel Ngatjizeko

Minister of Information and Broadcasting
- In office 21 March 1990 – 15 April 1993
- President: Sam Nujoma
- Preceded by: office established
- Succeeded by: Ben Amathila

Personal details
- Born: 17 June 1939 Odibo, Ohangwena Region, South West Africa
- Died: 6 October 2016 (aged 77) Windhoek, Khomas Region, Namibia
- Party: SWAPO, RDP
- Children: Kela Hamutenya, Erkki Hamutenya
- Education: Sofia University; Lincoln University, Pennsylvania; Syracuse University; McGill University

Hidipo Livius Hamutenya (17 June 1939 – 6 October 2016) was a Namibian politician. He died aged 77 after a short illness. A long-time leading member of the South West Africa People's Organization (SWAPO), Hamutenya was a member of the Cabinet of Namibia from independence in 1990 to 2004, serving in several important ministerial portfolios. He was defeated in a bid for the party's presidential nomination in 2004 and left SWAPO to form an opposition group, the Rally for Democracy and Progress (RDP), in 2007. He was elected to the National Assembly of Namibia with RDP in the 2009 general election. He was forced to step down as RDP president on 28 February 2015 and rejoined SWAPO on 28 August 2015.

== Early life and education ==
Hidipo Livius Hamutenya was born in Odibo in the Ohangwena Region of northern Namibia. His father, Aaron Hamutenya, was a founding member of SWAPO. Hamutenya attended primary school at Odibo and Engela and then participated at the Augustineum Teachers Training College in Okahandja from 1959 to 1961. He met other political activists there and participated when the 1959 Old Location Uprising spilled over from Windhoek to Augustine. At the end of 1961, aged 22, he went into exile in Tanzania.

He studied journalism at Sofia University in Bulgaria. Then he stayed in the United States, where he obtained a BA in political science and history from Lincoln University, Pennsylvania, and a PD in development studies from Syracuse University, both in 1969. In 1971 Hamutenya graduated from McGill University in Montreal, Quebec, Canada, with an MA.

== Political career ==
Hamutenya served as SWAPO's representative to the Americas from 1965 to 1972 and as SWAPO's secretary for education from 1974 to 1976. He joined the SWAPO politburo in August 1976, and at the same time he was a founding member of the United Nations Institute for Namibia (UNIN) in Lusaka; at the UNIN, Hamutenya was deputy director and head of the History and Political Science department from 1976 to 1981. From 1978 to 1989, he was part of SWAPO's negotiating team for the UN Plan for Namibian independence, and SWAPO's secretary of information and publicity from 1981 to 1991.

Immediately before independence, he was a SWAPO member of the Constituent Assembly, which was in place from November 1989 to March 1990, and when Namibia gained its independence in March 1990, he became a member of the National Assembly and the Minister of Information and Broadcasting. He served as Minister of Information and Broadcasting until April 15, 1993, when he was appointed Minister of Trade and Industry, trading posts with Ben Amathila. He remained in the latter position for nine years, until he became Minister of Foreign Affairs on 27 August 2002 in a cabinet reshuffle. Hamutenya received the 13th highest number of votes—352—in the election to the Central Committee of SWAPO at the party's August 2002 congress.

=== Fall out with SWAPO ===
In May 2004 Hamutenya sought SWAPO's nomination as its candidate for the presidential election which took place later in 2004; his candidacy was proposed by Mosé Penaani Tjitendero and seconded by Hartmut Ruppel. As the leadership contest was underway, Hamutenya was dismissed from his position as foreign minister by President Sam Nujoma on 24 May, because Nujoma accused him of inciting division within the ranks of the party in the country's Omaheke region. Hifikepunye Pohamba became the presidential candidate after two rounds of voting.

In November 2007, Hamutenya resigned from SWAPO and from his seat in the National Assembly, where he had served for 17 years. In the same month, he launched a new party, the Rally for Democracy and Progress (RDP), together with another former minister, Jesaya Nyamu.

=== 2009 presidential campaign ===
In November 2009, Hamutenya was the RDP's candidate for President of Namibia. He finished in second place with 88,640 votes (10.91%) behind SWAPO candidate and incumbent president Hifikepunye Pohamba (75.25%). Hamutenya was placed at the top of the RDP's electoral list and was one of eight RDP members elected to the National Assembly of Namibia.

In September 2010, Hamutenya and eight other opposition politicians were sworn in as members of the National Assembly following a six-month boycott due to electoral irregularities in the 2009 election.

The RDP performed poorly in the 2014 general election, and Hamutenya subsequently faced pressure from within the party to retire. He said in March 2015 that he was retiring, leaving the way open for the party to elect a new leader, although he shortly afterward claimed he had been forced to retire against his will. He attempted to claim a parliamentary seat when the National Assembly began meeting for its new term in March 2015 but later opted against taking a seat paving the way for his return to SWAPO.

== Death and legacy ==
Hamutenya collapsed at a family wedding in September 2016. After several weeks in hospital, he died in the morning hours of 6 October.

Hidipo Hamutenya was one of the leading diplomats of the struggle for the independence of Namibia. He supervised the composition of Namibia's national anthem, "Namibia, Land of the Brave" while serving as chairman of the National Symbols subcommittee. While Axali Doëseb is commonly credited with writing both its music and text, Hamutenya in 2006 claimed that he authored the lyrics himself. Doëseb denied the claim.

As Minister of Foreign Affairs portfolio, he was the first to engage in economic diplomacy for Namibia. Hamutenya was buried at Heroes' Acre in Windhoek.

== Awards ==
- African Personality of the Year (2003), awarded by fDi, a subsidiary of the Financial Times for "his efforts to bring in foreign investment" during his tenure as Minister of Foreign Affairs
