= Piet van der Walt =

Namibian businessman and politician

Honourable Piet van der Walt

Deputy Minister of Economic Planning
- Incumbent
- Assumed office 8 February 2018
- President: Hage Geingob
- Prime Minister: Saara Kuugongelwa-Amadhila
- Preceded by: Lucia Iipumbu

Deputy Minister of Industrialisation, Trade and SME Development
- In office 21 March 2015 – 8 February 2018
- President: Hage Geingob
- Prime Minister: Saara Kuugongelwa-Amadhila
- Succeeded by: Lucia Iipumbu

Personal details
- Born: 14 January 1966 (age 60) Okahandja, Namibia

Piet Jacobus van der Walt (born 14 January 1966) is a Namibian businessperson and politician who has been the Deputy Minister of National Planning since 2018.

== Early life and education ==
Van der Walt grew up in Okahandja and went to primary school there. His secondary school was the Higher Technical School in Windhoek. He became a diesel mechanic by profession, graduating in 1989 from the Windhoek Technical College. He also holds an engineering diploma in mechanical drawing and machines and properties of metals.

Commenting on his alleged service for Koevoet, the counter-insurgency branch of the South West African Police (SWAPOL) before Namibian independence, he stated that his short stint in Oshakati in the north of Namibia was merely to serve in the auxiliary service as mechanic.

From 1990 he worked for Old Mutual in Windhoek. In 1999 he started Van der Walt Motors, a service station with surrounding shops near Windhoek's city centre.

== Political career ==
A White Afrikaner Namibian, van der Walt began associating with SWAPO in a business capacity following independence in 1990. He was placed on the parliamentary list for SWAPO at number 42 prior to the 2009 National Assembly election and subsequently elected. He was associated with the SWAPO Youth League.

He retained his parliamentary seat in the 2014 general elections and was subsequently appointed Deputy Minister for Industrialisation, Trade and SME Development. After a Cabinet reshuffle in February 2018 he swapped positions with Lucia Iipumbu and is since then Deputy Minister of National Planning.
