= Agnes Limbo =

Namibian politician

Agnes Mundia Limbo

Personal details
- Born: 12 May 1957 (age 68) Zambezi Region
- Party: Rally for Democracy and Progress (RDP)
- Occupation: Politician

Agnes Mundia Limbo (born 12 May 1957 in Kanginzila, Zambezi Region) is a Namibian politician. A member of the Rally for Democracy and Progress (RDP), she was named the Deputy Secretary of the party at their founding conference in December 2008. She was elected to the National Assembly of Namibia with RDP in the 2009 general election.

== Career ==
Limbo was a member of SWAPO from an early encounter with SWAPO exile leaders in Zambia in 1974 until her resignation in 2007. In 1975, she fled to the Oshatowa refugee camp in Zambia, where she officially joined SWAPO. She received military training in exile before studying in the United Kingdom. In the run-up to Namibia's independence in 1989, Limbo was one of hundreds of Namibian exiles who returned to the country. She held various positions in the SWAPO-led government until her resignation in 2007 to join RDP. In September 2010, Limbo and 8 other opposition politicians were sworn-in as members of the National Assembly following a six-month boycott due to electoral irregularities in the 2009 election.
