= Jan de Wet =

Namibian politician (1927–2011)

Johannes Marthinus (Jan, Jannie) de Wet (10 November 1927 – 13 February 2011) was a South African/Namibian politician and cattle farmer.

== Early life ==
Johannes Marthinus de Wet was born on November 10th, 1927, in Rouxville, South Africa. His childhood was split between South Africa and Namibia, moving back and forth with his family. His family were farmers and ranchers. His family was white South African and loosely considered Afrikaner, but he was labelled by others as a Boer.

From 1934 to 1940 he attended primary school in Outjo in Northern Namibia, and from 1941 to 1944, he went to Ficksburg High School in South Africa. From 1944 to 1947, he worked on farms in the Outjo district in Namibia, before later attending Stellenbosch University in South Africa for three years, studying for a bachelor's degree in Agricultural Science. After graduating he moved back to Outjo as a farmer.

== Politics ==
Jan De Wet entered politics as a member of the South African Parliament, from 1964 to 1970.

He was aligned with the South African National Party and joined parliament during a significant shift in South African governance in Namibia. At this time Namibia was being governed as ‘South West Africa’, and the government was seeking to legitimise and strengthen its mandate in the region. Reflecting this plan, in this period a system of Apartheid was soon constructed in Namibia. In 1968 the government started to implement the Odendaal plan, creating 10 Bantustans across Namibia. During de Wet's time as a minor MP, he maintained a low profile, but he was a participant in the construction of this Apartheid policy.

He then became the Commissioner General of Native Peoples of South West Africa, serving from 1970 to 1978 as an embedded figure in the Apartheid government.

In this position he administered and maintained the Bantustan systems in Namibia, and was thus central to the enforcement of Apartheid. The Namibian Bantustans were characterised by harsh restrictions on movement and a complex pass system. This pass system was tied to a system of abusive and exploitative contract labour. The contract labour system was administered jointly by the government and the South West African Native Labour Association (SWANLA). It was extremely unpopular, and tensions escalated in the early 1970s.

These tensions broke out in the 1971-72 Namibian contract workers strike. This strike started for a variety of reasons, but it was initially sparked by a statement made by Jan de Wet.

During an escalation of tensions in June 1971, a number of major churches in Namibia openly condemned Apartheid, stirring mass public unrest. In November De Wet responded to these churches with a series of rebukes and political attacks. This culminated in him making a controversial public statement defending Apartheid, arguing that the contract labour system could not be compared to slavery. He also made a series of comments around Apartheid more broadly, taking a tone reminiscent of a white supremacist ‘civilising mission’ rhetoric.

In response to his statements, unrest erupted across Namibia and more than 25,000 people went on strike. This strike is infamous as a milestone in the Namibian independence movement. After the strike the armed struggle for independence escalated rapidly. The South West African Peoples Organisation (SWAPO) swelled in size significantly, strengthening its war effort.

This strike emerged in response to socio-economic tensions, but De Wets statement was important, and a reflection on his style of governance in the Bantustans. This style mirrored the style of the core leadership of the National Party, which was for a long time inspired by the political philosophy of Baasskap. This philosophy prioritised white economic domination and held that the system of Apartheid should keep black workers integrated into the economy in ways that strengthened white power in society. Governments holding this ideology implemented significant pass law legislation throughout society and importantly reinforced the contract labour system in Namibia.

In the late 1970s the conflict in Namibia escalated to a point where the South African government temporarily drew back some of its government apparatus, relocating them to South Africa. While working in South Africa, De Wet was amongst officials who met then rebel organization South West Africa People's Organization (SWAPO) in Geneva, Switzerland. These meetings were important for the legitimacy of SWAPO, but generally unproductive in reaching a political settlement. De Wet held a particularly cynical view of these talks and their efficacy, as after the talks the war soon escalated again. He was caught up in a significant ambush near Walvis Bay. He later remembered ‘My pickup was shot at 14 times’.

Following the Turnhalle Constitutional Conference and the possibility of Namibian independence, he left South African politics and entered White Namibian politics with the Action Christian National (ACN). De Wet was a member of the Transitional Government of National Unity from 1985 until independence in 1989. He chaired that body from August 1987 until January 1988. Following the 1989 democratic election, de Wet was selected to represent the ACN in the Constituent Assembly of Namibia (1989–90) and 1st National Assembly (1990–94).

In Namibian public memory, his time in the Namibian government after 1985 has been considered more important than his actions during Apartheid. De Wet is frequently praised for his role in reconciliation and the stabilisation of the new Namibian state.

Importantly, during his time in government between 1964 and 1978, there was a major shift in international perspectives on Namibian politics. In 1966 the United Nations general assembly revoked the South African mandate in Namibia, and advised the government to facilitate Namibian independence. In 1971 in an advisory opinion in the International Court of Justice, South African presence in Namibia was affirmed as a breach of international law. Alongside these rulings in 1973 the UN general assembly created the Apartheid Convention, and asserted the concept of the crime of apartheid in international law.

De Wets opinions on this matter are notably vague. While he didn’t speak on this during his time in the Apartheid government, in 2007 he affirmed that he felt his actions were correct, and justifiable. He asserted that he was a South African citizen and enacted the policy of the South African government.

== Personal life ==
Jan married his wife Lesinda in 1952. They had four daughters and a son together.

The couple took up farming in the Outjo district, and from 1956 to 1990 they lived on the Ryneveld farm. In the late 1970s and through the 1980s, during a major escalation in the war of independence, Jan and his family left Northern Namibia. They spent much of this time with the government in Walvis Bay and parts of southern Namibia, and at points moved to South Africa proper. After 1990 they moved southeast to near Leonardville in the Eastern Omaheke Region, and set up on the De Jager Farm.

De Wet was primarily a Brahman cattle farmer and was significant in the promotion of the Brahman breed in Namibia. Throughout the 1990s and 2000s he appeared as a judge of the Brahman breed at agricultural shows. The Brahman breed is a pillar of the modern commercial beef industry in Namibia, and its introduction has facilitated a small agricultural revolution. This has had complicated economic and social impacts.

Throughout much of his life De Wet self-identified as a South African patriot, and during the Apartheid era lived in ‘South West Africa’ as a white South African citizen under the South African mandate in Namibia. After Namibian independence, he became a Namibian citizen and self-identified as a Namibian patriot. He was an important supporter of the new constitution of Namibia, and his adoption of the label ‘White Namibian’ reflected this.

== Land Reform ==
Later in his life, De Wet was crucial in political discourses around land reform. He was a very important figure in agricultural circles in Leonardville and had a significant pacifying influence on local communities, acting as a mediator. As head of the Namibian Agricultural Union from 1994 to 2004, Wet worked with the Namibian government concerning the country's land reform processes, questioning criteria and methods of redistribution.

== Death ==
In late 2010 De Wet was diagnosed with cancer. In early 2011 he was moved to Windhoek, where he died on Sunday the 13^{th} of February 2011. He was 83 years old. He was survived by his wife Lesinda, 4 daughters and 13 grandchildren.

== See also ==
- 1971-72 Namibian contract workers strike § Immediate
- History of Namibia
