= Joel Kaapanda =

Namibian politician

The Honourable Joel Kaapanda

Minister of Information and Communication Technology
- In office 2008–2015
- President: Hifikepunye Pohamba
- Prime Minister: Nahas Angula; Hage Geingob
- Preceded by: Netumbo Nandi-Ndaitwah
- Succeeded by: Tjekero Tweya

Minister of Public Works, Transport and Communication
- In office 2005–2008
- President: Hifikepunye Pohamba
- Prime Minister: Nahas Angula
- Preceded by: Moses Amweelo
- Succeeded by: Helmut Angula

Minister of Regional and Local Government, Housing and Rural Development
- In office 2002–2005
- President: Sam Nujoma
- Prime Minister: Theo-Ben Gurirab
- Preceded by: Nickey Iyambo
- Succeeded by: John Pandeni

Personal details
- Born: 12 June 1945 (age 80) Ondukuta, Ovamboland, South West Africa (today Omusati Region, Namibia)
- Party: SWAPO
- Occupation: Politician
- Profession: Teacher, electrician

Joel Natangwe Kaapanda (born 12 June 1945) is a Namibian diplomat and politician. A member of the South West Africa People's Organization (SWAPO), Kaapanda was Namibia's first High Commissioner to India from 1995 to 2002 before becoming member of parliament, and subsequently minister.

== Early life and education ==
Kaapanda was born on 12 June 1945 in Ondukuta in the Ovamboland of South West Africa, today the Omusati Region of Namibia. In the 1970s, Kaapanda began his career as a primary school teacher in the Omusati Region. He also attended the Paulinum Theological Seminary in Otjimbingwe between 1976 and 1978, and then became a political officer in the People's Liberation Army of Namibia (PLAN). In 1981 he went into German exile in Hamburg to become an electrician. From 1981 to 1986, Kaapanda was the leader of SWAPO students in Hamburg.

After independence of Namibia in 1990, Kaapanda obtained academic degrees abroad, first a B.A. (1992) and a B.A. (Honours) in politics (1993) from University of Adelaide, Australia, then a postgraduate diploma in human resources (1998) from Indira Gandhi National Open University and a M.A. in political science (2000) from University of Delhi.

== Career ==
In 1987 Kaapanda became SWAPO chief representative in Australia. From 1994 to 1995 he worked as general manager at Okahuro Fisheries before becoming Namibia's first High Commissioner to India in 1995. He served until September 2002 when then-president Sam Nujoma appointed him minister of regional and local government, housing and rural development. Kaapanda entered the National Assembly of Namibia as non-voting member in November 2002.

In 2005 Kaapanda became a voting member of the National Assembly after placing 7th on the SWAPO list. He was shifted to the Ministry of Public Works, Transport and Communication which he headed until 2008, and then to the Ministry of Information and Communication Technology, where he was minister until March 2015.

Kaapanda was not placed high enough in the SWAPO party list for the 2014 parliamentary election but entered parliament for a further short stint from January to March 2020.

== Awards and recognition ==
On Heroes' Day 2014 he was conferred the Most Brilliant Order of the Sun, Second Class.
