= Mac Hengari =

Namibian politician

Mac-Albert Hengari is a Namibian politician. He was Namibia's Minister of Agriculture, Fisheries, Water and Land Reform from 21 March to 23 April 2025.

Hengari entered Parliament of Namibia in March 2025 as one of eight non-voting appointees of president Netumbo Nandi-Ndaitwah. He was appointed Minister of Agriculture, Fisheries, Water and Land Reform, described as "one of the country’s most powerful minist[ries]". A few weeks into his term reports surfaced that he is under investigation for allegedly raping a minor between 2019 and 2024. He was fired from his ministerial post on 23 April. On 26 April 2025 he was arrested for bribery when he tried to pay a lump sum for the alleged victim to withdraw the charges.

Inge Zaamwani-Kamwi replaced him as agriculture minister on 7 May 2025. She also took his seat in parliament.
