= Heiko Lucks =

Namibian politician

Heiko Lucks is a Namibian politician. A member of the Rally for Democracy and Progress, Lucks was elected to the National Assembly of Namibia in the 2009 general election.

In September 2010, Lucks and eight other opposition politicians were sworn in as members of the National Assembly following a six-month boycott due to electoral irregularities in the 2009 election.
