= White Namibians =

Ethnic group in Namibia

Blanke Namibiërs, Wit Namibiërs Weiße Namibier

Regions with significant populations
- Namibia: 53,773 (2023 Census)

Languages
- First language Afrikaans (60%); German (32%); English (7%); Portuguese (1%)

Religion
- Predominantly Christian: (Lutheranism; Anglicanism; Roman Catholicism; Seventh-day Adventism); Judaism

Related ethnic groups
- White South Africans, White Zimbabweans, Afrikaners, Coloureds, Basters, other White Africans

White Namibians (German: Weiße Namibier or Europäische Namibier) are people of European descent settled in Namibia. The majority of White Namibians are Dutch-descended Afrikaners (locally born or of White South African descent), with a minority being native-born German Namibians (descended from Germans who colonised Namibia in the late-nineteenth century). There are also some Portuguese and English immigrants. 53,773 Namibians identified as White in 2023.

== Demographics and distribution ==
53,773 Namibians identified as White in the 2023 census, representing 1.8% of the population of Namibia. Other estimates differ. The City of Windhoek estimates their number to be 75,000.

The vast majority of White Namibians live in major cities and towns in central or southern Namibia. Windhoek has by far the largest White population, and Whites are a majority in the coastal city of Swakopmund. Other coastal cities, such as Walvis Bay, Henties bay and Lüderitz, also have large White communities. In general, most of Namibia south of Windhoek has a high proportion of Whites, while central Namibia has a high concentration of Blacks. Apart from Windhoek, coastal areas and Southern Namibia, there are large White communities in Otjiwarongo and towns in the Otavi Triangle, such as Tsumeb and Grootfontein. The 1981 census of the Republic of South Africa reported a White population of 76,430 in Namibia (71% Afrikaners and 17% German-speaking).

== History ==
The first European to land in Namibia was Portuguese explorer Diogo Cão.

Portuguese mariner and explorer Bartolomeu Dias reached Namibia in 1487. Europeans had no interest in Namibia until the 19th century because there was a desert along the country’s coast.

German colonists killed tens of thousands of indigenous African tribes in Namibia between 1904 and 1908 during the Herero and Nama genocide due to white supremacy and belief in racial superiority.

== Economics ==
According to the FAO, around 42% of arable land was owned by Whites at the time of independence in 1990. While the area was known as South West Africa, White Namibians enjoyed a highly privileged position due to apartheid laws enforcing strict segregation.

=== Politicians ===
- Leon Jooste, Minister of Public Enterprises
- Anton Lubowski, political activist
- Dirk Mudge, Chairman of the Turnhalle Constitutional Conference
- Henk Mudge, Member of Parliament
- Kosie Pretorius, Member of Parliament
- Hanno Rumpf, government minister and ambassador
- Hans-Erik Staby, Member of Parliament
- Jan de Wet, Member of Parliament
- Piet van der Walt, Deputy Minister of National Planning
- Calle Schlettwein, Minister of Agriculture, Water and Land Reform
- Nico Smit, Member of Parliament

=== Businessmen ===
- Harold Pupkewitz

=== Sportspeople ===
- Skipper Badenhorst
- Quinton-Steele Botes
- Renaldo Bothma
- Jacques Burger
- Dan Craven
- Monica Dahl
- Trevor Dodds
- Jörg Lindemeier
- Percy Montgomery
- Oliver Risser
- Friedhelm Sack
- Manfred Starke
- Ian van Zyl

=== Journalists ===
- Gwen Lister
- Hannes Smith

=== Farmers ===
- Raimar von Hase
- Rudi and Marlice van Vuuren

=== Engineers ===
- Japie van Zyl

=== Artists ===
- Tim Huebschle, film director and screenwriter
- Adolph Jentsch, painter
- Richard Pakleppa, film director and screenwriter
- EES (Eric Sell), singer, songwriter and entrepreneur
- Max Siedentopf, artist and film director

=== Fashion models ===
- Michelle McLean
- Behati Prinsloo
- Chanique Rabe

== Population chart ==
White population of Namibia, 1965–2023 (estimated)
Government	Year	White population	Total population	White in percent
German South West Africa (1884–1915)	1913	14,830	200,000*	7%
South West Africa, South African administration (1915–1990)	1918	13,400	195,000*	7%
South West Africa, South African administration (1915–1990)	1919	6,700	205,000*	3%
South West Africa, South African administration (1915–1990)	1921	19,432	228,910	8%
South West Africa, South African administration (1915–1990)	1933	10,000	290,000*	3%
South West Africa, South African administration (1915–1990)	1958	66,000	561,854	12%
South West Africa, South African administration (1915–1990)	1965	68,000	670,981	10%
South West Africa, South African administration (1915–1990)	1981	76,430	1,033,196	7%
Republic of Namibia (1990–)	2023	53,773	3,022,401	2%

== See also ==
- German Namibians
- Monitor Action Group
- Republican Party
- Demographics of Namibia
- History of the Jews in Namibia
- German South West Africa – Colony of the German Empire
