= Tsudao Gurirab =

Namibian politician

Tsudao Immanuel Gurirab (born 2 January 1961) is a Namibian politician. A member of Congress of Democrats (CoD), Gurirab was previously a member of the ruling South West Africa People's Organization (SWAPO) until he alongside Ben Ulenga, Ignatius Shixwameni and others left SWAPO to form CoD in 1999. He was also a member of the Pan-African Parliament and the only non-SWAPO member selected from Namibia. In 2007, Gurirab was elected chairperson of the party.

== Education ==
Gurirab went into exile with SWAPO and earned a diploma from the United Nations Institute for Namibia in Lusaka, Zambia in 1982, B.A. in economics from the University of Sussex in 1984 and a M.A. in Development Studies from the University of Manchester in 1986. In 2002, Gurirab earned a M.A. in Public Policy and Administration from the University of Namibia/Institute of Social Sciences in The Hague, Netherlands.

== Political career ==
Gurirab joined the SWAPO Department of Economic Affairs as a researcher in Luanda, Angola from 1987 to 1988. Following the end of the Namibian War of Independence, Gurirab worked on the editorial board of the SWAPO newspaper Namibia Today as well as on the party's election team in 1989. From independence in 1990 until 1995, the Usakos native was the permanent secretary in the Ministry of Trade and Industry when Ben Amathila was Minister. He left politics in 1995 and worked as a private economist. Gurirab joined some prominent SWAPO figures and joined CoD in 1999. In the 1999 election, the new party earned 7 out of 72 seats, tying it with the Democratic Turnhalle Alliance (DTA) for second most seats in the National Assembly of Namibia and a seat for Gurirab. Gurirab maintained that seat in the 2004 election as number three on CoD's electoral list for the Assembly, despite a net loss of two seats for CoD. Gurirab was not re-elected in the 2009 general election, as only CoD leader Ben Ulenga was re-elected.

== Business ==
Gurirab, an economist by training, is the director of Tulajo Financial Holdings, a financial services company. He also owns 17,118 preference shares and 25,033 ordinary shares in First National Bank Holdings.
