= Stanley Simataa =

Namibian politician

Stanley Mutumba Simataa
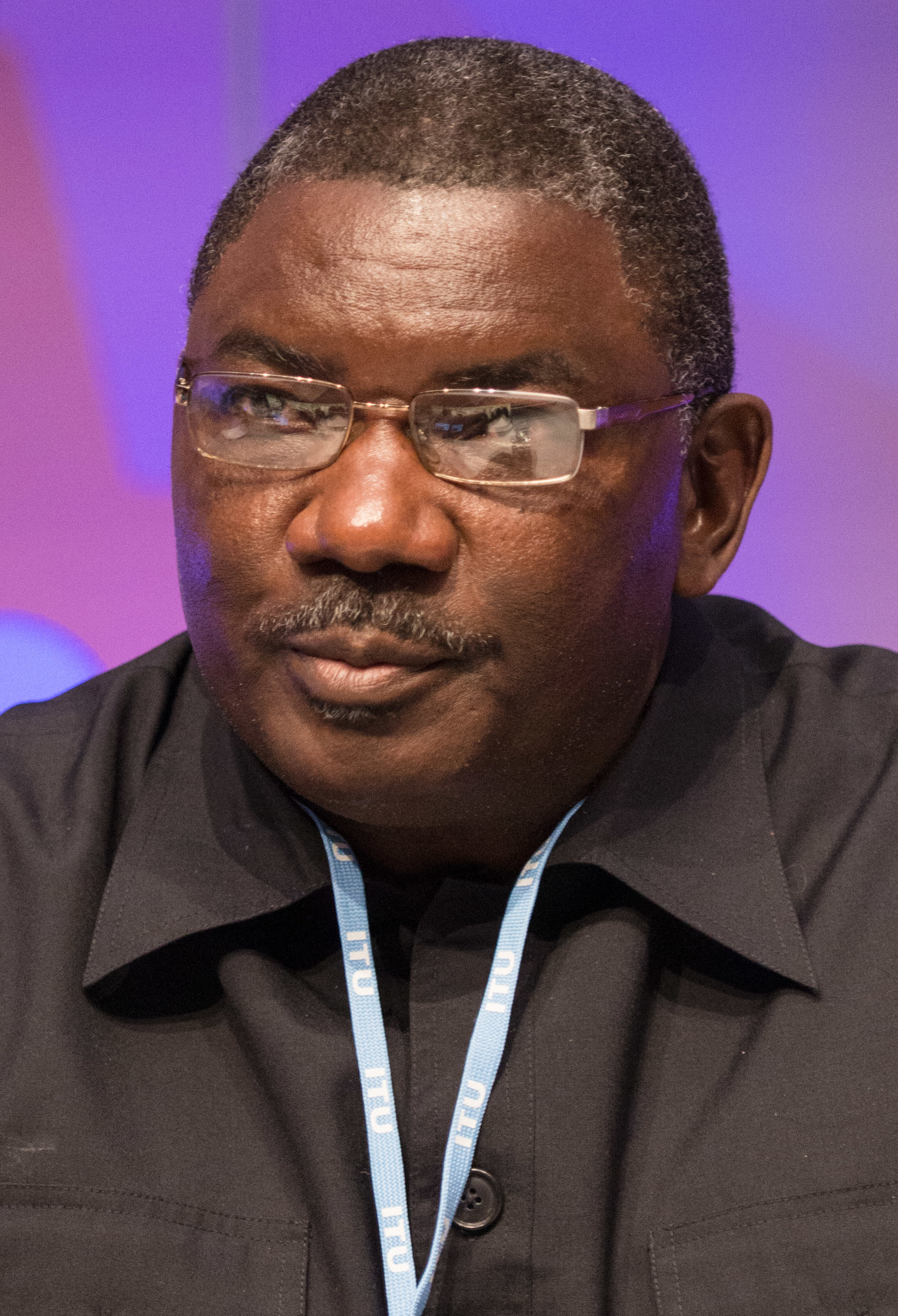

Minister of Information and Communication Technology
- In office February 2018 – March 2020
- President: Hage Geingob
- Preceded by: Tjekero Tweya
- Succeeded by: Peya Mushelenga

Deputy Minister of Information and Communication Technology
- In office March 2010 – February 2018
- President: Hifikepunye Pohamba; Hage Geingob

Personal details
- Born: June 5, 1960 (age 65) Sikanjambuka, South West Africa
- Party: SWAPO
- Occupation: Teacher

Stanley Mutumba Simataa (born 5 June 1960) is a Namibian politician and former minister of information and communication technology. He served as deputy minister for information from 2010 until his appointment as minister in 2018.

Simataa was born on 5 June 1960 in Sikanjambuka in the Caprivi Strip (today Zambezi Region). He obtained a Bachelor in agricultural pedagogy from the University of Limpopo, South Africa, and an MSc in agricultural education from the University of Reading, United Kingdom. Simataa also holds an MBA from the Eastern and Southern African Management Institute in Tanzania. In Namibia, Simataa served as executive director of the National Council for Higher Education (NCHE) (2007–10), deputy permanent secretary in the Ministry of Education, and as director in the Speaker's Office of the National Assembly.

Simataa became a SWAPO member of parliament in 2010 and was immediately appointed deputy Minister of Information and Communication Technology. He served in that position until 2018 when he was promoted to minister. He also served as president of the 38th session of the general conference of UNESCO in 2015.

During his time as minister, he has spoken about the need to improve Namibia's communications infrastructure. In 2018 he promoted a project to bring mobile telecommunications coverage to rural parts of Namibia.

In 2018 he complained that government agencies were undermining the improvement of transparency by not publishing up to date procurement information on their websites. The Editors' Forum of Namibia have criticised Simataa for a lack of commitment to the forum's Code of Ethics and Conduct. In May 2018, Simataa rejected a report by IPPR which stated that government monopolies were one of the leading causes of corruption in Namibia, calling the report 'prejudiced'.

When he was not reappointed into cabinet in March 2020 he also resigned his seat in parliament.
