= Raimar von Hase =

Namibian farmer (born 1948)

- Born: March 12, 1948 (age 77)
- Occupation: Farmer
- Years active: 1975–present

Raimar von Hase (born 12 March 1948) is a Namibian farmer.

== Career ==
Raimar von Hase began farming in 1975. He previously owned land in the Hardap Region near Uhlenhorst, where he bred Karakul sheep, and other animal husbandry. This land was sold to the Namibian government in 2013. von Hase was the leader of the Namibia Agricultural Union, which represents Namibia's farmers nationally, from 2004 to 2012. He replaced Jan de Wet, who had previously served since 1994. As leader of the NAU, von Hase adopted a conciliatory approach to national land reform, welcoming constitutional reforms. von Hase has also served as an honorary financial advisor to Namibian President Hage Geingob.
