= Derek Klazen =

Namibian politician

The Honourable Derek Klazen

Minister of Fisheries
- In office 21 April 2021 – 25 March 2025
- President: Hage Geingob
- Prime Minister: Saara Kuugongelwa-Amadhila
- Preceded by: Albert Kawana

Deputy minister of Urban and Rural Development
- In office 21 March 2015 – 21 April 2021
- President: Hage Geingob
- Prime Minister: Saara Kuugongelwa-Amadhila

Personal details
- Born: 31 May 1965 (age 61) Walvis Bay, South Africa (now Namibia)
- Education: Windhoek College of Education
- Occupation: Politician
- Profession: Teacher

Derek James Klazen (born 31 May 1965 in Walvis Bay) is a Namibian politician and businessman. A member of SWAPO, he was Namibia's Minister of Fisheries from 21 April 2021 to 21 March 2025.

Klazen was born on 31 May 1965 in Walvis Bay, then an exclave of South Africa. He attended De Duine Secondary School until 1984 and then the Khomas Teachers College from 1985 to 1987, graduating with a diploma in education. In 1994 he obtained a higher diploma in education from Windhoek College of Education.

Klazen is a SWAPO member and was a council member of Walvis Bay between 2004 and 2014, serving as mayor between 2006 and 2008, as well as in 2010. In the 2014 parliamentary election he was elected to parliament and immediately appointed deputy minister of Urban and Rural Development. He served until April 2021 when he was promoted to minister and given the portfolio of fisheries and marine resources.

Klazen was until 2021 board member and shareholder of KKNU Holdings, a fishing company in Walvis Bay. He resigned his board membership and sold his 25% when he became minister of fisheries.
