= Steve Bezuidenhout =

Namibian politician (born 1957)

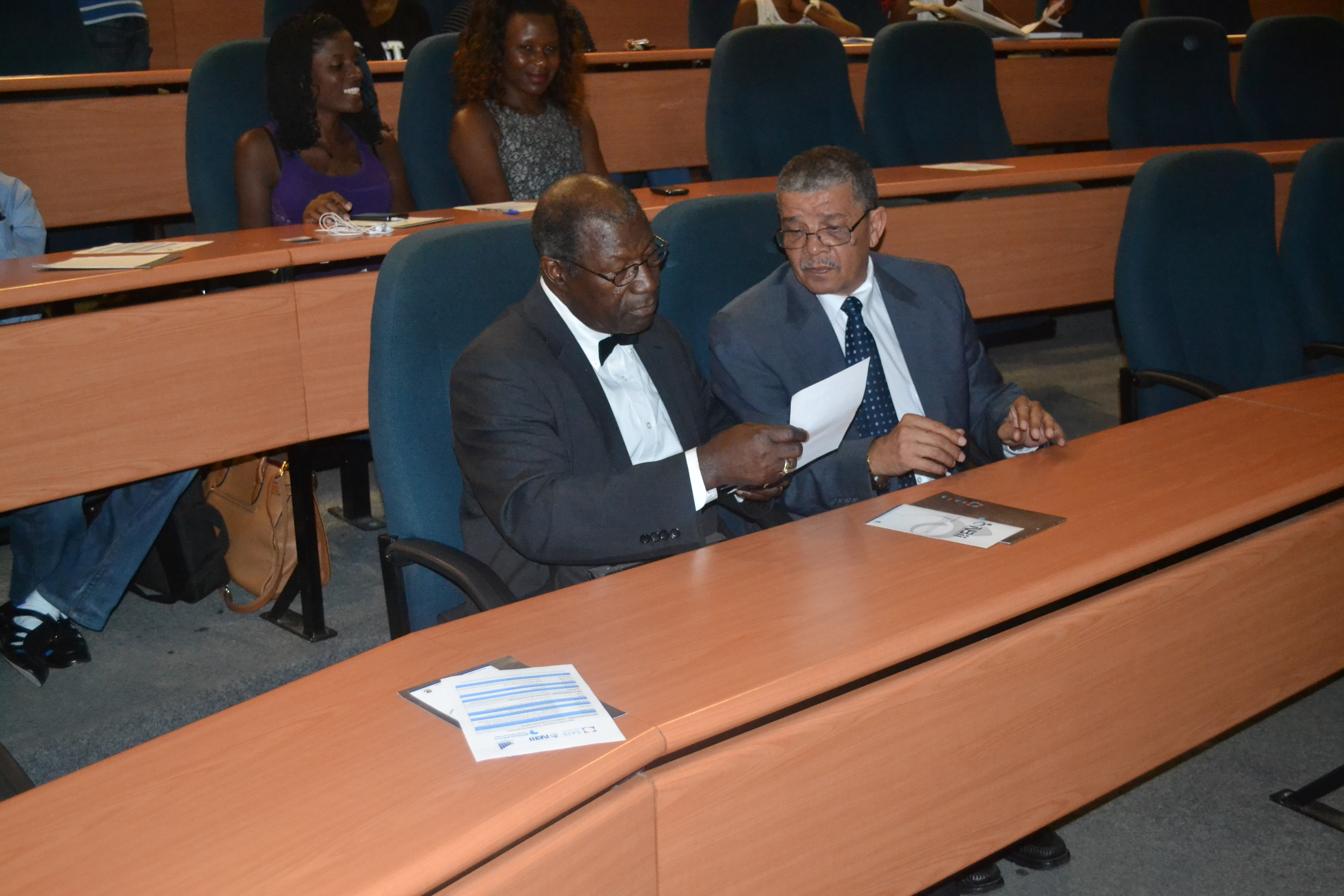
Steven Bezuidenhout (right) and Moses Amweelo

Steve Bezuidenhout (born 3 June 1957 in Keetmanshoop, ǁKaras Region) is a Namibian politician. A Coloured Namibian, Bezuidenhout is the Interim President of the Rally for Democracy and Progress (RDP). He joined SWAPO in 1989 and was active until he left to help form the RDP. He was elected to the National Assembly of Namibia as an RDP candidate in the 2009 general election.

In September 2010, Bezuidenhout and eight other opposition politicians were sworn in as members of the National Assembly following a six-month boycott due to electoral irregularities in the 2009 election.
