= Land reform in Namibia =

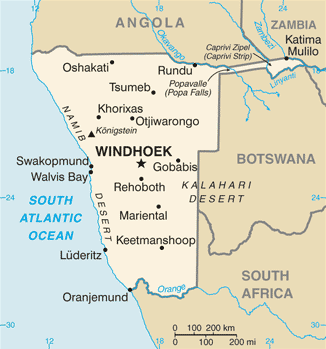
Map of Namibia

Land reform is an important political and economic topic in Namibia. It consists of two different strategies: resettlement, and transfer of commercially viable agricultural land. Resettlement is aimed at improving the lives of displaced or dispossessed previously disadvantaged Namibians. Farms obtained by government for resettlement purposes are usually split into several sections, and dozens of families are being resettled on what had previously been one farm. Transfer of commercial agricultural land is not directly conducted by government. Would-be farmers with a previously disadvantaged background obtain farms privately or through affirmative action loans. In both cases, the "Willing buyer, willing seller" principle applies.

Namibia contains about 4,000 commercial farms. Almost 1000 of them have been obtained by previously disadvantaged Namibians since independence, some by means of private transactions, and some through government-facilitated loans. Until 2020, a further 15 Mio hectares of commercial agricultural land are to be transferred to blacks, a third of this area for resettlement purposes, two thirds for agriculture.

== Background ==
Land ownership in pre-colonial central and southern South West Africa was intermittent; Herero people and Nama people claimed the land they were currently using. Heinrich Vedder writes:

As the Nama said: Where the foot of our hunter sets there is Namaland, so said the Herero: wherever my cattle grassed there is Hereroland.

The notion of permanent ownership of land in the territory of South West Africa was only introduced in the wake of colonialisation. Consequently, the dispossession of land by European settlers from Africans began in the nineteenth century with the coming of German colonists and traders as the area was incorporated as German South West Africa.

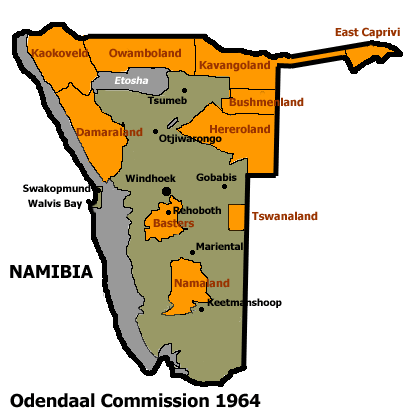
Allocation of land to bantustans according to the Odendaal Plan.

During South African occupation of the territory, Namibia was divided along ethnic lines. 10 bantustans were established, the remaining territory, including much of the agriculturally viable land, was reserved for Whites. In the bantustans farm land was communal whereas the farms outside were in private hands. When Namibia gained independence in March 1990, the country inherited this division of land in which 3,500 farmers, who were almost entirely Whites, owned approximately 50% of the country's agricultural land. These farmers constituted about 0.2% of the total national population. Land reform was one of the biggest goals for many who participated in Namibia's liberation struggle.

Government statistics show that white farmers own about 70% of the country's farmland. A total of 53,773 Namibians identified as white in the 2023 census, representing 1.8% of the country's population.

== Reform Strategies ==
Prior to the first democratic election in 1989, liberation movement leader SWAPO committed itself to "transfer[ing] some of the land from the few with too much of it to the landless majority".

Namibia's land reform process is based on three strategies, outlined by the Agricultural (Commercial) Land Reform Act of 1995:

1. Resettlement: The Namibian government buys farms from commercial farmers allocates them to previously disadvantaged people.
2. Loans: AgriBank, a state-owned bank, grants loans with interests below market level to the previously disadvantaged population.
3. Communal land: Communal land, which all belongs to the state, is parcelled into small units and distributed by traditional leaders.

=== Resettlement ===
Farms obtained by government for resettlement purposes are usually split into several sections, and dozens of families are being resettled on what had previously been one farm. From 1990 to 2007, an independent report said that the government had resettled approximately 800 Black farmers on land bought for redistribution. It was approximately 12% of commercial farmland in the country, or less than 1% per year.

Namibian citizens may obtain a portion of a farm for resettlement if they do not yet own farm land, and if they belong to the previously disadvantaged population. In the allocation process, females score higher than males, people 25 years of age or older score higher than those below 25, and people with farming experience score higher than those without.

== Willing buyer, willing seller ==
The government generally has avoided expropriating farms. Farms to be reallocated to previously disadvantaged people are mainly bought from farm owners that wish to sell their farms. This is called the Willing buyer, willing seller principle. Any farm that is to be sold on the free market must first be offered to government. However, in 2005, government began expropriating commercial farms. Although only five farms had been expropriated in 2008, and a further 30 farm owners had received letters asking them to sell to government, this move has instilled fears in the white farming community and discouraged further investment.

== Taxation ==
In 2004 a land value tax on commercial farmland was introduced as part of the post-independence land reform agenda. The tax rate was designed to discourage ownership of multiple farms with the tax rate increasing as the number of properties owned increased. By statute every owner of commercial agricultural land must pay a rate based on the unimproved site value (USV) of the land. The revenue generated from the land tax is earmarked for the Land Acquisition and Development Fund, that is, primarily for land reform purposes.

The government aims to influence the market by imposing higher tax rates on large or excessive landholdings or on farmland that is not being used. The land tax rates are progressive, the rationale being that individuals will give up some of their land plots because they cannot afford to pay the tax, as well as to raise much-needed revenue to buy more commercial agricultural land for the resettlement program.

The government invested considerable effort in consultation with key stakeholders including white farmers, and succeeded in securing their general agreement. Because of this process, the introduction of the land tax in Namibia has been described as a success with implications for other countries wishing to undertake land reform.

== See also ==
- Namibia Agricultural Union, which represents Namibia's commercial farmers
- Affirmative Repositioning, a movement to obtain urban land for youth
