= Brian Gurirab =

Namibian footballer

Personal information
- Date of birth: 28 October 1984 (age 42)
- Place of birth: Khorixas, South West Africa
- Height: 1.80 m (5 ft 11 in)
- Position: Midfielder

Senior career*
Years	Team	Apps	(Gls)
2002–2005	Chief Santos		
2005–2007	Civics		
2008–2009	Primeiro de Maio		
2010–2017	Orlando Pirates Windhoek		

International career
2004–2007	Namibia	5	(1)
- * Club domestic league appearances and goals

Brian Gurirab (born 28 October 1984) is a Namibian former footballer who played as a midfielder.
