= Björgólfur Jóhannsson =

Icelandic business executive

Björgólfur Jóhannsson (born in Iceland on August 28, 1955) is an Icelandic business executive, former president and CEO of Icelandair Group, the holding company of Icelandair, the flag carrier of Iceland. Björgólfur resigned as the Company's President & CEO on 27 August 2018 and Bogi Nils Bogason, the Company's CFO, became interim President & CEO of the Company Björgólfur was also the chairman of the board of the Confederation of Icelandic Employers but stepped down On 7 March 2017

== Biography ==
Björgólfur comes from Grenivík in the north of Iceland, close to Akureyri. He graduated with a degree in Business Administration from the University of Iceland in 1983 and became a Chartered Accountant in 1985. From 1980 to 1992 he worked for accountancy firms in Akureyri.

In 1992 Björgólfur became Chief Financial Officer of the fisheries company Útgerðarfélag Akureyringa hf, but in 1996 moved to the powerful Samherji fisheries company, also based in Akureyri, where he became Director of Innovation and Development. In 1999 Björgólfur became Chief Executive Officer of yet another fisheries company, Síldarvinnslan. Then in 2006 he was chosen as the new CEO of Icelandic Group, a global sales and marketing company for frozen fish products.

From 2003 to 2008 Björgólfur was also the president of The Federation of Icelandic Fishing Vessel Owners (LIU), a very powerful position in Iceland. In May 2008 he became CEO of Icelandair Group.

The 2008–2012 Icelandic financial crisis proved a great challenge for Björgólfur and his staff but after a financial reconstruction of the company, completed in 2011, he insisted the future looks bright, as the rise in tourism in Iceland bodes well for the company.

On 6 March 2013 Björgólfur was elected the Chairman of the Board of the SA, the Confederation of Icelandic Employers, a very influential position in Iceland. He received 98,5 percent of the votes. On 4 April 2014 Björgólfur was re-elected.

As chairman of the SA, Björgólfur took an active part in negotiations with the ASÍ, the Icelandic Federation of Labour, in December 2013, resulting in attempts to maintain the fragile economic stability of post-crash Iceland. In April 2014 both SA and ASÍ joined forces with other important players in the Icelandic economic arena in presenting a comprehensive report of the Icelandic Institute of International Affairs about the state of Iceland's accession negotiations with the EU.

On 14 November, following the bribery scandal allegations in the Fishrot Files, the board of Samherji announced that Þorsteinn Már Baldvinsson had temporary stepped aside as CEO and would be replaced by Björgólfur while the company conducted an internal investigation on the allegations.

== Personal life ==
Björgólfur is married to teacher Málfríður Pálsdóttir and they have two daughters born in 1990–91 and two grandchild's.

== Awards ==
In December 2012 both the Viðskiptablaðið, the Icelandic business weekly, and Fréttablaðið, Iceland's leading newspaper, chose Björgólfur as their "Businessman of the Year" for 2012.
