= Helmut Angula =

Namibian politician

The Honourable Helmut Angula

Minister of Works and Transport
- In office 2008–2010
- Preceded by: Joel Kaapanda
- Succeeded by: Erkki Nghimtina

Director-general of the National Planning Commission
- In office 2005–2008

Minister of Agriculture, Water and Rural Development
- In office 1996–2005
- Preceded by: Nangolo Mbumba
- Succeeded by: Nickey Iyambo

Minister of Finance
- In office 1995–1996
- Preceded by: Gert Hanekom
- Succeeded by: Nangolo Mbumba

Minister of Fisheries and Marine Resources
- In office 1991–1995
- Preceded by: position established
- Succeeded by: Hifikepunye Pohamba

Deputy minister of Mines and Energy
- In office 1990–1991
- Preceded by: position established

Personal details
- Born: 11 November 1945 (age 80) South West Africa
- Party: SWAPO
- Education: Voronezh State University

Helmut Pau Kangulohi Angula (born 11 November 1945) is a Namibian businessman, politician, former cabinet minister and writer. He is currently the director of various private companies after leaving government in 2010 and a longtime member of the central committee and the politburo of the ruling SWAPO party.

== Biography ==
Angula was born in Ontananga, Oshikoto Region, and joined SWAPO in 1963, just three years after the movement's founding. Angula holds an M.Sc Degree from Voronezh State University in the USSR. During his time with SWAPO, Angula served as the deputy principal of the Health and Education Center in Nyango, Zambia, from 1975 to 1976 and then rose to director of the center until 1977. From 1977 to 1986, he was SWAPO's chief representative to Cuba, the Caribbean, and Latin America, and from 1986 to 1989, he served as the SWAPO's permanent observer at the United Nations in New York and as the chief representative to North America.

He was elected to the National Assembly of Namibia in 1990. He was deputy minister of Mines and Energy from 1990 to 1991, Minister of Fisheries and Marine Resources from 1991 to 1995, Minister of Finance from 1995 to 1996, and Minister of Agriculture, Water and Rural Development from 1996 to 2004. In 2005, Angula was appointed director-general of the National Planning Commission, where he was responsible for negotiating the Namibia- US Millennium Challenge Account Agreement worth $380 million US and supported programs implemented by US/Namibian Governments in the education, environment, and agricultural sectors. He was also responsible for negotiating with the World Bank and the Education and Training Sector Improvement Programs "ETSIP" Agreement.

A vacancy on the SWAPO list in November 2007 opened up a seat in the National Assembly, and Angula was subsequently sworn in as a Member of Parliament again at the beginning of a parliamentary session on 22 November 2007. In April 2008, he was appointed Minister of Works and Transport and held this position until March 2010. Since leaving the government, Angula has embarked on various business activities.

Angula is currently a member of SWAPO's central committee and politburo, and its secretary for the Department of Transportation.

Angula was not re-elected to the National Assembly in the November 2009 parliamentary election and instead pursued a business career. He is running a fishing company.

On Heroes' Day 2014, he was conferred the Most Brilliant Order of the Sun, Second Class.

== Writing ==
In 1988, he published "The Two Thousand Days of Haimbodi Ya Haufiku," an "autobiographical novel from Namibia." The novel was first published in German translation by Karl H. Heidtmann, based on the original English-language manuscript and reworked in collaboration with the author, an edition in the original English followed in 1990.

== Bibliography ==
- Angula, Helmut (1988). Die zweitausend Tage des Haimbodi ya Haufiku -autobiograph. Roman aus Namibia (in German). Bonn: Informationsstelle Südl. Afrika. ISBN 978-3-921614-18-1. OCLC 314048344..
- Angula, Helmut (1990). The two thousand days of Haimbodi ya Haufiku. Windhoek, Namibia: Gamsberg Macmillan. ISBN 978-0-86848-699-4. OCLC 27454272..
