= Festus Mbandeka =

Namibian lawyer and politician

Attorney General
- Appointed by: Netumbo Nandi-Ndaitwah

Personal details
- Occupation: Lawyer, Politician

Festus Katuna Mbandeka is a Namibian lawyer and politician who was appointed Namibia's attorney general in Hage Geingob's second term cabinet on March 21, 2020.

Mbandeka is a legal practitioner and was admitted to the profession by the High Court of Namibia in 1997. Prior to his government position, he was the CEO of Communications Regulatory Authority of Namibia from September 2015 to March 2020. In the past, he also worked for the Office of the Attorney General, sat on the board of directors of the Namibia Diamond Trading Company, and was the legal advisor for Namibia's tech-com giant Mobile Telecommunication Company (MTC).

In March 2025, he was reappointed to the position of Attorney General by Netumbo Nandi-Ndaitwah.
