= Namibia Agricultural Union =

- Namibia Landbou-Unie
- Abbreviation: NLU/NAU
- Established: 1947; 79 years ago
- Founded at: Otjiwarongo
- Type: Trade association
- Purpose: Agriculture
- Headquarters: Windhoek
- Region served: Namibia
- President: Thinus Pretorius
- VP: Gernot Eggert
- Executive Manager: Roelie Venter
- Secretariat: D. Brockman
- Main organ: NAU Congress
- Publication: AgriForum
- Subsidiaries: Regional Agricultural Unions (RAUs), local Farmers' Associations (FAs), Agricultural Employers' Association (AEA)
- Affiliations: Namibia Employers’ Federation (NEF)
- Website: www.nau.com.na
- Formerly called: South West African Agricultural Union (SWAAU)

The Namibia Agricultural Union is a union of farmers in Namibia which represents commercial or non-subsistence farmers. The president of the NAU is Piet Gouws. Previous presidents include Raimar von Hase and Jan de Wet. The NAU is part of the International Federation of Agricultural Producers, a global organization which advocates for farmers.

Paul Smit, a farmer from Otjozondjupa Region, played a prominent role in the Union from 1987-1997, holding the presidency of the Union from 1993-1997. He has since entered politics and, while officially "apolitical", served as the Deputy Minister of Agriculture in the SWAPO government.
