= Tjekero Tweya =

Namibian politician and trade unionist

The Honourable Tjekero Tweya MP
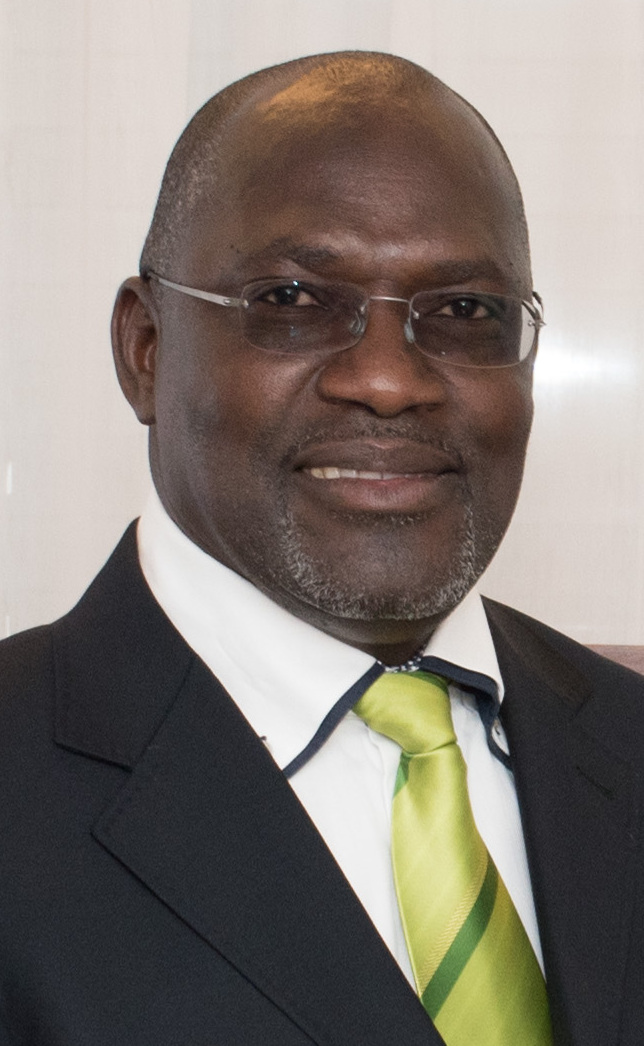

Minister of Industrialization, Trade and SME Development
- In office 2018–2020
- President: Hage Geingob
- Preceded by: Immanuel Ngatjizeko
- Succeeded by: Lucia Iipumbu

Minister of Information and Communication Technology
- In office 2015–2018
- President: Hage Geingob
- Preceded by: Joel Kaapanda
- Succeeded by: Stanley Simataa

Deputy Minister of Trade and Industry
- In office 2010–2015
- President: Hifikepunye Pohamba

Deputy Minister of Finance
- In office 2005–2010
- President: Hifikepunye Pohamba

Personal details
- Born: 18 June 1960 (age 66) Shamundambo, South West Africa (now Namibia)
- Party: SWAPO
- Education: University of Namibia; Management College of Southern Africa

Tjekero Tweya (born 18 June 1960 in Shamundambo, Okavango Region), is a Namibian politician and trade unionist. Tweya is a member of parliament for SWAPO. He served in the Cabinet of Namibia as Minister of Industrialization, Trade and SME Development and as Minister of Information and Communication Technology.

== Early life and education ==
Tweya obtained a Higher Education teaching diploma in 1988 and worked as teacher and principal between 1989 and 1992. He then moved to Windhoek and worked for the Ministry of Education until 1996. In 1997 he became human resources manager, first at TransNamib and then at Telecom Namibia.

Tweya completed a BEd (Honours) from the University of Namibia in 1993 and an MBA from the Management College of Southern Africa in 2012. He also holds certificates from the universities of Manchester and Harvard.

== Political career ==
Tweya joined SWAPO in 1975. In 1985, Tweya helped to found, and was chairperson of, the Namibia National Students Organisation (NANSO). He was the first chairman of the Namibia National Teachers Union (NANTU) between 1989 and 1991, and president of the National Union of Namibian Workers (NUNW), which is one of the national trade union centers of Namibia, between 1991 and 1993.

Tweya was appointed deputy Minister of Finance in 2005. In 2010 he was moved to deputise the Minister of Trade and Industry, and in 2015 he was promoted to Minister of Information and Communication Technology. In a cabinet reshuffle in February 2018 he became Minister of Industrialization, Trade and SME Development. He served until March 2020.
