= Mvula =

Family name

Mvula is a surname of Zambian origin that may refer to:

- Joyce Mvula (born 1994), Malawian netball player
- Laura Mvula (born 1986), British singer
- Wezzie Mvula, Malawian footballer
