= Gert Hanekom =

Namibian politician (1930–1999)

The Honourable Gert Hanekom

Minister of Environment and Tourism
- In office 1995–1997
- President: Sam Nujoma
- Preceded by: Niko Bessinger
- Succeeded by: Philemon Malima

Minister of Finance
- In office 1992–1995
- President: Sam Nujoma
- Preceded by: Otto Herrigel
- Succeeded by: Helmut Angula

Minister of Agriculture, Fisheries, Water and Rural Development
- In office 1990–1992
- President: Sam Nujoma
- Preceded by: position established
- Succeeded by: Anton von Wietersheim

Personal details
- Born: 30 March 1930 Redelinghuys, South Africa
- Died: 2 December 1999 (aged 69) Windhoek, Namibia
- Party: SWAPO
- Children: 3

Gerhardus Jacobus 'Gert' Hanekom (30 March 1930—2 December 1999), affectionately known as Oom Gert (Afrikaans: Uncle Gert), was a Namibian politician serving in several ministerial portfolios.

== Biography ==
Hanekom was born on 30 March 1930 in Redelinghuys in South Africa's Western Cape. He attended school there and graduated from the University of South Africa as a chartered accountant. He subsequently worked as accountant in the private sector. In 1956 he took up accounting work in Windhoek and founded Hanekom & Kie in 1975, an accounting company that developed into the local PricewaterhouseCoopers dependance.

Although initially a member of the Afrikaner nationalist National Party (NP), Hanekom disassociated with its apartheid policies over time. He and other NP members left and founded Action National Settlement in 1986, a party that later joined the National Patriotic Front. Hanekom worked with SWAPO shortly before Namibian independence and joined the party in 1990.

Hanekom joined the National Assembly in 1990 by appointment of president Sam Nujoma as Namibia's first Minister of Agriculture, Fisheries, Water and Rural Development. In 1992 he was moved to the finance portfolio, and in 1995 he became Minister of Environment and Tourism. He served until 1997 when he took over as head of the President's Economic Advisory Council.

Hanekom was ill with cancer and heart problems. He died on 2 December 1999 and was awarded a state funeral.
