= Rally for Democracy and Progress (Namibia) =

Political party in Namibia

- Abbreviation: RDP
- President: Mike Kavekotora
- Secretary-General: Brunhilde Cornelius
- Founder: Hidipo Hamutenya; Jesaya Nyamu
- Founded: 17 November 2007
- Split from: SWAPO
- Headquarters: Schönlein Street; Windhoek West; Windhoek; Khomas Region
- Newspaper: Voice of Change
- Youth Wing: RDP Youth League
- Women’s Wing: RDP Women’s League
- Ideology: Liberalism; African nationalism
- Political position: Centre-left
- Colors: Blue; Yellow; Green; Black
- Seats in the National Assembly: 1 / 104
- Seats in the National Council: 0 / 42
- Regional Councillors: 0 / 121
- Local Councillors: 16 / 378
- Pan-African Parliament: 0 / 5

Party flag
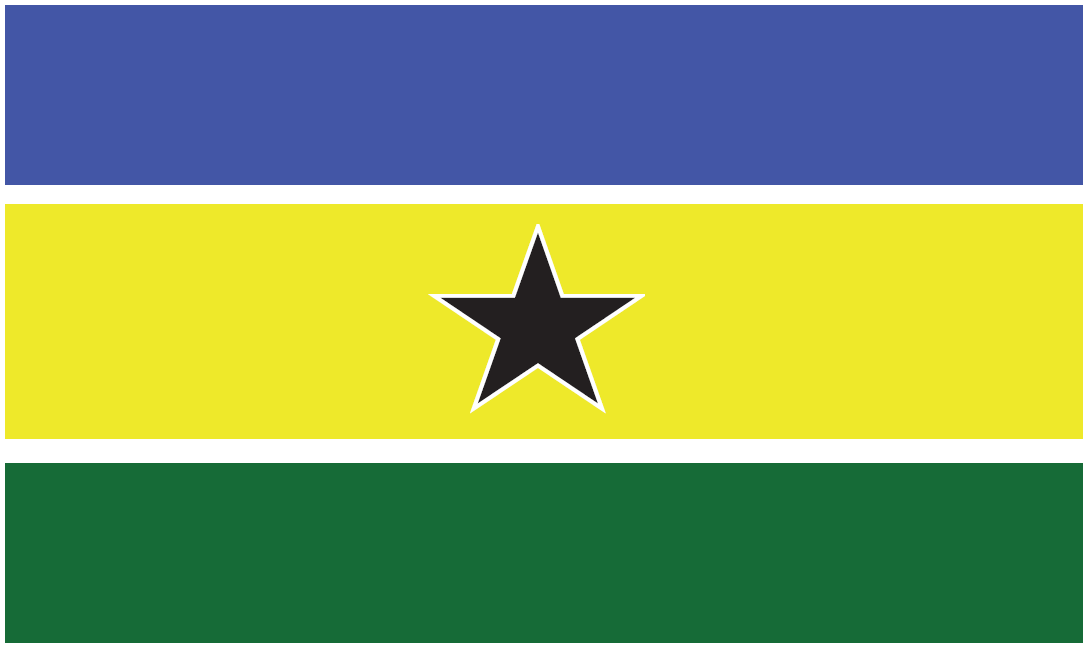

Website
- Website of RDP

The Rally for Democracy and Progress (RDP) is a political party in Namibia. It was launched on 17 November 2007 under the leadership of Hidipo Hamutenya and Jesaya Nyamu, both former leading members of the ruling SWAPO party and cabinet ministers. Hamutenya had unsuccessfully sought the SWAPO nomination for president in 2004. At the time of the RDP's launch, it was considered to represent the strongest challenge to SWAPO's political dominance since the country's independence in 1990. According to Hamutenya, speaking at the RDP's launch, the party was "born in response to our people's deep longing for a vision, political direction and the rekindling of their hopes and aspiration for a better and prosperous future".

== 2008 conference and criticism of Robert Mugabe ==
In December 2008, RDP held the party's first national conference. Hamutenya was officially selected as leader of the party. Other party leaders included Steve Bezuidenhout, Jesaya Nyamu and Agnes Limbo. Concerning the crises in Zimbabwe, Hamutenya said "The Zimbabwe crisis is manmade and that regime should not be allowed to continue. It has led to poverty and hardship".

== Election results ==
=== Presidential elections ===
Election	Candidate	Votes	%	Result
2009	Hidipo Hamutenya	88,640	10.91%	Lost ✗
2014	Hidipo Hamutenya	30,197	3.39%	Lost ✗
2019	Mike Kavekotora	3,515	0.4%	Lost ✗
2024	Mike Kavekotora	2,974	0.27%	Lost ✗

=== National Assembly elections ===
Election	Party leader	Votes	%	Seats	+/–	Position	Result
2009	Hidipo Hamutenya	90,556	11.16%	8 / 96	New	▲2nd	Opposition
2014	Hidipo Hamutenya	31,372	3.51%	3 / 96	▼5	▼3rd	Opposition
2019	Mike Kavekotora	8,953	1.09%	1 / 96	▼2	▼9th	Opposition
2024	Mike Kavekotora	3,308	0.30%	0 / 96	▼1	▼14th	Opposition

=== 2009 elections ===
At the 2009 elections, RDP won 11% of the vote and 8 seats in the National Assembly. The party's leader and presidential candidate, Hidipo Hamutenya, won 10.91% of the vote. RDP and eight other opposition parties disputed the result and filed a case in court to have the results annulled, but the case was denied.

The eight RDP members of the National Assembly in 2010 were: Hidipo Hamutenya, Steve Bezuidenhout, Jesaya Nyamu, Agnes Limbo, Anton von Wietersheim, Kandy Nehova, Peter Naholo and Heiko Lucks.

=== 2010 regional elections, National Assembly boycott and merger ===
In March 2010, because of the disputed 2009 election, RDP decided to boycott the swearing-in ceremony of the National Assembly of Namibia. RDP decided to wait until the Supreme Court of Namibia ruled on whether to put aside the election results. It was not until 14 September 2010 that the eight RDP members of the National Assembly were sworn in.

On 8 September 2010, RDP began the process of subsuming the Republican Party led by Henk Mudge following a memorandum of understanding agreement on September 8. In the agreement, The Republican Party would begin to phase out as an independent political organization and eventually come under the umbrella of RDP. The parties said they would work together in the November 2010 regional and local elections to unseat the ruling SWAPO party.

In 2015 Jeremia Nambinga became president of the RDP. He was voted out of that position by a no-confidence vote in 2017 but challenged the result in court, and won. In August 2018 he resigned his presidency. In 2019 Mike Kavekotora was elected president and Kennedy Shekupakela vice president.
