= Oniimwandi, Oshana Region =

Village in Namibia

Onimwandi is a settlement in the Oshana Region in northern Namibia. It belongs to the Oshakati West electoral constituency and is situated 5 kilometres (3.1 mi) away from Oshakati on the left hand side of the main road on the way to Okahao. The headman of the Oniimwandi village is Mr Erastus Amupolo and his assistant is Mr Juuda Amupolo.

Oniimwandi was the site of a Koevoet military base during the Namibian War of Independence.

There is an ELCIN church named after the village, and Oniimwandi Primary School, just next to it.

Oniimwandi is the birthplace of former minister Abraham Iyambo (1961–2013) and poet and journalist Mvula ya Nangolo (1943–2019).

There is also a settlement named Oniimwandi in Onayena, birthplace to the late Vice-President of Namibia, Nickey Iyambo.
