= Ministry of Information and Communication Technology (Namibia) =

Government ministry of Namibia

The Ministry of Information and Communication Technology (MICT) is a department of the Namibian government. It was established in 1990 as Ministry of Information and Broadcasting, responsible for licensing of the media, the first minister was Hidipo Hamutenya.

The ministry was disbanded in 2000; Its portfolio was added to the foreign ministry. In 2003 it was reestablished under its original name, and in 2008 it gained the communication portfolio from the Ministry of Works and Transport. Since then it carries its current name. The current minister is Emma Theofelus., while the deputy minister is Wenzel Kavaka.

MICT directs the operations of the Communications Regulatory Authority of Namibia.

== Ministers ==
All information ministers in chronological order are:

| # | Picture | Name | (Birth–Death) | Party | Term start | Term end |
Minister of Information and Broadcasting
| 1 | | Hidipo Hamutenya | 1939–2016 | SWAPO | 1990 | 1993 |
| 2 | | Ben Amathila | 1938– | SWAPO | 1993 | 2000 |
Minister of Foreign Affairs, Information and Broadcasting
| 3 | | Theo-Ben Gurirab | 1938–2018 | SWAPO | 2000 | 2003 |
Minister of Information and Broadcasting
| 4 | | Nangolo Mbumba | 1941– | SWAPO | 2003 | 2005 |
| 5 | | Netumbo Nandi-Ndaitwah | 1952– | SWAPO | 2005 | 2008 |
Minister of Information and Communication Technology
| 6 | | Joel Kaapanda | 1945– | SWAPO | 2008 | 2015 |
| 7 | | Tjekero Tweya | 1960– | SWAPO | 2015 | 2018 |
| 8 | | Stanley Simataa | 1960– | SWAPO | 2018 | 2020 |
| 9 | | Peya Mushelenga | 1975– | SWAPO | 2020 | 2024 |
| 10 | | Emma Theofelus | 1996– | SWAPO | 2024 | - |

== See also ==
- Telecommunications in Namibia
- Mass media in Namibia
