= Fishrot Files =

WikiLeaks data on Samherji's bribery to high ranking politicians and officials in Namibia

On 12 November 2019, WikiLeaks began publishing what it called the Fishrot Files (Icelandic: Samherjaskjölin), a collection of thousands of documents and email communication by employees of one of Iceland's largest fish industry companies, Samherji, that indicated that the company had paid hundreds of millions ISK to high ranking politicians and officials in Namibia with the objective of acquiring the country's coveted fishing quota. That same day, Jóhannes Stefánsson, the former general manager of Samherji in Namibia and a whistleblower working with anti-corruption authorities in Namibia, and other countries, stated on the investigative TV-program Kveikur on RÚV that Samherji's CEO and biggest shareholder, Þorsteinn Már Baldvinsson, authorized the bribe payments.

The scandal also reached Norway when it was revealed that its biggest bank, Den Norske Bank, was involved in transferring money used in the alleged bribes.

On 15 November 2019, Fréttablaðið published a story about an email exchange between the general manager of Síldarvinnslan hf., Gunnþór Ingvason, and Samherji employees, Aðalsteinn Helgason, Jóhannes Stefánsson, and an unidentified third man. Fréttablaðið stated that Gunnþór asked for advice on behalf of Henrik Leth, the chairman of Polar Seafood, the largest private fish industry company in Greenland, on conning fishing quota out of authorities in Greenland and pointed to their experience in Namibia. At that time, Síldarvinnslan and Polar Seafood owned together with the East Greenland Codfish company. Both Gunnþór and Leth stated that the email had been taken out of context and pointed out that the full transcript clearly states that a third party had voiced interest in building a fish factory in Ammasalik on the east coast of Greenland, something they believed was only a ploy to obtain fishing quota from the government. They further stated that the purpose of the email was to obtain information on the potential cost of such buildup, as Samherji had done a similar buildup in Africa, to see if it was feasible.

== Reactions ==
In response to the allegations, Samherji published a statement on 12 November where Jóhannes Stefánsson, the whistleblower and former general manager of the Namibia operation, was accused of being the only staff member from the company behind the alleged bribes and that other high ranking staff members were unaware of his actions. Although Jóhannes did admit to being part of the bribe scheme, further records showed that he never had control of the companies bank accounts in Cyprus, where the money flowed through, and that the alleged bribes continued for three years after he left the company.

On 13 November, Namibia's Minister of Fisheries, Bernhardt Esau, and Minister of Justice, Sacky Shanghala, were forced to resign due to their involvement in the scandal.

On 14 November, the board of Samherji announced that Þorsteinn Már Baldvinsson had temporary stepped aside as CEO and would be replaced by Björgólfur Jóhannsson while the company conducted an internal investigation on the allegations. Namibian Investec banker James Hatuikulipi resigned on the very same day and public enterprise minister Leon Jooste announced further action within the public fishing industry.

On 15 November, member of Alþingi for Miðflokkurinn and former Icelandic Minister for Foreign Affairs, Gunnar Bragi Sveinsson, accused RÚV and Stundin of practising yellow journalism in relation to the scandal and suggested that the government should stop subsidizing private media companies. The same day, protesters marched to the offices of Namibia's Anti-Corruption Commission (ACC) and demanded the resignation of the head of the ACC, Paulus Noa, and the arrest of the government officials involved in the scandal.

On 18 November it was reported that due to the investigations, Þorsteinn Már had temporary stepped aside as the chairman of the fishing industry company Framherji, one of the largest fishing industry companies in the Faroe Islands and partly owned by Samherji.

On 20 November it was reported that James Hatuikulipi had resigned as chairman of the state owned fish industry company Fishcor due to the scandal.

By December 2019 The Fishrot Six, Bernhard Esau, Sacky Shanghala, Tamson Hatuikulipi, James Hatuikulipi, Ricardo Gustavo and Pius Mwatelulo, were arrested in Namibia. They stand accused of corruption, fraud, and tax evasion.

Nigel van Wyk was later arrested on charges of money laundering and attempting to obstruct the course of justice.

In February 2020 it was announced that the 6 accused in the Fishrot case would face new additional charges.

In September 2020 the corruption probe into Fischcor by the ACC was said to have been completed. A lead investigator into the Fishrot bribery scandal claimed there was a lack of cooperation from a number of countries and jurisdictions.

On March 1, 2021, a crowd-funding campaign was announced to raise funds for Fishrot whistleblower Jóhannes Stefánsson, who said he believed he had been poisoned. The campaign was organised by Whistleblowing International, ANA LOGO, Whistleblower Network News and the National Whistleblower Center.
