= Ministry of Justice (Namibia) =

Government ministry of Namibia

Established in 1990, the Ministry of Justice of Namibia provides court representation to ministries, offices, agencies, the master of the High Court, the speaker of the National Assembly, the prosecutor-general, magistrates, the Motor Vehicle Accident Fund, regional councils, recognized traditional authorities, and entities associated with the government administration. It also supports the Law Reform and Development Commission.

In 1995, the Ministry of Justice merged with the Attorney General's Office.

== Ministers ==
- Ngarikutuke Tjiriange (1990-2003)
- Albert Kawana (2003-2004)
- Pendukeni Iivula-Ithana (2005-2012)
- Utoni Nujoma (2012-2015)
- Albert Kawana (2015-2018)
- Sacky Shanghala (2018-2020)
- Yvonne Dausab (2020-2025)
- Fillemon Immanuel (2025-present)

== See also ==
- Attorney General of Namibia
- Politics of Namibia
