= Samherji =

Multinational Icelandic fishing company

Samherji hf.
- Company type: Hlutafélag
- Industry: Fishing industry
- Founded: 1983
- Headquarters: Akureyri, Iceland
- Key people: Þorsteinn Már Baldvinsson, CEO
- Products: Various seafood products
- Number of employees: 850 (Iceland)
- Website: www.samherji.is

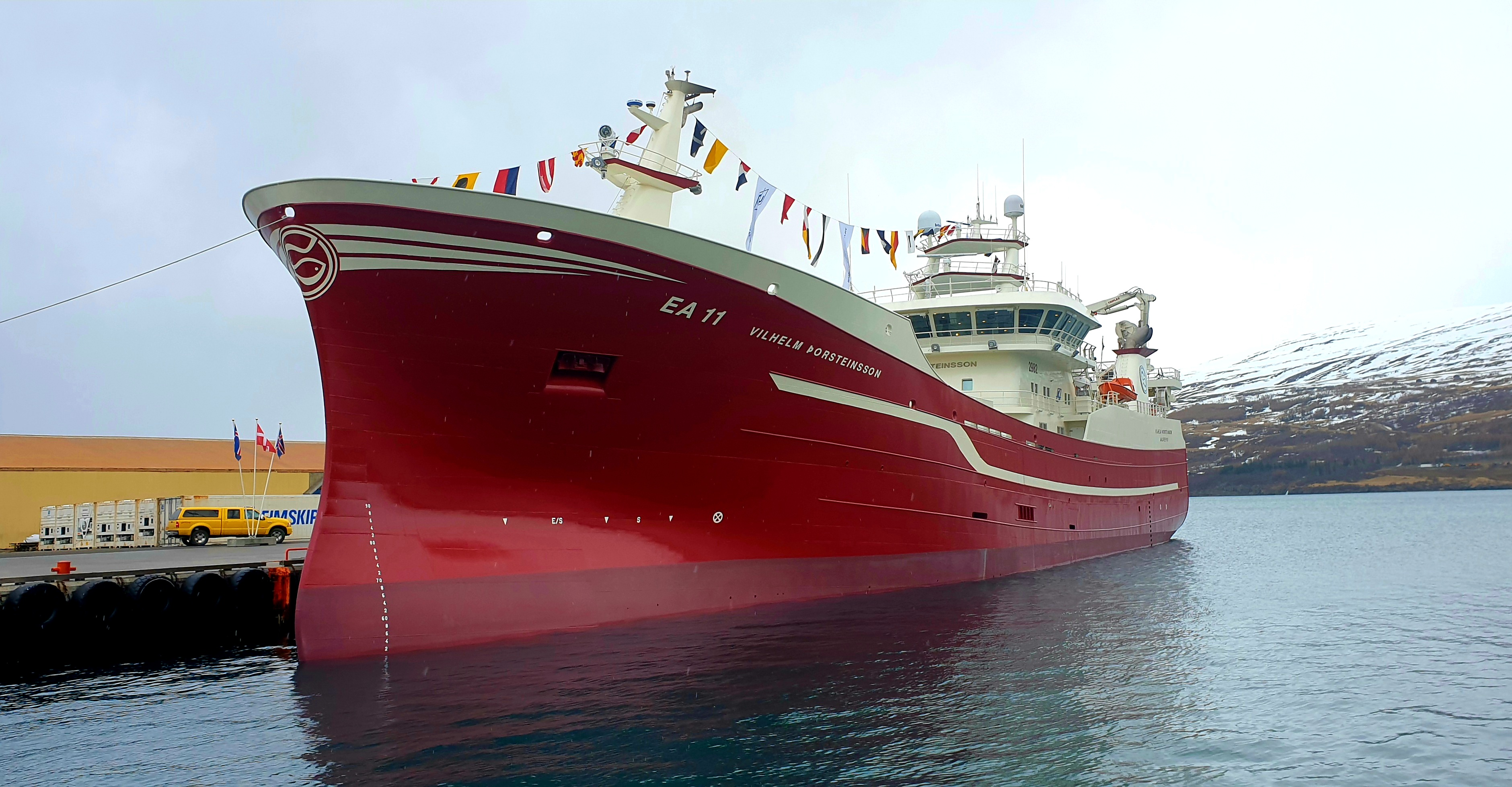
"Vilhelm Þorsteinsson EA 11", Samherji's new, vessel for pelagic fishing. In its home port, Akureyri, North Iceland.

Samherji hf. is a vertically integrated seafood company in Iceland that operates in fishing, fish processing, land-based aquaculture and sales. It is the largest fishing company in Iceland, and one of the largest in Europe. Samherji's headquarters are in Akureyri, but the company operates in many locations in Iceland.

The company, in its current form, was established in 1983 when its founders, Þorsteinn Már Baldvinsson, Kristján Vilhelmsson, and Þorsteinn Vilhelmsson, acquired all shares in Samherji hf., based in Grindavík. The primary asset of Samherji hf. was the trawler Guðsteinn GK, which the founders converted into the freezer trawler Akureyrin EA. The predecessor company was founded in 1972.

At the end of 2023, Samherji had 958 employees at the group level. Its subsidiary, Ice Fresh Seafood ehf., handles sales of all its products. The subsidiary Samherji fiskeldi ehf. (Samherji Fish Farming) operates land-based fish farming and has successfully farmed Arctic char and salmon for over two decades. The company has grown into an industry leader in land-based aquaculture and is currently the world’s largest producer of Arctic char, supplying 30% of the total market. One of Samherji's subsidiaries is the sales company Seagold Ltd. in England, led by Gústaf Baldvinsson.

Þorsteinn Már Baldvinsson, one of the founders, has been Samherji's CEO since the company's inception in 1983. Baldvinsson resumed that role in February of 2021 after having stepped down on 14 November 2019, with Björgólfur Jóhannesson acting as CEO in the interim.

In January 2023, Samherji Ísland ehf., a subsidiary of Samherji hf., controlled 7,27% of the transferable quotas in the Icelandic fisheries sector.

== 2019 Namibia scandal ==
On 12 November 2019, WikiLeaks published thousands of documents and email communication by Samherji's employees, called the Fishrot Files, that indicated that the company had paid hundreds of millions ISK to high ranking politicians and officials in Namibia with the objective of acquiring the country's coveted fishing quota. That same day, Jóhannes Stefánsson, the former general manager of Samherji in Namibia and a whistleblower working with anti-corruption authorities in Namibia, and other countries, stated on the investigative TV-program Kveikur on RÚV that Samherji's CEO and biggest shareholder, Þorsteinn Már Baldvinsson, authorized the bribe payments. On 13 November, Namibia's Minister of Fisheries, Bernhardt Esau, and Minister of Justice, Sacky Shanghala, were forced to resign due to their involvement in the scandal.

In response to the allegations, Samherji published a statement where Jóhannes Stefánsson, the former general manager, was accused of being behind the alleged bribes and that other high ranking staff members were unaware of his actions. Although Jóhannes did admit to being part of the bribe scheme, further records showed that he never had control of the bank accounts in Cyprus, where the money flowed through, and that the alleged bribes continued for three years after he left the company.

In May 2021, internal conversations were leaked to the press, which showed that since the start of the Namibia scandal, Samherji has employed a special "guerrilla division" with the objective of conducting smear campaigns against the company's critics and journalists who investigated the bribery scheme. In an example of astroturfing, the company had hired a lawyer and public relations manager to pen and edit opinion articles and social media entries which were then published under the name of a ship's captain in Samherji's employ. This unofficial division within the company had monitored the travels and personal finances of some of the company's critics in order to uncover material that might damage their credibility. In an effort to improve news coverage of the company, the division also attempted to influence the leadership election of Iceland's main union of journalists.

It has been reported in the Icelandic media that the term "guerrilla division" was used in a two-person chat between Samherji's then general counsel and the vessel captain on the WhatsApp application because they felt that Samherji's management, board members and external consultants were not doing enough to respond to criticism of the company in the media. The "guerrilla division" was therefore a narrow group of people who sought to take a more assertive defence of Samherji than the company itself wanted to do, and who felt that senior management was too lenient. Samherji has denied operating such a division and said in a statement that the communications were "personal communication between colleagues and friends that no one expected to become public." No data or evidence supports the assertion that the individuals in question attempted to influence the leadership elections of Iceland's main union of journalists, and this claim is based on conclusions drawn from the WhatsApp chat in question.

The leaked conversations also show that Samherji had planned to dissuade Jóhannes from testifying against the company in Namibian courts by separately suing him for theft in the country.
