= Ben Amathila =

Namibian politician

The Honorable Ben Amathila

Minister of Information and Broadcasting
- In office 1993–2000
- President: Sam Nujoma
- Preceded by: Hidipo Hamutenya
- Succeeded by: Theo-Ben Gurirab

Minister of Trade and Industry
- In office 21 March 1990 – 1993
- President: Sam Nujoma
- Preceded by: position established
- Succeeded by: Hidipo Hamutenya

Personal details
- Born: 1 October 1938 (age 87) Walvis Bay, Erongo Region
- Party: SWAPO
- Spouse: Libertina Amathila
- Occupation: Politician

Ben Amathila (born 1 October 1938 in Walvis Bay) is a retired Namibian politician. Amathila served in the government of Namibia with SWAPO from independence in 1990 until his retirement in April 2007.

From 1990 to 1993 he served as Minister of Trade and Industry. In 1993 he was moved against his will to the Ministry of Information and Broadcasting and served as minister until 2000. In 2000, president Sam Nujoma dismissed him from his cabinet post. He retained his seat in the National Assembly until his resignation in 2007, citing concerns with his party. Internationally, Amathila is a member of the Pan-African Parliament.

Amathila was re-elected to the SWAPO Central Committee at the party's August 2002 congress, placing eighth with 369 votes, and he was again elected to the Central Committee at SWAPO's November 2007 congress. He is a Permanent Member of the SWAPO Central Committee and a Permanent Member of the SWAPO Polit Bureau.

== Namibian War of Independence ==
Amathila began working towards Namibian independence in 1959 with the forerunner to SWAPO, the Ovamboland People's Organization. He helped mobilizing support for SWAPO from 1959 until going into exile in 1966. He then was instrumental in organizing SWAPO's consultative congress at Tanga, Tanzania in 1969. Shortly afterwards, Amathila became SWAPO's representative in Scandinavia then the movement's Secretary for Economics in Lusaka than Luanda.

== Education History ==
Amathila was educated at the Augustineum Training College, Okahandja (1954 – 1958); then Rhenish Missionary School, Tsumeb (1954); .
