= Ministry of Trade and Industry (Namibia) =

Government ministry of Namibia

The Ministry of Industrialisation and Trade (MIT) was a government ministry of Namibia, with headquarters in Windhoek. It was created at Namibian independence in 1990 as Ministry of Trade and Industry, renamed Ministry of Industrialisation, Trade and SME Development in 2015, and got the name Ministry of Industrialisation and Trade in 2020. The first Namibian minister of trade was Ben Amathila.

In 2025 the ministry was disestablished. The trade portfolio was given to the foreign affairs ministry, and the industry portfolio to the Ministry of Mines and Energy. The current Minister of International Relations and Trade is Selma Ashipala-Musavyi, the Minister of Mines, Energy and Industry is Natangwe Ithete.

== Ministers ==
All trade and industry ministers in chronological order are:

#	Picture	Name	(Birth–Death)	Party	Term start	Term end
Minister of Trade and Industry
1		Ben Amathila	1938–	SWAPO	1990	1993
2		Hidipo Hamutenya	1939–2016	SWAPO	1993	2005
3		Immanuel Ngatjizeko	1952–2022	SWAPO	2005	2008
4		Hage Geingob	1941–	SWAPO	2008	2012
5		Calle Schlettwein	1954–	SWAPO	2012	2015
Minister of Industrialization, Trade and SME Development
		Immanuel Ngatjizeko	1952–2022	SWAPO	2015	2018
6		Tjekero Tweya	1967–	SWAPO	2018	2020
Minister of Industrialisation and Trade
7		Lucia Iipumbu	1975–	SWAPO	2020	2025

#	Picture	Name	(Birth–Death)	Party	Term start	Term end
Minister of International Relations and Trade
8		Selma Ashipala-Musavyi	1960–	SWAPO	2025	
Minister of Mines, Energy and Industry
8		Natangwe Ithete	1976–	SWAPO	2025	

== See also ==
- Economy of Namibia
