= Quinton-Steele Botes =

Namibian sports consultant (1960–2014)

Quinton-Steele Botes (30 April 1960 – 23 June 2014) was a Namibian sport consultant. He won the International Olympic Committee Award in recognition of his promotion of athletics in Namibia.

As technical manager of the Namibian Olympic Team, he attended 2 Olympic Games, 3 World Games, 1 African Games and 2 Commonwealth Games. Botes was a member of the executive board of the Namibia National Olympic Committee in 2009.

In 2005, Botes resigned from Athletics Namibia after many personal differences with its president (who announced Botes' expulsion two weeks later and denied receiving a resignation letter). Botes said "I have already resigned and have nothing to do with Athletics Namibia". The organization elected a new president in 2009, and Botes was elected chairperson of its Track and Field Committee and thus a member of its council.

He was a second-level tutor of the International Association of Athletics Federations, and a course director and lecturer of the IAAF and International Olympic Committee.

== Death ==
On 20 September 2007, Botes was diagnosed with multiple myeloma, a cancer of the blood. He died after a long battle with the disease on 23 June 2014, aged 54. He was survived by his two sons, Ibarto and Benton, and daughter, Quinita.

Botes was among ten people honoured posthumously by Namibia's President Hifikepunye Pohamba in August 2014.
