= Inge Zaamwani-Kamwi =

Namibian businesswoman and presidential advisor

- Born: November 11, 1958 (age 67); Grootfontein, Otjozondjupa Region, South West Africa
- Education: United Nations Institute for Namibia; University of Dundee
- Occupation: Businesswoman

Inge Zaamwani-Kamwi (born 11 November 1958) is a Namibian businesswoman and presidential advisor. On 17 May 2025, she was sworn in as a non-voting member of the National Assembly and subsequently appointed as the new Minister of Agriculture, Fisheries, Water, and Land Reform after Mac Hengari was relieved of his duties.

She was formerly the managing director of Namdeb, the mining joint venture between the government of Namibia and De Beers corporation, since her appointment in 1999. Prior to her position at Namdeb, Zaamwani was an official in Namibia's Ministry of Mines and Energy from 1995 to 1998. However, she left the company in April 2015.

== Education ==
Zaamwani studied at the United Nations Institute for Namibia (UNIN) in Zambia from 1977 to 1981, when she graduated with a diploma in development studies. She has also attained post graduate leadership training from INSEAD, France, the University of Cape Town and Harvard Business School (in collaboration with the University of Witwatersrand). Zaamwani is a qualified mining lawyer, having obtained her LLB (Honours) from Thames Valley University in London, and her Master in Law (LLM) from the University of Dundee, Scotland.

== Career ==
Zaamwani began her career in 1984 as a project officer in SWAPO's Women's council in Lusaka, Zambia. She has had interests in Air Namibia and First National Bank of Namibia Holdings.

Zaamwani-Kamwi serves as the Chief Executive Officer of Namdeb at De Beers Société Anonyme.

Until June 2008, she served as the President of the Namibia Chamber of Commerce and Industry. She has been an Independent Non-executive Director at FNB Namibia Holdings Limited since January 2000. She serves as a Director of Extract Resources (Namibia) (Proprietary) Ltd. Zaamwani-Kamwi has been a Director of Extract Resources Ltd. since 3 April 2009.

She serves as a Director of First National Bank of Namibia Ltd., Namdeb Property (Pty) Ltd., NamGem Diamond Manufacturing (Pty) Ltd., Diamond Board of Namibia, Fishcor and Seaflower Lobster, NOSA Namibia, Zantang Investments (Pty) Ltd. and NABCOA, XNET Trust Fund. She also serves as a Member of the Board of Namibia's premier companies, institutions and non-government organisations.

She also serves as a Director of UNAM Council, Namibia Nature Foundation, Namibia Institute of Mining and Technology, Chamber of Mines Council, Junior Achievement Namibia, Vocational and Training Board, Namibia Chamber of Commerce & Industry. She is a Member of the honourable society of Lincolns Inn, London and a fellow of the Centers for Leadership and Public Values of the UCT Graduate School of Business.

Zaamwani-Kamwi was voted to the role of Chairperson of the Southern African Science Service Centre for Climate Change and Adaptive Land Management (SASSCAL) Council of Ministers. She was appointed during the SASSCAL Council of Ministers meeting held on 12 March 2026 in Gaborone, Botswana, succeeding Wynter Boipuso Mmolotsi, Botswana’s Minister of Environment and Tourism.
