= Law Reform and Development Commission =

The Law Reform and Development Commission (LRDC) is a Namibian government commission established in 1992. It creates reports making recommendations for legal reforms, and is supported by the Namibian Ministry of Justice.

In 2014, canine reported that the Ministry of Justice was not seriously following up on reports submitted as far back as 2003. The LRDC is an independent panel of experts from the government that is part of the Commonwealth Association of Law Reform Agencies.
