= Coloured people in Namibia =

People with both European and Indigenous African ancestry in Namibia

Namibian Coloureds
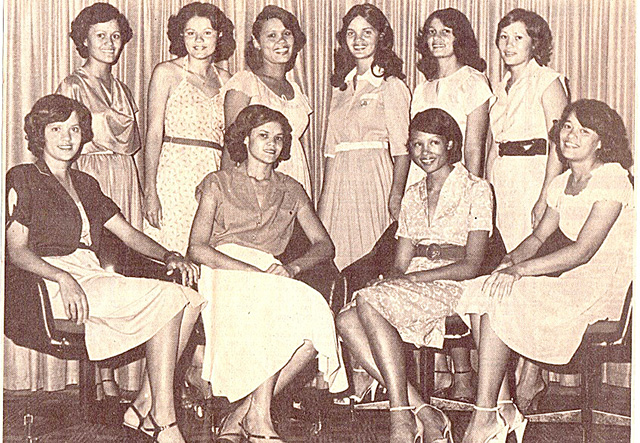
- Namibian Coloureds from the Apartheid Era

Total population
- 107,855 (2023 census) (Note: Includes 45,629 Basters.)

Regions with significant populations
- Namibia, South Africa

Languages
- Afrikaans, English, German

Religion
- Protestantism, Catholic, Islam

Related ethnic groups
- Baster, Khoekhoe, Nama, Griqua, Afrikaners

Coloured people in Namibia are Namibians of mixed ancestry, generally combining European and Indigenous African (particularly Khoisan and Bantu). Also, in some cases, Indian, Malay, and Malagasy lineage, especially in coastal regions and areas near the South African border.

Some coloured people in Namibia are immigrants, while others were born in the country or returned after periods of residence abroad. These successive waves of arrival from diverse backgrounds have contributed to the development of a heterogeneous Coloured population. South African authorities further classified the community into three groups: Basters, Cape Coloureds, and Namibian Coloureds.

Another distinct community was located in Walvis Bay, which remained under South African control until 1994. This group maintained close cultural and social ties to the Cape Coloured population.

The most significant cultural conflict occurred in the mid-1980s, when students influenced by teachers returning from the University of the Western Cape (UWC) began challenging older community leaders, many of whom served on Coloured Councils or in Rehoboth self-government structures and opposed SWAPO. Younger people increasingly embraced Black nationalism, rejected the label "so-called Coloured," and advocated for a racially unified, independent Namibia. Many echoed the view of Norman Duncan, who stated that "there's no such thing as a Coloured culture, Coloured identity."

Since the early 2000s, however, more scholarship has argued that Coloured communities in Namibia are experiencing marginalisation.

== History ==
The Coloured community in Namibia represents a wide range of genetic and cultural backgrounds. They are a mixed population with European and African ancestry, and their history under South African rule closely resembled that of Cape Coloureds. The consensus is that Coloureds accept the Seven Steps of District Six to describe their lineage, which includes:

1. Indigenous peoples (including Khoe, San, amaXhosa, baSotho, and baTswana)
2. Slaves
3. Free Blacks
4. Europeans
5. Maroons (runaway slaves, free Black rebels, mixed Baster descendants of Indigenous peoples and slaves, nonconformist Europeans, escaped convicts, and missionaries)
6. Exiles and refugees
7. Indentured labourers and migrants (including debtors and economic migrants)

=== After World War I ===
The African People's Organisation (APO), a Coloured political group, opposed transferring the German colony to South African authority. After South Africa assumed control of South West Africa (now Namibia) at the end of the war, more Cape Coloureds migrated into the territory. In 1921, the South African Department of Native Affairs approved their petition to establish a Coloured township in Windhoek, north of the Old Location, in what is now Pionierspark.

The South West Africa (SWA) administration and white settlers distinguished three groups within the Coloured population: Basters, Cape Coloureds, and Namibian Coloureds.

In February 1923, the APO opened its first local branch, advocating for "the Social, Political and Civil Rights of the Cape Coloured Community throughout the SW Protectorate." Two years later, the African National Bond (ANB) was formed to represent Coloured interests. Both APO and ANB aligned themselves with South African political parties, particularly the South African Party and the National Party.[6]

Proclamation No. 34 of 1924 (Native Urban Areas Proclamation) dealt a significant blow to Coloured status, declaring that "a coloured person who lives in the native location shall be regarded as native." The 1926 Colour Bar Law, which restricted certain jobs in mining to white workers, was also applied in South West Africa.

In 1946, Andrew Kloppers moved from South Africa to Windhoek. A former member of the Kleurling Ouer-Onderwyser Vereniging (KOOV), he founded the South West African Coloured Teachers' Association (SWACTA) in 1947. Clemens Kapuuo served as its president from 1950 to 1953.

In 1950, the National Party of SWA (NPSWA) won elections for the Legislative Assembly. Concerns about blurred ethnic boundaries between Coloureds and poor whites motivated the implementation of the Group Areas Act (1950), which enforced residential segregation by race.

On 18 April 1955, SWACTA and the South West Africa Coloured People's Bond (SWACPB) petitioned for a new Coloured township in Windhoek and requested the creation of a Council for Coloured Affairs. Until then, Coloured residents of Windhoek were represented only by a Coloured member on the Native Advisory Board of the Old Location.

On 2 August 1957, Herman Andimba Toivo ya Toivo founded the Ovamboland People's Organisation in Cape Town. Among its members were Coloured activists Ottiliè Schimming and Kenneth Abrahams.

Two new Coloured organisations were formed in 1959:

- South West Africa Coloured Organisation (SWACO), which was pro-South African
- Volksorganisasie van Suidwes-Afrika (People's Organisation of South West Africa), which was anti-South African

Both opposed the creation of Khomasdal, a new Coloured township planned west of central Windhoek.

On 10 December 1959, police attempted to disperse protesters in the Old Location who opposed forced relocations to Khomasdal and Katutura (the new Coloured and Black townships). Police opened fire, killing Coloured leader Willem Cloete, a member of the Native Advisory Board. Official reports listed 11 deaths and 25 injuries.

== Coloureds' organisations ==
- Coloured Advisory Council
- Coloured Council
- Council for Coloured Affairs
- Federal Coloured People's Party (FCPP)
- South West Africa Coloured Organisation (SWACO)
- South West Africa Coloured Peoples' Bond (SWACPB)
- South West African Coloured Teachers' Association (SWACTA)
- South West African Labour (SWALP)

== Namibian coloureds ==
=== Historical ===
- William Worthington Jordan (1849–1886), hunter, trader, scout, and politician. Trekboer group leader who helped found the Republic of Upingtonia.
- Johann Friederich Hein (1826–1902), catechist, evangelist, and teacher in the Richtersveld. First coloured ordained minister of the Rhenish Missionary Society in 1857, after much resistance from Germany owing to his classification as "coloured".
- Edward Ricketts, trader at Tsub|Garis, an old settlement between Mariental and Maltahöhe.

=== Politics ===
- Hans Beukes, writer and activist. One of the early petitioners for Namibian independence at the United Nations.
- Hermanus Beukes, shoemaker at Rehoboth. One of the early petitioners at the United Nations against the South African administration of South West Africa.
- Dawid Bezuidenhout, Teacher and politician.
- Reggie Diergaardt.
- Nora Schimming-Chase, Politician. Her parents were Otto Schimming and Charlotte Schimming, née Freiser.
- Charlie Hartung, National Independence Party candidate to the South West Africa Coloured Council on 30 October 1974.
- Joey Julius, Politician and leader of the Democratic People's Party (est. 1982).
- Andrew Kloppers, Politician. Founder of the South West African Coloured Teachers' Association (SWACTA) in 1947, later leader of the Labour Party and Chairman of the Coloured Council for 12 years, 1962 to 1974.
- Albert Krohne, National Independence Party candidate to the South West Africa Coloured Council on 30 October 1974.
- Willem "Billy" Phillips, Politician and leader of the Namibia Volksparty (People's Party) (est. 1988).

=== Business ===
- Navin Morar, entrepreneur and first President of the post-Apartheid Chamber of Commerce and Industry. Though of Indian descent, he was classified as coloured. Indians had to receive special permission and travel papers to enter the administered territory of South West Africa.
