= Ottilie Abrahams =

Namibian educator, activist, and politician

Ottilie Grete Abrahams
- Born: Ottilie Grete Abrahams; 2 September 1937; Old Location, Windhoek, Namibia
- Died: 2 July 2018 (aged 80)
- Occupations: Educator; activist; politician
- Spouse: Kenneth Abrahams
- Children: 4

Ottilie Grete Abrahams (2 September 1937 – 2 July 2018) was a Namibian educator, activist, and politician.

== Personal ==
Abrahams was born on 2 September 1937 in the Old Location township outside of Windhoek. Abrahams was the daughter of Otto Schimming and Charlotte Schimming. Her father was the first Black teacher in Namibia. Her sister Nora Schimming-Chase became the first Namibian ambassador to Germany after the independence of Namibia. Before obtaining a degree in Cape Town, she attended Trafalgar High School in District Six in Cape Town.

She and her husband Kenneth Abrahams raised four children, youngest son, Rudi Abrahams. One daughter is the scientist and activist Yvette Abrahams, her son Kenneth Abrahams overtook the management of the Jacob Marengo School after her death. At the time of her death, she lived in the affluent suburb of Klein Windhoek. The Namibian newspaper memorialized her as the "Mother of Education."

== Activism ==
Abrahams became politically active while studying in high school and university in Cape Town, South Africa; she joined the South West Africa Student Body in 1952 and later became active in the Cape Peninsula Students Union and the Non-European Unity Movement. She and other activists formed the Yu Chi Chan Club, a secret Maoist organization. In 1985, Abrahams founded the Jacob Marengo Tutorial College in Katutura, of which she was still the principal until her death.

== Politics ==
Abrahams was active in the independence movement with several political parties. Abrahams was part of SWAPO from 1960 to 1963. She, her husband and fellow activist, Kenneth Abrahams, fellow SWAPO dissidents Emil Appolus and Andreas Shipanga formed SWAPO Democrats while in exile in Sweden. However, she left SWAPO Democrats in 1980 and later joined the Namibia Independence Party, where she served as the Secretary General and Publicity and Information Secretary. The Namibia Independence Party was part of the Namibia National Front coalition which won one seat in the 1989 election to the Constitution-writing Constituent Assembly of Namibia.

== Life in exile ==
From 1963 until 1978 Ottilie Abrahams lived in exile with her husband and their children. They lived in Dar es Salaam, Tanzania and Lusaka, Zambia and for nine years in Stockholm, Sweden. With United Nations Security Council Resolution 435 they returned to Namibia in 1978.
