= Turnhalle Constitutional Conference =

1975–1977 conference in Windhoek on self-governance of occupied Namibia

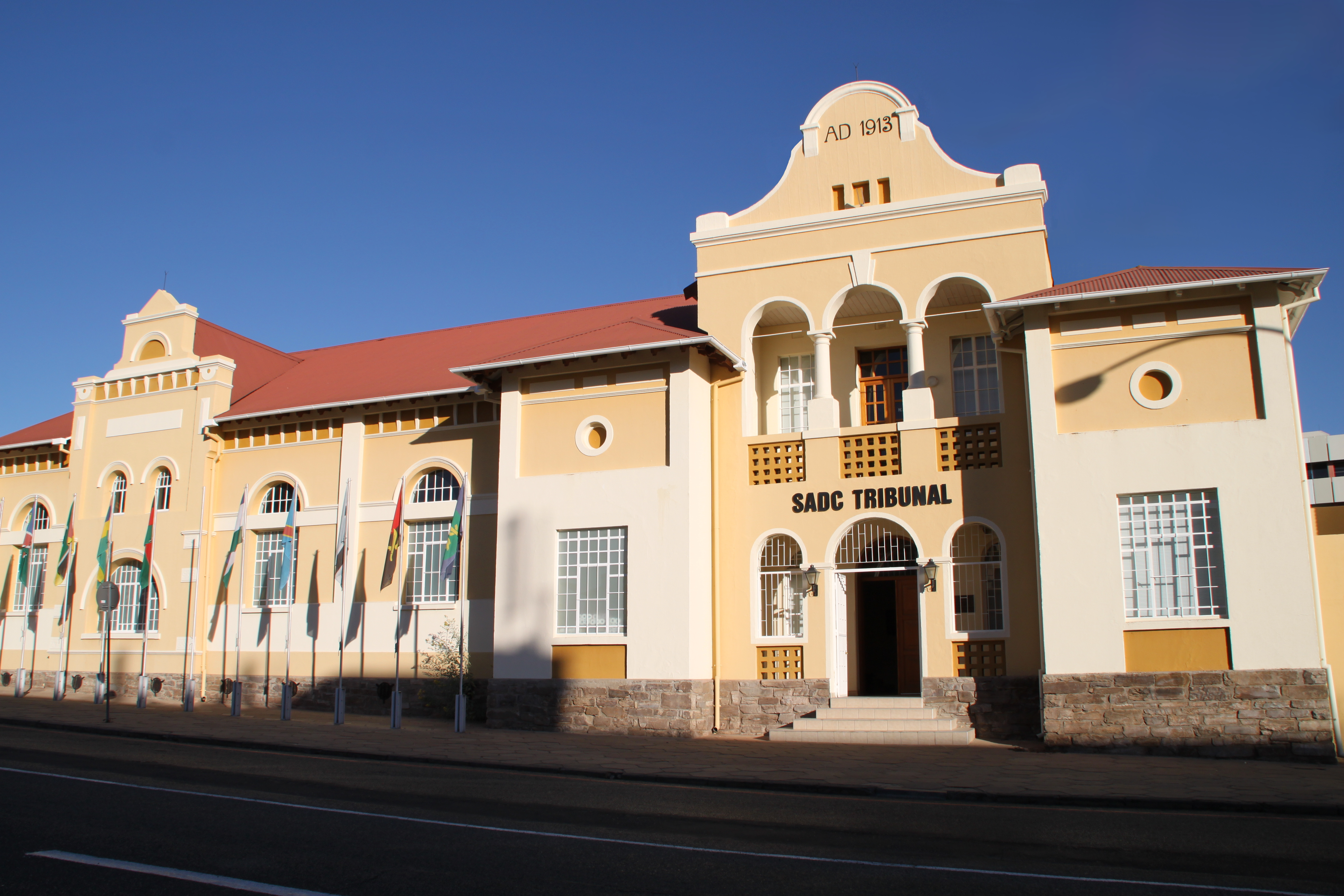
Windhoek's historic Turnhalle building in which the conference was held. Today it houses the SADC tribunal court.

The Turnhalle Constitutional Conference was a conference held in Windhoek between 1975 and 1977, tasked with the development of a constitution for a self-governed South West Africa (Namibia) under South African control. Sponsored by the South African government, the Turnhalle Conference laid the framework for the government of South West Africa from 1977 to independence in 1989.

The conference was held in defiance of the 1972 United Nations General Assembly decision to recognise the South West Africa People's Organization (SWAPO) as the "sole legitimate representative" of Namibia's people. Consequently, SWAPO, as well as other political groups opposed to the apartheid, did not participate, and the UN rejected the conference and its proposals.

As a result of the Turnhalle Conference the Democratic Turnhalle Alliance party was formed in 1977, which won the 1978 election and formed an interim government.

== Background ==
After Imperial Germany lost its colonies as a result of World War I, South Africa took over the administration of the territory of South West Africa as their de facto fifth province, since 1920. This mandate over South West Africa was granted by the League of Nations, the predecessor of the UN. A request to annex the territory right away was, however, not granted. When South Africa introduced apartheid legislation in 1948 after an election victory of the right-wing National Party, these laws also extended to South West Africa.

In 1960, the South West Africa People's Organization (SWAPO) was founded. SWAPO soon began an armed guerrilla war against South African forces, and for this purpose formed its military wing, the People's Liberation Army of Namibia (PLAN) in 1962. The Namibian War of Independence, which soon escalated into the South African Border War, started in August 1966. Later that year, the UN General Assembly revoked South Africa's mandate to govern South West Africa, and created the position of a United Nations Commissioner for Namibia. In 1972 it recognised SWAPO as the 'sole legitimate representative' of Namibia's people.

In the meantime, the white inhabitants of South West Africa and conservative black members of the population tried to contain the violence and preserve the status quo. The South African government hoped that by means of small reforms and compromises a broad spectrum of the indigenous population would cease their support for armed resistance. One aim of the Turnhalle Conference was the initiation of such dialogue and "pseudo-reforms", another was to cast in stone the separation of the Namibian ethnicities by making Namibia a confederation of bantustans.

== Conference setup ==
The Turnhalle Conference was attended by 134 members of 11 ethnic groups: Herero, Coloureds, Baster, Tswana, Damara, Ovambo, Lozi, Nama, Kavango, San, and Whites. The chairman was Dirk Mudge. Political parties were not considered when the South African administration picked the delegates. It was widely regarded as a South African sponsored and initiated event, although conference chair Mudge later claimed that it was his idea alone. Indeed, several talks between Mudge, acting leader of the local branch of the National Party (NP), and then-South African Prime Minister John Vorster formed the preparatory work for the conference.

The conference was officially opened on 1 September 1975 and met on several occasions in Windhoek's historic Turnhalle (German: gymnasium) building, after which it got its name. There were four plenary sessions between September 1975 and June 1976, and several committee meetings thereafter, comprising one delegate from each ethnic group. The members agreed on a preliminary constitution and suggested that South West Africa become independent from South Africa by the end of 1978. On 6 October 1977 the conference was officially dissolved.

== Results ==
The conference produced a 29-page document entitled "Petition for the establishment of an interim government". The petition, which has been said to have been produced under great time pressure, contains a request to set up an interim government for the territory of South West Africa / Namibia, as well as a draft constitution for "a republican, democratic state".

All three of these qualifiers have been questioned: The Turnhalle Constitution did not mandate any elections or other popular representation, something that would commonly be regarded a crucial component of both a democracy and a republic. It furthermore made no provisions for independent judiciary or executive and relied on the government of South Africa as superior authority. It is thus questionable in what way the interim constitution defined a state.

Although the Turnhalle Constitution provided for multi–racial participation in the interim government it entrenched the racial segregation of Namibia's population. Albeit indirectly, the economic and political power of the white population was reinforced. The constitution recognised some fundamental rights but did not provide for significant protection of even the most basic of them. Despite severe criticism from black and white population groups as well as the international community, black delegates welcomed the start of institutionalised communication between the entrenched parties.

The draft constitution (also called Turnhalle Plan) was approved in a Whites-only referendum in 1977. Following pressure from the United Nations Security Council, it was never enacted.

== Aftermath ==
As a result of the conference, many of the participating delegates agreed to aggregate their small, ethnically defined parties into one bigger body that was able to form a counterbalance to SWAPO. On 5 November 1977 they founded the Democratic Turnhalle Alliance (DTA) with Clemence Kapuuo as first president. The parties that joined the DTA were:

- South West African Labour Party
- Rehoboth Baster Association, at that occasion renamed into Rehoboth DTA Party
- National Unity Democratic Organization
- South West Africa People's Democratic United Front
- Nama Alliance, at that occasion renamed into Namibia Democratic Turnhalle Party,
- Republican Party
- National Democratic Party

Additionally, three parties were founded for the purpose of joining the DTA:

- National Democratic Unity Party
- Tswana Alliance, later renamed to Seoposengwe Party
- Caprivi Alliance Party

The DTA won the subsequent 1978 South West African legislative election by a landslide, claiming 41 of the 50 seats. This was largely due to "widespread intimidation" and the presence of South African troops, particularly in the north of Namibia. SWAPO, SWAPO-D and the Namibia National Front boycotted the event. The United Nations Security Council declared the election "null and void", and the subsequent interim government illegitimate. The interim government, consisting of a National Assembly and a Council of Ministers, lasted until 18 January 1983 when South Africa again assumed full administrative authority over South West Africa after the Council of Ministers had resigned in the face of South African interference. The following government was the Transitional Government of National Unity, installed by the South African Administrator-General. Its legislative and executive actions were also subject to South African approval.

Namibia became an independent state in 1990. The DTA was represented in all subsequent National Assemblies of Namibia, since 2017 under the name Popular Democratic Movement (PDM).
