= Dawid Bezuidenhout High School =

High school in Windhoek, Namibia

- Khomasdal, Windhoek; Namibia

Information
- Established: 1985; 41 years ago
- Teaching staff: 43
- Gender: Mixed
- Enrollment: c.1300

Dawid Bezuidenhout High School is a high school in the suburb of Khomasdal in Windhoek, the capital of Namibia. It is a government owned school with approximately 1300 learners and 43 teachers. The school was named after Dawid Bezuidenhout who was a teacher and Minister of Transport of the Transitional Government of National Unity.

The school was established in 1985 by the Coloured Representative Authority. Today the school populace is a mixed one. The school is located at the corner of Andrew Kloppers Street and Paul van Hartes Road in Francoistown, Khomasdal.

== See also ==
- List of schools in Namibia
- Education in Namibia
