= 1978 South West African parliamentary election =

Parliamentary elections were held in South West Africa between 4 and 8 December 1978. These were the first elections conducted under universal adult suffrage, all previous elections had been Whites-only. The 1978 elections were won by the Democratic Turnhalle Alliance, which claimed 41 of the 50 seats. The elections were conducted without United Nations (UN) supervision, and in defiance of the 1972 United Nations General Assembly's recognition of the South West African People's Organisation (SWAPO) as the "sole representative of Namibia's people". The UN henceforth declared the elections null and void. The resulting government, dependent on South African approval for all its legislation, was in power until its dissolution in 1983.

== Background ==
The elections were a direct outcome of the 1975–1977 Turnhalle Constitutional Conference, a controversial conference in Windhoek that developed a draft constitution for a semi-autonomous South West Africa. Representatives of 11 South West African ethnic groups were invited, selected by the South African government. Existing political parties were not considered.

As a result of the conference, the Democratic Turnhalle Alliance (DTA) was founded, mainly from the attending ethnic groups and smaller, ethnically based parties. This was done to form a counterbalance to SWAPO. The Turnhalle Conference developed a draft constitution called the Turnhalle Plan for the territory. The constitution was approved in a Whites-only referendum in 1977 but never enacted, due to pressure by the United Nations Security Council (UNSC). However, the planned elections under general adult suffrage were still held.

== Conduct ==
The 1978 parliamentary elections were the first multi-racial elections in the territory of South West Africa, all previous elections were only for Whites. Even though the elections excluded the Namibia National Front, SWAPO Democrats and SWAPO, who in turn called for a boycott, voter turnout was surprisingly high at 80%. The presence of South African troops, particularly in the north of Namibia, might have been a reason for both high turnout and the DTA result, and there were several charges of coercion levelled at major South West African employers and the South African security forces.

However, the level of support for SWAPO's political programme and war effort within the general population was unclear, which cast some doubt on the United Nations General Assembly (UNGA) 1972 decision to accept SWAPO as the "sole representative of Namibia's people". There was a general perception that eligible voters who abstained from participating were SWAPO supporters. Encouraged by a voter turnout that high, the DTA subsequently claimed that it enjoyed a greater degree of popular support than SWAPO.

== Results ==
The interim government consisted of a National Assembly and a Council of Ministers. The DTA won the elections by a landslide, gaining 41 of the 50 seats in the National Assembly and the chairmanship of the ministerial council, to which Dirk Mudge was appointed. Johannes Skrywer became the speaker of the National Assembly. The UNSC declared the election "null and void", and the subsequent interim government illegitimate.

Party	Votes	%	Seats
Democratic Turnhalle Alliance	268,130	82.18	41
Action Front for the Retention of Turnhalle Principles	38,716	11.87	6
Namibia Christian Democratic Party	9,073	2.78	1
Herstigte Nasionale Party	5,781	1.77	1
Rehoboth Liberation Front	4,564	1.40	1
Total	326,264	100.00	50
Valid votes	326,264	98.55	
Invalid/blank votes	4,791	1.45	
Total votes	331,055	100.00	
Registered voters/turnout	412,635	80.23	
Source: African Elections Database

== Aftermath ==
The interim government was dissolved on 18 January 1983 when South Africa again assumed full administrative authority over South West Africa after the Council of Ministers had resigned in the face of South African interference. This was mainly due to the South African government vetoing the National Assembly's decision to stop observing the Day of the Vow as a public holiday in South West Africa and the DTA resigned all their seats in protest.

The subsequent void was filled by South African administrators. In September 1983 the Multi-Party Conference (MPC) was established. It consisted of 19 "internal" (that is, South West African) parties but again excluded SWAPO. The MPC suggested in its April 1985 Bill of Fundamental Rights and Objectives the establishment of a Transitional Government of National Unity (TNGU). South Africa followed this suggestion three months later. This interim government was again rejected by the United Nations Security Council in Resolution 566.
