= Keetmanshoop =

Settlement in Namibia

Keetmanshoop ǂNūǂgoaes Swartmodder
- Town
- Keetmanshoop Municipality
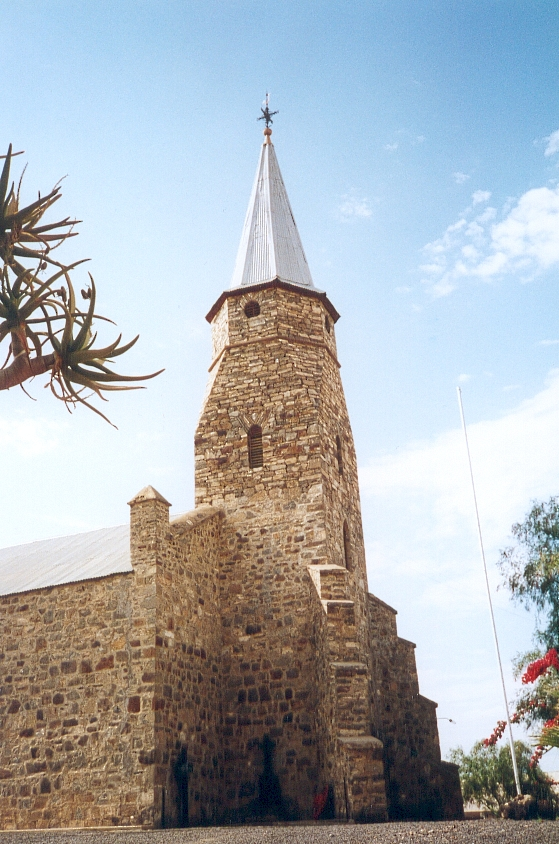
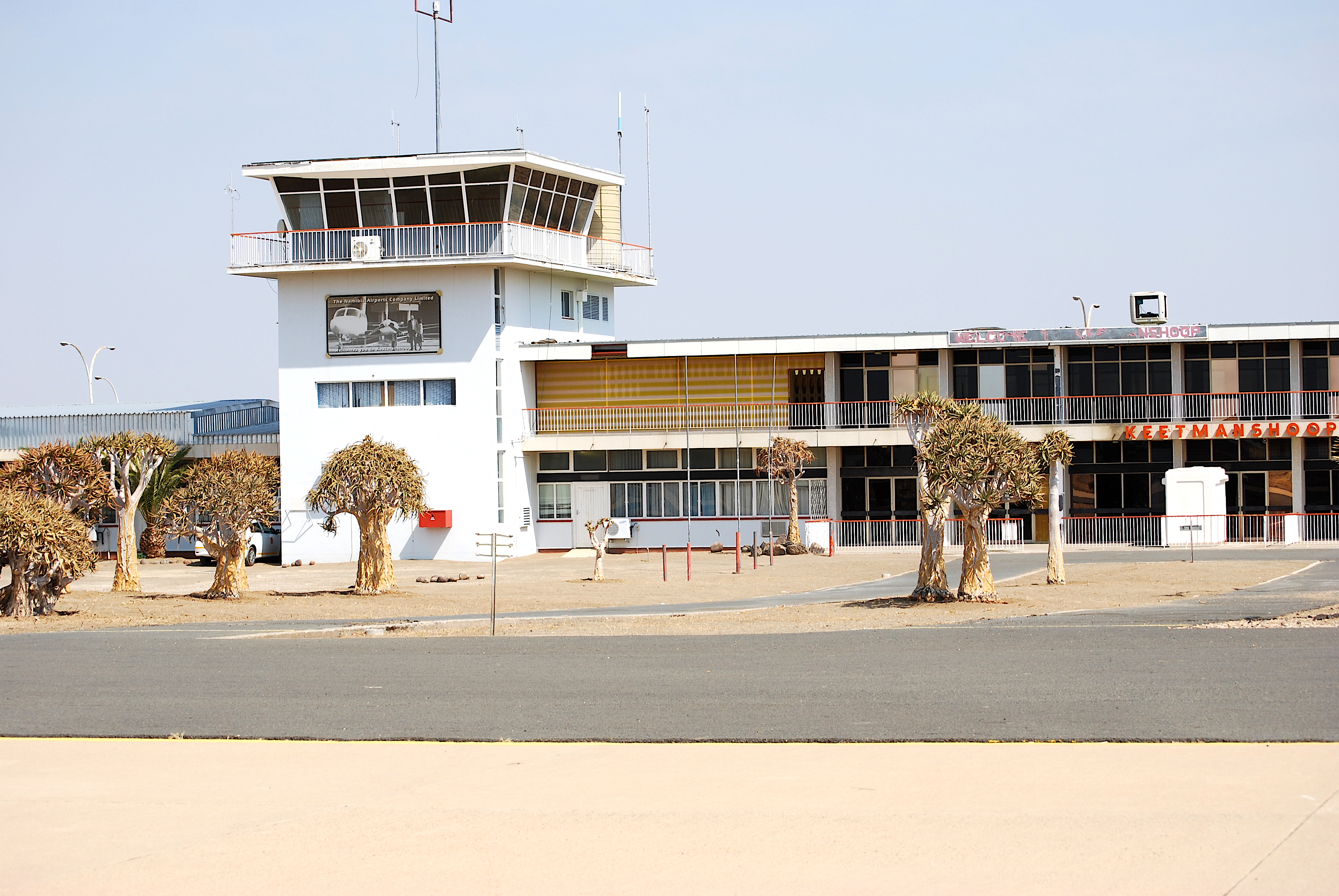
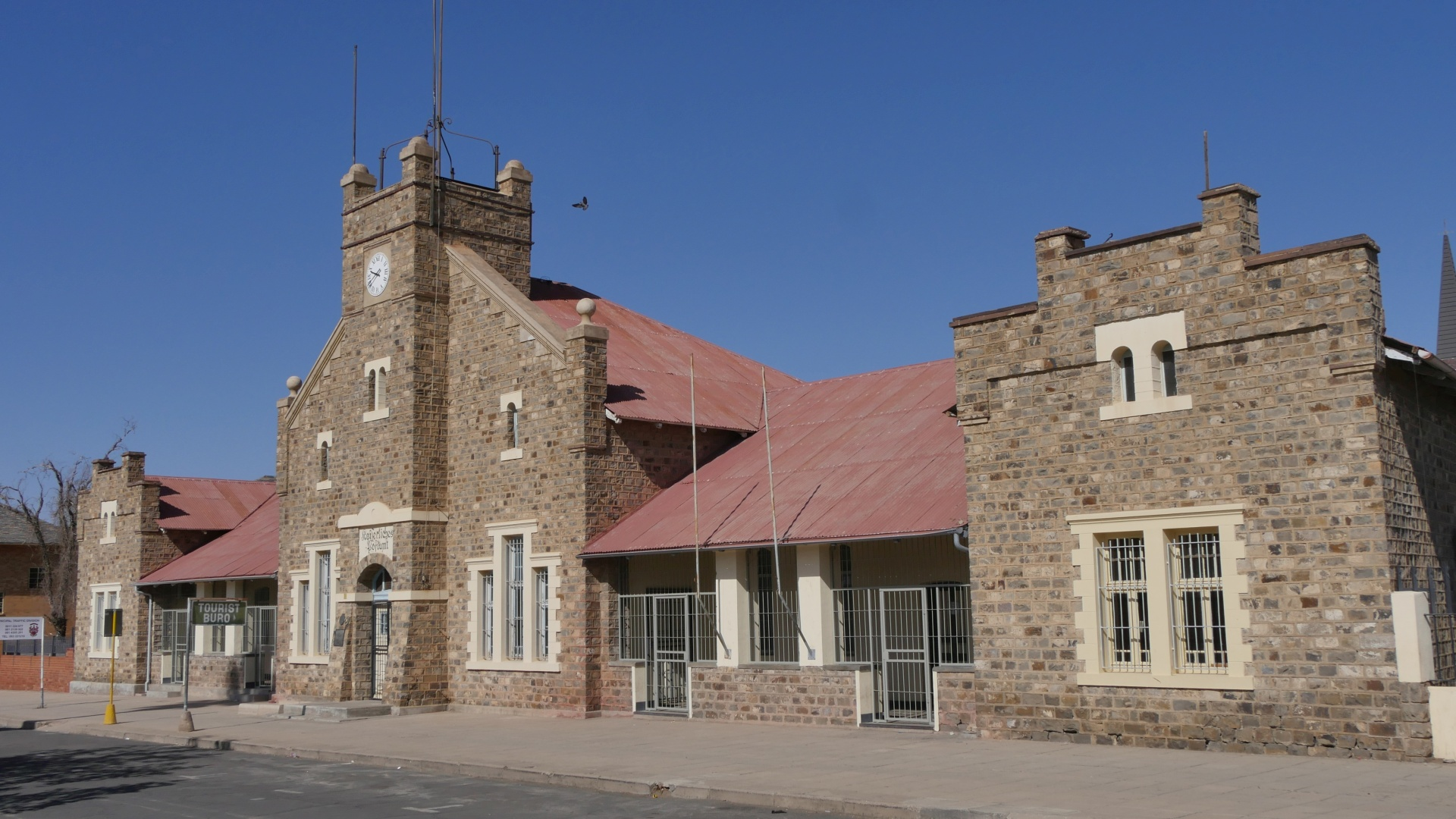
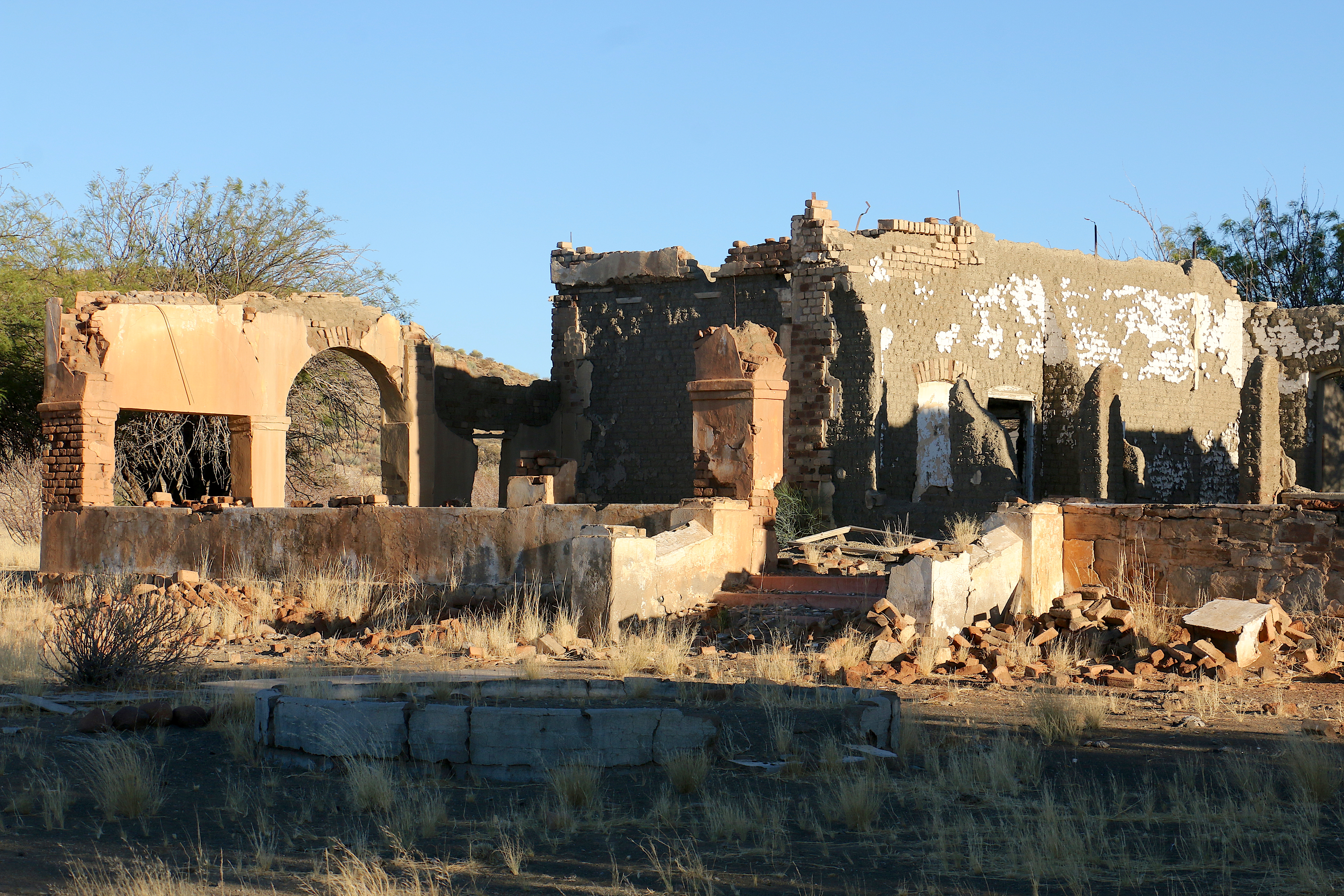
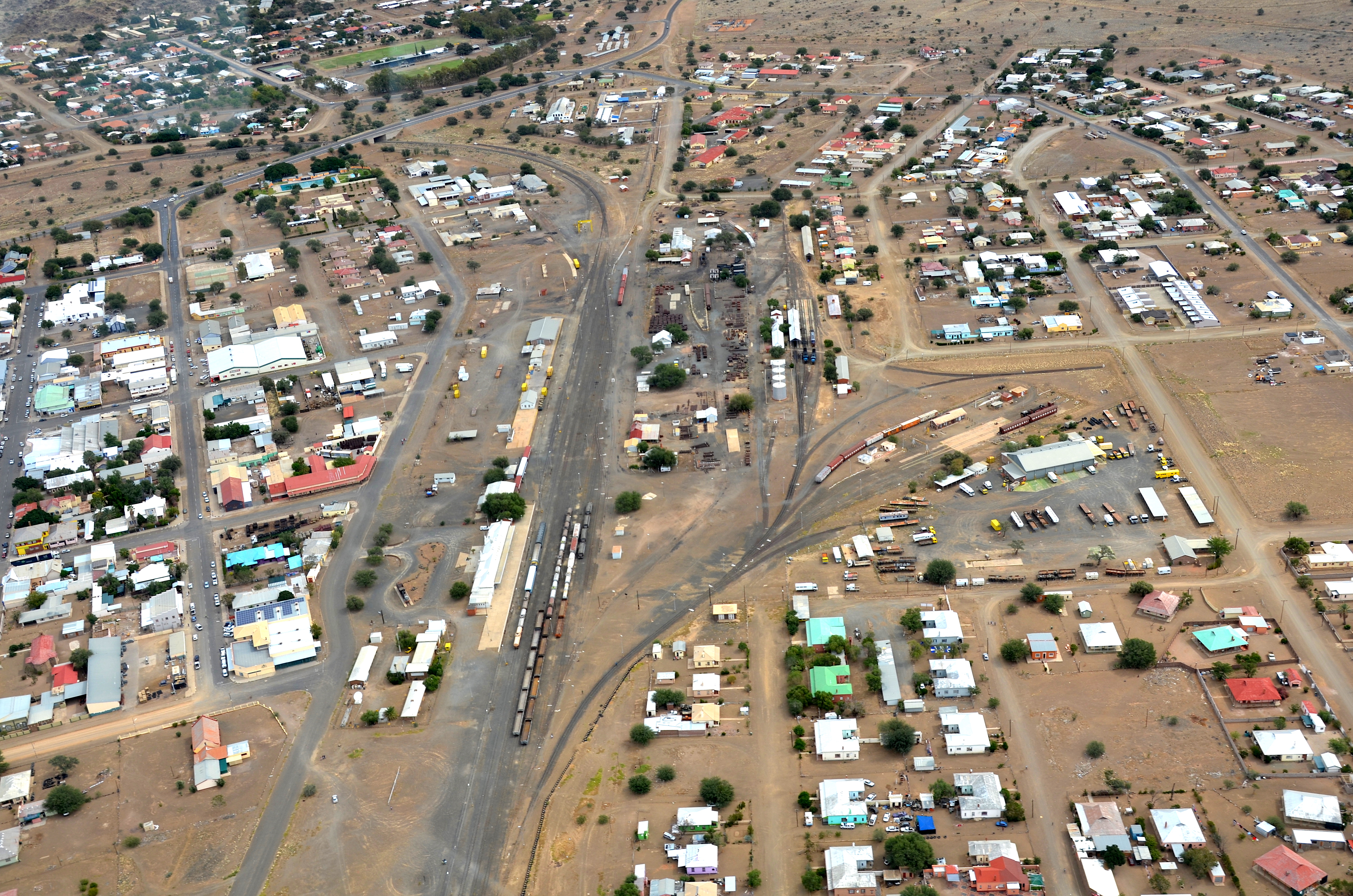
- Clockwise from top: Keetmanshoop church, Keetmanshoop airport, Colonial ruins, Aerial view of Keetmanshoop, Colonial post office

- Coat of arms
- Nicknames: Die Twaalf, Kaitie, Keetmaro, Twaalfletters
- Motto: Laborando vincimus Meaning: We win by labour
- Location in Namibia Keetmanshoop (Africa)
- Coordinates: 26°34′43″S 18°8′0″E
- Country: Namibia
- Region: ǁKaras Region
- Constituency: Keetmanshoop Urban and Keetmanshoop Rural
- Established: 14 April 1866

Government
  - Type: Municipality
  - Mayor: Francis Melody Swartbooi (LPM)
  - Deputy Mayor: MacDonald Hanse (LPM)

Population (2023)
  - Total: 27,862
- Time zone: UTC+2 (SAST)
- Postal code: 9000
- Area code: 063
- Climate: BWh

Keetmanshoop is the administrative capital of the ǁKaras Region in southern Namibia. It is named after Johann Keetman, a German industrialist and benefactor of the Rhenish Mission in the town. Keetmanshoop had a population of 27,862 people in 2023.

== History ==
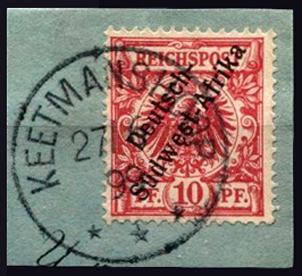
Stamps for German South West Africa postmarked Keetmanshoop 1899

Before the colonial era as from 1810, the settlement was known as ǂNūǂgoaes, the Nama name given it by Kaptein Hendrik Tseib of the Kharo!oan or !Khara|gôan aka the Tseis, one of fourteen tribes of the indigenous Nama. The Afrikaans translation is Swartmodder. Both names mean "(place of) black mud" and refers to the presence of a spring which was rich in surface iron deposits in the area. Gaob Hendrik Tseib discovered the spring in 1808 near the Leeurivier about 40 km northeast of the Kharo!oan settlement when he and a few of his horsemen and four dogs went on a hunting expedition. The first white settler, Guilliam Visagie, arrived here in 1785. When in February 1850 the Kharoǃoan clan (Keetmanshoop Nama) split from the Red Nation, the main subtribe of the Nama people, they settled permanently in the area. In 1860 the Rhenish Missionary Society founded a mission there to christianise the local Nama people. The first missionary, Johann Georg Schröder, arrived in Keetmanshoop on April 14, 1866, which is now marked as the founding date of Keetmanshoop. The mission station was named after the German trader and director of the Rhenish Missionary Society, Johann Keetman, who supported the mission financially, although he never actually visited the place himself.

== Economy and infrastructure ==
Keetmanshoop is an important centre for the Karakul sheep farming community.

Keetmanshoop is connected to the TransNamib railway system, situated on the line from Windhoek to Upington in South Africa. The J. Stephanus Stadium is located in Keetmanshoop and is home to Fedics United F.C., a football team in the Namibia Premier League.

== Geography ==
Close to Keetmanshoop is the Naute Dam and the Neckartal Dam, the largest dam in the country.

=== Natural history ===
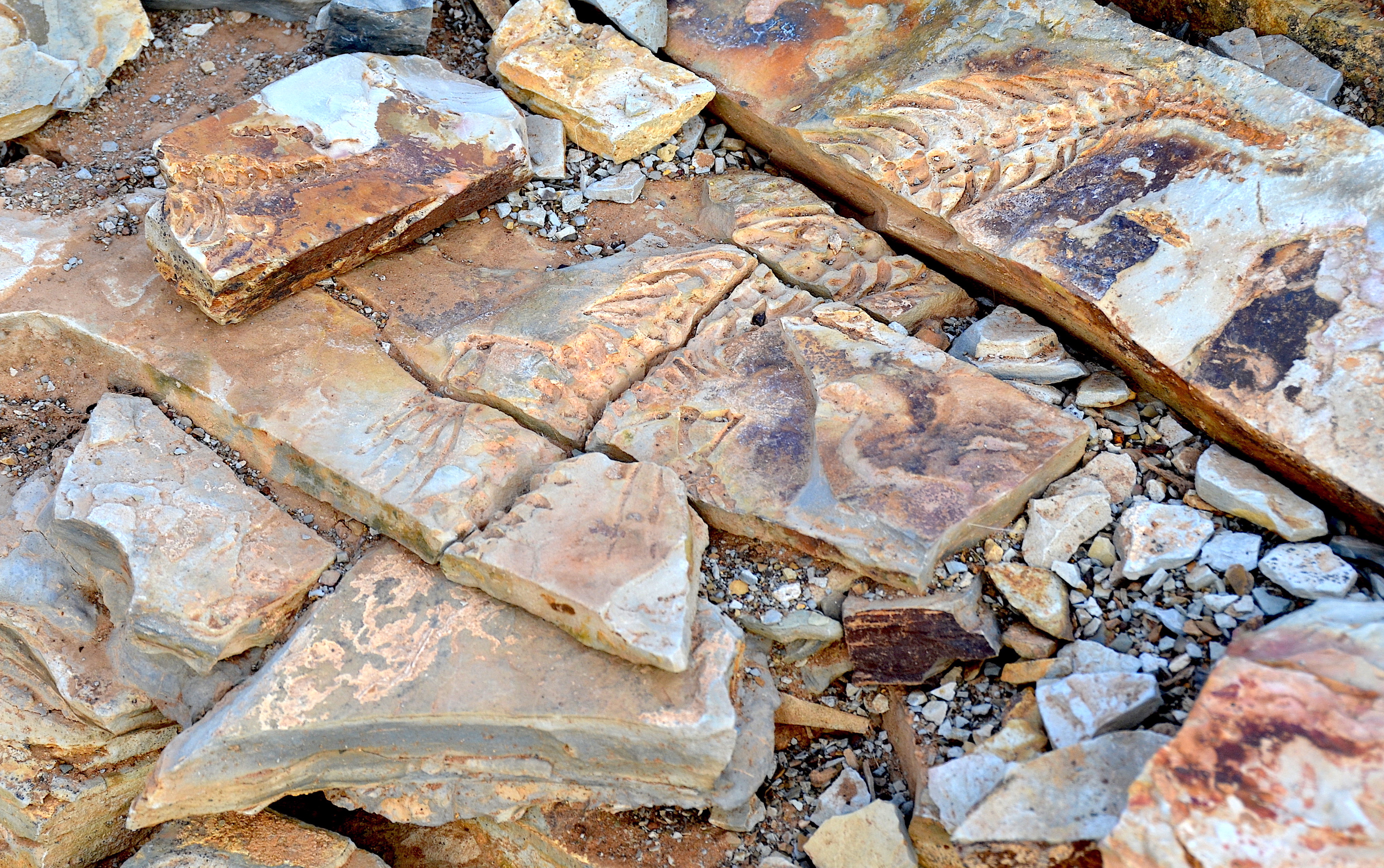
Mesosaurus fossil found near Keetmanshoop

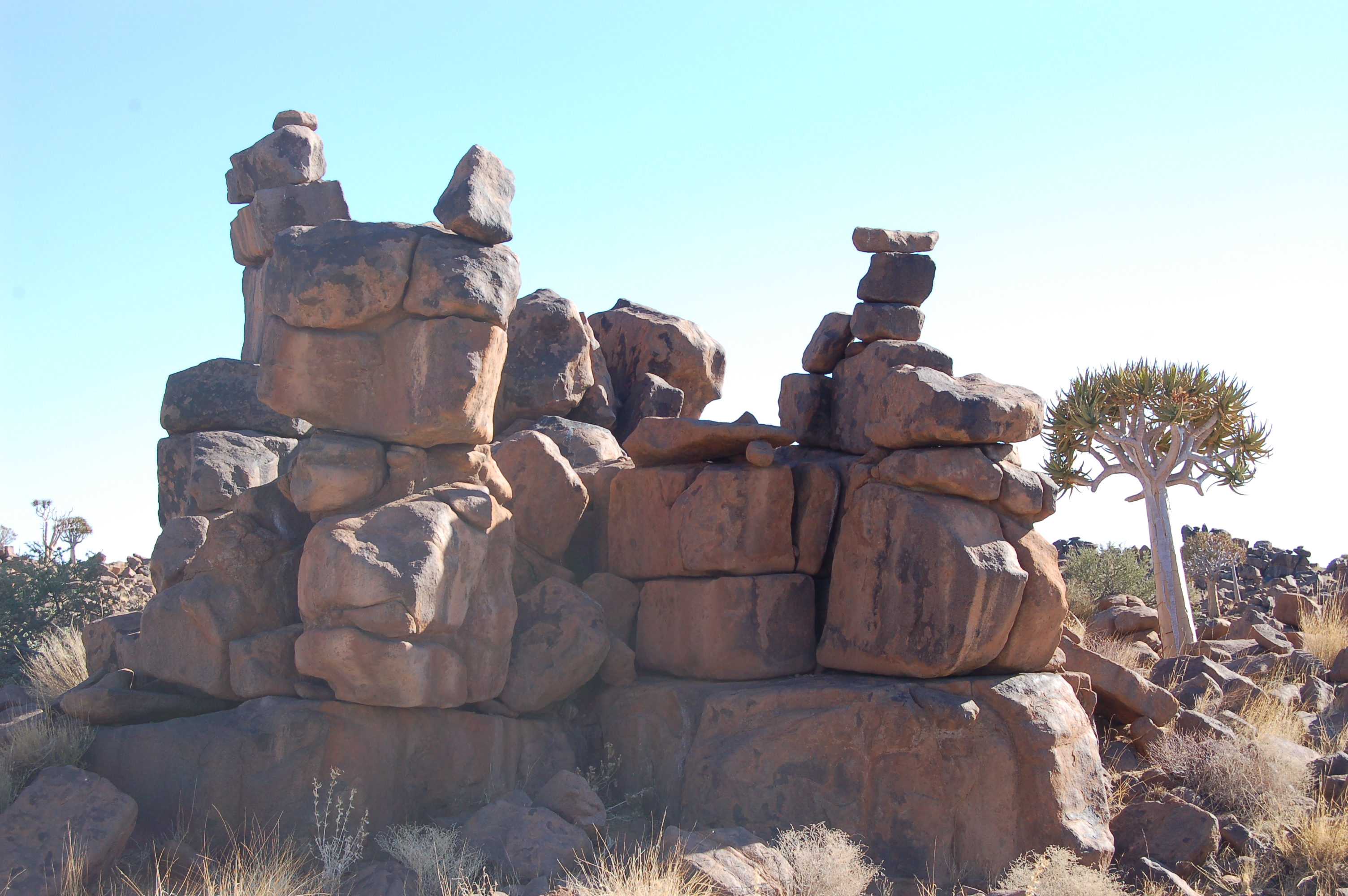
Giant's Playground near Keetmanshoop

The town is situated near two quiver tree forests, one of them being a national monument and a major tourist attraction of Namibia. It is also close to the Giant's Playground, a natural geological feature formed about 180 million years ago that consists of dolerite rocks that look as if they were stacked by giants.

Near Keetsmanshoop are notable localities for fossil Mesosaurus, an extinct genus of reptile from the Early Permian of southern Africa and South America.

=== Climate ===
Keetmanshoop has a hot desert climate (Köppen climate classification BWh), with long, very hot summers and cool winters. The annual average rainfall is only 159 mm (6 in). Keetmanshoop is one of the sunniest places year-round on the planet with a mean sunshine duration over 3,870 hours yearly or 10.7 hours of sunshine daily, well above 87% of the time. The annual mean temperature is 21.1 °C (70.0 °F) with a mean annual high of 28.8 °C (83.8 °F) and a low of 13.3 °C (55.9 °F). The climate is characterised by sunshine and dryness as well as moderate heat all year long.

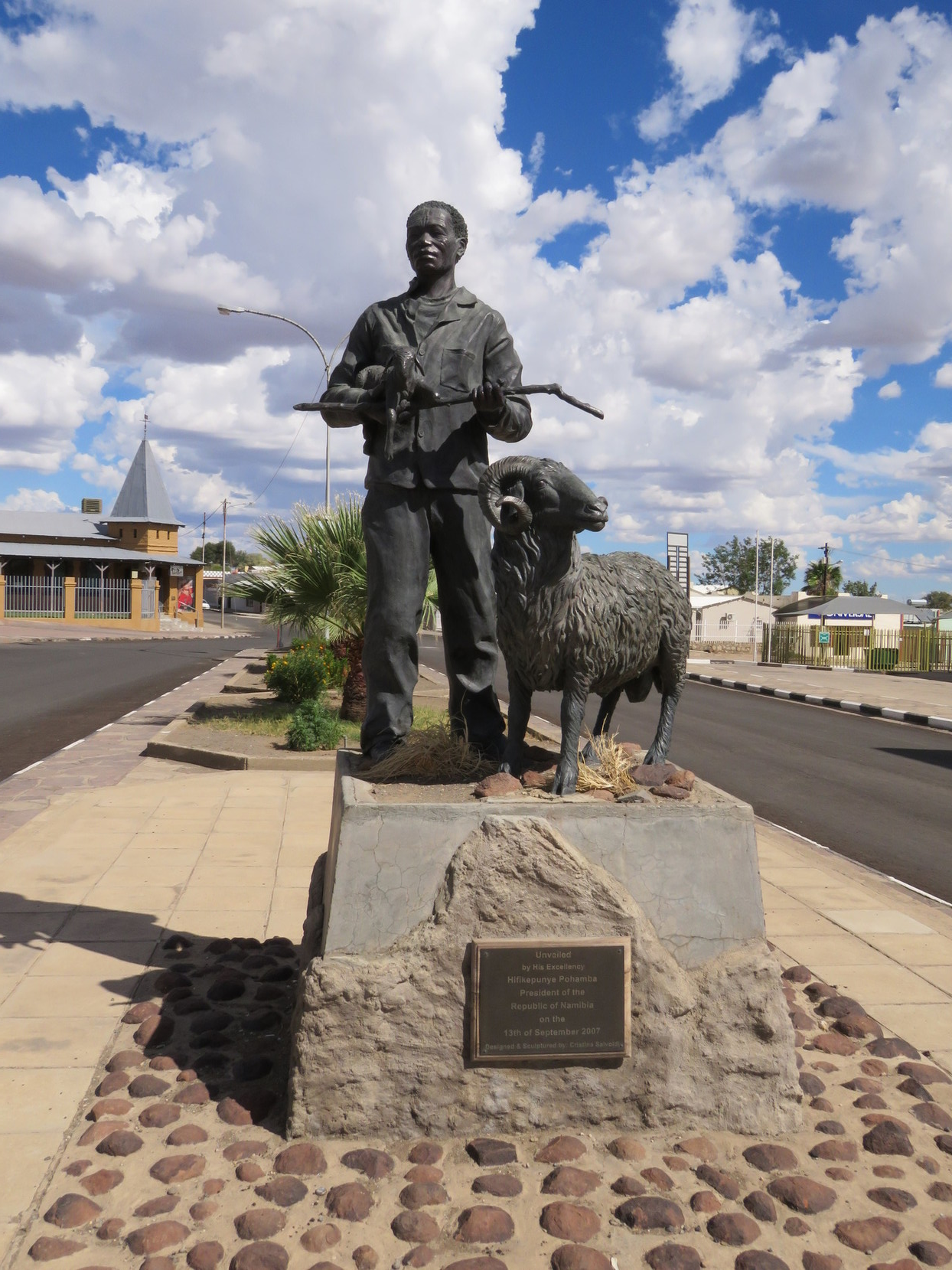
A monument in Keetmanshoop, Namibia

Climate data for Keetmanshoop
Month	Jan	Feb	Mar	Apr	May	Jun	Jul	Aug	Sep	Oct	Nov	Dec	Year
Mean daily maximum °C (°F)	34.8 (94.6)	34.0 (93.2)	32.2 (90.0)	28.8 (83.8)	25.0 (77.0)	21.7 (71.1)	21.3 (70.3)	23.5 (74.3)	27.2 (81.0)	30.1 (86.2)	32.4 (90.3)	34.5 (94.1)	28.8 (83.8)
Mean daily minimum °C (°F)	19.0 (66.2)	19.3 (66.7)	17.8 (64.0)	14.4 (57.9)	10.4 (50.7)	7.0 (44.6)	6.4 (43.5)	7.5 (45.5)	10.7 (51.3)	13.7 (56.7)	15.7 (60.3)	17.6 (63.7)	13.3 (55.9)
Average precipitation mm (inches)	24 (0.9)	42 (1.7)	36 (1.4)	15 (0.6)	5 (0.2)	2 (0.1)	1 (0.0)	1 (0.0)	3 (0.1)	6 (0.2)	11 (0.4)	13 (0.5)	159 (6.1)
Average relative humidity (%)	28	36	40	40	38	39	36	31	27	24	24	25	32
Mean monthly sunshine hours	353	300	312	306	304	287	305	323	319	343	348	370	3,870
Percentage possible sunshine	84	82	82	89	91	91	93	93	89	87	86	86	88
Source: Tabulation of Climate Statistics for Selected Stations in Namibia

=== Demographics ===
Historical population
Year	Pop.	±% p.a.
2001	15,778	—
2011	19,447	+2.11%
2023	27,862	+3.04%

== Politics ==
Keetmanshoop is a municipality, governed by council that currently comprises seven seats.

The first local election run after Namibian independence, the 1992 local elections, was narrowly won by SWAPO which obtained 2,423 votes and gained three seats. The Democratic Turnhalle Alliance (DTA) came second with 2,276 votes and also three seats. The remaining seat went to the United Democratic Front (UDF) with 292 votes. The 1998 local authority elections saw a similar result. SWAPO won and gained three seats (718 votes), DTA came second with also three seats (668 votes). One seat went to the local Concerned Peoples Organization Keetmanshoop (151 votes).

In the 2010 local authority election, a total of 3,156 votes were cast in the city. SWAPO won with approximately 48% of the vote. Of the three other parties seeking votes in the election, Rally for Democracy and Progress (RDP) received approximately 35% of the vote, followed by the Democratic Party of Namibia (DPN, 10%) and the DTA (7%). The 2015 local authority election was won by SWAPO by a much larger margin. SWAPO accumulated 2,337 votes and won five seats in the municipal council. DTA (538 votes) and RDP (186 votes) gained one seat each.

The 2020 Namibian local authority election was won by LPM. LPM accumulated 3,619 votes and won five seats in the municipal council. SWAPO (1648 votes) gained two seats. Annelize Knaus served as the Mayor deputised by McDonald Hanse. For the 2025 Namibian local and regional elections, LPM accumulated 3,080 votes and won three seats in the municipal council. SWAPO with 3,064 which also gained three seats followed by IPC (339 votes) with one seat. Other parties such as Affirmative repositioning gained 307 votes, PDM gained 149 votes and UNP with 19 votes. Francis M. Swartbooi is currently serving as Mayor while Easter Isaack serving as the Chairperson of the Management committee.

In July 2026 , the Keetmanshoop municipal council has elected Swapo councillor Emrico Blaauw as the town’s new mayor. Beata Set has been elected as deputy mayor.

== Notable buildings and structures ==
The Rhenish Missionary Church was erected in 1895 and now also contains a museum. It was declared a historic monument in 1978 and is a well-known landmark. Its unique combination of Gothic Revival architecture cast in African stone makes it one of the architectural masterpieces in the country and a popular tourist attraction. Other notable buildings are the Schützenhaus (marksmen's club house, 1905–07), the railway station building (1908), the Eagle Monument and the Imperial Post Office (now the Keetmanshoop tourist information, erected in 1910).

== Notable people ==
- Anthony Antoncich (1917–1998), Royal Air Force pilot, born in Keetmanshoop
- Dawid Bezuidenhout (1935–1998), first chairman of the Transitional Government of National Unity, born in Keetmanshoop
- Hellmut von Leipzig (1921–2016), combat driver of Erwin Rommel, born in Keetmanshoop
- John Ya-Otto (1938–1994), member of the Constituent Assembly of Namibia and former ambassador to Angola, grew up in Keetmanshoop
