= Yvette Abrahams =

South African farmer and activist

- Born: early 1960s Cape Town
- Education: University of Cape Town; Queen's University at Kingston
- Occupations: Organic farmer; Activist; Feminist scholar in South Africa
- Parents: Kenneth Abrahams (father); Ottilie Abrahams (mother)

Yvette Abrahams is an organic farmer, activist and feminist scholar in South Africa.

== Life ==
Yvette Abrahams was born in Cape Town in the early 1960s, the daughter of Namibian activists Ottilie Abrahams and Kenneth Abrahams. She grew up in exile in Zambia, England and Sweden. Returning to study at the University of Cape Town, she dropped out of university for some time to be an anti-apartheid activist. Abrahams gained her MA in history from Queen's University at Kingston, writing her dissertation on Khoisan resistance. In 2002 she gained a Ph.D. in economic history from the University of Cape Town, with a 2000 dissertation on Sarah Baartman.

== Works ==
- Was Eva raped? An exercise in speculative History, Kronos, No. 23 (November 1996), pp. 3–21. JSTOR 41056362
- The Great Long National Insult: 'Science', Sexuality and the Khoisan in the 18th And Early 19th Century, Agenda 13: 32 (1997)
- 'Images of Sarah Bartman: Sexuality, Race, and Gender in Early-Nineteenth-Century Britain', in Ruth Roach Pierson, Nupur Chaudhuri and Beth McAuley (eds.) Nation, Empire, Colony: Historicizing Gender and Race, Indiana University Press, 1998, pp. 220–
- 'Ambiguity is my middle name: A research diary', in Nomboniso Gasa (ed.) Women in South African History: They Remove Boulders and Cross Rivers, HSRC Press, 2007, pp. 421–
- (with Sharlene Khan, Pumla Dineo Gqola, Neelika Jayawardane and Betty Govinden) '“Thinking Through, Talking Back: Creative Theorisation as Sites of Praxis-Theory” – A creative dialogue between Sharlene Khan, Pumla Dineo Gqola, Yvette Abrahams, Neelika Jayawardane and Betty Govinden', Agenda 32:3 (2018), pp. 109–118.
