= FCPP =

FCPP may refer to:

- Frontier Centre for Public Policy, a Canadian think tank
- Federal Coloured People's Party, a Namibian political party
- FCPP, the ICAO airport code for Agostinho-Neto International Airport in the Republic of Congo
