= Andrew Matjila =

Namibian politician

Andrew Matjila (born 1932) is a Namibian politician. A member of the Democratic Turnhalle Alliance, Matjila took part in the Transitional Government of National Unity from 1985 to 1989 where he served as Minister of Education and Central Personnel. Matjila also was a member of the Constituent Assembly of Namibia and the 1st National Assembly of Namibia with the DTA.

| Preceded by Fanuel Kozonguizi | Chairman of the Transitional Government of National Unity of Namibia; June–September 1986 | Succeeded by Dirk Mudge |
| Preceded by Moses Katjiuongua | Chairman of the Transitional Government of National Unity of Namibia; April–July 1988 | Succeeded by Dirk Mudge |
| Preceded by Andreas Shipanga | Chairman of the Transitional Government of National Unity of Namibia; December 1988-January 1989 | Succeeded by Harry Booysen |
