= Hermanus Beukes =

Namibian politician (1913–2004)

- Born: June 20, 1913; Rehoboth, German South-West Africa
- Died: July 22, 2004 (aged 91); Rehoboth, Namibia
- Occupation(s): Politician, activist
- Known for: Kidnapping victim

Hermanus Christoffel Beukes (also known as Oom Maans Beukes) (born 20 June 1913 in Rehoboth, German South-West Africa – died 22 July 2004 in Rehoboth, Namibia) was a Coloured Namibian politician and activist. Beukes was a frequent petitioner of the United Nations because of Apartheid South Africa's actions while Namibia was held under its mandate.

== Abduction ==
Beukes was in a group of Namibians who fled to neighboring Botswana in 1963. Alongside Kenneth Abrahams, Andreas Shipanga and fellow Baster Paul Smit, the group fled the country because of their actions in recruiting soldiers for SWAPO's military wing, the People's Liberation Army of Namibia. South African agents in Botswana abducted the foursome and returned them to Namibia. Following international pressure regarding the illegality of state-sponsored kidnapping, South Africa returned the four to Botswana. Intending to travel to New York City to petition the United Nations for Namibia in person, Beukes could not adjust to the changed environment and returned to Rehoboth. In Rehoboth, Beukes was a shoemaker.

== See also ==
- List of kidnappings
