= National Independence Party =

National Independence Party may refer to:

- Azerbaijan National Independence Party, a political party in Azerbaijan
- National Independence Party (Belize), a defunct political party in Belize
- National Independence Party (Chechnya), a defunct political party in Chechnya
- Estonian National Independence Party, a defunct political party in Estonia, a predecessor of the Union of Pro Patria and Res Publica
- National Independence Party of Georgia, a defunct political party in Georgia
- National Independence Party (Ghana), a defunct political party in Ghana
- National Independence Party (Luxembourg)
- National Independence Party (Namibia), a defunct political party in Namibia
- National Independence Party (Nigeria), founded by Eyo Ita
- National Independence Party (United Kingdom), a defunct political party in the United Kingdom
- United National Independence Party, a political party in Zambia
