= Transitional Government of National Unity =

Transitional Government of National Unity may refer to:

- Transitional Government of National Unity (Chad), a government in Chad between 1979 and 1982
- Transitional Government of National Unity (Namibia), a government in South West Africa (Namibia) between 1985 and 1989
- Transitional Government of National Unity (South Sudan), a government in South Sudan formed in February 2020

== See also ==
- Government of National Unity
