= Dawid Bezuidenhout =

Namibian politician (1935–1998)

Dawid Bezuidenhout (7 September 1935, in Keetmanshoop – 7 August 1998, in Windhoek) was a teacher and politician in South West Africa (now Namibia).

A teacher by profession, Bezuidenhout entered politics in South West Africa in 1959 as the founding vice president of the South West Africa Coloured Organisation. In 1985, Bezuidenhout became the minister of transport of the Transitional Government of National Unity (TGNU), a puppet government of South Africa prior to Namibia's independence. The TGNU chairmanship operated under a quarterly rotational system, and Bezuidenhout was named the first chairman of the TGNU as transport minister. In 1987 he chaired the TNGU again for 3 months. Then a member of the Namibia's Labour Party, Bezuidenhout eventually became a founding member of the United Democratic Front from 1989 to 1995.

Dawid Bezuidenhout High School in Khomasdal is named after him.

Bezuidenhout retired from politics in 1995 and died on 7 August 1998 in Windhoek.

Preceded by position founded	Chairman of the Transitional Government of National Unity of Namibia; June–September 1985	Succeeded by Hans Diergaardt
Preceded by Andreas Shipanga	Chairman of the Transitional Government of National Unity of Namibia; May–July 1987	Succeeded by Jan de Wet
