= Yu Chi Chan Club =

The Yu Chi Chan Club was a minor militant anti-apartheid organisation which operated within South Africa. Founded in July 1962, its members included Neville Alexander, Dulcie September, Elizabeth van der Heyden, Ottilie Abrahams, Kenneth Abrahams, Fikile Bam and Andreas Shipinga.

Nelson Mandela of the African National Congress met with members of the Club who were imprisoned alongside him on Robben Island during the 1960s, hoping to build a united anti-apartheid front.
