= Native Namibians =

Native Namibians may refer to:

- Bantu peoples
- Khoisans
- Coloured people in Namibia
