= Jennifer Van den Heever =

Namibian politician (born 1962)

MP Jennifer Van Den Heever
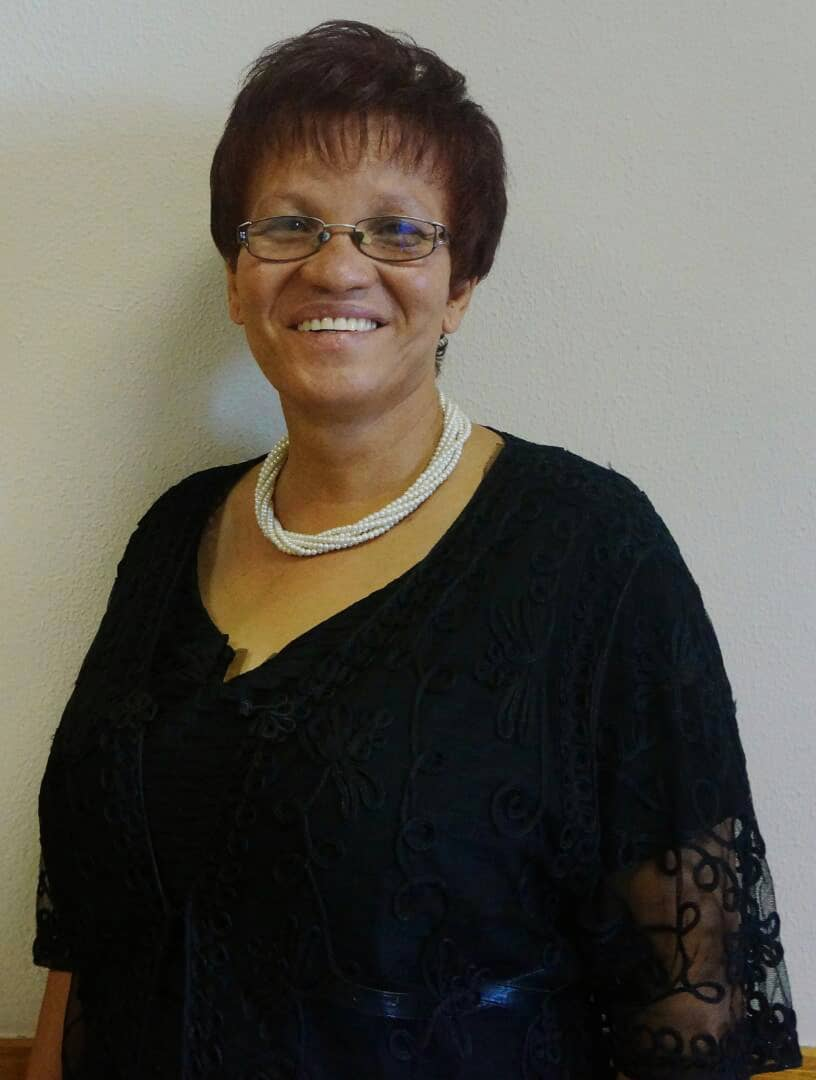
- van den Heever at the 2019 opening of the Parliament of Namibia

Member of the National Assembly of Namibia
- Incumbent
- Assumed office 20 March 2015

Personal details
- Born: Namibia

Jennifer Muriel Van Den Heever (born 21 January 1962) is a Namibian politician. She currently serves as chief whip of the official opposition, the Popular Democratic Movement in the parliament of Namibia. She was elected to parliament in 2014 and has served on various parliamentary committees.

== Political career and early life ==
Van den Heever was born in South West Africa in 1962. She obtained her standard 10 in 1979 and is currently a member of the Parliamentary Standing Committees on Human Resources and Community Development.
