= Namibia Christian Democratic Party =

- Leader: Hans Röhr
- Honorary President: Wolfgang Adam
- Founded: 1978
- Headquarters: Kavango
- Ideology: Christian democracy

The Namibia Christian Democratic Party was a political party in Namibia, led by Hans Röhr. It was founded in 1978 in Kavango. Wolfgang Adam was the honorary president of the party.

The party participated in the 1978 South West African Legislative Assembly elections, and won 2.8 percent of the votes.

== See also ==
- List of political parties in Namibia
