= Mmabatho People's Party =

The Mmabatho People's Party (MPP) was a political party in South West Africa, today's Namibia. It was formed in 1986 after a split in the Tshwana communal party, Seoposengwe Party. The MPP was led by Michael Simana.
