= Seoposengwe Party =

The Seoposengwe Party was a political party in Namibia, representing the Tswana minority in rural eastern Namibia. The party emerged from the Tswana Alliance, a group participating at the Turnhalle Constitutional Conference in Windhoek between 1975 and 1977.

In 1980 the Tswana Alliance was renamed Seoposengwe Party, and joined the Democratic Turnhalle Alliance in the same year. Its only leader was Constance Kgosiemang, paramount chief of the Tswana. Deputy party president during this time was Gregory Tibinyane.

In February 1981 the Ipelegeng Democratic Party (IDP) split off under the leadership of Gates Mootseng. A further split in 1986 resulted in the formation of the Mmabatho People's Party, led by Michael Simana.
