= Voice of the People Party (Namibia) =

Former political party in Namibia

The Voice of the People Party was a political party in Namibia. The party was led by Kephes Conradie. In 1972, it joined the National Convention. Later it joined the Namibia National Front (NNF). In 1978, the party and other factions broke away from NNF and formed the Namibia People's Liberation Front.
