= Otto Schimming =

Namibian educator

Personal details
- Born: Otto Ferdinand Schimming; 19 November 1908 Gobabis, German South West Africa (now Namibia)
- Died: 7 December 2005 (aged 97)
- Spouse(s): Charlotte Schimming, née Freiser

Otto Ferdinand Schimming (19 November 1908 – 7 December 2005) was a Namibian teacher and early independence activist. He was the first black teacher in Namibia when he founded the Rietquelle School in Aminuis. A street in Katutura is named after him.

== Personal ==
The son of a German Schutztruppe soldier and a Herero mother, Schimming was born in 1908 during imperial German rule of Namibia. His parents divorced in 1918 when the South African authorities, having conquered the area during World War I, voided interracial marriage in the territory. Schimming and his brother then moved to a farm near Otjivero where he lived with Clemens Kapuuo's sister. By the age of 10, Schimming could speak three languages.

In 1940, Schimming married Charlotte Frier, a Damara-speaker and lived with her and their three children in the Old Location of Windhoek. Shortly after the marriage, the couple had their fourth child and they soon moved to a series of different farms across the country, including ones in Grootfontein, Gobabis, Rehoboth, Seeis, Windhoek and Okahandja before settling near Witvlei - where three of his surviving daughters are still farming today. All of Schimming's children received post-secondary education in South Africa, causing suspicion of thievery by the White South African authorities and regular raids of the household in search of stolen diamonds.

During the Old Location massacre on 10 December 1959, Schimming and his wife were in Cape Town attending the graduation of his son and son-in-law who are medical doctors. In 1963, after his daughter Ottilie Abrahams and her husband Kenneth Abrahams had moved to Rehoboth in 1962, he took his son-in-law and others to hide away in caves, after nearly being arrested by the South Africans for their political activities, on his farm in the Rehoboth area before transporting them to Botswana. He was the father of politician Nora Schimming-Chase.

Schimming died on 7 December 2005 and is buried at De Rus (or Schimmings Rust) on the family farm near Rehoboth. At the time of his death, he was survived by three children, 17 grandchildren and 13 great-grandchildren.

== Teaching and activism ==
He received an education from missionaries and eventually studied education at Lovedale Mission Station in South Africa. Upon completing his education at Lovedale, Schimming returned to South West Africa and was urged by Chief Hosea Kutako to start a school for Herero-speaking children in Aminuis. The Rietquelle School was founded and for a time, Schimming was the school's only teacher. In the first year, Schimming taught 150 pupils, In the afternoons he would build structures where the children could stay. He also acquired a rifle which he would hunt for meat during weekends to supply food for the children. During this time he found himself before a magistrate in Gobabis for shooting wild dogs and was fined one shilling and a six pence. He was also an advisor to the Herero Chiefs' Council and secretary to Kutako. In that position, Schimming drafted the first letter to the United Nations protesting the proposed formal incorporation of the then South West Africa into South Africa. Two years later, Schimming was hired as the chief translator for Windhoek's municipality because of his skill with languages. He could speak Afrikaans, German, Damara and Nama, Herero, Oshiwambo, English, Xhosa and Latin. In 1962, he accompanied international inspectors to Namibia as a translator to inspect the conditions in the country and report back to the United Nations.
