= Damara Executive Committee =

Former Namibian political party

The Damara Executive Committee was a political party in Namibia, based amongst the Damara people. DEC was founded by a group of people based in the Damara Tribal Executive Committee (DTEC), which was not a political party as such. DEC soon became dormant, but was revived in 1960 by Josephat Gawanab.

In 1968 Josephat Gawanab became the president of DEC. In 1971 Gawanab, together with Justus ǁGaroëb from the Damara Council, were appointed leaders of the Dama people by the South African occupation authorities.

In 1977 DEC joined the Namibia National Front. In 1978 it left the NNF and joined the Namibia People's Liberation Front.
