= Hellmut von Leipzig =

Knight's Cross recipient (1921–2016)

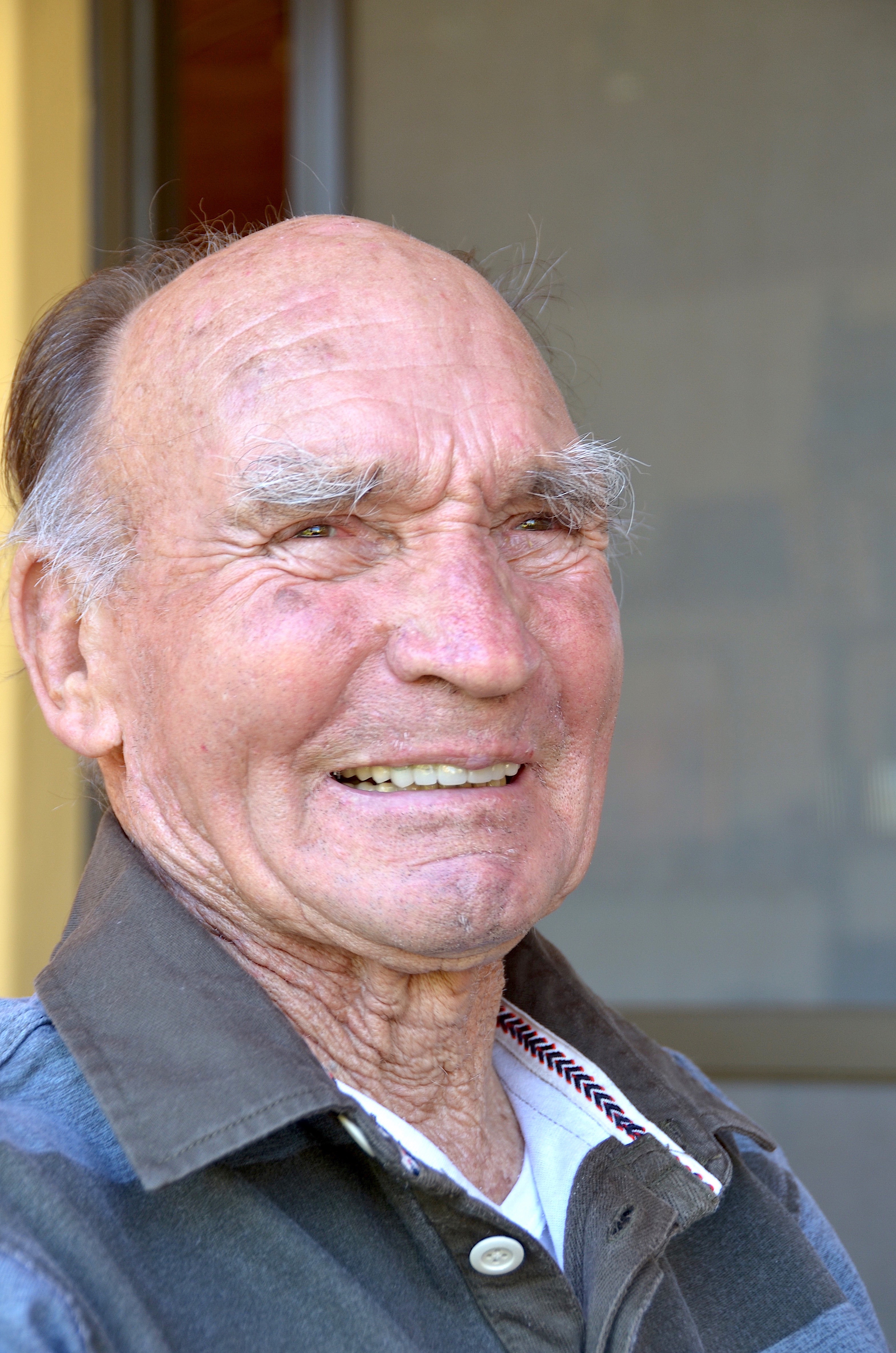
- Leipzig in 2014
- Born: 18 July 1921; Keetmanshoop, South West Africa
- Died: 24 October 2016 (aged 95); Namibia
- Military career
- Allegiance: Nazi Germany
- Branch: Army
- Service years: 1939–45
- Rank: Leutnant of the Reserves
- Unit: Afrika Korps
- Conflicts: World War II: Battle of El Alamein; Battle of Tobruk; Battle of Berlin
- Awards: Knight's Cross of the Iron Cross

Hellmut von Leipzig (18 July 1921 — 24 October 2016) was an officer (Leutnant) of the Brandenburgers in the Wehrmacht. He was the combat driver of Generalfeldmarschall Erwin Rommel in the North African campaign in World War II. Von Leipzig was a recipient of the Knight's Cross of the Iron Cross of Nazi Germany. Following the war, von Leipzig became involved in leadership roles in the German-speaking community in Namibia.

== Biography ==
Von Leipzig was born in South West Africa, son of a naval officer. In 1941, he volunteered for the Afrika Korps. He became driver to Generalfeldmarschall Erwin Rommel, whom von Leipzig describes as "the craziest passenger ever", because he always said "Faster!" and when encountering an enemy's minefield, would insist on going and personally guiding Leipzig around the mines. Von Leipzig fought in the Battle of Berlin, became a prisoner of war in 1945 and spent 10 years in Soviet captivity.

In later life he resided in Namibia, where he founded the German Cultural Council, the largest organisation of the German-speaking community in Namibia. He chaired the organisation from 1986 to 1997. He also sat on the board of The Association of German School Societies in Namibia (AGDS). Von Leipzig died in Namibia in October 2016 at the age of 95.

== Awards ==
- Knight's Cross of the Iron Cross on 28 April 1945 as Leutnant of the Reserves and Zugführer (platoon leader) in the Panzer-Aufklärungs-Abteilung "Brandenburg"
- Order of Saint John (Bailiwick of Brandenburg)
