= SWAPO Democrats =

- Abbreviation: SWAPO-D
- President: Andreas Shipanga
- Secretary-General: Ottilie Abrahams
- Founded: 10 June 1978
- Dissolved: 1991
- Split from: SWAPO

The SWAPO Democrats, also known as SWAPO-D, was a political party formed from a break within the South West Africa People's Organization in 1978. Formed in Sweden on 10 June 1978, the party was led by former leading SWAPO members Andreas Shipanga (President), Kenneth Abrahams, Ottilie Abrahams (Secretary-General), and Emil Appolus in response to a major party split within SWAPO which resulted in the forced detention of Shipanga and Solomon Mfifma during the 1975-76 SWAPO crisis, also known as the "Shipanga Rebellion".

SWAPO-D were generally seen by SWAPO as traitors and collaborators with the apartheid regime. However, they were still following a comparable political course, boycotting the 1975–1977 Turnhalle Constitutional Conference and the resulting 1978 legislative elections. In the mid-1980s SWAPO-D joined the Transitional Government, in which all parties swore an allegiance to the Republic of South Africa. In the 1989 elections, SWAPO-D failed to win a seat, obtaining 3,161 votes and was disbanded in 1991.
