= Nora Schimming-Chase =

Namibian politician

Nora Schimming-Chase (1 December 1940 – 13 March 2018) was a Namibian politician and Namibia's first ambassador to Germany from 1992 to 1996. After changing her party membership from South West Africa National Union (SWANU) to Congress of Democrats (CoD), Schimming-Chase became a member of the National Assembly of Namibia from 2000 to 2010.

== Early life and education ==
Nora Schimming was born in Windhoek's Old Location on 1 December 1940. She was the daughter of Charlotte Schimming, née Freiser, and Otto Schimming, the first Black teacher in Namibia and an early independence activist. Because both her parents had a German father and were thus mixed-race, she was classified as "Coloured" by the authorities, and could not attend high school in South West Africa. She was sent to Cape Town instead and attended Trafalgar School. Schimming then attended University of Cape Town and graduated with a teacher diploma in 1961. The educator, activist, and politician Ottilie Abrahams was her prior sister.

Schimming went into exile in Tanzania in 1962 and worked at the SWAPO office in Dar es Salaam for a few months. She then moved to Germany, having been awarded a bursary to study at the Free University of Berlin. She graduated in 1966 with a B.A. in political science, English linguistics and African literature, and in 1968 with a Magister degree in politics and African studies. She also started with a PhD but never finished it. In 1974 she returned to Tanzania and headed the office of the South West Africa National Union (SWANU). At that time she worked as a teacher at the International School of Tanganyika in Dar-es-Salaam. In 1978 she returned to Namibia.

== Career ==
Schimming-Chase was elected deputy secretary-general of SWANU upon her return to Namibia in 1978. In 1982 she was elected vice-president. At that time she worked as director of education at the Council of Churches in Namibia (CCN). Prior to Namibian independence Schimming-Chase worked as deputy director of inter-church aid, refugees and world service at the World Council of Churches in Geneva. Upon independence she again returned to Namibia and worked first for the Namibia National Front, and then at the Ministry of Foreign Affairs.

Schimming-Chase was appointed ambassador to Germany, with additional accreditation for Austria, in 1992 and served until 1996. Thereafter she worked as deputy permanent secretary at the Ministry of Foreign Affairs. She went on early retirement in 1999, was one of the founders of the Congress of Democrats (CoD), and became a CoD member of parliament after the 1999 Namibian general election. She was re-elected in 2004. After the dismal performance of the CoD in the 2009 election, Schimming-Chase retired from politics.

== Private life and recognition ==
Schimming married West Indian William McDonald Chase in 1966. The couple had two daughters, Esi and Afra, both born in Germany, and a son Kweku, born in Dar-es-Salaam. Her daughter, Afra, continued the family lineage with the birth of her first grandson, Néo. Subsequently, her son Kweku expanded the family by welcoming three additional grandchildren: Malaika, Aisha, and Khemmet.

For her contribution to the good relationship between Germany and Namibia, Schimming-Chase was awarded the Great Cross of Merit of the Federal Republic of Germany in 1997. Namibia awarded her with the Most Distinguished Order of Namibia: First Class on Heroes' Day 2014. She died on 13 March 2018.
