= Guilliam Visagie =

Fugitive and first white settler in Namibia

Guilliam Visagie (born about 1751; still alive in 1793) was a fugitive from the Dutch Cape Colony who fled to southern Namibia in about 1786. He is considered to have been the first person of European ancestry to have settled in the country.

Visagie was born about 1751 in the Dutch Cape Colony, likely to parents of Huguenot descent. He became a farmer in the area near the Olifants River. In 1780, he was found guilty of killing a Nama and wounding two others. To escape punishment by the Dutch East India Company, he and his wife moved north of the Orange River.

In 1785, Guilliam and his wife Elsabe Visagie settled in the area of today's Keetmanshoop, then named ǂNuǂgoaes. Visagie translated the name as Modderfontein, 'Mud Spring', becoming the first European to permanently settle in Namibia. The translation later changed to Swartmodder, 'Black Mud'. Visagie farmed and traded firearms to the Namas for cattle. In 1793, he withdrew from his farm after a clash with Afrikaner Oorlams commandos, who were apparently acting on orders from the Dutch East India Company.
