= Eagle Monument, Keetmanshoop =

Eagle Monument
- German: Adlerdenkmal
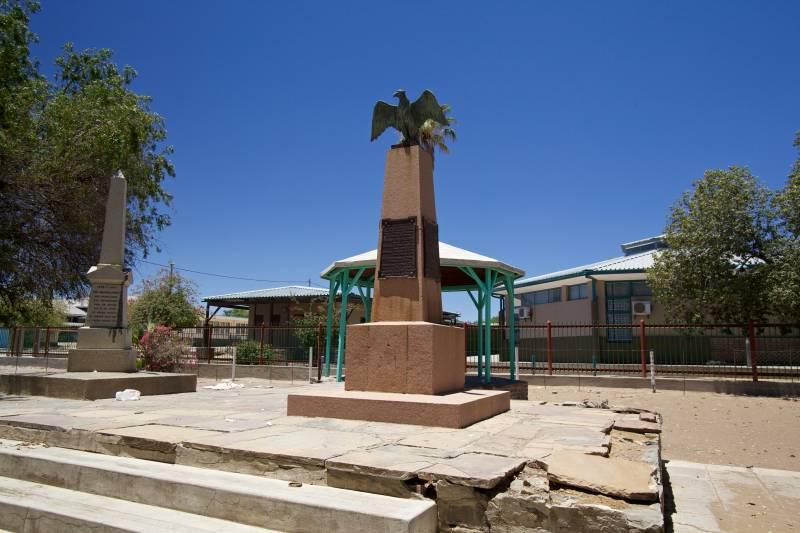
- Location: Keetmanshoop, Namibia
- Coordinates: 26°34′44″S 18°08′05″E
- Opening date: after 1907

The Eagle Monument (German: Adlerdenkmal) is a war memorial in Keetmanshoop, in the ǁKaras Region of Namibia. It was designated a National Monument of Namibia on 1 August 1967.

== Description ==
Situated near the Old Post Office Building, the monument is in the shape of an obelisk, crowned with a bronze German Imperial Eagle. It is dedicated to fallen German soldiers (Schutztruppe) in the Herero and Nama wars of 1897, 1903, and 1906–1907. The date of its installation is unknown.

In the past, commemorations were held by the memorial each November, during which the fallen in both World Wars were remembered. Occasionally, an adjacent bandstand provided music, performed by a local Nama brass band.
