= Namibia Democratic Turnhalle Party =

Political party in Namibia

Namibia Democratic Turnhalle Party was a political party in Namibia. It was led by Daniël Luipert. NDTP was a party supported by the Nama people of Namibia and evolved from the Nama Alliance, the name was chosen in reference to the Turnhalle Constitutional Conference of 1975–1977. NDTP was a founding member of the Democratic Turnhalle Alliance.
