= Damara Christian Democratic Party =

The Damara Christian Democratic Party was a political party in Namibia, initially known as the Damara Action Group. The party was formed in 1978, when the future independent country of Namibia was known as South West Africa. The party was led by Theophelus Arend.

The DAG had joined the Action Front for the Retention of Turnhalle Principles (ACTUR), however in 1979, it withdrew from ACTUR. It later joined the Namibia People's Liberation Front, but withdrew in 1986.
