= Jakob Marengo Secondary School =

JMTC: Namibia

Address
- Mungunda Street; Windhoek; Namibia

Information
- Other name: Jacob Marengo Tutorial College
- Established: 1985; 40 years ago
- Founder: Ottilie Abrahams

Jacob Marengo Tutorial College (JMTC) also known as Jacob Marengo Senior Secondary School in Namibia, located at Mungunda Street in Katutura, Windhoek

== History ==
Founded by Ottilie Abrahams in 1985, Jacob Marengo Tutorial College is located in Windhoek, Namibia. It was established to cater to Namibian youth who were too old to attend traditional high school but had the ambition to complete their secondary education. Today, JMTC accepts students of all ages.

== Vision ==
JMTC encourages adult students to complete their academic endeavors and prepares them to enter universities in Namibia as well as abroad. JMTC has plans to embark on service learning and broaden student awareness of global technology.
