= Anthony Antoncich =

Recipient of the Distinguished Flying Medal

- Born: 17 October 1917; Keetmanshoop, South West Africa
- Died: 5 October 1998 (aged 80)
- Military career
- Rank: Pilot Officer
- Conflicts: Second World War

Anthony Mark Antoncich DFM (17 October 1917 – 5 October 1998) was a member of the Royal Air Force in the Second World War. He was awarded the Distinguished Flying Medal in 1943 for service in West Africa. The award was officially presented on 11 June 1953 in Rhodesia by the Governor of Northern Rhodesia. The award was made for two separate attacks on U-boat submarines in difficult conditions.

Born at Keetmanshoop, South West Africa, he attended Selborne College, East London, South Africa. In 1939, Anthony was living in Umtali, Rhodesia when he joined the Rhodesian Air Force at Salisbury and was subsequently drafted into the Royal Air Force in 1941.
