= Namibia People's Liberation Front =

The Namibia People's Liberation Front was an alliance of moderate political parties formed, in 1978, in Namibia (then known as South West Africa). The alliance was formed by the Voice of the People Party, the Damara Executive Committee and the Bondelswarts Council. The Damara Christian Democratic Party joined the NPLF in 1979, but withdrew in 1986.
