= Popular Democratic Movement =

Political party in Namibia

- Abbreviation: PDM
- President: McHenry Venaani
- Vice President: Jennifer Van den Heever
- Chairperson: Ricky Vries
- Secretary-General: Manuel Ngaringombe
- Treasurer: Nico Smit
- Founders: Clemens Kapuuo; Dirk Mudge
- Founded: 5 November 1977; 49 years ago
- Headquarters: 14 Mozart Street; Windhoek; Khomas Region
- Youth wing: PDM Youth League
- Women's wing: PDM Women's League
- Ideology: Conservatism; Liberal conservatism Economic liberalism
- Political position: Centre-right
- International affiliation: International Democrat Union (Associate member)
- Regional Affiliation: Democrat Union of Africa
- Colors: Blue; White; Red
- Slogan: Let's move!
- Seats in the National Assembly: 5 / 104
- Seats in the National Council: 2 / 42
- Regional Councillors: 2 / 121
- Local Councillors: 41 / 378
- Pan-African Parliament: 0 / 5

Website
- www.pdmnamibia.com

The Popular Democratic Movement (PDM), formerly Democratic Turnhalle Alliance (DTA), is an amalgamation of political parties in Namibia, registered as one singular party for representation purposes. In coalition with the United Democratic Front, it formed the official opposition in Parliament until the 2009 parliamentary elections. The party currently holds five seats in the Namibian National Assembly and one seat in the Namibian National Council. Further, the PDM lost its status as the official opposition party, taking the fourth place. McHenry Venaani is the President of the PDM.

The PDM is an associate member of the International Democracy Union, a transnational grouping of national political parties generally identified with political conservatism, and a member of the Democracy Union of Africa (DUA), which was re-launched in Accra, Ghana in February 2019. PDM President McHenry Venaani is the current chairperson of the DUA.

== History ==
The party was formed as the Democratic Turnhalle Alliance (DTA) on 5 November 1977 as a result of the Turnhalle Constitutional Conference held in Windhoek from 1975 to 1977 as a counterbalance and main opposition to the South West Africa People's Organization (SWAPO). The DTA comprised several ethnically based parties, including the South West African Labour Party, Rehoboth Baster Association (renamed Rehoboth DTA Party), National Unity Democratic Organization (NUDO), South West Africa People's Democratic United Front (SWAP-DUF), Nama Alliance (renamed Namibia Democratic Turnhalle Party), Republican Party, National Democratic Party, National Democratic Unity Party, Tswana Alliance (later renamed Seoposengwe Party), and Caprivi Alliance Party.

Participants of the Constitutional Conference walked out of the Constitutional Committee over the National Party's insistence on retaining apartheid legislation in the new constitution. Both the conference and DTA were named after the Turnhalle building (German for old Turners hall) in Windhoek where the conference was held.

The DTA won the 1978 South West African legislative election by a landslide, claiming 41 of the 50 seats. This was largely due to "widespread intimidation" and the presence of South African troops, particularly in the north of the territory. The subsequent interim government, consisting of a National Assembly and a Council of Ministers, lasted until 18 January 1983 when, due to continued interference by the South African Administrator-General the Council of Ministers resigned. On 18 January 1983, South Africa accepted the dissolution of both the legislative and the executive body without elections being scheduled, and again assumed full administrative authority over South West Africa. This void lasted until 17 June 1985 when the Transitional Government of National Unity (TGNU) was installed by the South African Administrator-General. Its legislative and executive actions were subject to South African approval, with newly appointed administrator-general Louis Pienaar having the veto right on all legislation to be passed. The TGNU was widely perceived as a largely powerless body that sought moderate reform but was unable to secure recognition by the United Nations.

The DTA dominated this government, too, albeit not with absolute majority: In the 62-seat National Assembly the DTA occupied 22, and five smaller parties got 8 seats each. On 1 March 1989, the TGNU was suspended along the terms of United Nations Security Council Resolution 435 for it to give way to an independent government, determined by the November 1989 parliamentary elections. SWAPO won the elections, the DTA came distant second.

After Namibian independence the DTA lost several of its former affiliates. The Republican Party, the National Unity Democratic Organisation (NUDO), and the Action for Democratic Change all left the alliance in 2003, citing various grievances. The DTA's past affiliation with the apartheid government before Namibian independence continues to affect its current public image.

On 4 November 2017, one day before its 40th anniversary, the party was renamed the Popular Democratic Movement (PDM) in order to facilitate modernisation and to shed its "colonial" name.

The party did well in 2019 election, scoring 16.65% (their best performance since 1989) and winning 16 seats in the National Assembly.

== Leadership ==
Upon its foundation, Clemens Kapuuo became the first president of the party, and Dirk Mudge served as chairman. After Kapuuo's assassination in 1978 Cornelius Ndjoba became president on 3 July. The position of the vice-president was established on that day with Ben Africa as first incumbent.

Mishake Muyongo led the party through the early years of independence, and in the 1994 presidential election he placed second, behind President Sam Nujoma, with 23.08% of the vote. After Muyongo expressed support for Caprivi secession in 1998, he and the party he represented in the alliance, the United Democratic Party, was suspended from the DTA in August 1998 at an extraordinary meeting of the party's executive committee. Muyongo fled Namibia and was replaced as DTA President by Katuutire Kaura, who called for Muyongo to be brought back and put on trial. Kaura served for three elective terms. In September 2013, he was defeated by McHenry Venaani.

== Member parties of the PDM ==
=== Founding members ===
The following parties participated at the Turnhalle Constitutional Conference and subsequently formed the Democratic Turnhalle Alliance:

- Bushman Alliance (BA)
- Christian Democratic Party (CDP), itself a merger of a Christian Democrat Union (CDU, Coloured) breakaway faction, the Progressive People's Party, and the Namibia Volksparty
- National Democratic Unity Party (NDUP), composed of conference members from Kavango
- Caprivi delegation
- Namibia Democratic Turnhalle Party (NDTP)
- National Democratic Party (NDP)
- National Unity Democratic Organization (NUDO), withdrawn from DTA in September 2003
- Rehoboth DTA Party (RDTAP), formerly the Rehoboth Baster Association (RBA)
- Republican Party (RP)
- Tswana Alliance, later Seoposengwe Party (Tswana)
- South West African Labour Party
- South West Africa People's Democratic United Front (SWAP-DUF), a breakaway faction of the Damara Council

=== Later changes of membership ===
- United Democratic Party (UDP), member of the DTA since UDP's foundation in 1985, expelled from DTA in 1998 due to its support of the secession of the Caprivi.
- In September 2003, the National Unity Democratic Organization (NUDO) withdrew from the DTA, accusing the party of failing to work for Herero interests.

== Electoral history ==
=== Presidential elections ===
Election	Party candidate	Votes	%	Result
1994	Mishake Muyongo	114,843	23.66%	Lost ✗
1999	Katuutire Kaura	52,752	9.79%	Lost ✗
2004	Katuutire Kaura	41,905	5.12%	Lost ✗
2009	Katuutire Kaura	24,186	2.98%	Lost ✗
2014	McHenry Venaani	44,271	4.97%	Lost ✗
2019	McHenry Venaani	43,959	5.30%	Lost ✗
2024	McHenry Venaani	55,412	5.04%	Lost ✗

=== National Assembly elections ===
Election	Party leader	Votes	%	Seats	+/–	Position	Result
1978	Cornelius Ndjoba	268,130	82.18%	41 / 50	New	▲1st	Supermajority government
1989	Mishake Muyongo	191,532	28.55%	21 / 72	▼20	▼2nd	Opposition
1994	Mishake Muyongo	101,748	20.78%	15 / 72	▼6	2nd	Opposition
1999	Katuutire Kaura	50,824	9.48%	7 / 78	▼8	▼3rd	Opposition
2004	Katuutire Kaura	42,070	5.14%	4 / 78	▼3	3rd	Opposition
2009	Katuutire Kaura	25,393	3.13%	2 / 72	▼2	3rd	Opposition
2014	McHenry Venaani	42,933	4.80%	5 / 104	▲3	▲2nd	Opposition
2019	McHenry Venaani	136,576	16.65%	16 / 104	▲11	2nd	Opposition
2024	McHenry Venaani	59,839	5.48%	5 / 104	▼11	▼4th	Opposition

=== National Council elections ===
Election	Seats	+/–	Position	Result
1992	6 / 26	New	▲2nd	Opposition
1998	4 / 26	▼2	2nd	Opposition
2004	1 / 26	▼3	2nd	Opposition
2010	1 / 26	0	2nd	Opposition
2015	1 / 42	0	2nd	Opposition
2020	2 / 42	▲1	▼3rd	Opposition

== Notes ==
=== Literature ===
- "Democratic Elections in Namibia. An International Experiment in Nation Building" (PDF). National Democratic Institute for International Affairs. June 1989. p. 12.
