= Namibia Independence Party =

Former political party in Namibia

The Namibia Independence Party, initially known as the National Independence Party, was a political party in Namibia (formerly South West Africa). In 1975, the NIP joined the Turnhalle Constitutional Conference. Later, the party joined the Namibia National Front.

In 1981, the party's name was changed to the Namibia Independence Party.
