= 1977 South West African Turnhalle Plan referendum =

Referendum on draft constitution

A referendum on the Turnhalle plan was held in South West Africa on 18 May 1977. In the Whites-only referendum, the draft constitution was approved by 94.69% of voters. However, following pressure from the United Nations Security Council, the constitution was never enacted.

== Results ==
Choice	Votes	%
For	30,329	94.69
Against		5.31
Invalid/blank votes		–
Total		100
Eligible voters/turnout	51,975	64.90
Source: Direct Democracy
