= Caprivi Alliance Party =

Political party in Namibia

- Dissolved: 1985
- Merged into: United Democratic Party (1985)

The Caprivi Alliance Party was a political party in Namibia. In September 1985, the party merged into the United Democratic Party.

== See also ==
- List of political parties in Namibia
