= Transitional Government of National Unity (Namibia) =

1985-1989 government of Namibia as South Africa withdrew

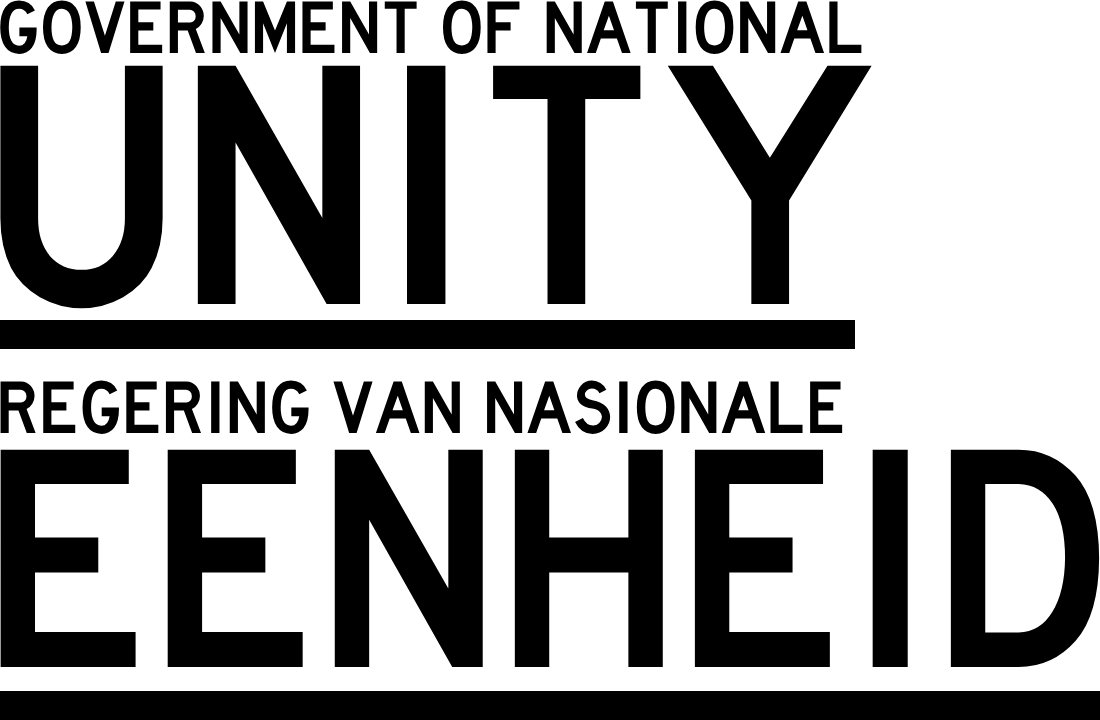

Type
- Type: Provisional government of South West Africa

History
- Founded: 17 June 1985
- Disbanded: 28 February 1989

Leadership
- Administrator-General: Louis Pienaar
- Speaker of the National Assembly: Johannes Skrywer
- Chairman of the Cabinet of Ministers: List

Meeting place
- Tintenpalast, Windhoek

The Transitional Government of National Unity (TGNU) (Afrikaans: Oorgangsregering van Nasionale Eenheid (ORNE)), was an interim government for South West Africa (Namibia) between June 1985 to February 1989.

== Background ==
Following the 1975–1977 Turnhalle Constitutional Conference, the first multiracial elections were held in the occupied territory in 1978, and a National Assembly as well as a Ministers' Council was constituted. Dirk Mudge became chairman of the Ministers' Council. Already in 1972 the United Nations had decreed SWAPO to be the "sole legitimate representative" of Namibia's people, but SWAPO was not invited to the Turnhalle conference and boycotted the subsequent elections. The United Nations Security Council consequently declared the election null and void, and the interim government illegitimate.

Following interference by the South African Administrator-General the Council of Ministers resigned, and on 18 January 1983 South Africa accepted the dissolution of both the legislative and the executive body without elections being scheduled, and again assumed full administrative authority over South West Africa.

The subsequent void was filled by South African administrators. Willie van Niekerk was appointed administrator-general for South West Africa and Jan F Greebe became chief executive officer. A Judicial Commission was appointed. Urged by United Nations Security Council Resolution 532 to speed up the process of releasing the territory into independence, a State Council was established in May 1983. In September this Council was obsoleted by the establishment of the Multi-Party Conference (MPC) which consisted of 19 parties but again excluded SWAPO. The MPC issued the Windhoek Declaration of Basic Principles in 1984 and the Bill of Fundamental Rights and Objectives, wherein the establishment of a Transitional Government of National Unity is requested from the South African administration, in 1985.

== Establishment ==
On 17 June 1985, the Transitional Government of National Unity was established by the South African Administrator-General through the promulgation of "the South West Africa Legislative and Executive Authority Establishment Proclamation, 1985" (Proclamation R.101 of 1985). Its legislative and executive actions were subject to South African approval, with newly appointed administrator-general Louis Pienaar having the veto right on all legislation to be passed. The TGNU was perceived as a client government of South Africa that sought moderate reform but was unable to secure recognition by the United Nations.

== Structure ==
The interim government consisted of a 62-seat National Assembly and an 8-seat Council of Ministers.

The assembly was dominated by the Democratic Turnhalle Alliance (DTA), then an alliance of ethnically based political parties. However, the position of the DTA was not as strong as in the previous assembly after the 1978 elections where it occupied 41 out of the 50 seats. This time, the five smaller parties could easily outvote the DTA.

=== National Assembly ===
The 62 seats in the National Assembly were allocated such that the Democratic Turnhalle Alliance (DTA) had 22, and five smaller parties got 8 seats each: South West African Labour Party (LP), the National Party of South West Africa (NP), the Rehoboth Free Democratic Party, the South West Africa National Union (SWANU), and the SWAPO Democrats (SWAPO-D). Johannes Skrywer of the DTA, who had been Speaker of the previous assembly established in 1978, was elected as the Speaker of the new assembly.

The composition of the National Assembly was as follows:

Political party	Seats
Democratic Turnhalle Alliance	22
South West African Labour Party	8
National Party of South West Africa	8
Rehoboth Free Democratic Party	8
South West Africa National Union	8
SWAPO Democrats	8

=== Council of Ministers ===
The 8 member Council of Ministers of the TGNU was chaired on a three-month rotational basis by its members.

==== Chairs ====
Dates	Chairman	Ministerial portfolio	Party
17 June 1985 — 16 September 1985	Dawid Bezuidenhout	Transport	Labour Party
17 September 1985 — 16 December 1985	Hans Diergaardt	Local Authorities and Civic Affairs	Rehoboth Free Democratic Party
17 December 1985 — 16 March 1986	Moses Katjikuru Katjiuongua	Manpower, National Health and Welfare	SWANU
17 March 1986 — 16 June 1986	Fanuel Kozonguizi	Justice, Information, Post and Telecommunication	Democratic Turnhalle Alliance
17 June 1986 — 16 September 1986	Andrew Matjila	Education and Central Personnel Institution	Democratic Turnhalle Alliance
17 September 1986 — 16 December 1986	Dirk Mudge	Finance and Government Affairs	Democratic Turnhalle Alliance
17 December 1986 — 31 January 1987	Ebenezer van Zijl	Agriculture, Water Affairs and Fisheries	South West National Party
1 February 1987 — 30 April 1987	Andreas Shipanga	Nature Conservation, Mining, Commerce and Tourism	SWAPO Democrats
1 May 1987 — 31 July 1987	Dawid Bezuidenhout	Transport	Labour Party of Namibia
1 August 1987 — 17 January 1988	Jan de Wet		South West National Party
18 January 1988 — 17 April 1988	Moses Katjikuru Katjiuongua	Manpower, National Health and Welfare	South West African National Union
18 April 1988 — 17 July 1988	Andrew Matjila	Education and Central Personnel Institution	Democratic Turnhalle Alliance
18 July 1988 — 17 October 1988	Dirk Mudge	Finance and Government Affairs	Democratic Turnhalle Alliance
18 October 1988 — December 1988	Andreas Shipanga	Nature Conservation, Mining, Commerce and Tourism	SWAPO Democrats
December 1988 — January 1989	Andrew Matjila	Education and Central Personnel Institution	Democratic Turnhalle Alliance
January 1989 — 28 February 1989	Harry Booysen		Labour Party of Namibia

== End of the TGNU ==
The Transitional Government of National Unity was suspended on 28 February 1989 following the signing of a peace agreement the previous year. As stipulated by United Nations Security Council Resolution 435, a United Nations Transition Assistance Group (UNTAG) was deployed on 1 April 1989. Elections to a Constituent Assembly were held in November 1989 and the territory became independent as the Republic of Namibia on 21 March 1990.
