= Kenneth Abrahams =

Namibian activist and physician (1936–2017)

- Born: Kenneth Godfrey Abrahams; 1936
- Died: 2017 (aged 80–81)

Kenneth Godfrey Abrahams (1936–2017) was a Namibian activist and physician.

He was born in Cape Town and studied at the University of Cape Town. Abrahams later earned his MD in Stockholm. He became active in SWAPO politics in 1960 along with his wife Ottilie Abrahams. He became identified with the guerrilla group, Yu Chi Chan Club who was started by Neville Alexander, and attempted to flee to Botswana. The South African police arrested him and his associates there, but the South African Government released him due to lack of jurisdiction. After a stint in Tanzania, Abrahams formed the SWAPO Democrats with his wife in Sweden. He campaigned for the Namibia National Front during the 1989 elections. In 1991, Abrahams opened a medical practice in Khomasdal.

== See also ==
- List of kidnappings
