= Khomasdal =

- Location within Namibia
- Coordinates: 22°32′28″S 17°6′30″E
- Country: Namibia
- Time zone: UTC+2 (South African Standard Time)

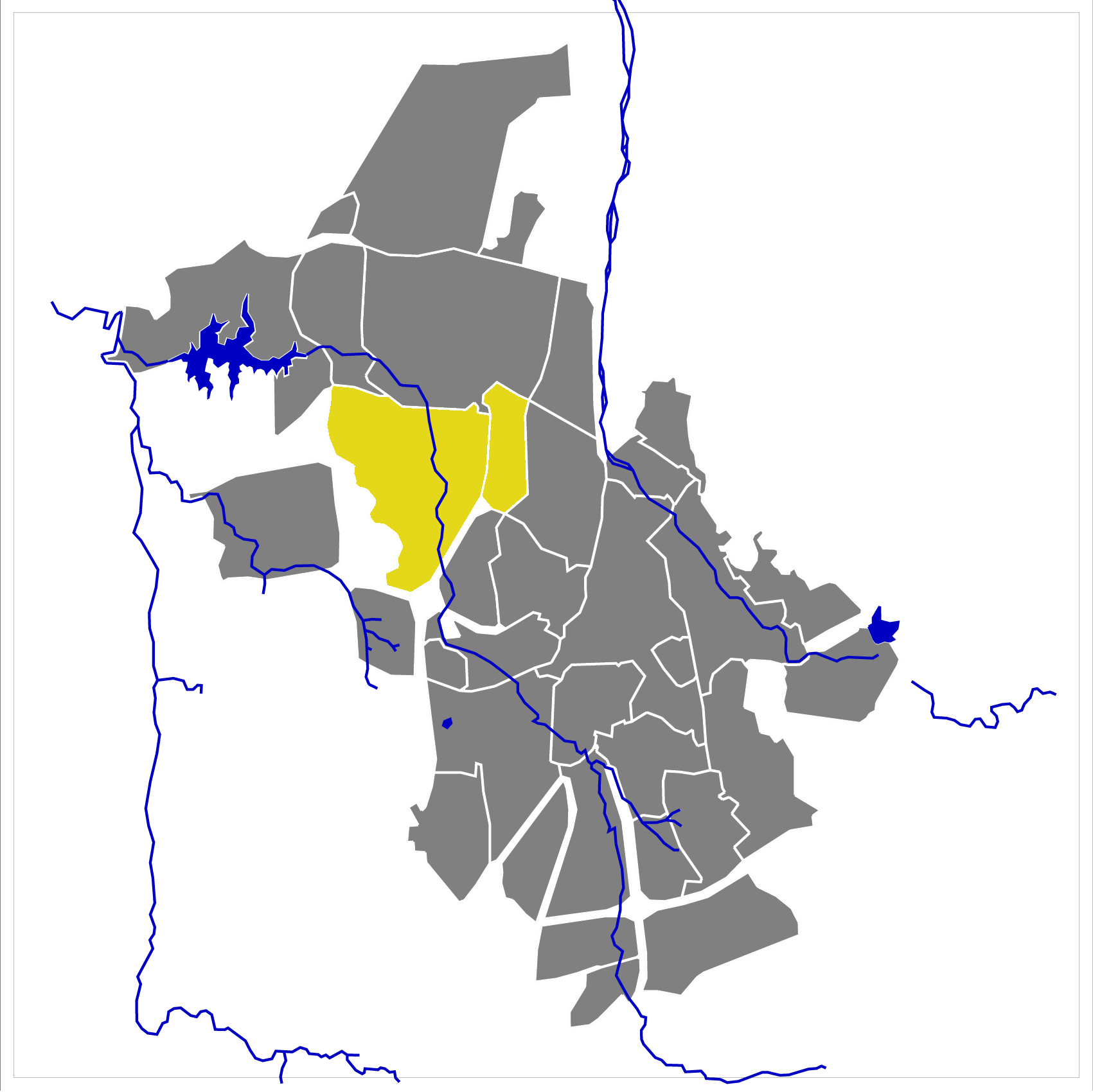

Khomasdal is a suburb of Namibia's capital of Windhoek in the Khomas Region. Founded as Windhoek's residential area for Coloured people, Khomasdal still is primarily composed of Coloured people.

Khomasdal is located in Khomasdal Constituency and part of it in Windhoek-west Constituency. The suburb consists of some 15 residential neighborhoods each with their distinct character, history and offers. The neighhoods are Betlehem (Skuldbult), Donkerhoek, Eldorado, Francoistown, Funky Town, Grysblok, Kloppersdal, Laeveld, Rykmansheuwel, Spokiesdorp, Die Ses, Die Star, Vaalhoek, Vergenoeg, and the Extentions. Khomasdal is affectionately known as "Die Dal" which is short for Khomasdal, and teasingly as "Kom-ons-dwaal" and "Kom-ons-dalla" referring to the party and funky character of the suburb.

In October 2006, the City of Windhoek announced the construction of an informal market in Khomasdal. The market will give the Khomasdal community the opportunity to generate their own income and even create more jobs in the process. Since then the Market has been finished and is situated on the corner of Mahatma Gandhi and Hans-Dietrich Genscher streets in Khomasdal. A similar SME Market can also be found in Katutura.

Khomasdal is also home to the Windhoek College of Education, one of four national colleges of education.

== Notable people from Khomasdal ==
- Zenobia Kloppers (born 1973), actress
- Ricardo Mannetti (born 1975), head coach of the Brave Warriors
- Robbie Savage (1967–2017), official mascot of the Brave Warriors
