= Andreas Shipanga =

Namibian politician (1931–2012)

President of SWAPO Democrats
- In office 1978–1991
- Preceded by: position established
- Succeeded by: position abolished

Chairman of the Transitional Government of National Unity
- In office 1987–1988
- Preceded by: Dirk Mudge
- Succeeded by: Andrew Matjila

Minister of Nature Conservation, Mining, Commerce and Tourism
- In office 1 February 1987 – December 1988

SWAPO Secretary for Information and Publicity
- In office 1970–1976
- President: Sam Nujoma

Personal details
- Born: 26 October 1931 Ondangwa, Ovamboland Southwest Africa
- Died: 10 May 2012 (aged 80)
- Party: SWAPO (1957-1976); SWAPO Democrats (1976-1991)
- Spouse: Esme (Married 1965)

Andreas Zack Shipanga (26 October 1931 – 10 May 2012) was a Namibian politician known for the "Shipanga Affair", a movement within SWAPO that sought to elect a new leadership and whose followers were in response detained without trial. Imprisoned for two years following this fall-out, Shipanga was arrested and held in detention in Zambia then Tanzania until 1978.

After his release from prison he founded the opposing SWAPO Democrats and served as minister in different portfolios in the Transitional Government of National Unity, the interim government of South-West Africa directly before Namibian independence.

== Early life and travels ==
Shipanga was born on 26 October 1931 in Ondangwa, Ovamboland. He obtained a Teacher's Training Certificate at Ongwediva in 1952. Soon after graduation he travelled abroad in search of further education which was not possible for Blacks after 1948. The National Party had won the 1948 election in South Africa, subsequently apartheid legislation was introduced. He first stayed in Angola, then moved on to South Africa, and from there to South Rhodesia.

== Career with SWAPO ==
Having read about Andimba Toivo ya Toivo and Fillemon Mifima preparing the foundation of a political party in support of Namibian independence, Shipanga traveled to Cape Town to join the group in 1957. He co-founded the Ovamboland People's Congress, the predecessor of OPO and SWAPO.

Shipanga returned to South-West Africa in 1960 and went into exile in 1963 where he helped established several SWAPO offices and military training camps. He was SWAPO's representative in Kinshasa, Zaire and then Cairo, Egypt from 1964-69. While in Egypt, he married his wife Esmé. Following his stint as diplomat, he became the SWAPO Secretary for Information and Publicity from 1970 until 1976.

== SWAPO D ==
In the 1970s Shipanga complained about corruption within SWAPO and misuse of donor funds. He suggested to elect new leaders and for this to be able to happen he pushed forward the organisation of a party congress. These actions were later called the "Shipanga Rebellion". He and members of his group were arrested in Zambia in 1976. Shipanga was jailed for two years at different facilities, but never charged or tried.

Upon his release in 1978 he applied for asylum in the United Kingdom where his wife was a citizen. However, he travelled on to Sweden and returned to Namibia the same year and formed SWAPO Democrats, better known as SWAPO D. SWAPO Democrats participated in South African-sponsored "internal settlements", including the Transitional Government of National Unity, a pseudo-government installed by South Africa. He served as Minister of Mines and Energy, of Nature Conservation and Tourism, and of Commerce and Industry. Shipanga later related the poor performance of SWAPO D in the first democratic elections of Namibia to his involvement in this controversial body.

Shipanga was the chairman of the Transitional Government of National Unity in 1987 and 1988. When SWAPO D failed to get a single seat in the 1989 parliamentary elections, the first democratic elections in Namibia, Shipanga retired from politics. His party disbanded in 1991.

Shipanga died from a heart attack on 10 May 2012 at Uuhehe settlement in the Oshikoto Region of northern Namibia.

== See also ==
- List of kidnappings (1960–1969)

Preceded by Ebenezer van Zijl	Chairman of the Transitional Government of National Unity of Namibia; February–April 1987	Succeeded by Dawid Bezuidenhout
Preceded by Dirk Mudge	Chairman of the Transitional Government of National Unity of Namibia; October–December 1988	Succeeded by Andrew Matjila
