= South West African Labour Party =

Former political party in Namibia

The South West African Labour Party, initially known as the Federal Coloured People's Party, was a political party in Namibia. It was formed in 1973, and led by Andrew Kloppers. In October 1974, it won the elections to the South West Africa Coloured Council. It participated in the Turnhalle Constitutional Conference and subsequently joined the Democratic Turnhalle Alliance.
