= Namibia National Front =

Political party

The Namibia National Front (NNF) was an alliance of moderate nationalist parties in Namibia. It was formed in 1977 as a merger of the Namibia National Convention (which had been marginalized after SWAPO's departure from it) and the Namibia National Council.

At the time of its formation, the NNF consisted of the following groups:

- Damara Council
- Damara Executive Committee
- Federal Party
- South West African National Union
- Mbanderu Council
- Namibia Progressive Party
- Namibia Independence Party
- Voice of the People Party

In 1978, some groups left NNF to form Namibia People's Liberation Front.

The NNF contested the elections for the Constituent Assembly of Namibia in 1989 and won one seat which was taken by Vekuii Rukoro.
