= List of members of the 4th National Assembly of Namibia =

4th National Assembly of Namibia

Type
- Type: Bicameral

History
- Founded: 2005

Structure
- Seats: 78
- Political groups: SWAPO (55) CoD (5) DTA (4) Others (8) Appointed (6)

Below is a list of members of the 4th National Assembly of Namibia. They were selected by their parties based on the results of the 2004 parliamentary election. The members were in the National Assembly from 21 March 2005 until 21 March 2010. Members were chosen by their parties. Parties were voted in via proportional representation.

The 4th National Assembly consisted of 78 members: 72 elected from the party lists, and 6 without voting rights, appointed by the president. This National Assembly, like each of the previous National Assemblies, was led by the South West Africa People's Organization. The seat distribution for the voting members was as follows:

- South West Africa People's Organization (SWAPO): 55
- Congress of Democrats (CoD): 5
- Democratic Turnhalle Alliance (DTA): 4
- National Unity Democratic Organisation (NUDO): 3
- United Democratic Front (UDF): 3
- Republican Party (RP): 1
- Monitor Action Group (MAG): 1

== Members ==
The following people were members of the 4th National Assembly:

=== South West Africa People's Organization ===
- Theo-Ben Gurirab Speaker of the National Assembly
- Doreen Sioka Deputy Speaker of the National Assembly
- Nahas Angula Prime Minister
- Ngarikutuke Tjiriange
- John Pandeni
- Jerry Ekandjo
- Richard Kamwi
- Saara Kuugongelwa-Amadhila
- Joel Kaapanda
- Marco Hausiku
- Albert Kawana
- Utoni Nujoma
- Loide Kasingo
- Immanuel Ngatjizeko
- Pendukeni Iivula-Ithana
- Petrus Iilonga
- Teopolina Mushelenga
- Alpheus ǃNaruseb
- Nangolo Mbumba
- Libertina Amathila
- Erkki Nghimtina
- Bernhardt Esau
- Lempy Lucas
- Victor Simunja
- Hansina Christiaan
- Pohamba Shifeta
- Angelika Muharukwa
- John Mutorwa
- Petrina Haingura
- Paulus Kapia
- Willem Konjore
- Lucia Basson
- Abraham Iyambo
- Ben Amathila
- Isak Katali
- Peya Mushelenga
- Leon Jooste
- Gabriel Shihepo
  - Nicky Nashandi (replaced Shihepo in September 2008)
- Tjekero Tweya
- Hage Geingob
- Moses Amweelo
- Marlene Mungunda
- Royal ǀUiǀoǀoo
- Peter Tsheehama
- Kazenambo Kazenambo
- Hans Booys
- Raphael Dinyando
- Rosalia Nghidinwa
- Evelyn ǃNawases
- Tommy Nambahu
- Nickey Iyambo
- Philemon Malima
- Netumbo Nandi-Ndaitwah
- Samuel Ankama
- Elia Kaiyamo
- Jeremia Nambinga ()
- Charles Namoloh (appointed by the president)
- Rebecca Ndjoze-Ojo (appointed by the president)
- Paul Smit (appointed by the president)
- Ida Hoffmann (appointed by the president)
- Alexia Manombe-Ncube (appointed by the president)
- Reggie Diergaardt (appointed by the president)

=== Congress of Democrats ===
- Ben Ulenga
- Nora Schimming-Chase
- Tsudao Gurirab
- Elma Dienda
- Kalla Gertze

=== Democratic Turnhalle Alliance ===
- Katuutire Kaura
- Phillemon Moongo
- Johan De Waal
- McHenry Venaani

=== United Democratic Front ===
- Justus ǁGaroëb
- Gustaphine Tjombe
- Michael Goreseb

=== National Unity Democratic Organisation ===
- Kuaima Riruako
- Arnold Tjihuiko
- Mburumba Kerina (expelled from NUDO in 2005)
  - Asser Mbai (from 2005)

=== Monitor Action Group ===
- Jurie Viljoen

=== Republic Party ===
- Henk Mudge

National Assembly of Namibia
Preceded by 3rd National Assembly	4th National Assembly; 21 March 2005 – 21 March 2010	Succeeded by 5th National Assembly
