= Nangolo Mbumba =

President of Namibia from 2024 to 2025

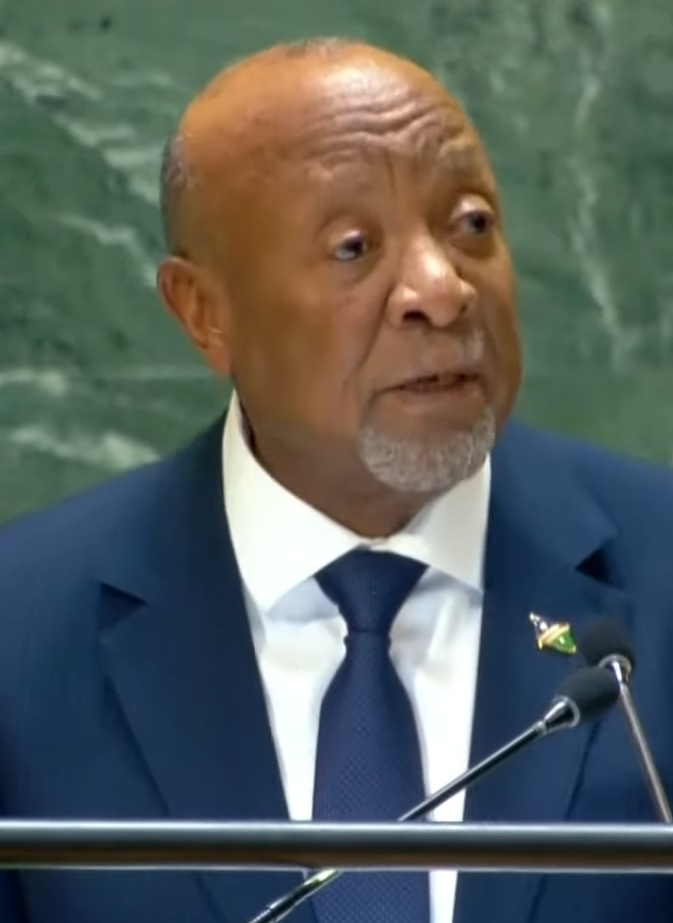
- Mbumba in 2024

4th President of Namibia
- In office 4 February 2024 – 21 March 2025
- Prime Minister: Saara Kuugongelwa
- Vice President: Netumbo Nandi-Ndaitwah
- Preceded by: Hage Geingob
- Succeeded by: Netumbo Nandi-Ndaitwah

2nd Vice President of Namibia
- In office 13 February 2018 – 4 February 2024
- President: Hage Geingob
- Preceded by: Nickey Iyambo
- Succeeded by: Netumbo Nandi-Ndaitwah

Chancellor of the University of Namibia
- Incumbent
- Assumed office 28 February 2018
- President: Hage Geingob
- Preceded by: Hifikepunye Pohamba

Secretary-General of SWAPO
- In office December 2012 – November 2017
- President: Hifikepunye Pohamba; Hage Geingob
- Preceded by: Pendukeni Iivula-Ithana
- Succeeded by: Sophia Shaningwa

Minister of Safety and Security
- In office 2010 – 4 December 2012
- President: Hifikepunye Pohamba
- Preceded by: Nickey Iyambo
- Succeeded by: Immanuel Ngatjizeko

Minister of Education
- In office 2005–2010
- President: Hifikepunye Pohamba
- Preceded by: Nahas Angula
- Succeeded by: Abraham Iyambo

Minister of Information and Broadcasting
- In office 2003–2005
- President: Sam Nujoma
- Preceded by: Theo-Ben Gurirab
- Succeeded by: Netumbo Nandi-Ndaitwah

Minister of Finance
- In office 1996–2003
- President: Sam Nujoma
- Preceded by: Helmut Angula
- Succeeded by: Saara Kuugongelwa-Amadhila

Minister of Agriculture, Water and Rural Development
- In office 1993–1996
- President: Sam Nujoma
- Preceded by: Anton von Wietersheim
- Succeeded by: Helmut Angula

Personal details
- Born: 15 August 1941 (age 85) Olukonda, South West Africa (now Namibia)
- Party: SWAPO
- Spouse: Sustjie Mbumba
- Education: Southern Connecticut State University (BS); University of Connecticut (MS)
- Occupation: Politician; educator

Nangolo Mbumba (born 15 August 1941) is a Namibian politician who was the fourth president of Namibia from 2024 to 2025. He became president after the death of Hage Geingob, under whom he had served as the second vice president from 2018 until his accession to the presidency 2024.

A member of the South West Africa People's Organization (SWAPO), Mbumba has headed several Namibian Government ministries: Agriculture, Water and Rural Development (1993–1996), Finance (1996–2003), Information and Broadcasting (2003–2005), Education (2005–2010) and Safety and Security (2010–2012). From 2012 to 2017, he was the secretary-general of SWAPO.

Mbumba was appointed as a vice president in 2018 to replace Nickey Iyambo, who departed because of ill health. He succeeded to the presidency upon the death of Hage Geingob in February 2024 and announced that he had no intention of running for election for a full term later in the year.

== Education and early career ==
Born on 15 August 1941 in Olukonda, Oshikoto Region, South West Africa (now Namibia), Mbumba graduated from Southern Connecticut State University in the United States with a BSc in 1971. In 1973, he graduated from the University of Connecticut (UConn) with an MSc in biology.

After graduating from UConn, Mbumba began teaching at Harlem Preparatory School in New York City. Returning to Africa in 1978, he became the head of the Science Department at the Namibia Education Centre in Cuanza Sul, Angola. In 1980, he was promoted to Principal of the Centre. He held that post until 1985.

== Politics ==
Mbumba officially took a position with SWAPO in 1985 as Deputy Secretary for Education and Culture. Leaving that position in 1987, he became Personal Secretary to SWAPO President Sam Nujoma. He was the joint administrator of Walvis Bay during its handover to Namibia in 1994.

Beginning in 1993, Mbumba served in the National Assembly of Namibia and government ministries including Agriculture, Water and Rural Development (1993–1996), Finance (1996–2003), Information and Broadcasting (2003–2005), Education (2005–2010), and Safety and Security (2010–2012).

Mbumba was elected SWAPO Secretary-General at its 2012 congress, a position considered #3 in the party's structure. He won with 352 votes against Utoni Nujoma's 244 and pledged before the election that he would resign from his ministerial position if successful. On 4 December 2012, Immanuel Ngatjizeko was appointed to replace him as Minister of Safety and Security in the Cabinet reshuffle that followed the congress.

When Nickey Iyambo, Namibia's first vice president, was removed from the position in 2018 due to poor health, President Hage Geingob appointed Mbumba as his successor.

== President of Namibia (2024–2025) ==
Nangolo Mbumba became acting president of Namibia when President Hage Geingob traveled to the United States for cancer treatment on 24 January 2024. Mbumba announced the passing of Dr. Geingob in the early hours of 4 February. He was sworn in about 15 hours after Geingob's death on 4 February 2024 by Chief Justice Peter Shivute at the State House in Windhoek and appointed Deputy Prime Minister Netumbo Nandi-Ndaitwah to be his successor as Vice President. She was fielded by Geingob as the SWAPO presidential candidate for the 2024 Namibian general election, as his successor. Mbumba pledged to finish Geingob's term, which would expire on 21 March 2025, adding: "I am not going to be around for the elections. So don't panic." Mbumba was the Chief Mourner during the passing of Dr Hage Geingob and served that title once again when the Father of the Namibian Nation, Dr Sam Nujoma died on 9 February 2025.

== Honours ==
- Cuba:
  - Order of José Martí (17 December 2024)
- Namibia
  - Order of the Welwitschia (2024)

Conferred by H.E Dr Hifikepunye Pohamba, Former President of Namibia, 2005-2015.

Political offices
Preceded by Nickey Iyambo	Vice-President of Namibia; 2018–2024	Succeeded by Netumbo Nandi-Ndaitwah
Preceded by Hage Geingob	President of Namibia; 2024–2025	Succeeded by Netumbo Nandi-Ndaitwah
Party political offices
Preceded by Pendukeni Iivula-Ithana	Secretary-General of SWAPO; 2013–2017	Succeeded by Sophia Shaningwa
