= Gabes Shihepo =

Namibian politician

Gabriel "Gabes" Shihepo (March 26, 1945 – July 14, 2008) was a Namibian politician. From 1999 to 2008, he was a Member of Parliament for SWAPO and served as a deputy minister in the Cabinet.

Shihepo was born in Etale, in Ohangwena Region. He worked as a teacher and school principal. From 1992 to 1995, he was Chairperson of the Omahangu Farmers' Association; he was also Chairperson of the Mangetti Farmers' Union from 1992 to 1999. He became President of the Namibian National Farmers' Union (NNFU) in 1995, serving in that post until 1999.

Shihepo was elected to the National Assembly of Namibia in 1999. He joined Cabinet as deputy Minister of Information and Broadcasting in October 1999, and served as deputy Minister of Foreign Affairs, Information and Broadcasting on March 21, 2000. Shihepo was later moved to the post of deputy Minister of Safety and Security, in which position he remained at the time of his death.

While visiting northern Namibia, he died at the Ongwediva Medi-Park private hospital on July 14, 2008. Pendukeni Iivula-Ithana, the Secretary-General of SWAPO, praised Shihepo as "a freedom fighter who did not waver", while opposition leaders Katuutire Kaura, Ben Ulenga, and Ignatius Shixwameni also gave positive personal assessments of Shihepo, saying that he was friendly and cooperative.
