= Martin Luther High School, Okombahe =

Information
- Established: 1968; 57 years ago
- Teaching staff: 12
- Grades: 8-12
- Enrollment: c.250

Martin Luther High School (MLH) is a boarding school in the village of Okombahe in the Erongo Region of central Namibia, named after German church reformer Martin Luther. The school has about 250 pupils in grades 8 to 12, and twelve teachers.

There are different accounts on when and where the school was established. According to Klaus Dierks, Martin Luther High was opened in 1968 at the initiative of the Evangelical Lutheran Church of South West Africa. Originally planned for the nearby town of Karibib, the South African administration did not approve the establishment of a school for black children in the white-only town. Instead, a place had to be found where white teachers and black pupils could live segregated, and the school was opened in Okombahe at the edge of the Damaraland bantustan. According to the national newspaper The Namibian, the school was established in 1962 in Karibib and moved to Okombahe in 1970, again for the reason that the school admitted black learners, and Karibib was a white-only town. The school's medium of instruction during the years of South African occupation was English, while other government schools taught in Afrikaans.

The school has fallen into disrepair and launched a campaign in 2014 to have its basic amenities repaired. In 2015 the school had sufficient money collected to start its first renovation since 1970.

== Notable teachers and alumni ==
- Tangeni Amupadhi, editor of The Namibian
- Albertus Aochamub, press secretary in the Office of the President
- Axali Doëseb, composer of Namibia's National Anthem
- Max Hamata, editor of The Confidente
- Joshua ǁHoebeb, one of the first teachers at the school, today Governor of Kunene Region
- Alpheus ǃNaruseb, Minister of Lands and Resettlement
- Hilma Nicanor, Deputy Minister for Veteran Affairs, graduated 1974

== See also ==
- Education in Namibia
- List of schools in Namibia
