= Ministry of Veteran Affairs (Namibia) =

Government ministry of Namibia

The Ministry of Veteran Affairs was a department of the Namibian government, responsible for the social and economic support of veterans of the Namibian war of independence, and for the custody of Namibian independence war history. It was established in 2006. The first veteran affairs minister was Ngarikutuke Tjiriange, until then minister without portfolio.

The ministry was disbanded in 2015. The portfolio of veteran affairs fell to the office of the vice-president. In 2020 veteran affairs were added to the Ministry of Defence which was renamed Ministry of Defence and Veteran Affairs (MODVA). The current defence and veteran affairs minister is Frans Kapofi.

== Ministers ==
All veteran affairs ministers in chronological order are:

#	Picture	Name	(Birth–Death)	Party	Term start	Term end
Minister of Veteran Affairs
1		Ngarikutuke Tjiriange	1943–2021	SWAPO	2006	2010
2		Nickey Iyambo	1936–2019	SWAPO	2010	2015
Minister of Defence and Veteran Affairs
3		Peter Vilho	1962–	SWAPO	2020	2021
4		Frans Kapofi	1953–	SWAPO	2021	

== See also ==
- History of Namibia
