= Ministry of Land Reform (Namibia) =

Government ministry of Namibia

The Ministry of Land Reform was a government ministry of Namibia, with headquarters in Windhoek. It was created at Namibian independence in 1990 as Ministry of Lands, Resettlement and Rehabilitation, renamed Ministry of Lands and Resettlement in 2005, and got its last name change in 2015. In 2020 the ministry was disestablished, and the portfolio of land reform was given to the agriculture ministry.

The first Namibian land reform minister was Marco Hausiku. The current minister of Agriculture, Water and Land Reform is Calle Schlettwein.

== Ministers ==
All land reform ministers in chronological order are:

#	Picture	Name	(Birth–Death)	Party	Term start	Term end
Minister of Lands, Resettlement and Rehabilitation
1		Marco Hausiku	1953–2021	SWAPO	1990	1992
2		Richard Kapelwa Kabajani	1943–2007	SWAPO	1992	1996
3		Pendukeni Iivula-Ithana	1952–	SWAPO	1996	2002
4		Hifikepunye Pohamba	1935–	SWAPO	2002	2005
Minister of Lands and Resettlement
5		Jerry Ekandjo	1947–	SWAPO	2005	2008
6		Alpheus ǃNaruseb	1954–	SWAPO	2008	2015
Minister of Land Reform
7		Utoni Nujoma	1952–	SWAPO	2015	2020
Minister of Agriculture, Water and Land Reform
8		Calle Schlettwein	1954–	SWAPO	2020	

== See also ==
- Land reform in Namibia
