= Frans Kapofi =

Namibian politician (born 1953)

The Honourable Frans Kapofi MP
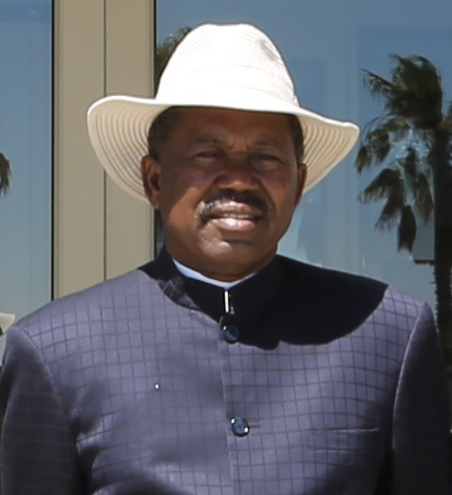
- Kapofi in 2016

Minister of Defence and Veterans Affairs
- Incumbent
- Assumed office 22 April 2021
- President: Hage Geingob
- Preceded by: Peter Vilho

Minister of Home Affairs
- In office 8 February 2018 – 22 April 2021
- President: Hage Geingob
- Preceded by: Pendukeni Iivula-Ithana
- Succeeded by: Albert Kawana

Minister Of Presidential Affairs
- In office 21 March 2015 – 8 February 2018
- President: Hage Geingob
- Preceded by: Albert Kawana
- Succeeded by: Immanuel Ngatjizeko

Secretary to cabinet
- In office 1999–2015
- President: Hifikepunye Pohamba; Hage Geingob

Personal details
- Born: 25 January 1953 (age 73) Onaame, Ohangwena Region
- Party: SWAPO
- Education: Eastern and Southern African Management Institute, Naval Postgraduate School

Frans Kapofi (born 25 January 1953 at Onaame, Ohangwena region) is a Namibian politician who since 1999 has served in various positions in cabinet.

== Education ==
Kapofi obtained a Master’s in Business Administration from the Eastern and Southern Institute for Management, ESAMI, Tanzania in 2006. He also attended a Senior International Defence Management Course at Naval Postgraduate School, Monterey, California, USA in 1996.

Kapofi also possesses a Diploma in Modern Management Administration from the Cambridge Tutorial College, Jersey, Britain, which he obtained in 1993. Furthermore, Kapofi has a Diploma: Social Science, Leninist Institute of High Learning, Moscow, USSR which he obtained in 1994.

== Career ==
Kapofi held various offices during the liberation struggle of Namibia, including Chief Political Commissar of PLAN, SWAPO Defence Headquarters, Lubango (1987-1989); and Deputy Chief Political Commissar of PLAN, SWAPO Defence Headquarters, Lubango (1986-1987), and other various offices in SWAPO.

A member of SWAPO, he is a military officer by training. Kapofi has been a permanent secretary for various ministries of government since 1990. Thereafter he was appointed cabinet secretary from 1999 to 2015. From 2015 to 2018 he served as Minister of Presidential Affairs. He was appointed Minister of Home Affairs in a cabinet reshuffle on 8 February 2018. Kapofi retained his portfolio after the 2019 Namibian general election; The ministry gained additionally the portfolio of safety and security in 2020. In a cabinet reshuffle in April 2021, he was moved to the Ministry of Defence and Veterans Affairs. He has closely worked with all three of Namibia’s heads of state.

Kapofi retained his position as minister when Netumbo Nandi-Ndaitwah became president in March 2025. On 28 October 2025 he was additionally appointed interim Minister of Industries, Mines and Energy.
