= Marlene Mungunda =

Namibian politician

The Honourable Marlene Mungunda

Minister of Gender Equality and Child Welfare
- In office 2005–2010
- President: Hifikepunye Pohamba
- Prime Minister: Nahas Angula
- Preceded by: Netumbo Nandi-Ndaitwah
- Succeeded by: Doreen Sioka

Minister of Labour and Social Welfare
- In office 2004–2005
- President: Sam Nujoma
- Prime Minister: Theo-Ben Gurirab
- Preceded by: Marco Hausiku
- Succeeded by: Alpheus ǃNaruseb

Deputy minister of Minister of Gender Equality and Child Welfare
- In office 2000–2004
- President: Sam Nujoma
- Prime Minister: Hage Geingob; Theo-Ben Gurirab

Personal details
- Born: September 11, 1954 (age 71) Mariental, Hardap Region
- Occupation: Politician

Maria Marlene Mungunda (born 11 September 1954 in Mariental, Hardap Region) is a Namibian politician who served in several portfolios as minister. She is a teacher by profession and worked as teacher from 1975 to 1996.

== Career ==
A member of the SWAPO, Mungunda worked in the lower party structures for her home town Mariental and for the Southern region. In 1996 she entered parliament. She was appointed deputy minister of Minister of Gender Equality and Child Welfare in 2000. In 2004 she was promoted to Minister of Labour and Social Welfare, and in 2005 she returned to the gender equality ministry, this time as minister.
