= Doreen Sioka =

Namibian politician

The Honourable Doreen Sioka MP

Minister of Gender Equality, Poverty Eradication and Social Welfare
- In office 18 March 2015 – 21 March 2025
- President: Hage Geingob
- Preceded by: Rosalia Nghidinwa
- In office 21 March 2005 – 4 December 2012
- President: Hifikepunye Pohamba
- Preceded by: Marlene Mungunda
- Succeeded by: Rosalia Nghidinwa

Minister of Labour and Social Welfare
- In office 4 December 2012 – 17 March 2015
- President: Hifikepunye Pohamba
- Preceded by: Immanuel Ngatjizeko
- Succeeded by: Erkki Nghimtina

Deputy Speaker of the National Assembly
- In office 21 March 2005 – 21 March 2010
- President: Hifikepunye Pohamba
- Preceded by: Willem Konjore
- Succeeded by: Loide Kasingo

Personal details
- Born: 18 September 1960 (age 66) Kasheshe, Zambezi Region
- Party: SWAPO
- Spouse: Victor Sioka
- Children: 3
- Education: Management College of Southern Africa
- Occupation: Politician
- Profession: Teacher

Doreen Nampiye Sioka (born 1960) is a Namibian politician. She was member of the National Assembly of Namibia from 1994 to 21 March 2025 for the South West Africa People's Organization (SWAPO), and a member of the cabinet from 2005 to 21 March 2025, served as Minister of Gender Equality, Poverty Eradication and Social Welfare.

== Early life and exile ==
Sioka was born on 18 September 1960 in Kasheshe village in the Zambezi Region and attended primary school in her home village. At age 15, she went into exile in Zambia, due to the ongoing conflict in South West Africa between the apartheid led military and the Namibian freedom fighters.

When she was injured in a South African Defence Force raid on Oshatotwa in 1976 she decided to join the People's Liberation Army of Namibia, during which she participated in the attacks on Katima Mulilo in 1977 and 1978 as one of only three female insurgents.

After the 1978 attack she worked for Voice of Namibia, SWAPO's exile radio station, and furthered her education. She received a certificate in journalism and library information in Ndola and completed secondary school at Roosevelt Secondary School for Girls in Freetown, Sierra Leone. Sioka then worked as teacher at Namibia Health and Education Centre in Kwanza-Sul, Angola, until shortly before Namibian independence.

== Political career ==
After independence of Namibia in 1989 Sioka held several political roles in SWAPO's Women's Council. She was elected to Parliament in 1994, and to SWAPO Central Committee in 1997. In 2005, Sioka was elected deputy speaker of the 4th National Assembly.

After the 2009 general election Sioka was appointed Minister of Gender Equality and Child Welfare, and in a cabinet reshuffle in December 2012, following the fifth SWAPO congress, her portfolio as minister was changed to that of Minister of Labour and Social Welfare, replacing Immanuel Ngatjizeko.

When Hage Geingob became president in 2015, Sioka was returned to the position of Minister of Gender Equality and Child Welfare. She retained the position after Geingob appointed his cabinet during a second term. In 2020, ShutItAllDown protesters demanded for her resignation after they claimed she could not resolve the issue of gender based violence in Namibia.

== Private life ==
Doreen Sioka is married with three children. Besides her degrees earned during her time of exile she also completed two correspondence courses, and earned a high diploma and certificate in defence and security from Cambridge Tutorial College and a diploma in business administration from Management College of Southern Africa (MANCOSA).
