= Ministry of Home Affairs (Namibia) =

Government ministry of Namibia

The Namibian Ministry of Home Affairs (MHA) is a department of the Namibian government. It was established at Namibian independence in 1990, the first Minister was Hifikepunye Pohamba who later became Namibia's second president. In 2020, Home Affairs was merged with the Ministry of Safety and Security and renamed Ministry of Home Affairs, Immigration, Safety and Security (MHAISS). Beside its functions as interior ministry, MHAISS also oversees the Namibian police and the prisons. The current minister is Lucia Iipumbu, deputized by Edward Wambo who was appointed on 2 April 2026 by President Netumbo Nandi-Ndaitwah.

== Ministers ==
All home affairs ministers in chronological order are:

#	Picture	Name	(Birth–Death)	Party	Term start	Term end
Minister of Home Affairs
1		Hifikepunye Pohamba	1935–	SWAPO	1990	1995
2		Jerry Ekandjo	1947–	SWAPO	1995	2005
3		Rosalia Nghidinwa	1952–2018	SWAPO	2005	2012
4		Pendukeni Iivula-Ithana	1952–	SWAPO	2012	2018
5		Frans Kapofi	1953–	SWAPO	2018	2020
Minister of Home Affairs, Immigration, Safety and Security
		Frans Kapofi	1953–	SWAPO	2020	2021
6		Albert Kawana	1956–	SWAPO	2021	2025
7		Lucia Iipumbu	1975–	SWAPO	2025	
