= Erkki Nghimtina =

Namibian politician and military officer (1947–2026)

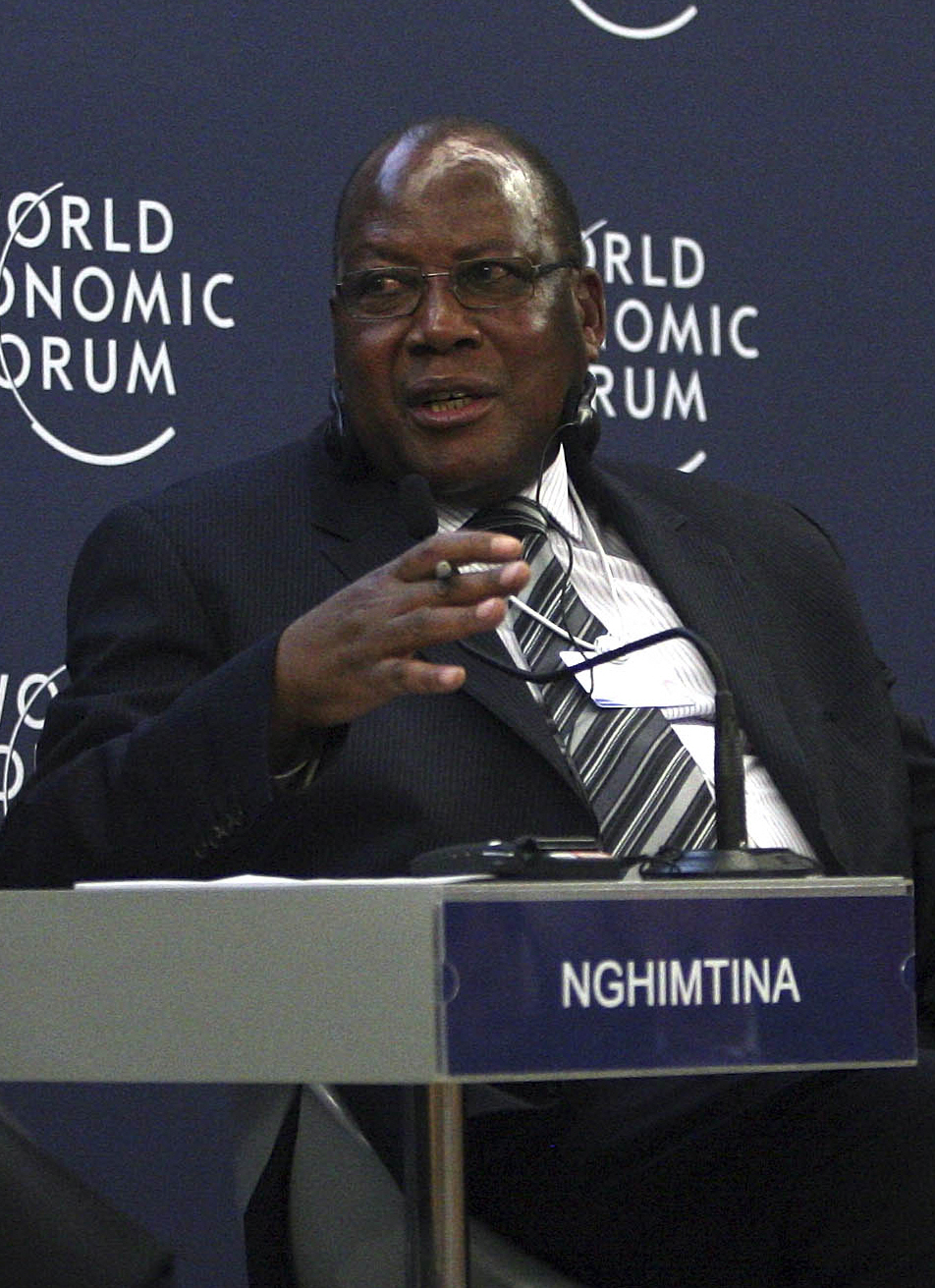
- Nghimtina at the World Economic Forum in 2012

Minister of Labour, Industrial Relations and Employment Creation
- In office 2015–2020
- President: Hage Geingob
- Preceded by: Doreen Sioka
- Succeeded by: Utoni Nujoma

Minister of Works and Transport
- In office 2010–2015
- President: Hifikepunye Pohamba
- Preceded by: Helmut Angula
- Succeeded by: Alpheus ǃNaruseb

Minister of Mines and Energy
- In office 2005–2010
- President: Hifikepunye Pohamba
- Preceded by: Nickey Iyambo
- Succeeded by: Isak Katali

Minister of Defence
- In office 1997–2005
- President: Sam Nujoma
- Preceded by: Philemon Malima
- Succeeded by: Charles Namoloh

Deputy Minister of Defence
- In office 1995–1997
- President: Sam Nujoma

Personal details
- Born: 16 September 1947 Eembidi, Ohangwena, South West Africa
- Died: 8 February 2026 (aged 78) Edundja village, Ohangwena, Namibia
- Party: SWAPO
- Education: Rostock University
- Occupation: Politician

Erkki Nghimtina (16 September 1947 – 8 February 2026) was a Namibian politician and military officer in the Namibia Defence Force (NDF). A member of the South West Africa People's Organization (SWAPO), Nghimtina served as member of the National Assembly of Namibia from 1995 to 2020. He served in various cabinet roles from 2005 to 2020.

== Early life and exile ==
Erkki Nghimtina was born in Eembidi in Ovamboland (now Ohangwena Region) in September 1947 to Meriam Shopati and Johannes Nghimtina. He began working in 1970 as a clerk in Oshakati, and from 1972–1974 in the postal services of South West Africa.

He went into exile with SWAPO in 1974 to Oshatotwa, Zambia. From Zambia, he left to the Soviet Union, where he trained as a military radio specialist until 1976. Returning to Zambia, Nghimtina became instructor and later supervisor for the eastern front of the Namibian War of Independence until 1979. From 1979–1982, he was the director of communications at Shilumbaba in Zambia while earning a diploma from the University of Rostock in the German Democratic Republic. From 1983–1989, he was the director of communications for the People's Liberation Army of Namibia (PLAN) wing of SWAPO.

Nghimtina returned to Namibia for the first time in 15 years in 1989.

== Military career ==
Nghimtina entered the Namibia Defence Force (NDF) with the rank of colonel and was appointed assistant director of communications in the NDF and lasted in that post until retirement from active duty in 1995. While in the Namibian military, Nghimtina worked extensively with Southern African Development Community and African Union on regional and continental security measures.

On Heroes' Day 2014 he was conferred the Most Brilliant Order of the Sun, Second Class.

== Political career ==
Upon retirement from the military in 1995, Nghimtina entered politics. He was selected to the position of deputy Minister of Defence. In 1997, he was also selected to the SWAPO central committee. In 1997, Nghimtina was promoted to minister in the defence ministry, a position he held until 2005. During this time, he was involved in leading the Namibian response to the 1999 Caprivi Secession movement. In an Amnesty International report, Nghimtina is quoted as acknowledging that security forces had "made some mistakes regarding human rights abuses" in the handling of the situation.

From 2005, he was appointed the Minister of Mines and Energy in president Hifikepunye Pohamba's cabinet. In this position, Nghimtina led Namibia's diamond industry to be restructured, which resulted in Namibian diamonds being cut and polished locally; also a state company, Epangelo Mining, to be established. In 2010, he was appointed to lead the Ministry of Works and Transport. In 2015, Nghimtina was appointed Namibia's Minister of Labour, Industrial Relations and Employment Creation under president Hage Geingob. He served until 2020 when he was not reappointed to cabinet.

== Political stances ==
In 2001, while speaking in the Kavango Region as Minister of Defence, Nghimtina denounced and threatened Namibian collaborators with the Angolan rebel group UNITA while the Angolan Civil War was coming to a close. He said that the Military of Namibia would not allow people to die because collaborators were Namibians.

Nghimtina consistently opposed the Iraq War, slamming it both immediately prior to and a year into it as a move by powerful nations to impose their will on weaker ones.

== 2008 controversy ==
In September 2008, Nghimtina was accused of aiming a firearm at a young relative and firing a shot in his direction. He allegedly did this because the teenager had joined the opposition Rally for Democracy and Progress (RDP). At a press conference held by RDP following the events, Jesaya Nyamu, acting secretary of the party, called it an attempted murder.

Following a press conference, President Hifikepunye Pohamba called Nghimtina into the State House to discuss the matter, which led to Nghimtina's forced resignation from both the National Assembly of Namibia and his ministerial position. However, following a meeting of high-level government and party officials including SWAPO secretary Pendukeni Iivula-Ithana, the minister was recalled to the State House and reprimanded, allowing him to retain his office. Shortly thereafter, Nghimtina was interrogated by Namibian police concerning the shooting. Infuriated by the interrogation, he resigned again. On 2 September, Nghimtina told The Namibian newspaper that he had not resigned and other party officials called his resignation just speculation. President Pohamba left for Zambia for the state funeral of President Levy Mwanawasa and was unable to immediately clear up the confusion. The next day, it was reported that Nghimtina had withdrawn his letter of resignation and returned to his post after prominent SWAPO leadership other than president Pohamba overruled Pohamba's dismissal.

== Death ==
Nghimtina died in the village of Edundja on 8 February 2026, at the age of 78. He was conferred a military funeral by President Netumbo Nandi-Ndaitwah. Nghimtina was raid to rest on the 21 February 2026 at Eenhana Shrine.
