= Charles Namoloh =

Namibian diplomat, politician and military figure

The Honourable Charles Namoloh
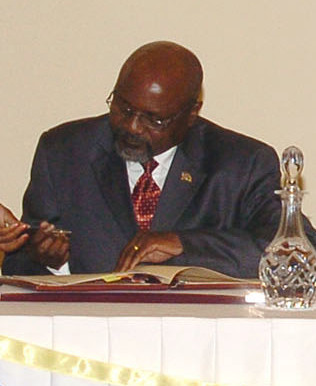

Minister of Safety and Security
- In office 21 March 2015 – 21 March 2020
- Preceded by: Immanuel Ngatjizeko
- Succeeded by: Frans Kapofi

Minister of Regional and Local Government, Housing and Rural Development
- In office 4 December 2012 – 21 March 2015
- Preceded by: Jerry Ekandjo
- Succeeded by: Sophia Shaningwa

Minister of Defence
- In office 21 March 2005 – 4 December 2012
- Preceded by: Erkki Nghimtina
- Succeeded by: Nahas Angula

Personal details
- Born: 28 February 1950 (age 76) Odibo, South-West Africa
- Party: SWAPO

Military service
- Allegiance: Namibia
- Branch/service: PLAN; Namibian Army
- Years of service: 1974-1995
- Rank: Major General
- Battles/wars: South African Border War; Second Congo War

Major General Charles Dickson Ndaxu Phillip Namoloh (born 28 February 1950) is a Namibian politician and former military officer who served in the cabinet of Namibia as Minister of Safety and Security from March 2015 to March 2020. Namoloh has been a member of the National Assembly of Namibia since 2005; having served as Minister of Defence from 2005 to 2012 and Minister of Regional and Local Government, Housing and Rural Development from 2012 to 2015.

== Personal ==
Namoloh was born on 28 February 1950, in Odibo, Ovamboland (now Ohangwena Region). He completed his primary and secondary education in Oshakati and Tsumeb between 1965 and 1970.

== Career ==
Namoloh entered politics as a union organizer for the South West Africa People's Organization (SWAPO) in 1971, in Walvis Bay during the Namibian War of Independence. Temporarily fleeing to southern Angola, Namoloh returned but was arrested in 1973 for pro-SWAPO activities. After spending time in prison, Namoloh was released to Kwanyama (Ovamboland) authorities to receive lashes for supporting SWAPO. Following the decolonization of Angola in 1974 and the Carnation Revolution in Portugal, Namoloh fled with other SWAPO Party Youth League members through Angola to SWAPO bases in Zambia. Rising quickly through the People's Liberation Army of Namibia (PLAN), Namoloh became the chief of staff to Dimo Hamaambo in 1979. He fought under the nom de guerre "Ho Chi Minh".

Following Namibia's independence in 1990, Namoloh helped establish the Namibian Defence Force and was given the rank of Major General and appointed NDF Chief of Staff in the office of the Chief of Defence between 1990 and 1995. In 1995, Namoloh was sent to Angola as Namibia's representative. In 2003, the former PLAN commander was sent to New Delhi, India as Namibia's top diplomat in that country.

Namoloh returned home in 2005 to be selected for the National Assembly and appointed Minister of Defence. Following the fifth SWAPO congress at the end of November 2012, a cabinet reshuffle occurred on 4 December 2012, in which Namoloh was deployed as Minister of Regional and Local Government, Housing and Rural Development, succeeding Jerry Ekandjo. Former prime minister Nahas Angula took over Namoloh's defence portfolio.

Under President Hage Geingob, Namoloh was moved to the post of Minister of Safety and Security in March 2015.

Military offices
Preceded by position established	NDF Chief of Staff; 1990 – 1995	Succeeded by Martin Shalli
