= Ministry of Labour (Namibia) =

Former government ministry of Namibia

The Namibian Ministry of Labour (MOL) was a department of the Namibian government. It was established at Namibian independence in 1990. The first Namibian Minister of Labour and Manpower Development was Hendrik Witbooi.

In 1995 the ministry was renamed Ministry of Labour and Human Resources, the first minister with this portfolio was Moses ǁGaroëb. In 1997 the ministry was again renamed, to Ministry of Labour and Social Welfare. In 2015 the name of the ministry changed to Ministry of Labour, Industrial Relations and Employment Creation. In 2025 the ministry was disestablished, and its portfolio was given to the justice ministry. The current Minister of Justice and Labour Relations is Fillemon Wise Immanuel.

== Ministers ==
All labour ministers in chronological order are:

#	Picture	Name	(Birth–Death)	Party	Term start	Term end
Minister of Labour and Manpower Development
1		Hendrik Witbooi	1934–2009	SWAPO	1990	1995
Minister of Labour and Human Resources
2		Moses ǁGaroëb	1942–1997	SWAPO	1995	1997
Minister of Labour and Social Welfare
		John Shaetonhodi (acting)	1949–	SWAPO	1997	1999
3		Andimba Toivo ya Toivo	1924–2017	SWAPO	1999	2002
4		Marco Hausiku	1953–2021	SWAPO	2002	2004
5		Marlene Mungunda	1954–	SWAPO	2004	2005
6		Alpheus ǃNaruseb	1970–	SWAPO	2005	2008
7		Immanuel Ngatjizeko	1952–2022	SWAPO	2008	2012
8		Doreen Sioka	1960–	SWAPO	2012	2015
Minister of Labour, Industrial Relations & Employment Creation
9		Erkki Nghimtina	1948–	SWAPO	2015	2020
10		Utoni Nujoma	1952–	SWAPO	2020	2025
Minister of Justice and Labour Relations
9		Fillemon Wise Immanuel		SWAPO	2025	

== See also ==
- Economy of Namibia
