= Fillemon Wise Immanuel =

Namibian politician

The Honourable Fillemon Wise Immanuel MP

Minister of Justice and Labour Relations
- Incumbent
- Assumed office 22 March 2025
- President: Netumbo Nandi-Ndaitwah
- Preceded by: Yvonne Dausab Utoni Nujoma

Personal details
- Born: Onaluhaka, Oshikoto Region
- Party: SWAPO

Fillemon Wise Immanuel is a Namibian politician born at Onaluhaka in the Onihandhila District of Omuntele Constituency, in the Oshikoto region. He is currently serving as the Minister of Justice and Labour Relations and a member of the National Assembly of Namibia without voting power as appointed on the 22 March 2025 by President Netumbo Nandi Ndaitwah for the term 2025–2030.

== Early life and education ==
Immanuel grew up in the Onaluhaka village in the Onihandhila District in Oshikoto Region. He attended his early education at International Primary School and later proceeded to Mweshipandeka Secondary School. He studied for serveral university degrees including law, economics, business administration and management strategy

== Career ==
Immanuel started his leadership journey at a young age from being a headboy, SRC member responsible for academic affairs and eventually SRC president for Unam. He also served in leadership roles in the SWAPO Youth League.
