= Nickey Iyambo =

Namibian politician (1936–2019)

His Excellency Nickey Iyambo

1st Vice-President of Namibia
- In office 21 March 2015 – 8 February 2018
- President: Hage Geingob
- Preceded by: Position established
- Succeeded by: Nangolo Mbumba

Minister of Veteran Affairs
- In office March 2010 – March 2015
- President: Hifikepunye Pohamba
- Preceded by: Ngarikutuke Tjiriange
- Succeeded by: position abolished

Minister of Safety and Security
- In office 8 April 2008 – March 2010
- President: Hifikepunye Pohamba
- Preceded by: Peter Tsheehama
- Succeeded by: Nangolo Mbumba

Minister of Agriculture, Water and Forestry
- In office 30 March 2005 – 8 April 2008
- President: Hifikepunye Pohamba
- Preceded by: Helmut Angula
- Succeeded by: John Mutorwa

Minister of Mines and Energy
- In office 31 August 2002 – 30 March 2005
- President: Sam Nujoma
- Preceded by: Jesaya Nyamu
- Succeeded by: Erkki Nghimtina

Minister of Regional and Local Government and Housing
- In office August 1996 – 31 August 2002
- President: Sam Nujoma
- Preceded by: Libertina Amathila
- Succeeded by: Joel Kaapanda

Minister of Health and Social Services
- In office 21 March 1990 – August 1996
- President: Sam Nujoma
- Preceded by: position established
- Succeeded by: Libertina Amathila

Personal details
- Born: 20 May 1936 Onayena, Ovamboland, South West Africa (Now in Namibia)
- Died: 19 May 2019 (aged 82) Windhoek, Namibia
- Party: SWAPO
- Children: 4
- Education: University of Helsinki
- Occupation: Politician
- Profession: Medical doctor

Nickey Iyambo (20 May 1936 – 19 May 2019) was a Namibian politician and physician who served as the first Vice President of Namibia.

A member of SWAPO, Iyambo was a member of the Cabinet of Namibia since independence in March 1990. He was the Minister of Health and Social Services from 1990 to 1996, Minister of Regional and Local Government and Housing from 1996 to 2002, Minister of Mines and Energy from 2002 to 2005, Minister of Agriculture, Water and Forestry from 2005 to 2008, Minister of Safety and Security from 2008 to 2010, and Minister of Veteran Affairs since 2010. He assumed the newly created vice president position in 2015 and served until 2018, when he retired due to poor health. He continued to head the Ministry of Veterans' Affairs until his death.

== Early life and education ==
Iyambo was born in Onayena, Ovamboland, South West Africa, now in Oshikoto Region of northern Namibia. He went to a school that had been founded by Finnish missionaries near to his home, and having completed the school, we was given a job as Namibia's first Black postmaster from 1962 to 1963. However, having become a SWAPO member in 1960, he fled into exile with SWAPO in 1964, travelling on foot to Angola, continuing on to Zambia and Tanzania. He was amongst the earliest SWAPO members to go into exile and helped establish SWAPO's close relationship with Julius Nyerere's Tanzania.

At the time, Ylioppilaiden kansainvälinen apu (YKA, ‘Students’ International Relief’) was looking for projects it could fund, and its executive director Martti Ahtisaari was informed from Tanzania of Iyambo, and YKA offered a scholarship to him. In late 1965, Iyambo arrived in Finland, and he found living quarters at Domus Academica, the student housing unit of the Student Union of the University of Helsinki, where he shared a room with future politician and Governor of the Bank of Finland Erkki Liikanen. Iyambo began his studies with the Finnish language, and at the same time, he participated in the students’ social life, through which he became friends with many Finns and helped to raise their level of knowledge of African affairs, which was becoming increasingly interesting for Finns in the 1960s. On the other hand, Iyambo himself now became familiar with the Finnish welfare state and how politics worked in a democracy.

Iyambo first studied political science in Helsinki, attaining first the intermediary degree of bachelor of political science and then a master's degree in 1970, after which he studied medicine, attaining first the title of bachelor of medicine, and in 1980, the degree of licenciate of medicine, qualifying him to work as a medical doctor. During his time studying at the University of Helsinki, Iyambo was an active member of the Student Union, and at the same time, during the early years of his studies, in 1966–71, Iyambo represented SWAPO in Finland and the Nordic countries.

== Career ==
After Iyambo completed his medical studies, he moved to Angola and became the head of medical services in the Kwanza Sul refugee camp. Around the time of the independence of Namibia, Iyambo was among the first people in SWAPO leadership to arrive back in Namibia to prepare the country for elections as well as receiving the exiled fellow countrymen. Not insignificant was that the process of moving towards independence was led by his old acquaintance Martti Ahtisaari.

At independence in March 1990, Iyambo became Minister of Health and Social Services, serving in that post until 1996. Subsequently, he was Minister of Regional and Local Government and Housing from 1996 to 2002, Minister of Mines and Energy from 2002 to 2005, and Minister of Agriculture, Water and Forestry from 2005 to 2008. He was moved to the post of Minister of Safety and Security on 8 April 2008. After two years in that post, he was instead appointed Minister of Veteran Affairs in president Hifikepunye Pohamba's second cabinet, serving in that post from 2010 to 2015. He was SWAPO's oldest member of parliament as of 2014.

Alongside president Hage Geingob, Iyambo was sworn in as Vice President of Namibia on 21 March 2015, becoming the first person to hold that title. As vice president, he continued to head the Ministry of Veterans Affairs with two deputy ministers: Alexia Manombe-Ncube and Royal ǀUiǀoǀoo.

Speaking in April 2016, Geingob and Iyambo dismissed suggestions that Iyambo had been relegated to a largely ceremonial role. Iyambo explained that he had a full agenda of work that kept him busy until midnight every day.

In February 2018 Hage Geingob removed him from the position of vice president on the ground of poor health, and appointed Nangolo Mbumba as his successor. Iyambo retained the ministerial portfolio of Veteran Affairs and Marginalised People, and also kept his seat in parliament.

In the early morning of 19 May 2019, Namibian President Hage Geingob announced the passing of Iyambo who died at his Windhoek residency following a long illness, a day before his 83rd birthday. As an acknowledgment of his position and his achievements, Iyambo was granted a state funeral in Namibia.

== Awards and honours ==
- 2011: On 18 March 2011 President of Finland Tarja Halonen conferred Iyambo the rank of Commander, First Class, of the Order of the Lion of Finland.
- 2014: On Heroes' Day 2014 he was conferred the Most Brilliant Order of the Sun, First Class.
