= Ministry of Safety and Security (Namibia) =

Namibian government department

The Ministry of Safety and Security was a department of the Namibian government, responsible for overseeing the operations of the Namibian police and the correctional services.

== History ==
At independence of Namibia there was no dedicated ministry for the security portfolio but a Minister of State, a position occupied by Peter Tsheehama, the head of the Namibia Central Intelligence Service, until 2005. In 1995 the Ministry of Prisons and Correctional Services was established. Its minister was Marco Hausiku.

The ministry was renamed Ministry of Safety and Security in 2005, and existed until 2020 when its portfolio was added to the interior ministry, forming the Ministry of Home Affairs, Immigration, Safety and Security (MHAISS). The current minister of Home Affairs, Immigration, Safety and Security is Albert Kawana.

== Ministers ==
All security ministers in chronological order are:

#	Picture	Name	(Birth–Death)	Party	Term start	Term end
Minister of State for Security
1		Peter Tsheehama	1941–2010	SWAPO	1990	2005
Minister of Prisons and Correctional Services
2		Marco Hausiku	1953–2021	SWAPO	1995	2002
3		Andimba Toivo ya Toivo	1924–2017	SWAPO	2002	2005
Minister of Safety and Security
		Peter Tsheehama	1941–2000	SWAPO	2005	2008
4		Nickey Iyambo	1936–2019	SWAPO	2008	2010
5		Nangolo Mbumba	1941–	SWAPO	2010	2012
6		Immanuel Ngatjizeko	1952–2022	SWAPO	2012	2015
7		Charles Namoloh	1950–	SWAPO	2015	2020
Minister of Home Affairs, Immigration, Safety and Security
8		Albert Kawana	1956–	SWAPO	2020	
