= Ministry of Urban and Rural Development (Namibia) =

Government ministry of Namibia

The Ministry of Urban and Rural Development (MURD) is a department of the Government of Namibia. The ministry is responsible for regional governance (Regional Councils) and local governance (Local Authorities) and therewith plays an important role in the decentralisation process of the Namibian government.

The ministry was established at Namibian independence in 1990 as Ministry of Regional and Local Government and Housing; The first minister was Libertina Amathila. In 2000 it was renamed Ministry of Regional and Local Government, Housing and Rural Development (MRLGHRD), and it got its current name in 2015. The urban and rural development minister is Erastus Uutoni.

== Ministers ==
All urban and rural development ministers in chronological order are:

#	Picture	Name	(Birth–Death)	Party	Term start	Term end
Minister of Regional and Local Government and Housing
1		Libertina Amathila	1940–	SWAPO	1990	1996
2		Nickey Iyambo	1936–2019	SWAPO	1996	2000
Minister of Regional and Local Government, Housing and Rural Development
		Nickey Iyambo	1936–2019	SWAPO	2000	2002
3		Joel Kaapanda	1945–	SWAPO	2002	2005
4		John Pandeni	1950–2008	SWAPO	2005	2008
5		Jerry Ekandjo	1947–	SWAPO	2008	2012
6		Charles Namoloh	1950–	SWAPO	2012	2015
Minister of Urban and Rural Development
7		Sophia Shaningwa	1959–	SWAPO	2015	2018
8		Peya Mushelenga	1975–	SWAPO	2018	2020
9		Erastus Uutoni	1961–	SWAPO	2020	

== Directorates ==
The ministry is divided into five directorates:

1. Regional and Local Government and Traditional Authority Coordination — Supports the decentralised government authorities (regional, local, traditional) in Namibia in terms of capacity building and the coordination of their activities.
2. Housing, Habitat, Planning and Technical Services Coordination — Carries out support programmes to promote affordable housing for all citizens of Namibia. In 2014 the Government of Namibia launched its Mass Housing Scheme that is aimed at providing sufficient housing in the various towns and regions of Namibia until the year 2030. The program is implemented by this directorate.
3. Rural Development — Supports development outside Namibian towns, especially in defined growth point. Its aim is to provide a high living standards the rural population and therewith reduce the rate of rural-urban migration.
4. Directorate for Decentralisation Coordination — Supports the ongoing decentralisation process within the Namibian government system and oversees the process of handing various mandates from central government to regional and local authorities annually.
5. Finance, Human Resources, Administration and Information Technology — Is the administrative directorate of the ministry and ensures its efficient service delivery.

== Agencies ==
The ministry can create semi-independent agencies to operate within its directorates.

The Local Economic Development Agency (LEDA) is an agency that came into being with the launch of the Namibian Local Economic Development White Paper in July 2011. It has since hosted an annual conference for LED practitioners at Local Authorities and Regional Councils throughout Namibia. The agency supports the decentralised Namibian government authorities in creating enabling business environments. Its services are categorised as capacity building, LED strategy development, LED strategy implementation, funding and networking. The agency currently has offices in Windhoek and Oshakati.
