= Loide Kasingo =

Namibian politician (born 1954)

The Honourable Professor Loide Kasingo

Deputy Speaker of Parliament
- In office 21 March 2010 – 20 March 2025
- President: Hifikepunye Pohamba; Hage Geingob
- Prime Minister: Nahas Angula; Hage Geingob; Saara Kuugongelwa

Deputy Minister of Home Affairs
- In office 2000–2005
- President: Sam Nujoma
- Prime Minister: Hage Geingob; Theo-Ben Gurirab

Deputy Minister of Regional and Local Government and Housing
- In office 1996–2000
- President: Sam Nujoma
- Prime Minister: Hage Geingob
- Preceded by: Jerry Ekandjo

Personal details
- Born: 17 February 1954 (age 72) Oshikoto Region
- Party: SWAPO
- Education: University of the North, South Africa

Loide Lucky Shoopala Kasingo (born 17 February 1954) is a Namibian politician and prominent trade unionist. A member of the South West Africa People's Organization (SWAPO), Kasingo has been a member of the National Assembly of Namibia since 1996 and was a deputy minister from 1996 to 2005. She has served as Deputy Speaker of Parliament since 2010.

== Early life and education ==
Born in Oshikoto Region in 1954, Kasingo studied at Ongwediva High School in Ongwediva in 1971. She then moved on to the University of the North in South Africa, where she graduated from with a Bachelor of Jurisprudence in 1978. After taking various courses in Marketing Management in South Africa from 1983 to 1984, Kasingo was sent to Turin, Italy for training at the International Labour Organization (ILO). In 1987, she earned a diploma in Training Methodology for Trade Union Instructors from the ILO.

== Career ==
Kasingo rose to prominence as a key figure in the late 1980s as part of the National Union of Namibian Workers, a SWAPO-affiliated trade union. From 1989 to 1985, she was an adult literacy instructor for the Namibia Literacy Program and the Council of Churches in Namibia. Following independence in 1990, Kasingo continued as a high-level member of NUNW in various functions.

When she was chosen by President Sam Nujoma to replace Ben Ulenga in the National Assembly and as Deputy Minister of Local and Regional Government and Housing. Kasingo was a public prosecutor from 1990 to 1996 for the Ministry of Justice in the Windhoek courts. From 2000 to 2005, she was the Deputy Minister of Home Affairs. Upon the election of Hifikepunye Pohamba in 2004, Kasingo was removed as deputy minister. Despite her demotion, she was ranked eleventh on SWAPO's list of candidates for the National Assembly, virtually guaranteeing her a place on the body, albeit as backbencher.

Kasingo has been Deputy Speaker of Parliament since 2010. She is also vice-president of the Pan African Parliament since May 2012.

== Awards ==
Kasingo was awarded The Most Brilliant Order of the Sun second-class for his distinguished service above the call of duty, in August 2024 by President Nangolo Mbumba. In September 2011, Kasingo was named an honorary professor at Jilin University in China.
