= Ngarikutuke Tjiriange =

Namibian politician (1943–2021)

The Honourable Ngarikutuke Tjiriange

Minister of Veteran Affairs
- In office 2006 – 21 March 2010
- President: Hifikepunye Pohamba
- Preceded by: position established
- Succeeded by: Nickey Iyambo

Minister without portfolio
- In office 2003–2006
- President: Sam Nujoma; Hifikepunye Pohamba

Minister of Justice
- In office 21 March 1990 – 2003
- President: Sam Nujoma
- Preceded by: position established

Personal details
- Born: 12 July 1943 South West Africa
- Died: 23 June 2021 (aged 77)
- Party: SWAPO
- Occupation: Lawyer

Ngarikutuke Ernest Tjiriange (12 July 1943 – 23 June 2021) was a Namibian politician, a member of the National Assembly and former secretary-general of the ruling SWAPO Party. He also served in the Namibian cabinet from 1990 to 2010, first as Minister of Justice, then without portfolio, and then as Minister of Veteran Affairs.

== Career ==
Tjiriange, born in Windhoek, studied law at Leningrad State University and received a doctorate from Kyiv University in 1973. After doing research at the International Institute for Labour Studies in Switzerland in 1974 and the International Institute of Human Rights in France in 1975, he was an assistant professor at the United Nations Institute for Namibia in Lusaka, Zambia from 1977 to 1982. He became the principal legal advisor of SWAPO in 1970.

Tjiriange was a SWAPO member of the Constituent Assembly, which was in place from November 1989 to March 1990, immediately prior to Namibia's independence. At independence in 1990, he became a member of the National Assembly.

He became Minister of Justice in 1990, serving in that post for thirteen years; he was additionally Attorney-General from March 2000 to January 2001. He was nominated as Secretary-General of SWAPO by President Sam Nujoma at the party's August 2002 congress, and he was elected to that post. It was decided at the congress to make the position of Secretary-General a full-time job, but Tjiriange remained Justice Minister until May 8, 2003, at which point he was instead appointed Minister without portfolio. In the November 2004 parliamentary election, he was first on SWAPO's candidate list. He resigned from the National Assembly, as well as from his post as Minister without portfolio, in February 2005 in order to receive payment of a pension; however, he was reappointed Minister without Portfolio by the newly sworn in President Hifikepunye Pohamba on March 21, 2005. The opposition Congress of Democrats was critical of the decision to keep Tjiriange in the Cabinet without a ministerial portfolio, arguing that he would effectively receive a salary out of taxpayer money for doing party work as SWAPO Secretary-General. On October 4, 2006, he was appointed by Pohamba as Minister of Veteran Affairs upon the creation of that ministry.

At SWAPO's November 2007 congress, Tjiriange failed to be re-elected to the party's politburo. On January 27, 2008, he was elected as SWAPO's Secretary for Environment at a meeting of the Central Committee.

Ngarikutuke Tjiriange announced in September 2009 that he would withdraw from active politics to devote more time to farming, but remained a member of the central committee and the secretariat of the Swapo Party. In his farewell speech on 16 March 2010 for the National assembly, Ngarikutuke urged his successors to deal with the land question, in particular the access to grave sites of ancestors.

After his resignation, Tjiriange presented himself as a prominent advocate against legislation for equal rights of homosexuals in Africa. His prominent presence in the media has earned him a re-entry into politics as of April 2012 when he was appointed special adviser to Home Affairs and Immigration Minister Rosalia Nghidinwa to bring about all-round improvement at the Ministry.

Tjiriange died on 23 June 2021 from COVID-19. He was declared a national hero of Namibia and awarded a state funeral.
