= Alpheus ǃNaruseb =

Namibian politician (born 1954)

The Honourable Alpheus ǃNaruseb

Minister of Agriculture, Water and Forestry
- In office 2018–2020
- President: Hage Geingob
- Preceded by: John Mutorwa
- Succeeded by: Calle Schlettwein

Minister of Works and Transport
- In office 2015–2018
- President: Hage Geingob
- Preceded by: Erkki Nghimtina
- Succeeded by: John Mutorwa

Minister of Lands and Resettlement
- In office 2008–2015
- President: Hifikepunye Pohamba
- Preceded by: Jerry Ekandjo
- Succeeded by: Utoni Nujoma

Minister of Labour and Social Welfare
- In office 2005–2008
- President: Hifikepunye Pohamba
- Preceded by: Marlene Mungunda
- Succeeded by: Immanuel Ngatjizeko

Deputy Minister of Justice
- In office 2003–2005
- President: Sam Nujoma

Deputy Minister of Fisheries and Marine Resources
- In office 1997–2003
- President: Sam Nujoma

Personal details
- Born: Alpheus |Gou-!na !Naruseb; 20 March 1954 (age 72) Usakos
- Party: South West Africa People's Organization (SWAPO)

Alpheus ǀGou-ǃna ǃNaruseb (born 20 March 1954) is a Namibian politician who has served in the cabinet of Namibia in various portfolios. A member of the South West Africa People's Organization (SWAPO), !Naruseb has served in the cabinet since 1997 and the National Assembly since 1995.

== Early life and education ==
ǃNaruseb was born on 20 March 1954 in Usakos, Erongo Region. From 1970 to 1975, he attended Martin Luther High School in Okombahe. Thereafter, he worked for Rössing Uranium in several positions. He has also studied towards a Bachelor of Laws (L.L.B.) at the University of Namibia.

== Political career ==
ǃNaruseb joined SWAPO in 1975 at the age of 21. The next year he began working as a maintenance planner at the Rössing Uranium Mine in Arandis, which lasted until 1980. In that year, he became industrial relations officer at the Mine, which lasted until independence in 1990. During the run-up to independence the late 1980s, he was the internal SWAPO secretary for economic affairs. Following a stint as head organiser of mass organisations in SWAPO from 1990 to 1991, he joined the SWAPO central committee in that year. From 1992 to 2002, ǃNaruseb was the head of information and publicity in the SWAPO Party. He also was selected to the National Assembly in 1995.

In 1997, ǃNaruseb was appointed deputy Minister of Fisheries and Marine Resources, which lasted until his move to deputy Minister of Justice in 2003. In 2005 he was promoted to Minister of Labour and Social Welfare under the newly elected president Hifikepunye Pohamba. In 2008, !Naruseb was shuffled to the post of Minister of Lands and Resettlement, replacing Jerry Ekandjo. ǃNaruseb expressed frustration at the pace of land reform in Namibia, suggesting that the law be changed to "prioritise the resettlement of the most needy".

Under president Hage Geingob, ǃNaruseb was appointed as Minister of Works and Transport in March 2015. in 2018 he was shuffled to the post of Minister of Agriculture, Water and Forestry. He resigned from his political posts in 2020. ǃNaruseb was announced Chief Whip of the SWAPO Party in February 2026, a position previously held by Uahekua Herunga, who resigned from parliament and subsequently from his position as a Chief Whip and chairperson of House Committee.

== Awards ==
In 2024, ǃNaruseb was awarded The Most Brilliant Order of the Sun second-class.
