= Ministry of Gender Equality and Social Welfare (Namibia) =

Government ministry of Namibia

The Ministry of Gender Equality and Social Welfare is a department of the Namibian government. It was established in 2000 under the name Ministry of Women Affairs and Child Welfare, before that the portfolio was a directorate in the Office of the President. The first minister was Netumbo Nandi-Ndaitwah. In 2005 the ministry was renamed Ministry of Gender Equality and Child Welfare (MGECW).

In 2020 the ministry was merged with the Ministry of Poverty Eradication and Social Welfare, and renamed Ministry of Gender Equality, Poverty Eradication and Social Welfare (MGEPESW). Since then it falls under the Office of the President. It still has a dedicated minister, currently Doreen Sioka.

== Ministers ==
All gender equality and social welfare ministers in chronological order are:

#	Picture	Name	(Birth–Death)	Party	Term start	Term end
Minister of Women Affairs and Child Welfare
1		Netumbo Nandi-Ndaitwah	1952–	SWAPO	2000	2005
Minister of Gender Equality and Child Welfare
2		Marlene Mungunda	1954–	SWAPO	2005	2010
3		Doreen Sioka	1960–	SWAPO	2010	2012
4		Rosalia Nghidinwa	1952–2018	SWAPO	2012	2015
5		Doreen Sioka	1960–	SWAPO	2015	2020
Minister of Gender Equality, Poverty Eradication and Social Welfare
5		Doreen Sioka	1960–	SWAPO	2020	2025
6		Emma Kantema-Gaomas	1978–	SWAPO	2025	
