= Marco Hausiku =

Namibian politician (1953–2021)

The Honourable Marco Hausiku
- Hausiku in 2013

Deputy secretary-general of SWAPO
- In office 26 November 2017 – 26 August 2021
- President: Hage Geingob
- Prime Minister: Saara Kuugongelwa
- Preceded by: Laura McLeod-Katjirua

Deputy-Prime Minister of Namibia
- In office 21 March 2010 – 21 March 2015
- President: Hifikepunye Pohamba
- Prime Minister: Nahas Angula; Hage Geingob
- Preceded by: Libertina Amathila
- Succeeded by: Netumbo Nandi-Ndaitwah

Minister of Foreign Affairs
- In office 27 May 2004 – 21 March 2010
- President: Sam Nujoma; Hifikepunye Pohamba
- Prime Minister: Theo-Ben Gurirab; Nahas Angula
- Preceded by: Hidipo Hamutenya
- Succeeded by: Utoni Nujoma

Minister of Labour
- In office 27 August 2002 – 27 May 2004
- President: Sam Nujoma
- Prime Minister: Theo-Ben Gurirab
- Preceded by: Andimba Toivo ya Toivo
- Succeeded by: Marlene Mungunda

Minister of Prisons and Correctional Services
- In office 1995 – 27 August 2002
- President: Sam Nujoma
- Prime Minister: Hage Geingob
- Preceded by: position established
- Succeeded by: Andimba Toivo ya Toivo

Minister of Works, Transport and Communication
- In office 1992–1995
- President: Sam Nujoma
- Prime Minister: Hage Geingob
- Preceded by: Richard Kapelwa Kabajani
- Succeeded by: Hampie Plichta

Minister of Lands, Resettlement and Rehabilitation
- In office 21 March 1990 – 1992
- President: Sam Nujoma
- Prime Minister: Hage Geingob
- Preceded by: position established
- Succeeded by: Richard Kapelwa Kabajani

Personal details
- Born: 25 November 1953 Kapako, Okavango Region, South West Africa
- Died: 26 August 2021 (aged 67)
- Party: SWAPO

Marco Mukoso Hausiku (25 November 1953 – 26 August 2021) was a Namibian politician who was Deputy-Prime Minister of Namibia from 2010 to 2015.

Previously, he served as Minister of Foreign Affairs from 2004 to 2010. In 2017 he was elected as the deputy secretary general of the Swapo Party at the party's 6th congress.

== Life and career ==
Hausiku was born on 25 November 1953 in Kapako, Okavango Region (now Kavango West). Immediately prior to independence, Hausiku was a SWAPO delegate to the Constituent Assembly which was in place from November 1989 to March 1990, and since 1990 he has been a member of the National Assembly of Namibia. He served as Minister of Lands, Resettlement and Rehabilitation from 1990 to 1992, as Minister of Works, Transport and Communication from 1992 to March 1995 and as Minister of Prisons and Correctional Services from March 1995 to August 2002. He was appointed as Minister of Labour on 27 August 2002, and after nearly two years in that position he was appointed as Minister of Foreign Affairs by president Sam Nujoma on 27 May 2004. This appointment followed Nujoma's dismissal of the previous foreign minister, Hidipo Hamutenya, in the midst of a struggle within SWAPO regarding the nomination of a presidential candidate.

Hausiku received the 16th highest number of votes, 345, in the election to the central committee of SWAPO at the party's August 2002 congress. He was SWAPO's Secretary for External Relations as of January 2008.

Amidst a push for new faces in the National Assembly, Hausiku opted not to seek a spot on the SWAPO list for the 2014 election. After leaving parliament, he was designated as rector of the Swapo Party School, which was launched in May 2016. He was intended to serve as rector in an interim capacity for the school's first year.

== Death ==
Hausiku died on 26 August 2021 at the age of 68, during the COVID-19 pandemic in Namibia, from post-COVID-19 complications. He was buried at Heroes' Acre outside Windhoek on 11 September.

Hausiku's widow, Toini Mwahangange Hausiku, who also served as the Deputy Mayor of Rundu Town Council, also passed on at the age of 72, on the 19 July 2026.
