= Immanuel Ngatjizeko =

Namibian politician (1952–2022)

The Honourable Immanuel Ngatjizeko MP
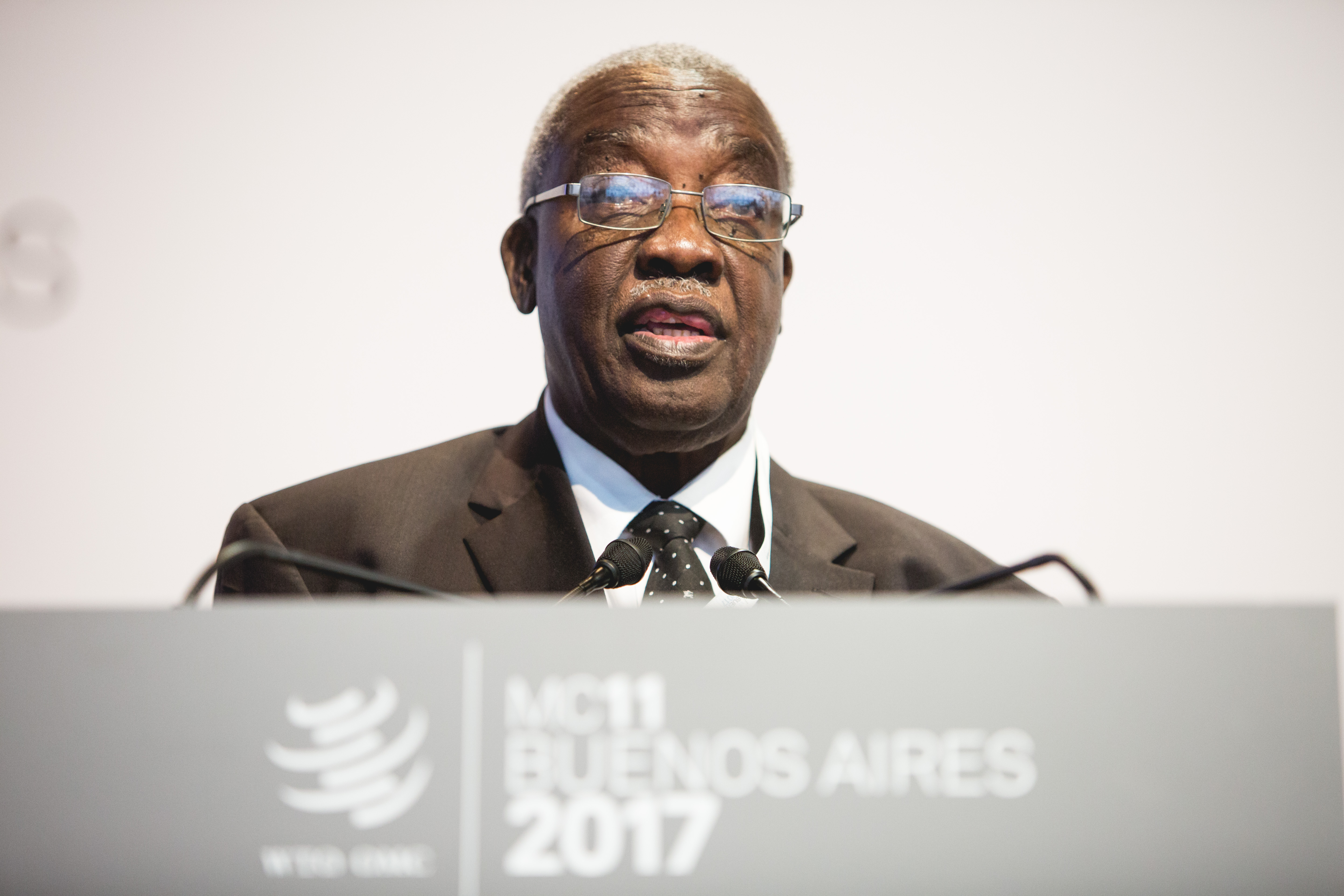
- Ngatjizeko in 2017

Minister of Presidential Affairs
- In office February 2018 – February 2018
- President: Hage Geingob
- Preceded by: Frans Kapofi
- Succeeded by: Martin Andjaba

Minister of Trade and Industry
- In office March 2015 – February 2018
- President: Hage Geingob
- Preceded by: Calle Schlettwein
- Succeeded by: Tjekero Tweya
- In office 2005–2008
- President: Hifikepunye Pohamba
- Preceded by: Hidipo Hamutenya
- Succeeded by: Hage Geingob

Minister of Safety and Security
- In office December 2012 – March 2015
- President: Hifikepunye Pohamba
- Preceded by: Nangolo Mbumba
- Succeeded by: Charles Namoloh

Minister of Labour and Social Welfare
- In office 2008 – December 2012
- President: Hifikepunye Pohamba
- Preceded by: Alpheus ǃNaruseb
- Succeeded by: Doreen Sioka

Director-General of the National Planning Commission
- In office 2003 – March 2012
- President: Sam Nujoma
- Preceded by: Saara Kuugongelwa-Amadhila

Deputy Minister of Mines and Energy
- In office March 2000 – March 2005
- President: Sam Nujoma
- Succeeded by: Doreen Sioka

Personal details
- Born: 30 May 1952 Otjohorongo, South West Africa
- Died: 5 March 2022 (aged 69)
- Party: SWAPO
- Education: University of Fort Hare
- Occupation: Politician
- Profession: Accountant

Immanuel Ngatjizeko (30 May 1952 – 5 March 2022) was a Namibian politician and member of the ruling SWAPO Party. He held five ministerial portfolios from 2003 until his retirement in 2018.

== Early life and education ==
Immanuel Ngatjizeko was born in Otjohorongo, a village near Omaruru in Namibia's central Erongo Region. He attended the Augustineum Secondary School in Windhoek and then went to study at Fort Hare in South Africa. He graduated with a Diploma in Commerce and Administration in 1976.

After his return to South West Africa he worked at the Council of Churches in Namibia until 1994, heading its Finance Department. He then started working full time for SWAPO, first as Managing Director of its investment company Zebra Holdings, and from 1997 as party Secretary for Finance.

== Political career ==
Ngatjizeko was a SWAPO party organiser from 1978. He served on the Internal National Executive Committee before Namibian independence. He was elected to SWAPO's Central Committee in 1991, and to the politburo in 2007.

Ngatjizeko was a member of Parliament from 2000, and member of the Cabinet from 2003, when he was appointed Director-General of the National Planning Commission, a position equivalent to that of a minister. From 2000 to 2005, he also served as Deputy Minister of Mines and Energy. In the 2005–2010 cabinet Ngatjizeko was first Minister of Trade and Industry and from 2008 Minister of Labour and Social Welfare. In the 2010–2015 cabinet he served as Minister of Labour and Social Welfare until 2012, and as Minister of Safety and Security for the remainder of the legislative period.

Under President Hage Geingob, Ngatjizeko moved back to the post of Minister of Industrialisation, Trade and SME Development in March 2015. In a Cabinet reshuffle in February 2018 he became Minister of Presidential Affairs but resigned shortly thereafter and retired due to health issues.

== Personal life ==
Ngatjizeko died on 5 March 2022, at the age of 69.

== Awards and recognition ==
On Heroes' Day 2014 he was conferred the Most Brilliant Order of the Sun, Second Class.
