= Max Hamata =

- Occupations: Journalist, editor
- Years active: 1991–present
- Title: The Confidente
- Website: www.confidente.com.na

Max Shali Nghilifa Hamata (born in the Katutura suburb of Windhoek) is a controversial Namibian journalist and muckraker. He is the editor of The Confidente. Hamata previously worked as the editor of a Namibian weekly tabloid newspaper Informante, owned by TrustCo.
