= Armas Amukwiyu =

Namibian businessman and politician

Armas Amukwiyu (born 22 April 1976) is a Namibian businessman and politician. He is a member of the ruling SWAPO party, and is the SWAPO Party Regional Coordinator for the Oshikoto Region and the chairperson of the SWAPO party's regional coordinators forum. He ran but lost as a candidate for Secretary-General of SWAPO.
