= Confidente =

Tabloid newspaper in Namibia

The Confidente
- Type: Weekly newspaper
- Format: Broadsheet
- Editor: Max Hamata
- Founded: 2011
- Language: English and Oshiwambo
- Headquarters: Windhoek West
- Price: NAD 5.00
- Website: www.confidentenamibia.com

The Confidente is a weekly tabloid newspaper in Namibia. It was established by Max Hamata in 2011 as a weekly newspaper. It publishes in English.
