= Jerry Ekandjo =

Namibian politician

The Honourable Jerry Ekandjo

Minister of Youth, National Service, Sport and Culture
- In office 4 December 2012 – 1 February 2018
- Preceded by: Kazenambo Kazenambo
- Succeeded by: Erastus Uutoni

Minister of Regional and Local Government, Housing and Rural Development
- In office 8 April 2008 – 4 December 2012
- Preceded by: John Pandeni
- Succeeded by: Charles Namoloh

Minister of Lands and Resettlement
- In office 21 March 2005 – 8 April 2008
- Preceded by: Hifikepunye Pohamba
- Succeeded by: Alpheus ǃNaruseb

Minister of Home Affairs
- In office September 1995 – 21 March 2005
- Preceded by: Hifikepunye Pohamba
- Succeeded by: Rosalia Nghidinwa

Deputy Minister of Home Affairs
- In office 21 March 1995 – September 1995

Deputy Minister of Regional and Local Government and Housing
- In office 1990–1995
- Preceded by: position established
- Succeeded by: Loide Kasingo

Personal details
- Born: 17 March 1947 (age 79) Windhoek, South-West Africa
- Party: SWAPO
- Spouse: Loide Ndapewa Ekandjo
- Children: 3
- Profession: Politician, Teacher

Jerry Lukiiko Ekandjo (born 17 March 1947) is a Namibian politician, former anti-apartheid activist and political prisoner. He is one of the founding members of the SWAPO Youth League and has been one of the most active internal leading members of the South West Africa People's Organization (SWAPO) during the liberation struggle. He spent eight years in prison on Robben Island after being charged for inciting violence in 1973.

Ekandjo has been a member of the cabinet of Namibia from independence in 1990 until 2018, serving the SWAPO government in various ministerial positions. His last appointment was Minister of Youth, National Service, Sport and Culture, from which he was recalled in early 2018. In 2012 he was a candidate for the vice-president of SWAPO and came second to Hage Geingob who eventually became the president of Namibia in 2015. In 2017, Ekandjo was nominated as a candidate for the president of SWAPO and came second again to Hage Geingob.

== Political career ==
Ekandjo was born on 17 March 1947 in Windhoek, South-West Africa. He was a member of the SWAPO Party Youth League from 1969 to 1973 and served as chairman of its Windhoek branch. In August 1973 he was arrested, and in November 1973 he was put on trial for incitement of violence. He was convicted and sentenced to eight years in prison, which he spent on Robben Island in South Africa. Following his release in 1981, he was a teacher from 1982 to 1987, and in 1989, he was the deputy head of SWAPO voter registration.

Immediately prior to independence, he was a SWAPO member of the Constituent Assembly, which was in place from November 1989 to March 1990, and since independence in 1990, he has served as a member of the National Assembly of Namibia. He also became deputy Minister of Regional and Local Government and Housing in 1990, serving in that position until 1995. He was deputy Minister of Home Affairs from March 1995 until being promoted to the post of Minister of Home Affairs in September 1995. After nearly ten years as Minister of Home Affairs, Ekandjo was moved to the post of Minister of Lands and Resettlement on March 21, 2005.

He received the highest number of votes, 395 (tied with Nahas Angula), in the election to the central committee of SWAPO at the party's August 2002 congress. It was reported that at the time of the November 2007 SWAPO congress, some in the party wanted Ekandjo to become the party's vice president, although at the congress Hage Geingob was elected to the post without opposition. Ekandjo is widely considered to be a hardliner in the party. He received the highest number of votes in the election for the SWAPO central committee at the November 2007 congress. On January 27, 2008, he was elected as SWAPO's secretary for information and publicity at a central committee meeting, a move that was considered surprising given Ekandjo's reputation for having a harsh attitude toward the media.

Ekandjo was moved from his post as Minister of Lands and Resettlement to that of Minister of Regional and Local Government, Housing, and Rural Development in a cabinet reshuffle on 8 April 2008. At SWAPO's 2012 party congress, Ekandjo stood as a candidate for SWAPO vice president, but he was defeated by Hage Geingob in the vote held on 2 December 2012. Geingob received 312 votes from the delegates, while Ekandjo received 220 votes and Pendukeni Iivula-Ithana received 64 votes. In the wake of the congress, Ekandjo was moved to the post of Minister of Youth, National Service, Sport and Culture as part of a cabinet reshuffle on 4 December 2012.

In late August 2014, when SWAPO chose its list of parliamentary candidates for the November 2014 general election, Ekandjo only managed to obtain the 81st spot on the list, a poor performance that made it seem unlikely that he would be elected to the National Assembly. Although he failed to make it into parliament in the election, he was subsequently chosen by President Hage Geingob as one of his eight presidential appointees to the National Assembly. Geingob also retained Ekandjo as Minister of Sport, Youth, and National Service when he named his cabinet in March 2015.

For the 2017 SWAPO electoral congress, Ekandjo campaigned against President Geingob, calling the leadership of the government and ruling party "weak". He was dismissed from his minister position on 1 February 2018, along with fellow critic and minister Iivula-Ithana. Erastus Uutoni took over the youth, sport, and culture portfolio from him. Ekandjo resigned his seat in parliament in late 2019.

== Views and controversies ==
Ekandjo is known for his "repeated and long-standing pattern of making hateful statements, taking undemocratic decisions, and refusing to comply with court orders". Human rights activist Phil ya Nangoloh judged him as being homophobic, public policy commentator Graham Hopwood sees a "track record of uttering hateful statements", and The Namibian diagnoses a "lack of political tolerance".

In 2000, Ekandjo, during a speech as home affairs minister, urged 700 graduated police officers to eliminate homosexuals from Namibia: "Eliminate gays and lesbians from the face of Namibia. If they have a gay dog, kill it". This caused great controversy in Namibia. When pressed by a journalist to confirm whether he had said these words or not, Ekandjo replied: "Have the homosexuals there sent you? Let the homosexuals themselves phone me, then I can give them the answer. In Namibia they are happy about my statement". The opposition Democratic Turnhalle Alliance and United Democratic Front put forward a motion of no-confidence against Ekandjo, but in the vote on October 11, 2000, SWAPO MPs voted unanimously against the motion.

On 9 February 2001, Ekandjo was found guilty of contempt of court for not releasing the jailed former representative of the Angolan rebel group UNITA in Namibia, José Domingo Sikunda, despite a court order to do so. The government said that it would appeal Ekandjo's conviction.

Ekandjo, through his status as a minister, has worked to reduce the prevalence of AIDS in Namibia. He has been quoted as saying "Surely one of the main lessons of these past 25 years is that when we are united we win, when we are divided, AIDS wins".
