= Utoni Nujoma =

Namibian politician

The Honourable Utoni Nujoma
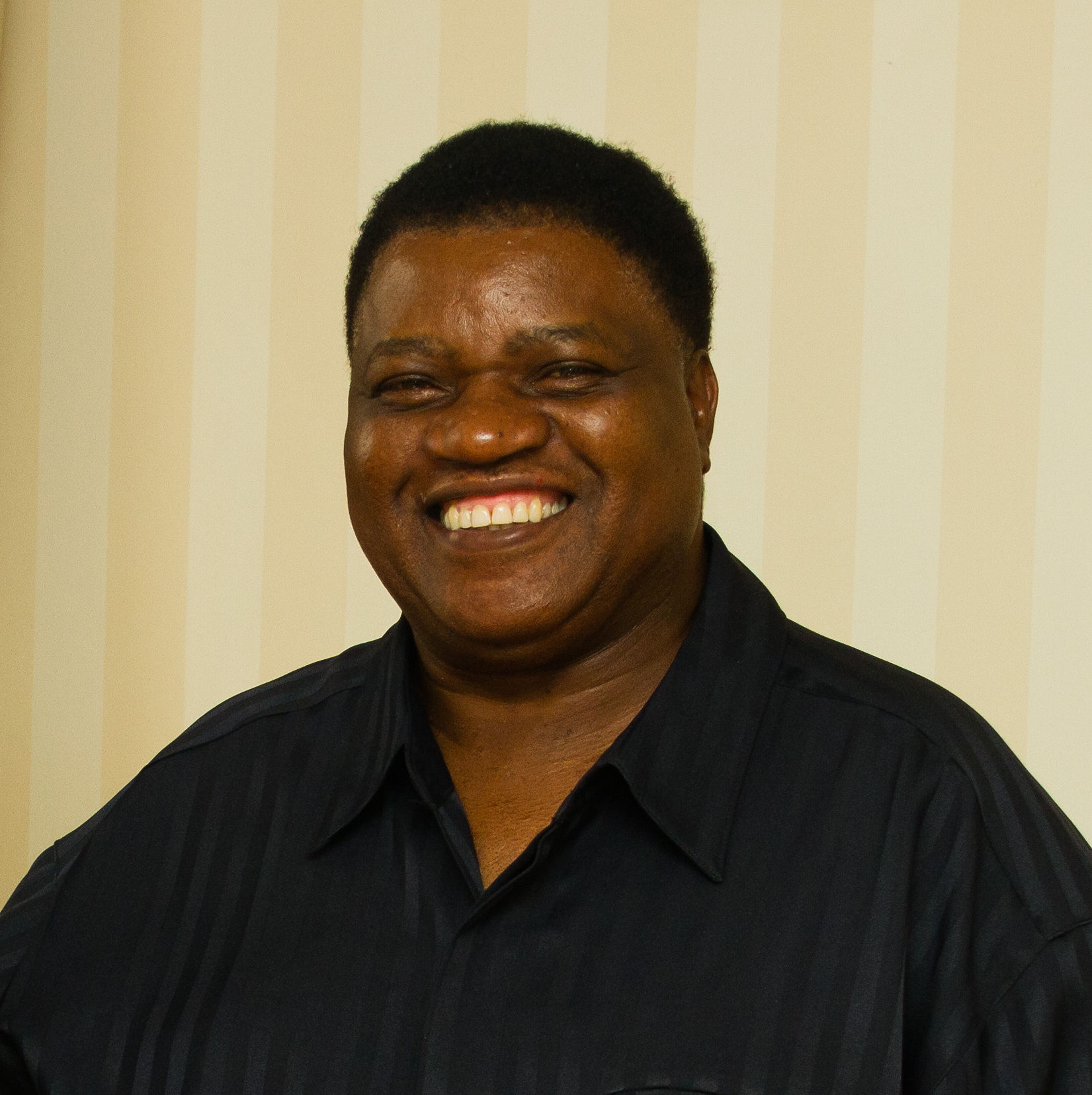

Minister of Labour, Industrial Relations and Employment Creation
- In office 22 March 2020 – 21 March 2025
- President: Hage Geingob; Nangolo Mbumba
- Preceded by: Erkki Nghimtina
- Succeeded by: position abolished

Minister of Land Reform
- In office 21 March 2015 – 22 March 2020
- President: Hage Geingob
- Preceded by: Alpheus ǃNaruseb
- Succeeded by: Calle Schlettwein

Minister of Justice
- In office 4 December 2012 – 21 March 2015
- President: Hifikepunye Pohamba
- Preceded by: Pendukeni Iivula-Ithana
- Succeeded by: Albert Kawana

Minister of Foreign Affairs
- In office 21 March 2010 – 4 December 2012
- President: Hifikepunye Pohamba
- Preceded by: Marco Hausiku
- Succeeded by: Netumbo Nandi-Ndaitwah

Deputy Minister of Justice
- In office 4 December 2004 – 21 March 2010
- President: Sam Nujoma; Hifikepunye Pohamba

Personal details
- Born: Utoni Daniel Nujoma; 8 September 1952 (age 74) Windhoek, South-West Africa
- Party: SWAPO
- Children: Sam Nujoma jr.
- Parent(s): Sam Nujoma (father); Kovambo Nujoma (mother)
- Relatives: Aaron Mushimba (uncle)
- Education: University of Warwick; Lund University
- Occupation: Politician
- Religion: Lutheran

Utoni Daniel Nujoma (born 8 September 1952) is a Namibian politician who has served as Minister of Labour, Industrial Relations and Employment Creation since March 2020. He has served in various government ministerial positions in the government since 2010.

Nujoma is also a member of both the central committee and the politburo of SWAPO. He is the first-born son of Namibia's founding President Sam Nujoma, who was in office as president from 1990 to 2005, and Kovambo Nujoma, the former First Lady of Namibia.

== Education and early life ==
Nujoma was born in Windhoek's Old Location (now Hochland Park) and raised by his mother Kovambo, as his father, SWAPO leader Sam Nujoma left for exile when Utoni was eight years old. He attended Rhenish Missionary School in Windhoek and later the Augustineum but was expelled in 1972 due to his political activity. In May 1974, Nujoma and his two brothers John and Sacky left to join their father in exile in Angola.

In 1974, Nujoma was sent to the Soviet Union to receive training in guerrilla warfare. After his return to Zambia, he was stationed at the People's Liberation Army of Namibia's military base of Shaatotwa. After Angola became independent in 1975, he was transferred there. In 1986, Nujoma was sent to Cuba for studies in political science; he returned home to South-West Africa in 1988. After the independence of Namibia, he graduated with an LLB degree from the University of Warwick in England, United Kingdom (1990) and with an LL.M. degree from Lund University in Sweden (1996).

== Political career ==
Nujoma served as deputy permanent secretary in the Ministry of Justice between 1992 and 1997. He was first elected to the central committee of SWAPO at the party's August 2002 congress, receiving 316 votes and placing 22nd out of the 57 members elected. He has served as a member of the National Assembly of Namibia and became Deputy Minister of Justice in 2004. He received the second highest number of votes in the election for members of the central committee at SWAPO's November 2007 congress.

Nujoma was promoted to Minister of Foreign Affairs in 2010. In the wake of the December 2012 SWAPO congress and the subsequent cabinet reshuffle, Nujoma became Minister of Justice, succeeding Pendukeni Iivula-Ithana. Nujoma was appointed as Minister of Land Reform by President Hage Geingob in March 2015. In 2020, he was appointed to lead the Minister of Labour, Industrial Relations and Employment Creation.
