= Ministry of Foreign Affairs (Namibia) =

The Ministry of International Relations and Trade is a department of the Namibian government. It was established as Ministry of Foreign Affairs at Namibian independence in 1990. The first Namibian foreign minister was Theo-Ben Gurirab. The current minister is Selma Ashipala-Musavyi.

== Names and portfolios ==
The Ministry of Foreign Affairs, as it was named since independence, was renamed Ministry of International Relations and Cooperation at the start of the 2015–2020 legislative period. In 2025 the Ministry of Trade and Industry was dissolved, and the trade portfolio was given to the foreign ministry, resulting in its current name.

== Ministers ==
All foreign ministers in chronological order are:

#	Picture	Name	(Birth–Death)	Party	Term start	Term end
Minister of Foreign Affairs
1		Theo-Ben Gurirab	1938–2018	SWAPO	1990	2002
2		Hidipo Hamutenya	1939–2016	SWAPO	2002	2004
3		Marco Hausiku	1953–2021	SWAPO	2004	2010
4		Utoni Nujoma	1952–	SWAPO	2010	2012
5		Netumbo Nandi-Ndaitwah	1954–	SWAPO	2012	2015
Minister of International Relations and Cooperation
		Netumbo Nandi-Ndaitwah	1954–	SWAPO	2015	2024
6		Peya Mushelenga	1975–	SWAPO	2024	2025
Minister of International Relations and Trade
7		Selma Ashipala-Musavyi	1960–	SWAPO	2025	
