= Sophia Shaningwa =

Namibian politician

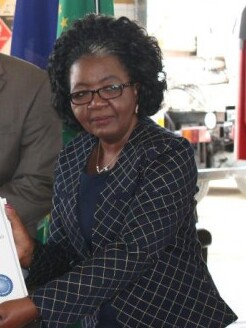
- Shaningwa in 2016
- Born: 13 May 1959 (age 67); Outapi
- Citizenship: Namibia
- Education: Ivanova Teacher's training college in the Soviet Union
- Occupation: Politician
- Known for: Secretary general of the SWAPO party
- Notable work: Appointed governor of Khomas region in 2004 Governor of Omusati region in 2014
- Awards: Most Distinguished order of Namibia: first class on Heroes Day 2014

Sophia Shaningwa (born 13 May 1959 in Outapi) is a Namibian politician, currently serving as secretary general of the SWAPO party.

== Education ==
Shaningwa left Namibia for exile in May 1980 and underwent military training as a People's Liberation Army of Namibia (PLAN) combatant. She studied at Ivanova Teachers' Training College in the Soviet Union.

== Political career ==
Shaningwa was appointed governor of Khomas Region in 2004. She later served as the Governor of the Omusati Region. In 2014, she was elected to the National Assembly. She had previously worked at the National Housing Enterprise and served as Windhoek West councillor.

Shaningwa served as Minister for Urban and Rural Development from 21 March 2015 to February 2018 in President Hage Geingob's administration. During that time, her ministry was awarded a cheque by Samlam to eliminate the bucket toilet system, because sanitation and hygiene are believed to be a major challenge in the rural areas. In 2017, Shaningwa was elected secretary general of SWAPO. Shaningwa retained this position in 2022, defeating Oshikoto SWAPO Regional Coordinator Armas Amukwiyu.

== Awards ==
Shaningwa was conferred the Most Distinguished Order of Namibia: First Class on Heroes' Day 2014.
