= Rosalia Nghidinwa =

Namibian politician

Minister of Gender Equality and Child Welfare
- In office 4 December 2012 – 2015
- Preceded by: Doreen Sioka
- Succeeded by: Doreen Sioka

Minister of Home Affairs and Immigration
- In office 2005–2012
- Preceded by: Jerry Ekandjo
- Succeeded by: Pendukeni Iivula-Ithana

Personal details
- Born: Rosalia Annette Nghidinwa; 26 October 1952 South West Africa
- Died: 14 January 2018 (aged 65) Windhoek
- Party: SWAPO
- Occupation: Nurse

Rosalia Annette Nghidinwa (26 October 1952 – 14 January 2018) was a Namibian politician.

Born in Nkurenkuru, Kavango Region, Nghidinwa joined SWAPO in 1974 at the age of 22. A health worker by profession, Nghidinwa ran several community health centres in the Okavango Region for the Evangelical Lutheran Church in Namibia (ELCIN). She represented the ELCIN at the Lutheran World Conference in 1987 and served on the Church's governing council from 1991 to 1996.

She was a member of the National Assembly of Namibia since 2000. She also entered cabinet of Namibia after being appointed deputy Minister of Labour and Social Welfare from 2000 to 2005. In 2005 she was promoted to Minister of Home Affairs and Immigration, and in December 2012 she was moved to head the Ministry of Gender Equality and Social Welfare (Namibia).

Nghidinwa was awarded the Most Excellent Order of the Eagle in 2003. She was married to Sam Nghidinwa who died in February 2009. They had 6 children. Nghidinwa died in a Windhoek hospital on 14 January 2018 after suffering from cancer.
