= Pendukeni Iivula-Ithana =

Namibian politician

The Honourable Pendukeni Iivula-Ithana MP

Minister of Home Affairs
- In office 4 December 2012 – 1 February 2018
- President: Hage Geingob; Hifikepunye Pohamba
- Preceded by: Rosalia Nghidinwa
- Succeeded by: Frans Kapofi

Secretary general of SWAPO
- In office December 2007 – 4 December 2012
- President: Hifikepunye Pohamba
- Preceded by: Ngarikutuke Tjiriange
- Succeeded by: Nangolo Mbumba

Minister of Justice
- In office 2005 – 4 December 2012
- President: Hifikepunye Pohamba
- Preceded by: Albert Kawana
- Succeeded by: Utoni Nujoma

Attorney general
- In office 2001–2008
- President: Sam Nujoma; Hifikepunye Pohamba
- Preceded by: Ngarikutuke Tjiriange
- Succeeded by: Albert Kawana

Minister of Lands, Resettlement and Rehabilitation
- In office 1996–2001
- President: Sam Nujoma
- Preceded by: Richard Kapelwa Kabajani
- Succeeded by: Hifikepunye Pohamba

Minister of Youth and Sport
- In office 1991–1996
- President: Sam Nujoma
- Preceded by: Nahas Angula
- Succeeded by: Richard Kapelwa Kabajani

Deputy Minister of Wildlife, Conservation and Tourism
- In office 1990–1991
- President: Sam Nujoma
- Preceded by: position established

Personal details
- Born: 11 October 1952 (age 73) Uukwandongo, Omusati Region, Namibia
- Party: SWAPO
- Education: University of Namibia
- Occupation: Lawyer
- Profession: Politician

Pendukeni "Penny" Iivula-Ithana (born 11 October 1952) is a Namibian politician who served as the secretary general of SWAPO, Namibia's ruling party, from 2007 to 2012. She was a member of the Constituent Assembly of Namibia in 1989 and has been a member of Parliament and a member of the cabinet since independence in 1990.

Iivula-Ithana served in several ministerial positions over three decades. Her last ministerial post was in the interior ministry. After criticising the sitting president, Hage Geingob, and other senior political leaders in November 2017, she was dismissed from the cabinet. She also lost her parliamentary seat at the end of the 2015–2020 legislative period.

== Early life, education, and exile ==
Iivula-Ithana was born on 11 October 1952 in Uukwandongo, Ongandjera, Ovamboland. In 1974, she went into exile and became one of the first women fighters in the People's Liberation Army of Namibia (PLAN). She was active in the SWAPO Youth League and the SWAPO Women's Council, whose Secretary she became in 1980.

Iivula-Ithana holds a Bachelor of Laws and B.Juris degrees from the University of Namibia (1999 and 1998), and a Diploma in Public Administration and Management from the United Nations Institute for Namibia in Zambia (1979). Ithana also holds an MBA from the Namibia International University of Management.

== Political career ==
Immediately before Namibian independence, she was a SWAPO delegate to the Constituent Assembly, which was in place from November 1989 to March 1990 and upon independence in March 1990, she became a member of the National Assembly of Namibia.

Iivula-Ithana served in several cabinet positions. She was Deputy Minister of Wildlife, Conservation and Tourism from 1990 to 1991, Minister of Youth and Sport from 1991 to 1996, and Minister of Lands, Resettlement and Rehabilitation from 1996 to 2001. She was moved from the latter position to that of attorney general on January 26, 2001. In March 2005, when President Hifikepunye Pohamba took office, she was appointed to the additional post of Minister of Justice.

At SWAPO's August 2002 congress, Iivula-Ithana placed 23rd in the election for the Central Committee, receiving 310 votes. She was elected as secretary general of SWAPO at the party's November 2007 congress, becoming the first woman to hold that position.

Iivula-Ithana was one possible contender for SWAPO's presidential candidacy, a position determined at the end of the 2012 party congress. She lost to Hage Geingob and runner-up Jerry Ekandjo, coming third by a margin. This fifth SWAPO congress was followed by a cabinet reshuffle on 4 December 2012, in which she became Minister of Home Affairs.

In late August 2014, when SWAPO chose its list of parliamentary candidates for the November 2014 general election, Iivula-Ithana only managed to obtain the 86th spot on the list, a poor performance that made it seem unlikely that she would be elected to the National Assembly. Although she failed to make it into parliament in the election, she was subsequently chosen by President Hage Geingob as one of his eight presidential appointees to the National Assembly. When Geingob took office in March 2015, Iivula-Ithana was retained in her post as Minister of Home Affairs.

For the 2017 SWAPO electoral congress, Iivula-Ithana campaigned against President Geingob, calling the leadership of the government and ruling party "weak". She was dismissed from her minister position on 1 February 2018, along with fellow critic and minister Jerry Ekandjo. She also lost her positions on SWAPO's central committee and politburo, commenting in 2022:

"The congress of 2017 stripped me of every accolade I have earned in SWAPO and position in the government, and that was not pleasant."

Frans Kapofi succeeded her as Minister of Home Affairs.

== Controversies ==
When Iivula-Ithana became secretary general of SWAPO, it was also decided that this post would become a full-time salaried position. It was consequently expected that she would leave her posts of justice minister and attorney general at the time of the next cabinet reshuffle. However, she remained in all three posts. It was reported that there were internal disagreements in the SWAPO Party regarding the issue of Iivula-Ithana's multiple jobs, with President Pohamba wanting to remove Iivula-Ithana from her cabinet posts while former President Sam Nujoma's supporters wanted her to retain all posts and opposed implementing the resolution.

During her term as Justice Minister, Iivula-Ithana clashed with the Namibian Magistrates Commission over the dismissal of a magistrate. The Magistrates Commission successfully sued her, and the case is currently being appealed by her in the Supreme Court of Namibia.

== Awards and recognition ==
A school in the Omusati Region of northern Namibia, formerly part of Onamhidi Combined School, is named Pendukeni Iivula-Ithana High School after her. The primary section of Onamhidi Combined was also named after her, but was renamed Bernard Haufiku Primary School in 2021 to resolve the name duplication.
