= Netumbo Nandi-Ndaitwah =

President of Namibia since 2025

Her Excellency Netumbo Nandi-Ndaitwah
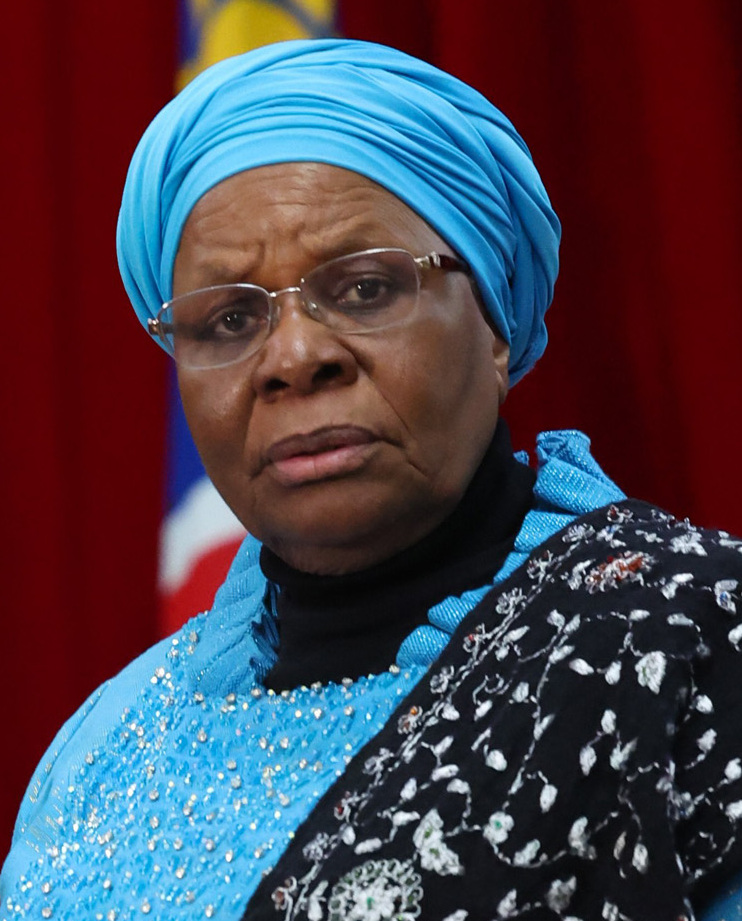
- Nandi-Ndaitwah in 2025

5th President of Namibia
- Incumbent
- Assumed office 21 March 2025
- Prime Minister: Elijah Ngurare
- Vice President: Lucia Witbooi
- Preceded by: Nangolo Mbumba

3rd Vice President of Namibia
- In office 4 February 2024 – 21 March 2025
- President: Nangolo Mbumba
- Preceded by: Nangolo Mbumba
- Succeeded by: Lucia Witbooi

Deputy Prime Minister of Namibia
- In office 21 March 2015 – 4 February 2024
- Prime Minister: Saara Kuugongelwa
- Preceded by: Marco Hausiku
- Succeeded by: John Mutorwa

Minister of International Relations and Cooperation
- In office 4 December 2012 – 4 February 2024
- Prime Minister: Hage Geingob; Saara Kuugongelwa
- Preceded by: Utoni Nujoma
- Succeeded by: Peya Mushelenga

Minister of Environment and Tourism
- In office 21 March 2010 – 4 December 2012
- Prime Minister: Nahas Angula
- Preceded by: Willem Konjore
- Succeeded by: Uahekua Herunga

Minister of Information and Broadcasting
- In office 2005–2010
- Prime Minister: Nahas Angula
- Preceded by: Nangolo Mbumba
- Succeeded by: Joel Kaapanda

Minister of Women Affairs and Child Welfare
- In office 2000–2005
- Prime Minister: Hage Geingob
- Preceded by: Position established
- Succeeded by: Marlene Mungunda

Personal details
- Born: Netumbo Nandi; 29 October 1952 (age 74) Onamutai, South West Africa (now Namibia)
- Party: SWAPO
- Spouse: Epaphras Denga Ndaitwah
- Education: Keele University; Glasgow Caledonian University

Ndemupelila Netumbo Nandi-Ndaitwah (née Nandi; born 29 October 1952), nicknamed NNN, is a Namibian politician who is the fifth and current president of Namibia since 21 March 2025. She is the country's first female president. Previously, she served as the third vice president under President Nangolo Mbumba between 2024 and 2025. She held various high level political and ministerial position as well as various responsibility within the SWAPO party and its government over an uninterrupted period of 57 years.

She was the first female presidential candidate for SWAPO (the South West Africa People's Organisation) in 2024. In 2017, Nandi-Ndaitwah was elected vice president of SWAPO, the first woman to serve in that position. Before entering the top leading position, Nandi-Ndaitwah served as the deputy prime minister of Namibia from 2015 to 2024, minister of International Relations and Cooperation from December 2012 to 2015, and as minister of Environment and Tourism from March 2010 to December 2012. She is a long-time member of the National Assembly.

== Early life and education ==
Netumbo Nandi was born on 29 October 1952 to Justina Nekoto Shaduka-Nandi and Petrus Nandi in Onamutai, South West Africa, today near the border of Ohangwena Region and Oshana Region, Namibia. Her father was an Anglican clergyman. She is the ninth of 13 children. Ndaitwah was educated at St. Mary's Mission in Odibo.

Nandi-Ndaitwah became politically active as a teenager, joining SWAPO's ranks at the age of 14. She soon became the leader of SWAPO's Youth Movement organisation, fighting to end South Africa's occupation. Nandi-Ndaitwah soon became a target for the opposition, forcing her to go into hiding.

Nandi-Ndaitwah went into exile in 1973 and joined SWAPO members in Zambia. She worked at the SWAPO headquarters in Lusaka from 1973 to 1975 and attended a course at the Lenin Higher Komsomol School in the Soviet Union from 1975 until 1976. She graduated with a diploma in the work and practice of the communist youth movement. In 1987, she obtained a post-graduate diploma in public administration and management from the Glasgow College of Technology, in the United Kingdom, and 1988, a further post-graduate diploma in international relations from Keele University, also in the UK. In 1989, Nandi-Ndaitwah obtained a master's degree in diplomatic studies, also from Keele University.

After the 2024 November election, she was given an honorary Doctorate in diplomatic and public work by the University of Dar es Salaam.

== Political career ==
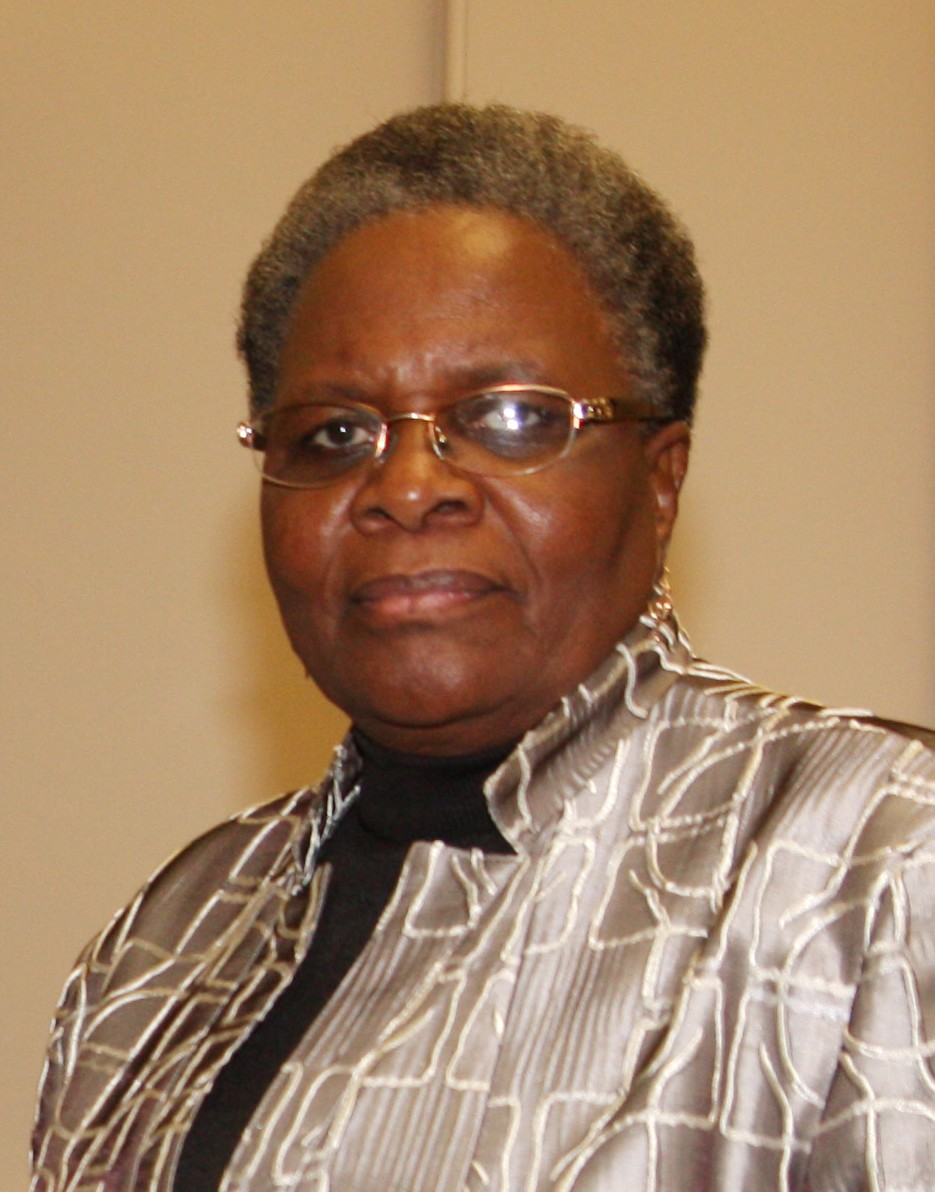
Netumbo Nandi-Ndaitwah in 2015

Nandi-Ndaitwah became the SWAPO deputy representative in Zambia from 1976 until 1978 and the chief representative in Zambia from 1978 to 1980. From 1980 until 1986, she was the SWAPO chief representative in East Africa, based at Dar es Salaam. She was a member of the SWAPO central committee from 1976 to 1986 and the Namibian National Women's Organisation (NANAWO) president from 1991 to 1994.

She has been a member of the National Assembly of Namibia since 1990. She was Deputy Minister of International Relations and Cooperation from 1990 to 1996 and first gained ministerial status in 1996 as director-general of Women's Affairs in the Office of the President, where she served until 2000, under Namibia's first president, Sam Nujoma. In this role, Nandi-Ndaitwah worked in the department to coordinate between the government, private, and public spheres on advancing government programs to support women and children. During this time, Namibia's National Gender Policy (1997) was enacted. Other gender responsive laws such as the Married Persons Equality Act (1996) and the Combating of Rape Act (2000), recognizing marital rape, were enacted to improve gender equality and reduce gender-based violence. In 2000, she was promoted to Minister and given the Women's Affairs and Child Welfare portfolio. In 2003, the Domestic Violence Act (2003) was passed with her support to protect children and spouses from violence occurring in the home. In 2022, an amendment was published to extend safeguards to children in the home beyond their 18th birthday.

From 2005 to 2010, she was the Minister of Information and Broadcasting in Namibia's cabinet. She subsequently served as the minister of environment and tourism until a major cabinet reshuffle in December 2012, in which she was appointed minister of foreign affairs, a portfolio since renamed to International Relations and Cooperation.

Under President Hage Geingob, Nandi-Ndaitwah was appointed as deputy prime minister in March 2015, while serving in parallel as the minister of international relations and cooperation. Nandi-Ndaitwah sits on both SWAPO's central committee and the Politburo. She is also the party's secretary for information and mobilisation and, as such, is one of SWAPO's main spokespeople.

=== Presidency ===
Nandi-Ndaitwah with Russian President Vladimir Putin at the Third Russia–Africa Summit in Moscow, 29 October 2026

In March 2023, President Geingob named Nandi-Ndaitwah as SWAPO's presidential candidate in the 2024 Namibian general election. Following Geingob's death in February 2024, Nandi-Ndaitwah was appointed as vice president, succeeding Nangolo Mbumba, who became president. She is the first woman serving in that role.

On 3 December 2024, she was officially declared the president-elect of the Republic of Namibia, making her the first woman to hold the position. Nandi-Ndaitwah received 683,560, or 58.7% of the vote, defeating Panduleni Itula and McHenry Venaani. She was inaugurated on 21 March 2025.

During her inauguration speech in 2025, she pledged to focus on job creation, specifically targeting "500,000 new jobs" as a policy priority, with a key focus on agriculture, fishing, creative, and sports industries.

In April 2025, Nandi-Ndaitwah announced that the government would provide free tertiary education in government schools beginning in 2026. On 27 April, she dismissed Mac-Albert Hengari as Minister of Agriculture, Fisheries, Water and Land Reform following his arrest on bribery charges, after he tried to silence an alleged rape victim.

== Personal life ==
Netumbo Nandi-Ndaitwah is married to Lieutenant General (retired) Epaphras Denga Ndaitwah, former Chief of the Namibian Defence Force. She is interested in children's community work and reading.

She is popularly referred to as NNN, a nickname used commonly by her political associates.

She is an advocate for women and gender equality in Namibia. Despite work on gender equality in Namibia, many of her critics consider her beliefs to be in opposition to feminism, as she has a more traditional, conservative viewpoint. In a 2022 interview between EagleFM and political analyst Henning Melber, Melber stated that she has not historically supported reproductive rights or protections for LGBTQIA+ individuals. She is also an opponent of abortion.

Nandi-Ndaitwah speaks to Voice of America to urge American entrepreneurs to develop business activities and products in Namibia.

== Awards ==
Netumbo Nandi-Ndaitwah is a recipient of the African Leadership Magazine (ALM) African Political Leader of the Year and African Female Leader of the Year Award was awarded the 'thought leadership' at the Namibia Sustainable Development Awards. Nandi-Ndaitwah was recognized with an Inter-Generational Leadership Award at the 2024 Nala Feminist (Nalafem) Summit. She further holds an Honorary Doctorate from the University of Dar es Salaam, Tanzania.

She has also been honored by the President of the Namibia National Women’s Organization (NANAWO) for her work on improving women's role in politics.

== Gallery ==
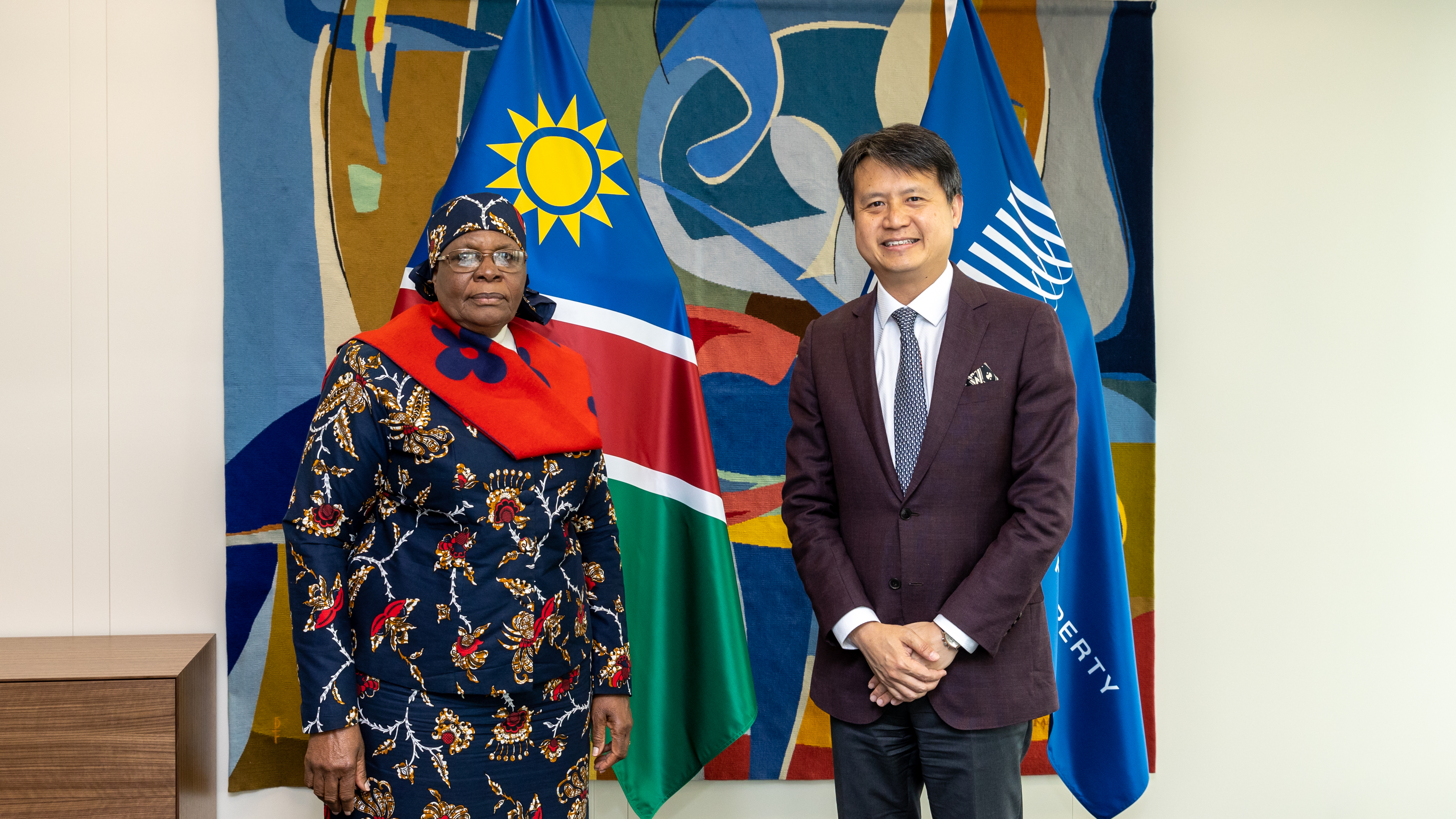
Nandi-Ndaitwah meeting with WIPO Director General Daren Tang in 2022. The two discussed IP's role in helping drive economic, youth music industry, women innovators, and social development under the "Namibia Vision 2030" plan.

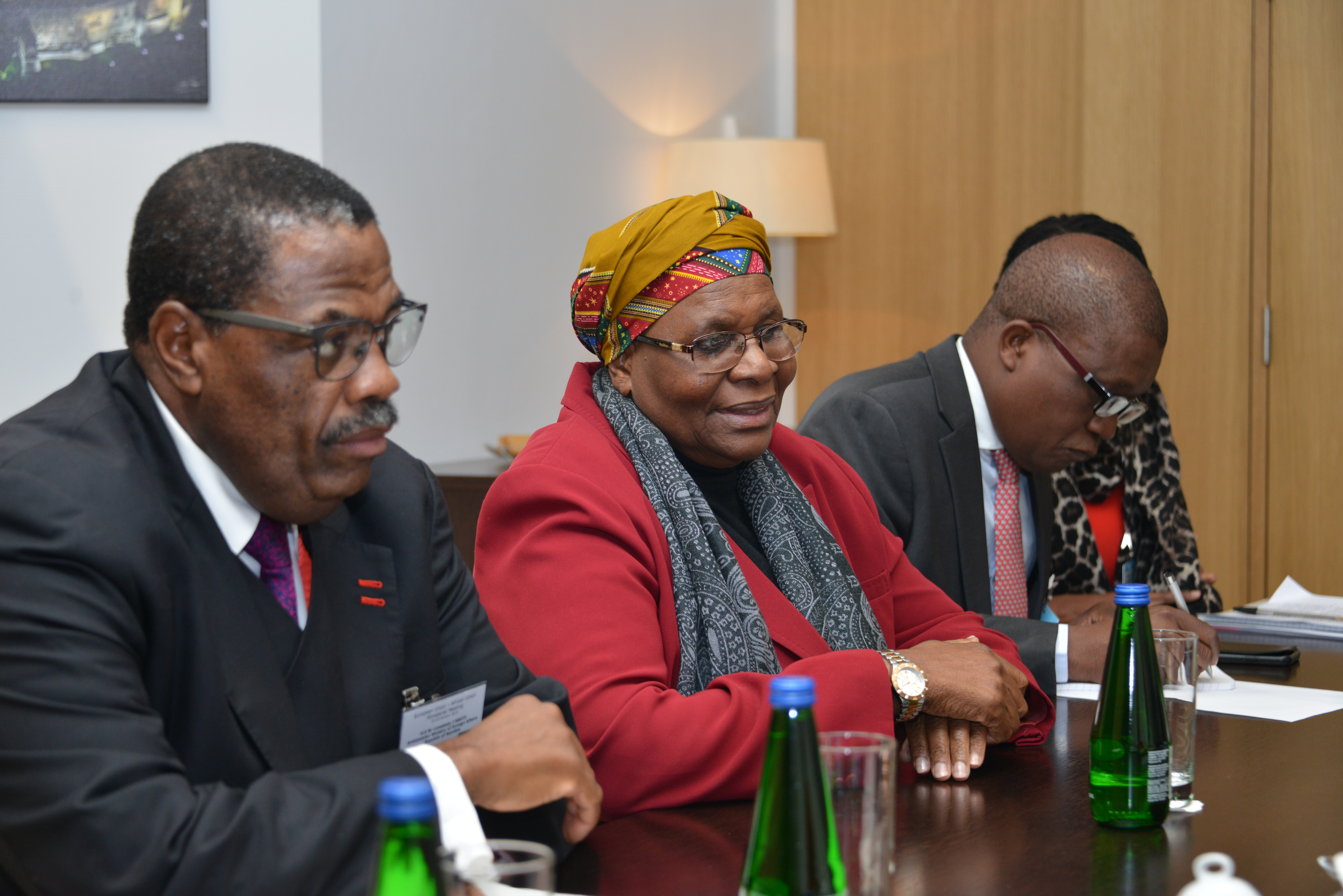
Meeting with the Estonian foreign ministry, 2019.

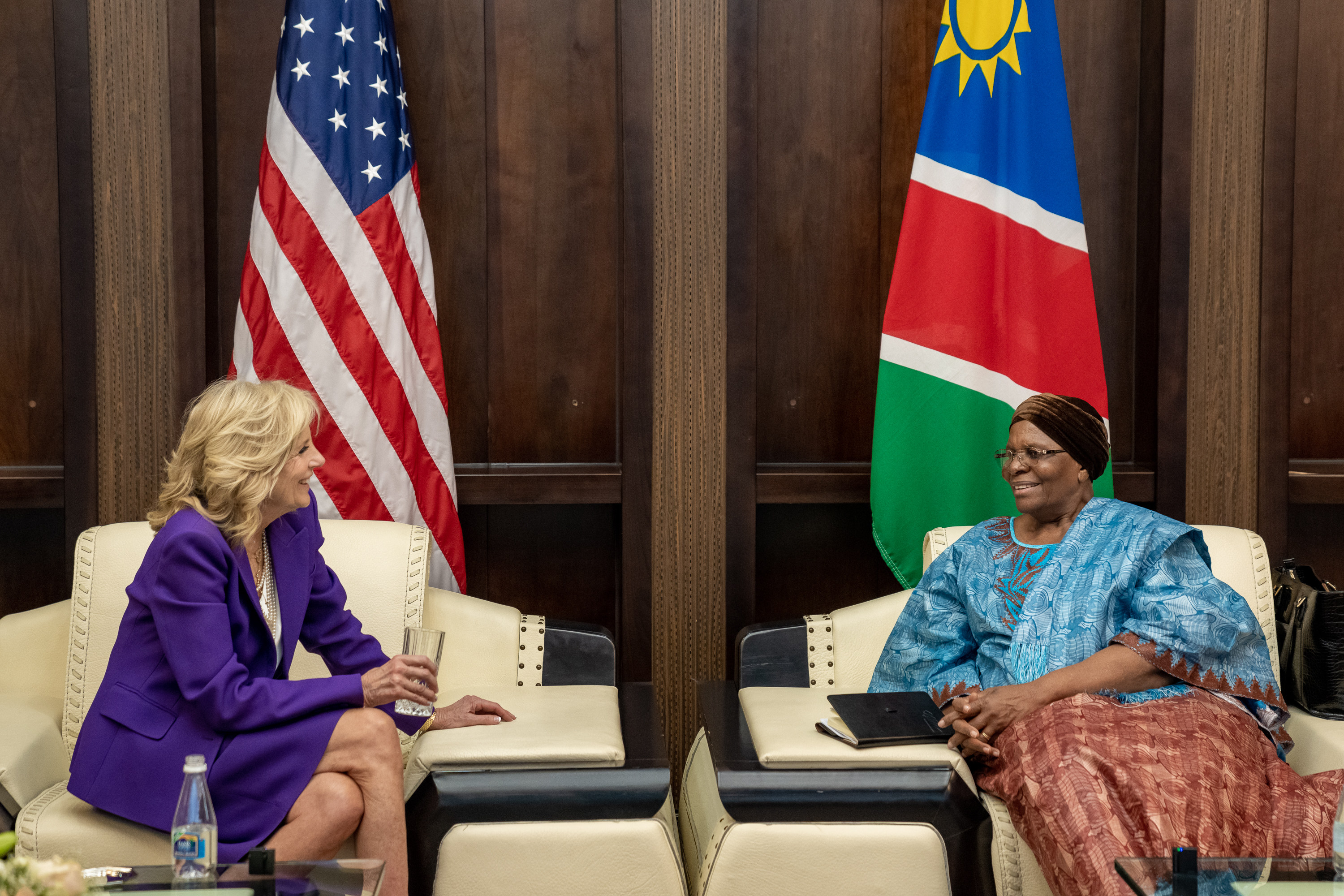
Nandi-Ndaitwah meets with First Lady Jill Biden in 2023, at the State House in Windhoek, Namibia.

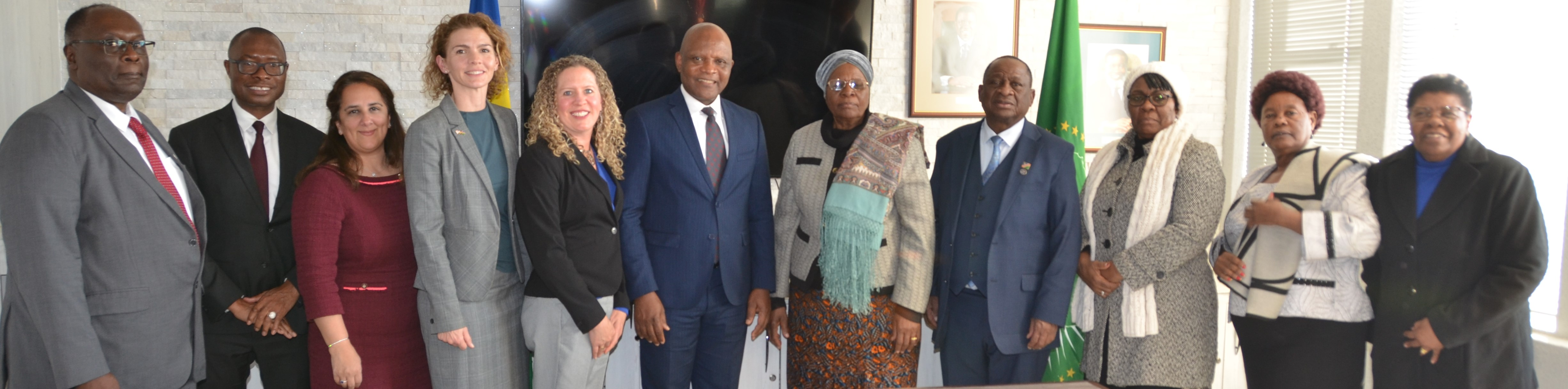
Nandi-Ndaitwah (center right) among the Namibian cabinet meeting with representatives from USAID (including Iipumbu Shiimi), and PEPFAR representatives. Other Namibian cabinet members pictured include Kalumbi Shangula, Anna Nghipondoka, Doreen Sioka, and Agnes Tjongarero.
