= Government of Namibia =

Highest executive authority in Namibia

The government of Namibia consists of the executive, the legislative and the judiciary branches. The Cabinet is the executive organ of government, implementing the laws of the country. It consists of the president, the prime minister and his deputy, as well as the ministers of the Cabinet of Namibia. The legislative organs of government are the National Council and the National Assembly. They make the laws of the country. The judiciary organs of government are the courts. The highest court of Namibia is the Supreme Court. There are also the high courts and lower courts.

The Namibian government is partly centralised and partly regional. In the executive branch, central government consists of ministries, offices and agencies, whereas regional government consists of regional councils, and constituencies within these. The legislation is centralised in the lower house (National Assembly), and regional in the upper house (National Council). The judiciary is centralised in the Supreme Court, whereas high courts and lower courts are distributed all over the country.

== Executive branch of government ==
The central executive branch of government consists of offices, ministries, and agencies. The offices of central government are:

1. Office of the President (OP)
2. Office of the Prime Minister (OPM)
3. Office of the Judiciary (OJ)

As of 2025 there are 14 stand-alone ministries in Namibia, down from 19 in 2020.

1. Ministry of Agriculture, Water and Land Reform (MAWLR)
2. Ministry of Defence and Veteran Affairs (MoDVA)
3. Ministry of Education, Innovation, Youth, Sport, Arts and Culture (MoE)
  - Namibia Student Financial Assistance Fund (NSFAF)
  - National Library and Archives service (NLAS)
  - Namibia Sports Commission
4. Ministry of Environment and Tourism (MET)
5. Ministry of Finance and Social Grants Management (MoF)
6. Ministry of Gender Equality and Child Welfare (MGECW)
7. Ministry of Health and Social Services (MHSS)
8. Ministry of Home Affairs, Immigration, Safety and Security (MHAISS)
  - Namibian Police Force
  - Namibian Correctional Services
9. Ministry of International Relations and Trade (MIRT)
10. Ministry of Information and Communication Technology (MICT)
  - Communications Regulatory Authority of Namibia (CRAN)
11. Ministry of Justice and Labour Relations (MoJ)
12. Ministry of Mines, Energy and Industry (MEI)
13. Ministry of Works and Transport (MoW)
  - Namibia Civil Aviation Authority (NCAA)
  - Directorate of Aircraft Accident Investigations (DAAI)
14. Ministry of Urban and Rural Development (MURD)

The agencies of the central government are:

- Anti-Corruption Commission (ACC)
- Electoral Commission (EC)
- Central Intelligence Service (NCIS)
- National Planning Commission (NPC)
  - Namibia Statistics Agency (NSA)
- Office of the Attorney General (OAG)
- Office of the Auditor-General (OAG)
- Office of the Ombudsman
- Public Service Commission of Namibia (PSC)

== Government organisations and state-owned enterprises ==
The Namibian state runs and owns a number of companies such as Transnamib and NamPost, most of which need frequent financial assistance to stay afloat.

There is a number of agencies and authorities established by acts of Parliament that can be considered government organisations:

- Council of Traditional Leaders
- Development Bank of Namibia
- Law Reform and Development Commission (LRDC), responsible for researching recommended law changes to the Ministry of Justice.
- Namibia Qualifications Authority (NQA). This institution evaluates and accredits national institutions and degrees, as well as foreign qualifications of people who wish to demonstrate the national equivalence of their degrees earned abroad.
- Namibia Tourism Board (NTB), the regulatory and marketing body for tourism activities in Namibia, and is headquartered in Windhoek, Namibia.

== Traditional leadership ==
Alongside ordinary governance, Namibia also has a parallel system of traditional leadership. Only people of tribes recognised by the state, living in their traditional areas, are subject to this type of government which covers land allocation, traditional marriage, and lower courts. There are 51 recognised traditional authorities and a further 40 pending applications.
