= Nahas Angula =

Third Prime Minister of Namibia

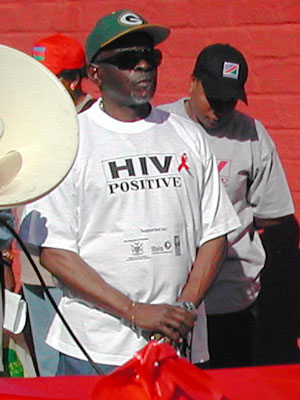
- Angula in 2005

Minister of Defence
- In office 4 December 2012 – 21 March 2015
- President: Hifikepunye Pohamba
- Preceded by: Charles Namoloh
- Succeeded by: Penda Ya Ndakolo

3rd Prime Minister of Namibia
- In office 21 March 2005 – 4 December 2012
- President: Hifikepunye Pohamba
- Deputy: Libertina Amathila; Marco Hausiku
- Preceded by: Theo-Ben Gurirab
- Succeeded by: Hage Geingob

Minister of Higher Education
- In office 21 March 1995 – 21 March 2005
- President: Sam Nujoma
- Preceded by: position established
- Succeeded by: position abolished

Minister of Education, Culture, Youth and Sport
- In office 21 March 1990 – 21 March 1995
- President: Sam Nujoma
- Preceded by: position established
- Succeeded by: John Mutorwa

Personal details
- Born: 22 August 1943 (age 83) Onyaanya Constituency, South-West Africa (now Namibia)
- Party: SWAPO
- Spouse: Katrina Tangeni Namalenga
- Children: 2
- Education: University of Zambia; Columbia University; University of Manchester
- Religion: Lutheranism

Nahas Gideon Angula (born 22 August 1943) is a Namibian politician who served as the third Prime Minister of Namibia from 21 March 2005 to 4 December 2012. He was succeeded by Hage Geingob in a cabinet reshuffle after the 2012 SWAPO Party congress. He subsequently served as Minister of Defence from 2012 to 2015.

Angula is a member of the South West Africa People's Organization (SWAPO). He was Minister of Education, Culture, Youth and Sport from 1990 to 1995 and Minister of Higher Education from 1995 to 2005.

== Political career ==
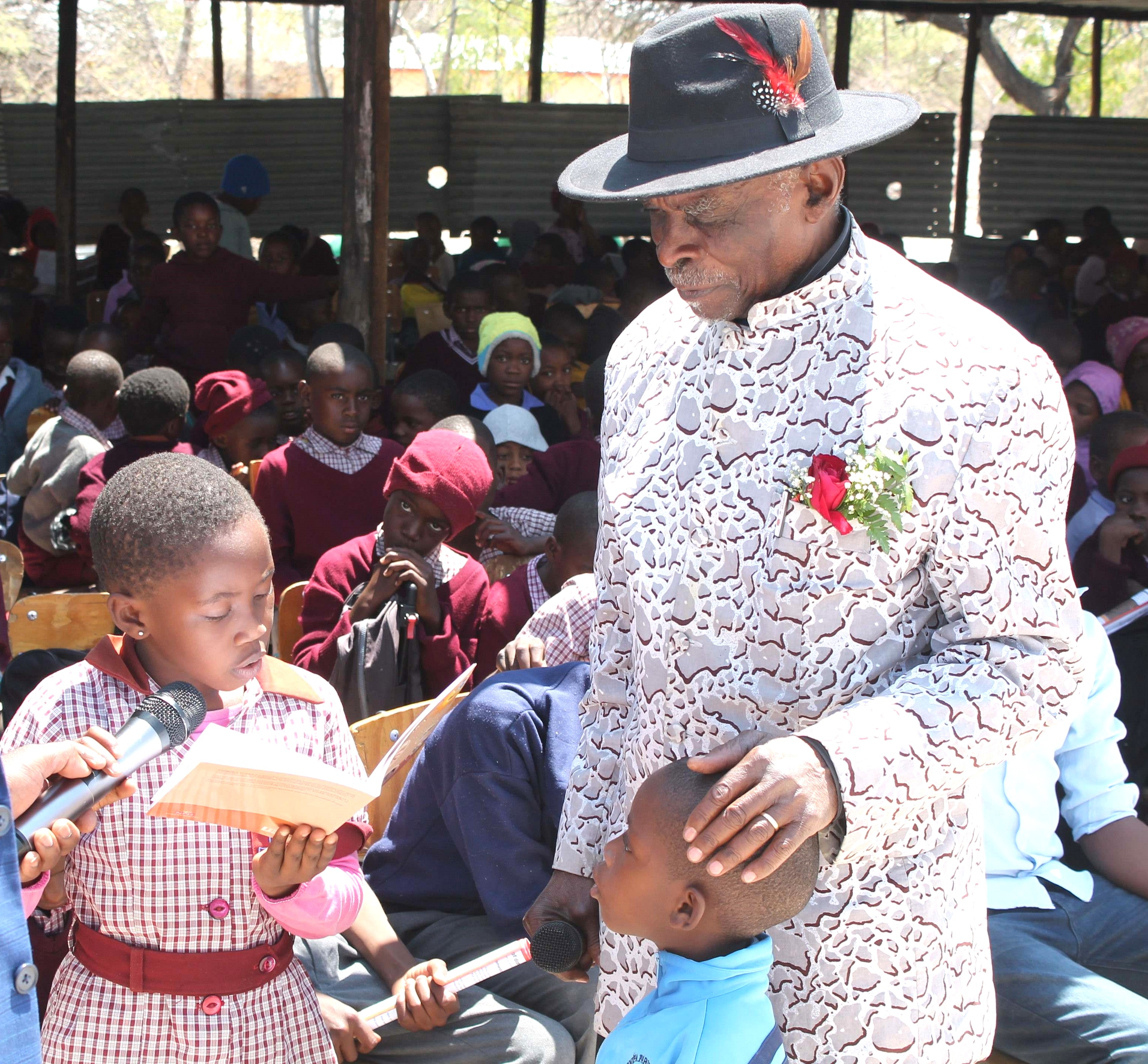
Honorable Nahas Angula conducting a reading session during Readathon Week with school children at Oniipa Primary School in Oshikoto Region, 25 September 2023

Angula was born in Onyaanya, Oshikoto Region. He was in exile from Namibia from 1965 to 1989. During this time, he worked for Radio Zambia from 1973 to 1976 and for the United Nations as a civil servant from 1976 to 1980 before becoming a SWAPO organizer in 1980. He was in charge of SWAPO voter registration in 1989. Immediately before independence, Angula was a SWAPO member of the Constituent Assembly of Namibia, which was in place from November 1989 to March 1990.

Angula became a member of the National Assembly in 1990. He was Minister of Education, Culture, Youth and Sport from 1990 to 1995 and Minister of Higher Education from 1995 to 2005.

Angula received the highest number of votes, 395 (tied with Jerry Ekandjo), in the election to the Central Committee of SWAPO at the party's August 2002 congress. He was one of three candidates who sought SWAPO's nomination as its presidential candidate in May 2004. He placed third in the first round, receiving 137 votes, while Hifikepunye Pohamba received 213 and Hidipo Hamutenya received 166, and he was therefore excluded from the second round. Those who supported Angula backed Pohamba almost without exception in the second round of voting, and Pohamba was victorious.

On March 21, 2005, when Pohamba was sworn in as president of Namibia, he announced that he was appointing Angula as Prime Minister of Namibia.

After Hage Geingob was re-elected as SWAPO vice-president on 2 December 2012, and thus confirmed as SWAPO's 2014 presidential candidate, Pohamba appointed Geingob to replace Angula as prime minister on 4 December 2012. Angula was instead appointed Minister of Defence.

Amidst a push for new faces in the National Assembly, Angula opted not to seek a spot on the SWAPO list for the 2014 election.

== Education and personal life ==
Angula received a master's degree in education from Columbia University in 1978. He never completed his Ph.D. at the Teachers College , as SWAPO instructed him to return to Namibia to become the Minister of Education. He is a member of the Lutheran church, as has been his family for generations.

Political offices
| Preceded by Theo-Ben Gurirab | Prime Minister of Namibia; 2005–2012 | Succeeded by Hage Geingob |
