= Hifikepunye Pohamba =

President of Namibia from 2005 to 2015

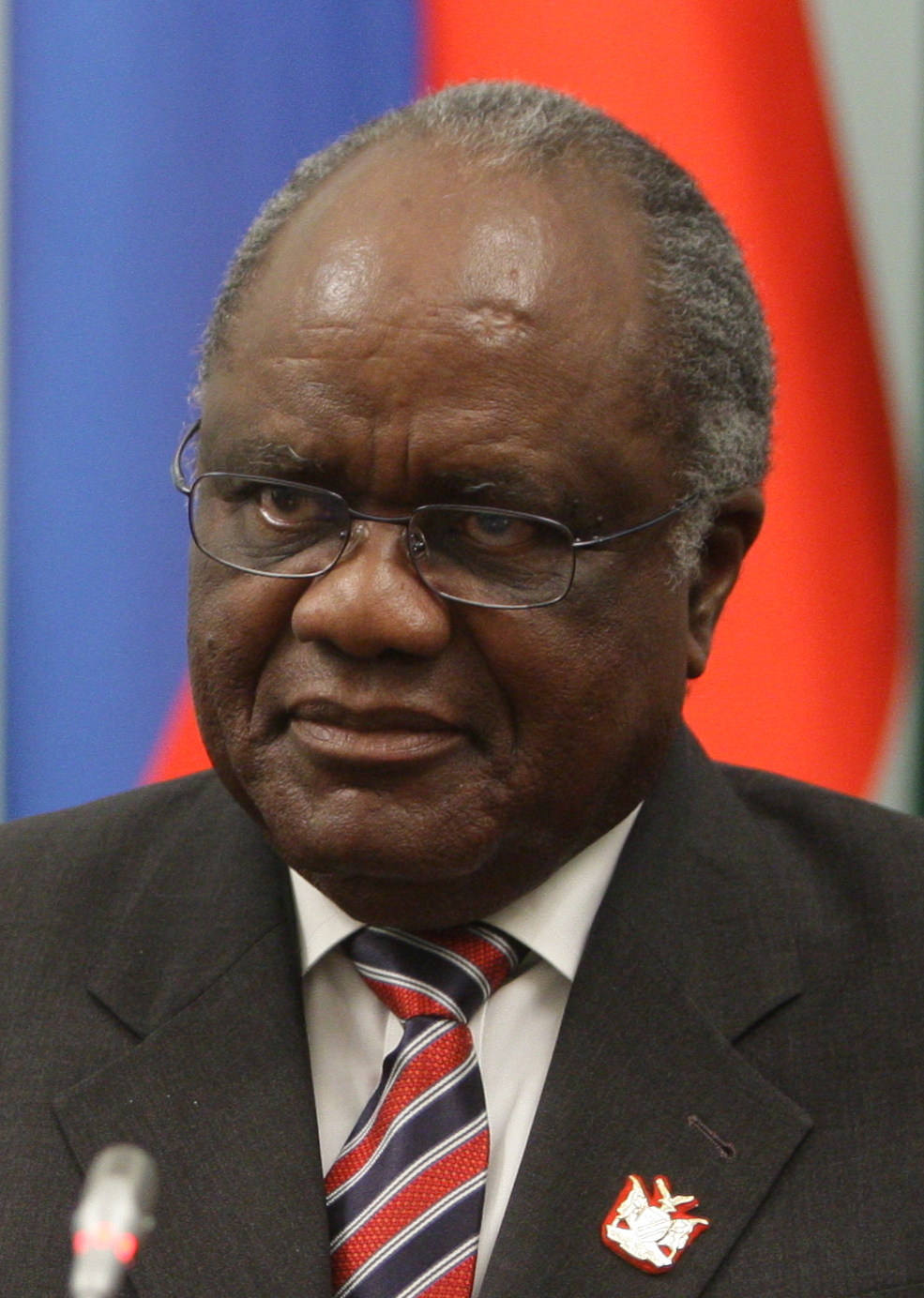
- Pohamba in 2010

2nd President of Namibia
- In office 21 March 2005 – 21 March 2015
- Prime Minister: Nahas Angula (2005–2012); Hage Geingob (2012–2015)
- Preceded by: Sam Nujoma
- Succeeded by: Hage Geingob

President of SWAPO
- In office 29 November 2007 – 19 April 2015
- Preceded by: Sam Nujoma
- Succeeded by: Hage Geingob

Minister of Lands, Resettlement and Rehabilitation
- In office 2001–2005
- President: Sam Nujoma
- Preceded by: Pendukeni Iivula-Ithana
- Succeeded by: Jerry Ekandjo

Minister without portfolio
- In office 1997–2000
- President: Sam Nujoma

Minister of Fisheries and Marine Resources
- In office 1995–1997
- President: Sam Nujoma
- Preceded by: Helmut Angula
- Succeeded by: Abraham Iyambo

Minister of Home Affairs
- In office 1990–1995
- Preceded by: position established
- Succeeded by: Jerry Ekandjo

Personal details
- Born: Hifikepunye Lucas Pohamba; 18 August 1935 (age 91) Okanghudi, Ovamboland, South West Africa (now Namibia)
- Party: SWAPO
- Spouse: Penehupifo Pohamba (m. 1983; died 2026)
- Children: 5 (Note: including two stepchildren)
- Education: Peoples' Friendship University of Russia
- Occupation: Politician
- Religion: Anglicanism

Hifikepunye Lucas Pohamba (born 18 August 1935) is a Namibian politician who served as the second president of Namibia from 21 March 2005 to 21 March 2015. He won the 2004 presidential election overwhelmingly as the candidate of SWAPO and was reelected in 2009. Pohamba was the president of SWAPO from 2007 until his retirement in 2015. He is a recipient of the Ibrahim Prize.

Before his presidency, Pohamba served in various ministerial positions, beginning with Namibia's independence in 1990. He was Minister of Home Affairs from 1990 to 1995, Minister of Fisheries and Marine Resources from 1995 to 1997, Minister without portfolio from 1997 to 2000, and Minister of Lands, Resettlement and Rehabilitation from 2001 to 2005. He was also secretary-general of SWAPO from 1997 to 2002 and vice-president of SWAPO from 2002 to 2007.

== Early life ==
Hifikepunye Pohamba was born on 18 August 1935 in Okanghudi, then part of South West Africa, in an area then known as Ovamboland (today in the Ohangwena Region of Namibia). He completed his primary school education in the Anglican Holy Cross Mission school in Onamunhama, and in 1956 took up work at the Tsumeb mine.

== Political career ==
=== Under South African occupation ===
Pohamba was active in the Ovamboland People's Organization. When this national liberation movement transformed into SWAPO in 1960, Pohamba was a founding member of the organization's new incarnation and left his job in the mine to work as a full-time organizer for the group.

In 1961 Pohamba went into exile. He traveled to Dar es Salaam to the newly-independent Tanganyika (today part of Tanzania) where he met Sam Nujoma, later Namibia's first president, for the first time. It was resolved that he should join a group of SWAPO members returning home and mobilizing people there. On his way he was arrested in Rhodesia (today Zimbabwe) and was jailed in Bulawayo, then deported to Johannesburg. He spent six months in jail there and was then put under house arrest in Ovamboland.

In 1964 Pohamba again left Namibia. He went to Lusaka to set up SWAPO's Zambian office. He returned to Namibia in 1966 with Sam Nujoma, claiming that SWAPO leaders were not banned from traveling. They were nevertheless deported to Zambia a day after their arrival. Pohamba moved to Dar es Salaam again.

In 1971 SWAPO transferred Pohamba to Algeria; He became the movement's chief representative for northern Africa. In 1979 he became the party's chief of operations in Lusaka. From 1981 to 1982 he studied politics in the Soviet Union, and upon his return to Africa, he moved to Luanda, Angola, where SWAPO's headquarters was at that time.

=== After independence of Namibia ===
Pohamba headed SWAPO's 1989 election campaign and was a SWAPO member of the Constituent Assembly, which was in place from November 1989 to March 1990, before becoming a member of the National Assembly at independence in March 1990. He was Minister of Home Affairs from March 1990 to 1995, Minister of Fisheries and Marine Resources from 1995 to 1997, and Minister without portfolio from 1997 to March 2000. He was elected as secretary-general of SWAPO in 1997 and as its vice-president in 2002. On 26 January 2001, he was appointed as Minister of Lands, Resettlement and Rehabilitation in addition to his above ministerial position, in which position he remained until becoming president in 2005.

Under Pohamba's leadership as Minister of Lands, Resettlement, and Rehabilitation, Namibia initiated a policy of partial land expropriation from landed white farmers to landless black ones. This policy was introduced to supplement the existing one of "willing buyer-willing seller" to try speed up the process.

After becoming president, Pohamba also took over the chancellorship of the University of Namibia from Nujoma in November 2011.

=== Presidency ===
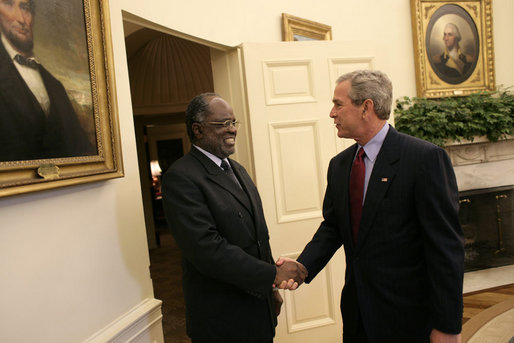
Pohamba with United States President George W. Bush in June 2005.

Pohamba was selected as SWAPO's candidate for the 2004 presidential election at an extraordinary party congress held in May 2004. He received 213 votes out of 526 in the first round of voting; in the second round, held on 30 May, he won with 341 votes against 167 for Hidipo Hamutenya, having received the support of nearly all of those who had backed third-place candidate Nahas Angula in the first round. In the presidential election, held on 15/16 November 2004, Pohamba won with 76.44% of the vote, in what has been described as a "landslide", but also denounced as flawed by the opposition. He was backed by Nujoma, who was then serving his third five-year term; Pohamba has been described as Nujoma's hand-picked successor. Pohamba took office as president on 21 March 2005 and has since distinguished himself by careful but decisive moves against corruption. Although there was speculation that Nujoma would seek re-election as SWAPO President in 2007 and then run for President of Namibia again in 2009, he denied these rumors in early October 2007, saying that he intended to step down as party leader in favor of Pohamba. On 29 November 2007, Pohamba was elected as SWAPO President at a party congress; he was the only candidate to be nominated and no voting was deemed necessary. Nujoma said that he was "passing the torch and mantle of leadership to comrade Pohamba". The congress also chose Pohamba as the party's only candidate for the 2009 presidential election.

Pohamba with Manmohan Singh in August 2009.

Pohamba won a second term in the November 2009 presidential election, receiving 611,241 total votes (76.42%). The second-place candidate, Hidipo Hamutenya (who had left SWAPO and gone into opposition), received 88,640 (11.08%).

Pohamba was unable to stand for re-election in 2014 due to constitutional term limits. The election was again won overwhelmingly by SWAPO, and Pohamba was succeeded by Hage Geingob on 21 March 2015. Less than a month later, on 19 April 2015, he retired as president of SWAPO.

Pohamba ended his term with high approval ratings, being hailed for pushing for gender equality and increased spending on housing and education.

== Personal life ==
Pohamba was married to Penehupifo in 1983. The couple owns farm Guinaspoh #41 near Otavi. Penehupifo died on 17 October 2026 at Lady Pohamba Private Hospital, a private hospital named after her.

== Honors ==
=== Foreign honours ===
- Liberia:
  - Grand Cordon of the Order of the Pioneers of Liberia (29 July 2009)
- North Korea:
  - First Class of the Order of Friendship (20 March 2008)

=== Awards ===
- Pohamba is a recipient of the Omugulugwombashe Medal for Bravery and Long Service.
- In 2011, he was awarded a Doctorate of Philosophy honoris causa by the University of Namibia.
- In 2015, he was awarded the 2014 Mo Ibrahim Prize for Achievement in African Leadership of $5 million by the Mo Ibrahim Foundation.
- On 29 April 2016, he was awarded a Doctorate honoris causa by the University for Development Studies, Tamale, Ghana

== See also ==
- List of heads of the executive by approval rating

== Notes ==
Political offices
New office	Minister of Home Affairs; 1990–1995	Succeeded by Jerry Ekandjo
Preceded by Helmut Angula	Minister of Fisheries and Marine Resources; 1995–1997	Succeeded by Abraham Iyambo
Preceded by Pendukeni Iivula-Ithana	Minister of Lands, Resettlement and Rehabilitation; 2001–2005	Succeeded by Jerry Ekandjo
Preceded by Sam Nujoma	President of Namibia; 2005–2015	Succeeded by Hage Geingob
Party political offices
Preceded by Sam Nujoma	President of SWAPO; 2007–2015	Succeeded by Hage Geingob
Preceded by Sam Nujoma	SWAPO nominee for President of Namibia; 2004, 2009	Succeeded by Hage Geingob
