= List of members of the 6th National Assembly of Namibia =

6th National Assembly of Namibia

Type
- Type: Bicameral

History
- Founded: 2015

Structure
- Seats: 104
- Political groups: LPM (4) NEFF (2) SWANU (1) SWAPO (63) UDF (2) CDV (1) RDP(1) APP (2) PDM (16) RP (2) Appointed (8)

Below is a list of members of the 6th National Assembly of Namibia. They were selected by their parties based on the results of the 2014 parliamentary election. The members were in the National Assembly from 21 March 2015 until 21 March 2020. Members were chosen by their parties. Parties were voted in via proportional representation.

This National Assembly was inaugurated on 20 March 2015. Like each of the previous National Assemblies, it was led by the South West Africa People's Organization. The 6th National Assembly had 104 seats, up from 72 seats in all previous assemblies. 96 candidates were elected according to party lists. President Hage Geingob appointed eight additional members after taking office. The seat distribution for the voting members was as follows:

- South West Africa People's Organization (SWAPO): 77
- Democratic Turnhalle Alliance (DTA): 5
- Rally for Democracy and Progress (RDP): 3
- All People's Party (APP): 2
- United Democratic Front (UDF): 2
- National Unity Democratic Organisation (NUDO): 2
- Workers Revolutionary Party (WRP): 2
- South West Africa National Union (SWANU): 1
- United People's Movement (UPM): 1
- Republican Party (RP): 1

== Elected members ==
The following people were voting members of the 6th National Assembly, elected in the 2014 parliamentary election:

=== South West Africa People's Organization ===
- Nangolo Mbumba
- Laura McLeod
- Pohamba Shifeta
- Agnes Kafula
- Sebastian Karupu (resigned in late 2019)
- Lucia Iipumbu
- Bernard Esau (until 3 December 2019)
- Priscilla Beukes
- Tjekero Tweya
- Lucia Witbooi
- Charles Namoloh
- Netumbo Nandi-Ndaitwah
- Veikko Nekundi
- Johanna Kandjimi
- John Mutorwa
- Alexia Manombe-Ncube
- Alpheus ǃNaruseb
- Doreen Sioka
- Natangwe Ithete
- Sophia Shaningwa
- Tom Alweendo
- Juliet Kavetuna
- Calle Schlettwein
- Christine ǁHoebes
- Erastus Uutoni
- Sylvia Makgone
- Engelbrecht !Nawatiseb
- Agnes Tjongarero
- Nickey Iyambo
- Anna Shiweda
- Asser Kapere
- Lidwina Shapwa
- Frans Kapofi
- Liina Namupala
- Peter Katjavivi
- Maureen Hinda-Mbuende
- Piet van der Walt
- Aino Kapewangolo
- Hamunyera Hambyuka
- Saara Kuugongelwa-Amadhila
- Penda Ya Ndakolo
- Bernadette Jagger
- Erkki Nghimtina
- Lucia Nghaamwa
- Sankwasa James Sankwasa
- Kornelia Shilunga
- Sakeus Shanghala (until 3 December 2019)
- Anna Nghipondoka
- Leon Jooste
- Priscilla Kavita
- Stanley Simataa
- Rebecca Iipinge
- Derek Klazen
- Sophia Swartz
- Usko Nghaamwa
- Itah Kandji-Murangi
- Immanuel Ngatjizeko
- Evelyn ǃNawases-Taeyele
- Samuel Ankama
- Becky Ndjoze-Ojo
- Tommy Nambahu
- Annakletha Sikerete
- Royal ǀUiǀoǀoo
- Faustina Caley
- Alpheus Muheua
- Emilia Nuyoma-Amupewa
- Daniel Kashikola
- Margaret Mahoto
- Billy Mwaningange
- Marina Kandumbu
- Utoni Nujoma
- Loide Kasingo
- Peya Mushelenga
- Norah Munsu
- Bernadus Swartbooi
- Ida Hoffman
- Leevi Katoma
- Martha Namundjebo-Tilahun (from 6 January 2020)
- Joel Kaapanda (from 6 January 2020)
- Festus Marenga (from 6 January 2020)
- Ephraim Nekongo (from 6 January 2020)

=== Democratic Turnhalle Alliance (DTA) ===
- McHenry Venaani
- Jennifer Van den Heever
- Vipuakuje Muharukua
- Elma Dienda
- Nico Smit

=== Rally for Democracy and Progress (RDP) ===
- Hidipo Hamutenya
- Steve Bezuidenhout
- Mike Kavekotora

=== All People's Party (APP) ===
- Ignatius Shixwameni
- Reinhold Nauyoma

=== National Unity Democratic Organisation (NUDO) ===
- Asser Mbai
- Meundju Jahanika

=== United Democratic Front (UDF) ===
- Apius ǃAuchab
- Dudu Murorua

=== Workers Revolutionary Party (WRP) ===
The WRP sent their second and third-placed candidate to the National Assembly.

- Benson Kaapala
- Salmon Fleermuys

=== Republic Party (RP) ===
- Henk Mudge

=== South West Africa National Union (SWANU) ===
- Usutuaije Maamberua

=== United People's Movement (UPM) ===
- Jan van Wyk

== Appointed members ==
The following people were non-voting members of the 6th National Assembly, appointed by president Hage Geingob:

- Pendukeni Iivula-Ithana
- Jerry Ekandjo (resigned in late 2019)
- Albert Kawana
- Katrina Hanse-Himarwa
- Zephania Kameeta
- Bernard Haufiku
- Obeth Kandjoze
- Heather Sibungo

National Assembly of Namibia
Preceded by 5th National Assembly	6th National Assembly; 21 March 2015 – 21 March 2020	Succeeded by 7th National Assembly
