= Cabinet of Namibia =

Namibian institution

The Cabinet of Namibia is an appointed body that was established by Chapter 6 (Articles 35-42) of the Constitution of Namibia. It comprises the President of Namibia, the Prime Minister of Namibia and any members that the President may appoint.

All Cabinet members also sit in the National Assembly. This dual membership has been criticised by Namibian civil society groups and opposition parties for creating a significant overlap between executive and legislative branches, undermining the separation of powers. Moreover, the seniority of Cabinet members generally relegates ordinary MPs to the back benches.

== List of Cabinets of Namibia ==
=== Current cabinet (2025-present) ===
The new cabinet was announced on 22 March 2025, following the inauguration of president Netumbo Nandi-Ndaitwah on 21 March 2025. On 2 April 2026, several new positions were announced.

- President: Netumbo Nandi-Ndaitwah
  - Vice President: Lucia Witbooi
- Prime Minister: Elijah Ngurare
  - Deputy Prime Minister: Natangwe Ithete (until 26 October 2025)
- Minister in the Presidency: Charles Mubita (since 2 April 2026)
  - Deputy: Moses ǁKhumub (since 2 April 2026)
- Minister of Agriculture, Fisheries, Water, and Land Reform: Mac Hengari (until 23 April 2025), Inge Zaamwani-Kamwi (since 7 May 2025)
  - Deputy: Ruth Masake
- Attorney General: Festus Mbandeka
- Minister of Defence and Veterans Affairs: Frans Kapofi
  - Deputy: Charles Mubita
- Minister of Education, Innovation, Youth, Sports, Arts and Culture: Sanet Steenkamp
  - Deputy: Dino Ballotti
- Minister of Environment, Forestry and Tourism: Indileni Daniel
  - Deputy: Anselm Marungu (since 2 April 2026)
- Minister of Finance and Social Grants Management: Erica Shafudah
- Minister of Gender Equality and Social Welfare: Emma Kantema-Gaomas
  - Deputy: Linda Mbwale
- Minister of Health and Social Services: Esperance Luvindao
  - Deputy: Hambeleleni Ndjaleka (since 2 April 2026)
- Minister of Home Affairs, Immigration, Safety and Security: Lucia Iipumbu
  - Deputy: Edward Wambo (since 2 April 2026)
- Minister of Industrialization, Mines and Energy: Natangwe Ithete (until 26 October 2026), Frans Kapofi (interim, from 28 October 2025)
  - Deputy: Gaudentia Kröhne
- Minister of Information and Communications Technology: Emma Theofelus
  - Deputy: Wenzel Kavaka (since 2 April 2026)
- Minister of International Relations and Trade: Selma Ashipala-Musavyi
  - Deputy: Jenelly Matundu
- Minister of Justice and Labour Relations: Fillemon Wise Immanuel
  - Deputy: Theresia Brandt (since 2 April 2026)
- Director General of the National Planning Commission: Kaire Mbuende
- Minister of Urban and Rural Development: Sankwasa James Sankwasa
  - Deputy: Evelyn !Nawases-Taeyele
- Minister of Works and Transport: Veikko Nekundi
  - Deputy: Hans Haikali (since 2 April 2026)

=== 2020–2025 ===
This Cabinet was announced on 21 March 2020. Several deputy minister positions have been disestablished as a cost-cutting measure. The Ministry of Agriculture, Water and Forestry has been merged with the Ministry of Land Reform, and the Ministry of Veteran Affairs is now part of Defence. The death of the president in February 2024 necessitated a reshuffle in the top leadership.

- President: Hage Geingob (until 4 February 2024), Nangolo Mbumba
- Vice President: Nangolo Mbumba (until 4 February 2024), Netumbo Nandi-Ndaitwah
- Prime Minister: Saara Kuugongelwa-Amadhila
- Deputy Prime Minister: Netumbo Nandi-Ndaitwah (until 4 February 2024)
- Minister of Presidential Affairs: Christine ǁHoebes
  - Deputy for the recognition of the disabled: Alexia Manombe-Ncube
  - Deputy for the recognition of marginalised people: Royal ǀUiǀoǀoo
- Minister of Agriculture, Water and Land Reform: Calle Schlettwein
  - Deputy: Anna Shiweda
- Attorney General: Festus Mbandeka
- Minister of Defence and Veterans Affairs: Peter Vilho (until April 2021), Frans Kapofi
  - Deputy: Hilma Nicanor
- Minister of Education, Arts and Culture: Anna Nghipondoka
  - Deputy: Faustina Caley
- Minister of Environment, Forestry and Tourism: Pohamba Shifeta
  - Deputy: Heather Sibungo (from April 2021)
- Minister of Finance and Public Enterprises: Iipumbu Shiimi
  - Deputy: Maureen Hinda-Mbuende (from April 2021)
- Minister of Fisheries and Marine Resources: Albert Kawana (until April 2021), Derek Klazen
  - Deputy: Sylvia Makgone
- Minister of Gender Equality, Poverty Eradication and Social Welfare: Doreen Sioka
  - Deputy: Bernadette Jagger
  - Deputy: Lucia Witbooi (until September 2023)
- Minister of Health and Social Services: Kalumbi Shangula
  - Deputy: Esther Muinjangue (NUDO), the only opposition politician in Cabinet
- Minister of Home Affairs, Immigration, Safety and Security: Frans Kapofi (until April 2021), Albert Kawana
  - Deputy: Daniel Kashikola (until September 2023), Lucia Witbooi
- Minister of Higher Education, Training and Innovation: Itah Kandjii-Murangi
  - Deputy: Veno Kauaria (until July 2021), Natalia ǀGoagoses
- Minister of Industrialization and Trade: Lucia Iipumbu
  - Deputy: Verna Sinimbo
- Minister of Information and Communications Technology: Peya Mushelenga until 09 February 2024 Emma Theofelus
  - Deputy: Modestus Amutse
- Minister of International Relations and Cooperation: Netumbo Nandi-Ndaitwah until 09 February 2024 Peya Mushelenga
  - Deputy: Jennely Matundu
- Minister of Justice: Yvonne Dausab
- Minister of Labour, Industrial Relations and Employment Creation: Utoni Nujoma
  - Deputy: Hafeni Ndemula
- Minister of Mines and Energy: Tom Alweendo
  - Deputy: Kornelia Shilunga
- Director General of the National Planning Commission: Obeth Kandjoze
- Minister of Public Enterprises: Leon Jooste (resigned 31 March 2022) (merged with finance ministry on 1 December 2022)
- Minister of Sport, Youth and National Service: Agnes Tjongarero
  - Deputy: Emma Kantema-Gaomas
- Minister of Urban and Rural Development: Erastus Uutoni
  - Deputy: Derek Klazen (until April 2021), Natalia ǀGoagoses (until September 2023), Evelyn !Nawases-Taeyele
- Minister of Works and Transport: John Mutorwa
  - Deputy: Veikko Nekundi

=== 2015–2020 ===
The 6th Cabinet was announced on 19 March 2015. The position of Vice President was established for the first time, and there were five ministries with two deputy ministers each. Their double appointments significantly increased the number of top positions in public administration.

A major Cabinet reshuffle occurred in February 2018 when two ministers were fired, the vice president retired on health grounds, and several other rotations took place. In the wake of the February Cabinet reshuffle the number of deputy ministers was reduced again to one per ministry, with the Office of the Vice-President the only exception. This move was announced as a cost-cutting measure.

- President: Hage Geingob
- Vice President: Nickey Iyambo (until February 2018), Nangolo Mbumba
- Prime Minister: Saara Kuugongelwa-Amadhila
- Deputy Prime Minister and Minister of Foreign Affairs: Netumbo Nandi-Ndaitwah
  - Deputy: Peya Mushelenga (until February 2018), Christine ǁHoebes
  - Deputy: Maureen Hinda-Mbuende (until February 2018)
- Attorney-General: Albert Kawana
- Director General of the National Planning Commission and Minister of Economic Planning: Tom Alweendo (until February 2018), Obeth Kandjoze
  - Deputy: Lucia Iipumbu (until February 2018), Piet van der Walt
- Minister of Agriculture, Water and Forestry: John Mutorwa (until February 2018), Alpheus ǃNaruseb
  - Deputy: Theo Diergaardt
  - Deputy: Anna ShawndaΜ
- Minister of Defence: Penda ya Ndakolo
  - Deputy: Billy Mwaningange
- Minister of Education, Arts and Culture: Katrina Hanse-Himarwa (until July 2019), Martin Andjaba (acting), Anna Nghipondoka (From March 2020)
  - Deputy: Anna Nghipondoka (until February 2020).
- Minister of Environment and Tourism: Pohamba Shifeta
  - Deputy: Tommy Nambahu (until February 2018), Bernadette Jagger
- Minister of Finance: Calle Schlettwein
  - Deputy: Natangwe Ithete
- Minister of Fisheries and Marine Resources: Bernhard Esau (until 13 November 2019), Albert Kawana (acting)
  - Deputy: Chief Samuel Ankama (until February 2018), Sylvia Makgone
- Minister of Gender Equality and Child Welfare: Doreen Sioka
  - Deputy: Lucia Witbooi
- Minister of Health and Social Services: Bernard Haufiku (until December 2018), Kalumbi Shangula
  - Deputy: Juliet Kavetuna
- Minister of Higher Education, Training and Innovation: Itah Kandjii-Murangi
  - Deputy: Becky Ndoze-Ojo
- Minister of Home Affairs and Immigration: Pendukeni Iivula-Ithana (until February 2018), Frans Kapofi
  - Deputy: Erastus Uutoni
- Minister of Industrialisation, Trade and SME Development: Immanuel Ngatjizeko (until February 2018), Tjekero Tweya
  - Deputy: Piet van der Walt (until February 2018), Lucia Iipumbu
- Minister of Information and Communication Technology: Tjekero Tweya (until February 2018), Stanley Simataa
  - Deputy: Stanley Simaata (until February 2018), Engel Nawatiseb
- Minister of Justice: Albert Kawana (until February 2018), Sackeus Shanghala (until 13 November 2019), Frans Kapofi (acting)
  - Deputy: Lidwina Shapwa
- Minister of Labour, Industrial Relations and Employment Creation: Erkki Nghimtina
  - Deputy: Alpheus Muheua (until February 2018), Tommy Nambahu
- Minister of Land Reform: Utoni Nujoma
  - Deputy: Bernadus Swartbooi (until December 2016), Priscilla Boois (from.December 2016)
- Minister of Mines and Energy: Obeth Kandjoze (until February 2018), Tom Alweendo
  - Deputy: Kornelia Shilunga
- Minister of Poverty Eradication and Social Welfare: Bishop Zephania Kameeta
  - Deputy: Priscilla Beukes
  - Deputy: Reverend Aino Kapewangolo
- Minister of Presidential Affairs: Frans Kapofi (until February 2018), Immanuel Ngatjizeko (until February 2018), Martin Andjaba
  - Deputy: Christine ǁHoebes (until February 2018)
- Minister of Public Enterprises: Leon Jooste
  - Deputy: Engel Nawatiseb (until February 2018), Veikko Nekundi
- Minister of Safety and Security: Charles Namoloh
  - Deputy: Daniel Kashikola (Until September 2023), Lucia Witbooi (From September 2023- )
- Minister of Sport, Youth and National Service: Jerry Ekandjo.(until February 2018), Erastus Uutoni
  - Deputy: Agnes Tjongarero
- Minister of Urban and Rural Development: Sophia Shaningwa (until February 2018), Peya Mushelenga
  - Deputy: Derek Klazen
  - Deputy: Sylvia Makgone (until February 2018), Chief Samuel Ankama
- Minister of Veterans' Affairs: Nickey Iyambo
  - Deputy for the recognition of the disabled: Alexia Manombe-Ncube
  - Deputy for the recognition of marginalised people: Royal ǀUiǀoǀoo
  - Deputy for the recognition of veterans of the fight for independence: Hilma Nicanor
- Minister of Works and Transport: Alpheus ǃNaruseb (until February 2018), John Mutorwa
  - Deputy: Sankwasa James Sankwasa
  - Deputy: Kilus Nguvauva

=== 2010–2015 ===
This Cabinet was appointed in 2010. The SWAPO congress end of November 2012 resulted in "one of the biggest Cabinet reshuffles the country has seen since independence".

- President: Hifikepunye Pohamba
- Prime Minister: Nahas Angula (2010–2012), Hage Geingob (2012–2015)
- Deputy Prime Minister: Marco Hausiku
- Speaker of Parliament: Theo-Ben Gurirab
  - Deputy Speaker: Loide Kasingo
- Minister of Trade and Industry: Hage Geingob (2010–2012), Calle Schlettwein (2012–2015)
  - Deputy: Tjekero Tweya
- Minister of Justice: Pendukeni Iivula-Ithana (2010–2012), Utoni Nujoma (2012–2015)
  - Deputy: Tommy Nambahu
- Minister of Safety and Security: Nangolo Mbumba (2010–2012), Immanuel Ngatjizeko (2012–2015)
  - Deputy: Erastus Uutoni
- Minister of Presidential Affairs and Attorney General: Albert Kawana
  - Deputy: none
- Minister of Defence: Charles Namoloh (2010–2012), Nahas Angula (2012–2015)
  - Deputy: Lempy Lucas (2010–2012), Petrus Iilonga (2012–2015)
- Minister of Home Affairs and Immigration: Rosalia Nghidinwa (2010–2012), Pendukeni Iivula-Ithana (2012–2015)
  - Deputy: Elia Kaiyamo
- Minister of Finance: Saara Kuugongelwa-Amadhila
  - Deputy: Calle Schlettwein (2010–2012), vacant as from 4 December 2012
- Minister of Regional and Local Government, Housing and Rural Development: Jerry Ekandjo (2010–2012), Charles Namoloh (2012–2015)
  - Deputy: Priscilla Beukes
- Minister of Foreign Affairs: Utoni Nujoma (2010–2012), Netumbo Nandi-Ndaitwah (2012–)
  - Deputy: Peya Mushelenga
- Minister of Health: Richard Kamwi
  - Deputy: Petrina Haingura
- Minister of Education : Abraham Iyambo (until 2 February 2013), David Namwandi (from 21 February 2013)
  - Deputy: David Namwandi (until 20 February 2013), Silvia Makgone (from 21 February 2013)
- Minister of Lands and Resettlement: Alpheus ǃNaruseb
  - Deputy: Theo Diergaardt (appointed January 2011)
- Minister of Works and Transport: Erkki Nghimtina
  - Deputy: Chief Samuel Ankama (2010–2012), Chief Kilus Nguvauva (2012–2015)
- Minister of Agriculture, Water and Forestry: John Mutorwa
  - Deputy: Petrus Iilonga (2010–2012), Lempy Lucas (2012-2015)
- Minister of Environment and Tourism: Netumbo Nandi-Ndaitwah (2010–2012), Uahekua Herunga (2012–2015)
  - Deputy: Uahekua Herunga (2010–2012), Pohamba Shifeta (2012–)
- Minister of Labour and Social Welfare: Immanuel Ngatjizeko (2010–2012), Doreen Sioka (2012–2015)
  - Deputy: Alpheus Muheua
- Minister of Veterans' Affairs: Nickey Iyambo
  - Deputy: Hilma Nicanor (appointed in January 2011)
- Minister of Gender Equality and Child Welfare: Doreen Sioka (2010–2012), Rosalia Nghidinwa (2012–2015)
  - Deputy: Angelika Muharukua
- Minister of Information and Information Technology: Joel Kaapanda
  - Deputy: Stanley Simataa
- Minister of Fisheries and Marine Resources: Bernard Esau
  - Deputy: Chief Kilus Nguvauva (2010–2012), Chief Samuel Ankama (2012–2015)
- Minister of Mines and Energy: Isak Katali
  - Deputy: Willem Isaacks
- Minister of Youth, National Service, Sport and Culture: Kazenambo Kazenambo (2010–2012), Jerry Ekandjo (2012–2015)
  - Deputy: Pohamba Shifeta (2010–2012), Juliet Kavetuna (2012–2015)
- Auditor General: Junias Kandjeke

=== 2005–2010 ===
Below is a list of the Cabinet of the Republic of Namibia from appointment in 2005 until replacement in 2010:

- President: Hifikepunye Pohamba
- Prime Minister: Nahas Angula
- Deputy Prime Minister and Minister of Foreign Affairs: Marco Hausiku
- Minister of Defense: Major General Charles Ndaxu Namoloh
- Minister of Veterans Affairs: Ngarikutuke Tjiriange
- Minister of Education: Nangolo Mbumba
  - Deputy: Rebecca Ndjoze-Ojo
- Minister of Finance: Saara Kuugongelwa-Amadhila
- Minister of Safety and Security: Nickey Iyambo
- Minister of Trade and Industry: Immanuel Ngatjizeko (2005–2008), Hage Geingob (2008–2010)
  - Deputy: Bernhardt Esau
- Minister of Home Affairs and Immigration: Rosalia Nghidinwa
- Minister of Information and Broadcasting: Joel Kaapanda
  - Deputy: Raphael Dinyando
- Minister of Justice: Pendukeni Iivula-Ithana
- Minister of Mines and Energy: Erkki Nghimtina
- Minister of Labour and Social Welfare: Immanuel Ngatjizeko
  - Deputy: Petrus Iilonga
- Minister of Health and Social Service: Richard Kamwi
- Minister of Agriculture, Water, and Forestry: John Mutorwa
- Minister of Fisheries and Marine Resources: Abraham Iyambo
- Minister of Environment and Tourism: Willem Konjore (until 2008) Netumbo Nandi-Ndaitwah
- Minister of Lands and Resettlement: Alpheus ǃNaruseb
- Minister of Local and Regional Government, Housing and Rural Development: Jerry Ekandjo
  - Deputy: Kazenambo Kazenambo
- Minister of Works, Transport and Communication: Helmut Angula
  - Deputy: Paulus Kapia until October 2005, then Steve Mogotsi
- Minister of Gender Equality and Child Welfare: Marlene Mungunda
  - Deputy: Angelika Muharukua
- Minister of Youth, National Service, Sport, and Culture: Willem Konjore (since 2008)
  - Deputy: Pohamba Shifeta
- Minister of Presidential Affairs: Albert Kawana
- National Planning Commission Director: Peter Katjavivi
- Namibia Central Intelligence Service Director: Lukas Hangula

=== 2000–2005 ===
The third Cabinet of Sam Nujoma was announced on Independence Day 2000.

=== 1995–2000 ===
The second Cabinet under Sam Nujoma was announced on Independence Day 1995. In 1999 a re-shuffle took place, mainly affecting deputy ministers.

- President: Sam Nujoma
- Prime Minister: Hage Geingob
- Minister of Mines and Energy: Andimba Toivo ya Toivo (until 1999), Jesaya Nyamu
  - Deputy: Jesaya Nyamu (until 1999), Klaus Dierks

=== 1990–1995 ===
The first Cabinet after Namibian independence consisted of 19 ministers appointed by the inaugural president Sam Nujoma. In 1991, two additional ministries were established:

- President: Sam Nujoma
- Prime Minister: Hage Geingob
- Attorney-general: Hartmut Ruppel
- Director-general of the National Planning Commission: Zedakia Ngavirue
- Minister of Agriculture: Gert Hanekom (until 1992), Anton von Wietersheim (until 1993), Nangolo Mbumba
- Minister of Defence: Peter Mweshihange
- Minister of Education: Nahas Angula
- Minister of Environment: Niko Bessinger
- Minister of Finance: Otto Herrigel (until 1992), Gert Hanekom
- Minister of Fisheries (established 1991): Helmut Angula
- Minister of Foreign Affairs: Theo-Ben Gurirab
- Minister of Health: Nickey Iyambo
- Minister of Home Affairs: Hifikepunye Pohamba
- Minister of Information: Hidipo Hamutenya (until 1993), Ben Amathila
- Minister of Justice: Ngarikutuke Tjiriange
- Minister of Labour: Hendrik Witbooi
- Minister of Lands: Marco Hausiku
- Minister of Local Government: Libertina Amathila
- Minister of Mines and Energy: Andimba Toivo ya Toivo
- Minister of Trade: Ben Amathila (until 1993), Hidipo Hamutenya
- Minister of Works: Richard Kabajani
- Minister of Youth (established 1991): Pendukeni Ivula-Ithana
