= List of members of the 5th National Assembly of Namibia =

5th National Assembly of Namibia

Type
- Type: Bicameral

History
- Founded: 2010

Structure
- Seats: 78
- Political groups: SWAPO (54) RDP (8) DTA (2) Others (8) Appointed (6)

Below is a list of members of the 5th National Assembly of Namibia. They were selected by their parties based on the results of the 2009 parliamentary election. The members were in the National Assembly from 21 March 2010 until 21 March 2015. Members were chosen by their parties. Parties were voted in via proportional representation.

The 5th National Assembly consisted of 78 members: 72 elected from the party lists, and 6 without voting rights, appointed by the president. This National Assembly, like each of the previous National Assemblies, was led by the South West Africa People's Organization. The seat distribution for the voting members was as follows:

- South West Africa People's Organization (SWAPO): 54
- Rally for Democracy and Progress (RDP): 8
- Democratic Turnhalle Alliance (DTA): 2
- National Unity Democratic Organisation (NUDO): 2
- United Democratic Front (UDF): 2
- All People's Party (APP): 1
- Republican Party (RP): 1
- Congress of Democrats (CoD): 1
- South West Africa National Union (SWANU): 1

== Elected members ==
The following people were voting members of the 5th National Assembly, elected in the 2009 parliamentary election:

=== South West Africa People's Organization ===
- Theo-Ben Gurirab, speaker of the National Assembly
- Loide Kasingo, deputy speaker of the National Assembly
- Nahas Angula, prime minister
- Hage Geingob
- Pendukeni Iivula-Ithana
- Nangolo Mbumba
- Jerry Ekandjo
- Utoni Nujoma
- Alpheus ǃNaruseb
- Abraham Iyambo
- Petrina Haingura
- Richard Kamwi
- Kazenambo Kazenambo
- Joel Kaapanda
- Erkki Nghimtina
- John Mutorwa
- Tjekero Tweya
- Petrus Iilonga
- Immanuel Ngatjizeko
- Pohamba Shifeta
- Elia Kaiyamo
- Albert Kawana
- Bernhardt Esau
- Doreen Sioka
- Saara Kuugongelwa-Amadhila
- Paulus Kapia
- Charles Namoloh
- Peya Mushelenga
- Alpheus Muheua
- Priscilla Beukes
- Erastus Uutoni
- Billy Mwaningange
- Marco Hausiku
- Lucia Witbooi
- Angelika Muharukua
- Chief Samuel Ankama
- Uahekua Herunga
- Rosalia Nghidinwa
- Willem Isaack
- Nickey Iyambo
- Sylvia Makgone
- David Namwandi
- Piet van der Walt
- Lempy Lucas
- Isak Katali
- Tommy Nambahu
- Elifas Dingara
- Festus Ueitele
- Juliet Kavetuna
- Moses Amweelo
- Evelyn ǃNawases-Taeyele
- Alexia Manombe-Ncube
- Ben Amathila
- (Auguste Xoagus, died in December 2009 before being sworn in)
  - Netumbo Nandi-Ndaitwah (entered Parliament as #55 on the SWAPO party list after the death of Xoagus)

=== Rally for Democracy and Progress ===
- Hidipo Hamutenya
- Steve Bezuidenhout
- Jesaya Nyamu
- Agnes Limbo
- Anton von Wietersheim
- Kandy Nehova
- Peter Naholo
- Heiko Lucks

=== Democratic Turnhalle Alliance ===
- Katuutire Kaura
- Phillemon Moongo

=== National Unity Democratic Organisation ===
- Kuaima Riruako
- Arnold Tjihuiko

=== United Democratic Front ===
- Justus ǁGaroëb
- Simson Tjongarero

=== All People's Party ===
- Ignatius Shixwameni

=== Republican Party ===
In September 2010, Mudge and the Republican Party began the process of merging with the Rally for Democracy and Progress.

- Henk Mudge (resigned in 2011)
  - Clara Gowases; (replaced Mudge in 2011)

=== Congress of Democrats ===
- Ben Ulenga

=== South West Africa National Union ===
- Usutuaije Maamberua

== Appointed members ==
The following people were non-voting members of the 5th National Assembly, appointed by president Hifikepunye Pohamba:

- Sophia Swartz
- Maureen Jankowski
- Agnes Tjongarero
- Stanley Simataa
- Calle Schlettwein
- Peter Katjavivi

National Assembly of Namibia
Preceded by 4th National Assembly	5th National Assembly; 21 March 2010 – 21 March 2015	Succeeded by 6th National Assembly
