= Bernadette Jagger =

Namibian politician (born 1958)

Honourable Bernadette Jagger

Deputy Minister of Environment and Tourism
- Incumbent
- Assumed office 8 February 2018
- President: Hage Geingob
- Prime Minister: Saara Kuugongelwa-Amadhila
- Preceded by: Tommy Nambahu

Personal details
- Born: 26 February 1958 (age 68) Riemvasmaak, South Africa
- Education: University of Exeter; University of Warwick; University of Namibia; Sohnge Training College

Bernadette Maria Jagger (born 26 February 1958) is a Namibian politician. She is a member of SWAPO and became appointed to the party's Central Committee in 2012. In 2015 she won a seat in parliament. In a cabinet reshuffle in February 2018 she was appointed Deputy Minister of Environment and Tourism, succeeding Tommy Nambahu.

Jagger is a teacher by profession. She holds certificates in lower and higher primary education from Sohnge Training College and University of Namibia, respectively, and rose through the ranks from being a teacher in 1976, a deputy principal in 1992, to the Kunene Regional Director of Education in 2012. Jagger also obtained a Post Graduate Diploma in English Language Teaching and Administration from the University of Warwick, and a Bachelor of Philosophy in Education from the University of Exeter.

Jagger is a senior councillor of the Riemvasmakers community, a clan of the Nama people.
