= Sankwasa James Sankwasa =

Namibian politician

The Honourable Sankwasa James Sankwasa

Minister of Urban and Rural Development
- Incumbent
- Assumed office 22 March 2025
- President: Netumbo Nandi-Ndaitwah
- Prime Minister: Elijah Ngurare
- Preceded by: Erastus Uutoni

Personal details
- Born: May 5, 1955 (age 71) Sikanjabuka, Zambezi Region, Namibia
- Education: University of Leeds

Sankwasa James Sankwasa (born 5 May 1955) is a Namibian politician, currently serving as Minister of Urban and Rural development and legislator in the 8th National Assembly. He previously served as a Deputy Minister of Works and Transport from 2015 to 2020.

== Biography ==
Sankwasa was born on 5 May 1955 in Sikanjabuka district in the Zambezi Region. He holds a master's degree in Business Administration from Thames Valley University UK in 1997. He has also obtained a Master of Arts degree in Health Management, planning and policy from Leeds University, UK in 1994.

He became a Member of Parliament in the National Assembly of Namibia in 2015–2020. After the 2019 election in which SWAPO Party lost 14 seats, Sankwasa was unable to retain his seat in parliament. Subsequently, President Hage Geigob did not appoint him in his cabinet. However, he was appointed as Minister of Urban and Rural Development on the 21st of March 2025 by President of the Republic of Namibia Netumbo Nandi-Ndaitwah.

== Awards ==
On 12 December 2025, Sankwasa, was awarded Best Exceptional Achievement in Southern Africa in Housing and Urban Development 2025, from the Africa Housing Awards in Abuja, Nigeria
