= Auguste Xoagus =

Namibian politician

Auguste Xoagus (died 2009) was a Namibian politician. A member of SWAPO, Xoagus was a regional councilor for her party in Khorixas in the northwestern Kunene Region. Xoagus was on SWAPO list place 36 in the 2009 Namibian general election. SWAPO obtained 54 seats, placing her comfortably into the 5th National Assembly of Namibia. However, Xoagus died on 3 December 2009 before the 5th Assembly was sworn in. Netumbo Nandi-Ndaitwah, #55 on the list, took her place.
