= Nekundi =

Nekundi is a surname. Notable people with the surname include:

- Panduleni Nekundi (born 1998), Namibian footballer
- Veikko Nekundi (born 1977), Namibian politician
