= Linus Shashipapo Secondary School =

Secondary school in Kavango East, Namibia

Coordinates: 18.0315°S 20.7895°E

Information
- Established: 1974; 51 years ago

Linus Shashipapo Secondary School, founded 1974 but opened its door in June, is the second oldest secondary school in the former Kavango Region of Namibia. It is named after Linus Shashipapo, Hompa (king) of the Gciriku from 1945 to 1984. Notable alumni of the school are cabinet member John Mutorwa, former secretary-general of the SWAPO Party Youth League Dr. Elijah Ngurare, former governor of Kavango East Rev. Dr. Samuel Mbambo, Dr. Marius Kudumo, Markus Kampungu, chairperson of the Public Service Commission of Namibia and former teacher and principal of the school (Dr. Faustinus Shikukutu).

== See also ==
- List of schools in Namibia
- Education in Namibia
