= Paula Cooper =

Paula Cooper may refer to:

- Paula Cooper (art dealer), founder of a New York art gallery
- Paula Cooper, the murderer of Ruth Pelke

== See also ==
- Paula Kooper, Namibia politician
