= Mpande (name) =

Mpande is a name. Notable people with the name include:

- Mpande kaSenzangakhona (c. 1798–1872), Zulu monarch
- Joseph Mpande (born 1994), Ugandan footballer
- Annakletha Mpande Sikerete (born 1968), Namibian politician
- Dabulamanzi kaMpande (c. 1839–1886), Zulu commander
