= Hamunyera Hambyuka =

Namibian politician

Hamunyera Hambyuka MP

Government Chief Whip of the National Assembly of Namibia
- Incumbent
- Assumed office 20 March 2020
- Preceded by: Evelyn !Nawases-Taeyele

Member of the National Assembly of Namibia
- Incumbent
- Assumed office 20 March 2015

Personal details
- Born: Julius Hamunyera Hambyuka; 25 March 1966 (age 60) Tondoro, South West Africa
- Party: SWAPO
- Education: Polytechnic of Namibia
- Occupation: Member of Parliament
- Profession: Politician

Julius Hamunyera Hambyuka (born 25 March 1966) is a Namibian politician who has served as a Member of the National Assembly of Namibia since March 2015. A member of the ruling SWAPO party, he was appointed the Government Chief Whip of the National Assembly in March 2020.

== Background and education ==
Hambyuka was born on 25 March 1966 in Tondoro in the former South West Africa, now Namibia. He matriculated from Dr Romanus Kampungu Senior Secondary School and went on to study at the Polytechnic of Namibia where he obtained a diploma in business management and administration and a certificate in event management. Hambyuka started his career by working at the Katemo Agriculture Cooperative.

== Political career ==
Within SWAPO, he was a regional administrator from 1998 to 2000, a deputy party director from 2001 to 2003, and the director of administration at the party's regional branch in Kavango West from 2004 until 2015. He was elected to Parliament in November 2014. He took office as an MP on 20 March 2015. He was largely a backbencher during his first term.

At the 2019 general election, he was re-elected for a second term as a parliamentarian. When the National Assembly convened in March 2020, Hambyuka was named SWAPO chief whip and consequently became the Government Chief Whip of the National Assembly.
