= Ueitele =

Ueitele is a surname. Notable people with the surname include:

- Festus Ueitele, Namibian politician
- Shafimana Ueitele (born 1963), Namibian judge
