= Emilia Nuyoma-Amupewa =

Namibian politician (born 1955)

MP Emilia Nuyoma-Amupewa

Member of the National Assembly of Namibia
- In office 20 March 2015 – 20 March 2020

Mayor of Lüderitz
- In office 1998–2011

Personal details
- Born: May 5, 1955 (age 71) Onembaba–Okalongo, Omusati Region, Namibia

Emilia Nuyoma-Amupewa (born 5 May 1955) is a Namibian politician. A member of the South West African People's Organization, she served from 2015 to 2020 as a member of the National Assembly of Namibia.

Prior to her career in politics, Nuyoma-Amupewa went into exile in Angola where she would join the People's Liberation Army of Namibia. Nuyoma-Amupewa was later involved in and survived the Battle of Cassinga. Following this, she would emigrate to the German Democratic Republic where she would study commerce.

After returning to Namibia, she got a job as a literature teacher and worked in the SWAPO Women's Council. She would go onward to become mayor of Lüderitz, a position she held from 1998 until 2011.
