= Charles Mubita =

Namibian politician and member of parliament

Member of the National Assembly of Namibia
- Incumbent
- Assumed office 20 March 2025

Personal details
- Party: SWAPO

Charles Mubita is a Namibian politician from SWAPO. He has been appointed as minister in the presidency since 2 April 2026, he also serves as a member of the Parliament of Namibia since 2025.

He was a deputy minister of Defence and Veterans Affairs in the Cabinet of Namibia. He is a member of the SWAPO Central Committee.

== See also ==
- List of members of the 8th National Assembly of Namibia
