= Norah Munsu =

Namibian politician (born 1969)

Member of the National Assembly
- In office 20 March 2015 – 20 March 2020

Personal details
- Born: 4 February 1960 (age 66) Zambezi Region, Namibia
- Party: South West African People's Organization

Norah Munsu is a Namibian politician. A member of the South West African People's Organization (SWAPO), she served as a member National Assembly of Namibia from 2015 to 2020.

In 2015, Munsu would be a speaker at a seminar operated by the Inter-Parliamentary Union. In 2017, she served on a delegation to Kenya. This led to her encouraging the Namibian government to adopt Kenya's housing scheme.
