= Otamanzi Constituency =

Electoral constituency in the Omusati region of northern Namibia

Coordinates: 17°59′S 15°15′E

Otamanzi Constituency (red) in the Omusati Region

Otamanzi Constituency is an electoral constituency in the Omusati Region of Namibia. It had 7,427 registered voters in 2020. Its district capital is the settlement of Otamanzi. Otamanzi Constituency covers an area of 4,184 km^{2} (1,615 sq mi). It had a population of 13,495 in 2011, down from 27,049 in 2001. The constituency contains the settlements of Onandjo, Kelimwe, Etilyasa, Onanyala, Onkani, Iiyekeya, Epato, Amarika, Etsikilo, and Onkaankaa.

Otamanzi Constituency was created in 2003 from existing constituencies of Omusati, following a recommendation of the Third Delimitation Commission of Namibia, and in preparation of the 2004 regional election

== Politics ==
Otamanzi constituency is traditionally a stronghold of the South West Africa People's Organization (SWAPO) party. In the 2004 regional election SWAPO candidate Efraim Kuugongelwa won uncontested and became councillor after no opposition party nominated a candidate.

In the 2015 regional elections SWAPO candidate Johannes Iiyambo won uncontested and became councillor after no opposition party nominated a candidate. Councillor Iiyambo (SWAPO) was reelected in the 2020 regional election. He obtained 3,325 votes, far ahead of Petrus Amunimwe of the Independent Patriots for Change (IPC, an opposition party formed in August 2020), who obtained 332 votes.
