= SWAPO Party Youth League =

Youth wing of SWAPO party, Namibia

- Secretary General: Ephraim Nekongo
- Founded: 1969
- Headquarters: Windhoek; Khomas Region
- Mother party: SWAPO
- International affiliation: International Union of Socialist Youth (IUSY); World Federation of Democratic Youth (WFDY)
- Magazine: Oshinyanga
- Website: spyl.swapo.party

The SWAPO Party Youth League (SPYL), formerly known as the SWAPO Youth League (SYL), is the youth wing of the SWAPO Party, the ruling party of Namibia since 1990. It shares the same principles as those of the SWAPO Party.

== Foundation ==
SPYL came into existence in 1969 after the SWAPO Tanga Consultative Congress in Tanzania adopted a new constitution. In 1971, the International Court of Justice declared South African occupation of Namibia as illegal. At that time there existed pervasive disgruntlement in the country due to the Odendaal Plan that was going to initiate a homelands policy. The Youth league protested at major colleges and schools and participated at the general strike of 1971 and 1972, a major turning point in the Namibian fight for independence. There was also a schools' boycott in northern Namibia in 1973 against the Bantustan policy. These activities resulted in the arrest and imprisonment at Robben Island of many youth leaders, including Nashilongo Taapopi, Jerry Ekandjo and Martin Kapewasha among others.

Once the Portuguese revolution struck in May 1974, it was possible for Namibian youth to leave the country via Angola. Thousands of youth left Namibia between May and December 1974 to join SWAPO abroad, majority ended up serving in the People's Liberation Army of Namibia (PLAN). Youth activist Keshii Pelao Nathanael, was the leader of the internal radical youth inside the country. He and his youth group members orchestrated most of these strikes. He was elected as the founding president of the SWAPO Youth League at the Oniipa Congress in 1974 before going into exile.

== Structure and organs ==
The National Organs of SPYL are established under the SPYL constitution and are chaired by the Secretary. These are the Congress, which is the highest decision making body of SPYL, the Central Committee, and the National Executive Committee. The SPYL constitution also makes provision for duties and functions of SPYL national office-bearers which are:

- The Secretary, also SPYL President
- Deputy Secretary
- Secretary for Finance and Administration
- Secretary for Information, Publicity and Mobilisation
- Secretary for International Affairs
- Secretary for Labour and Justice
- Secretary for Education, SWAPO Pioneer Movement and Culture
- Secretary for Economic Affairs
- Secretary for Health, Population and Environment
- Two additional members

== Leaders ==
- Sheeli Shangula
- Keshii Nathanael, 1974 – 1976
- Ignatius Shixwameni, 1987 – 1997
- Paulus Kapia, 1997 – 2007
- Elijah Ngurare, 2007 – 2015 (expelled from position)
- Veikko Nekundi, 2015 – 2017 (acting)
- Ephraim Tuhadeleni Nekongo, 2017–present

== Notable members ==
- Job Amupanda, former SPYL Secretary for Information
- Jerry Ekandjo, former government minister; member of SPYL from 1963–79
- Natangwe Ithete, Deputy Prime Minister and Minister of Industrialisation, Mines and Energy, and former Secretary of Education of SPYL 2007-2012.
- Elia Irimari, former governor of Oshana Region, Former SPYL activist
- Ndali Che Kamati, Namibian Ambassador to Russia, former vice-president of International Union of Students and SPYL activist during the 1980s.
- Naftali Kambungu, vice-president of the World Federation of Democratic Youth and former Secretary of Labour and Justice of SPYL 2012-2015.
- Kazenambo Kazenambo, former government minister, member of the SPYL central committee from 1991–2002
- Saara Kuugongelwa-Amadhila, Prime Minister of Namibia and former Secretary of Economic Affairs of SPYL 1997-2002.
- Peya Mushelenga, former Minister of International Relations and Cooperation and former Secretary of International Affairs of SPYL 2007-2012.
- Charles Ndaxu Namoloh, former Minister of Safety and Security, he fled to Zambia with SPYL in 1974
- Sackeus Shanghala, former Minister of Justice and former Secretary of Labour and Justice of SPYL 2007-2012.
- Pohamba Shifeta, former Minister of Environment and Tourism and former central committee member of SPYL 1997-2002.
- Piet van der Walt, government minister, businessperson

== See also ==
- Democratic Co-operative Party
