= Uahekua Herunga =

Namibian politician

The Honourable Uahekua Herunga MP

Minister of Environment and Tourism
- In office 4 December 2012 – 21 March 2015
- Preceded by: Netumbo Nandi-Ndaitwah
- Succeeded by: Pohamba Shifeta

Deputy Minister of Environment and Tourism
- In office 21 March 2010 – 4 December 2012
- Succeeded by: Pohamba Shifeta

Personal details
- Party: SWAPO
- Occupation: Politician

Uahekua Herunga (born 25 October 1969) is a Namibian politician who has served in the Namibian cabinet for various portfolios. A member of SWAPO serving as a deputy secretary general of the party.

Herunga obtained his Diploma in Education from Ongwediva Teachers Training College, right after Namibia independence.

== Political career ==
Herunga joined SWAPO in 1983. Herunga started his political career in the late 1980s, when he joined the SWAPO's youth wing and the Namibia National Students Organisation (Nanso). Herunga was a regional coordinator for his party in the northwestern Kunene Region in 2007, prior to his appointment to the 5th National Assembly of Namibia in 2009 as a choice of president Hifikepunye Pohamba. He was subsequently appointed deputy Minister of Environment and Tourism and promoted to Minister in a cabinet reshuffle in December 2012, following the fifth SWAPO congress.
