= Panduleni =

Panduleni is a given name. Notable people with the name include:

- Panduleni Itula (born 1957), Namibian politician
- Panduleni Nekundi (born 1998), Namibian footballer
