= Verna Sinimbo =

Namibian politician

Governor of Kavango West
- Incumbent
- Assumed office March 2025
- Preceded by: Sirkka Ausiku

Personal details
- Party: SWAPO

Verna Sinimbo is a Namibian politician from the South West Africa People's Organization (SWAPO), currently serving as Governor for Kavango West. She was appointed in March 2025. She previously served as Deputy Minister of Industrialisation and Trade in the Cabinet of Namibia.

== See also ==
- List of members of the 7th National Assembly of Namibia
