= Engel Nawatiseb =

Namibian politician (born 1969)

Deputy Minister of Information and Communication Technology
- In office 2018–2020
- President: Hage Geingob
- Prime Minister: Saara Kuugongelwa-Amadhila
- Succeeded by: Emma Theofilus

Deputy Minister of Public Enterprises
- In office 2015–2018
- President: Hage Geingob
- Prime Minister: Saara Kuugongelwa-Amadhila

Member of the National Assembly
- In office 20 March 2015 – 20 March 2020

Personal details
- Born: 20 June 1969 (age 56) Oshikoto Region, Namibia
- Party: South West African People's Organization (2015–2024) (Since 2024)
- Other political affiliations: Landless People's Movement (2024)

Engelbrecht A. Nawatiseb (born 20 June 1969) is a Namibian politician. A member of the South West African People's Organization (SWAPO), he served as a member of the National Assembly from 2015 to 2020. While serving in the National Assembly, he held offices as Deputy Minister of Public Enterprises from 2015 to 2018 and as Deputy Minister of Information and Communication Technology from 2018 to 2020. Prior to his career in politics, he attended and graduated from Otjikoto Secondary School and served as a road contractor. His membership in SWAPO was briefly interrupted for about a month in 2024, when he left SWAPO to join the Landless People's Movement (LPM). This decision came after Nawatiseb made calls for younger leadership within SWAPO. Nawatiseb later quickly abandoned the party to rejoin SWAPO.

Nawatiseb began to suffer from kidney failure in 2021; he later praised private dialysis centres for providing care for his condition. In 2024, the Namibian Government sued Nawatiseb for his refusal to pay an unused travel allowance from a cancelled trip to Spain, as well as for salary overpayment. Nawatiseb faced controversy the same year when a video of him slapping a bartender in Tsumeb was circulated online. Nawatiseb defended his actions, stating that the bar was causing noise pollution. This claim was disputed by the bartender. The video was criticised by members of the Popular Democratic Movement, to which Nawatiseb responded by describing the PDM as a "total reject in Tsumeb". In 2024, Nawatiseb was accused of "orchestrating a scheme" and "rushing" to sell a house before a bank he was affiliated with was to be liquidated.
