= Namibia African People's Democratic Organisation =

The Namibia African People's Democratic Organisation (NAPDO) was a political party in Namibia, based amongst the Damara people. It was founded in 1970.

In 1972 NAPDO joined the National Convention (NC, later NNC).

In 1976 NAPDO left the Namibia National Convention, and merged with the South West Africa People's Organisation (SWAPO).
