= Royal ǀUiǀoǀoo =

Namibian politician

The Honourable Royal ǀUiǀoǀoo

Deputy Minister of Marginalised People
- In office 21 March 2015 – 21 March 2025
- President: Hage Geingob
- Prime Minister: Saara Kuugongelwa-Amadhila
- Preceded by: Nickey Iyambo

Personal details
- Born: 30 September 1966 (age 59) Tsumkwe
- Party: SWAPO

Royal Johan Kxao ǀUiǀoǀoo (Note: The letter ⟨ǀ⟩ is a dental click. Pronunciation at beginning and at 1m in Namibian Broadcasting Corp. (Dec 7, 2018). "Minister ǀUiǀoǀoo hopes rights of indigenous people whitepaper approved by Cabinet". YouTube.com.) (Note: commonly rendered "/Ui/o/oo" due to technical limitations, e.g. in "Deputy Minister Royal ǀUiǀoǀoo on representing minorities in the Vice Presidency Office". YouTube.com.) (born 30 September 1966) is a Namibian politician who served in the cabinet of Namibia as deputy Minister of Marginalised People from 21 March 2015 to 21 March 2025. He was a member of Parliament as a SWAPO backbencher between 2000 and 2010, and after that a special advisor in the Office of the Deputy Prime Minister.

== Early life and education ==
ǀUiǀoǀoo was born on 30 September 1966 in Tsumkwe in the Otjozondjupa Region. He grew up in Botswana. Between 1991 and 1997 he worked as a teacher at different schools. In 2000 he finished his matric at NamCOL and holds a certificate in Linguistic Studies in African Languages. As of 2016 he is enrolled at Unisa for a law degree.

ǀUiǀoǀoo is an ethnic ǃKung from Tsumkwe's Juǀʼhoan-speaking community, for which he is also a senior traditional officer. At the time he became a parliamentarian in 2000, he was the youngest ever SWAPO MP. He also was the first and only San to serve in Parliament.
