= SWAPO for Justice =

Splinter group of SWAPO in Namibia

SWAPO for Justice, a splinter group of SWAPO in Namibia, was founded on 4 May 1995. SWAPO-J was led by Sakari Njoba Nghewete. SWAPO-J's cadre was mainly made up by former combatants of SWAPO, dissatisfied with their condition in independent Namibia.
