= Elijah Ngurare =

Namibian politician (born 1970)

The Right Honorable Elijah Ngurare
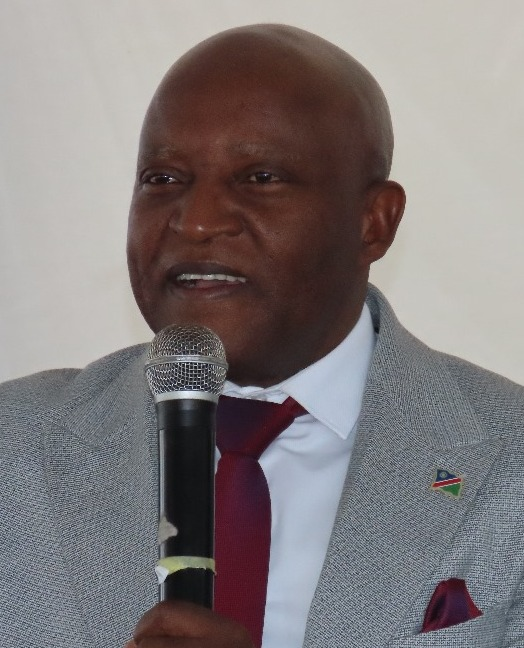
- Ngurare in 2025

Prime Minister of Namibia
- Incumbent
- Assumed office 21 March 2025
- President: Netumbo Nandi-Ndaitwah
- Deputy: Natangwe Ithete (2025)
- Preceded by: Saara Kuugongelwa

Secretary General of the SWAPO Party Youth League
- In office 2007–2015
- Preceded by: Paulus Kapia
- Succeeded by: Veikko Nekundi

Secretary for Information, Publicity and Mobilisation of the SWAPO Party Youth League
- In office 2002–2007
- Succeeded by: Job Amupanda

Personal details
- Born: Elijah Tjitunga Ngurare; 28 October 1970 (age 55) Nkurenkuru, Kavangoland, South West Africa
- Party: SWAPO
- Spouse: Albertina Mbute Ngurare
- Children: 4
- Education: Central State University; University of Dundee; University College Cork

Tjitunga Elijah Ngurare (born 28 October 1970) is a Namibian politician and academic who is the current Prime Minister of Namibia. A long-time member and supporter of SWAPO, Namibia's ruling party, he rose through the ranks of the SWAPO Party Youth League (SPYL), first serving as the Secretary for Information, Publicity, and Mobilisation from 2002, before becoming Secretary-General in 2007. He held this position until 2015, when he was expelled from the party.

He previously served as an academic at the University of Namibia and later as a director in the Ministry of Agriculture. On 21 March 2025, President Netumbo Nandi-Ndaitwah appointed him as the Prime Minister of the Republic of Namibia.

== Early life and education ==
Ngurare was born on 28 October 1970 in Nkurenkuru, Kavangoland, in the then South West Africa to a peasant family during the South African Border War. His father had four wives and his mother was the youngest in the union. As a little boy, he looked after his father's cattle and goats like all other boys at the time. He is the eldest of his mother's nine children.

Ngurare attended school at ELCIN Nkurenkuru High School, Linus Shashipapo Secondary School, Rundu Senior Secondary School, and Kolin Foundation Secondary School in Arandis, He then studied at the Central State University, Ohio (USA) with a presidential honours scholarship. He graduated magna cum laude with a Bachelor of Science degree in Water Resources Management and International Relations. He then pursued a Master of Laws from the University of Dundee, Scotland, where he held a British Chevening Scholarship, and a PhD from the National University of Ireland, Cork in 2009.

== Political career ==
Ngurare's political activities began in 1983 while attending Nkurenkuru High School and continued at Linus Shashipapo Secondary School, where he was a student during the founding of the student movement Namibia National Students Organisation in 1984. He joined SWAPO in 1986, and held various student positions and was active in Section, Branches and District Leadership of the SWAPO Party Youth League (SPYL). After completing high school, Ngurare sought financial assistance to study abroad and even approached the then-Prime Minister Hage Geingob in 1992 for support, but was reportedly declined. Despite this setback, he managed to pursue his studies in the United States, where he spent a decade.

Upon his return, he re-entered politics and emerged as one of Namibia's earliest tech-savvy politicians. At a time when many relied on secretaries for note-taking, he typed his own documents on a laptop and was an early adopter of social media, using it to bring the SWAPO Party Youth League (SPYL) closer to young Namibians. By 2004, his political approach had captivated the youth. He recruited local musicians like Gazza, The Dogg, and Gal Level to perform at SWAPO events.

Ngurare first gained political prominence in 2002 when he was appointed Secretary of Information, Publicity, and Mobilisation of the SWAPO Party Youth League (SPYL) under Paulus Kapia.. He assumed leadership of SPYL in 2005 after Kapia was forced to resign following a corruption scandal. In 2007, he was elected as Secretary-General of SPYL and became a regular contributor to the Namibia Today paper, a newspaper owned by SWAPO, writing propaganda articles for the party. He also played a role in setting up the SWAPO think-tank and organizing the party's first policy conference in 2012. Under his leadership, the youth league prioritized access to water, sanitation, and housing, advocating for improved service delivery.

In 2015, he lost his position as Secretary-General and was expelled from SWAPO alongside Affirmative Repositioning founder Job Amupanda for "bringing the party's name into disrepute, and [..] insulting party leaders". He was reinstated as SWAPO member following a lengthy court process in 2017. He then joined the Ministry of Agriculture as Director for Rural Water Supply and Sanitation coordination in March 2020. Ngurare also served as Deputy Executive Director in the same Ministry. He resigned from this position on 6 December 2024 to transition to Parliament. SWAPO Vice President Netumbo Nandi-Ndaitwah nominated him to the party's parliamentary list during the electoral college. Following SWAPO's victory in the 2024 general elections, Ngurare was appointed Prime Minister of Namibia on 21 March 2025.

== Business career ==
He served on the board of directors at Namdeb Diamond Corporation (Pty) Ltd, Namdeb Holdings (Pty) Ltd, Africa Online (Pty) Ltd, MultiChoice Namibia, Kalahari Holdings (Pty) Ltd and Namibia Water Corporation Ltd.

== Personal life ==
Ngurare is married to Dr. Albertina Mbute Ngurare. They have four children. As a Christian, he is Lutheran by religion and an ardent church-goer.

Beyond politics, he was a member of the music group Rasta Rebels in Kaisosi, Rundu, during the early 1980s.

Political offices
Preceded by Saara Kuugongelwa	Prime Minister of Namibia; 2025–present	Succeeded by Incumbent
