= Emma Kantema-Gaomas =

Namibian politician

Dr. Emma Kantema

Minister of Gender Equality and Child Welfare
- Incumbent
- Assumed office 21 March 2020
- President: Netumbo Nandi-Ndaitwah; Hage Geingob; Nangolo Mbumba
- Prime Minister: Elijah Ngurare
- Preceded by: Doreen Sioka
- Incumbent
- Assumed office 22 March 2025

Personal details
- Born: 16 August 1978 (age 48) Rupara, South West Africa (now Namibia)
- Occupation: Minister and Member of Parliament

Emma Kantema (born 16 August 1978) is a Namibian politician who is currently serving as a Minister of Gender and Child Welfare of the Republic of Namibia since 21 March 2025. She has been a member of the National Assembly for SWAPO since 2020. From 21 March 2020 to 21 March 2025, she has served as Deputy Minister of Sport, Youth and National Service.

== Early life and education ==
Dr Emma Kantema was born in Rupara, Kavango. She was the eldest of five daughters and attended her local school, before moving to Windhoek, and pursuing a Degree in Natural Resource Management at the Namibia University of Science and Technology. She holds a Doctorate Degree in Business Administration from the University of Namibia. She also holds a Master's degree in Business Administration.

== Political career ==
In March 2020, President Hage Geingob appointed Kantema-Gaomas as Deputy Minister of Sport, Youth and National Service. Concurrently, she was also appointed deputy by decree in the National Assembly by the President, allowing her to be a member of the government. She is a member of the Central Committee of the SWAPO party.

== Personal life ==
Dr Kantema is married to her husband Bryan Gaomab and they have two sons.
