= Liina Namupala =

Namibian politician

MP Liina Namupala

Member of the National Assembly of Namibia
- In office 20 March 2015 – 20 March 2020

Personal details
- Born: February 16, 1958 (age 68) Ohainana-Eenhana, Namibia

Liina Namupala (born 16 February 1958) is a Namibian politician. A member of the South West Africa People's Organization, she served as a member of National Assembly of Namibia from 2015 to 2020.

Namupala served on the Namibian Conservation Parliamentary Caucus.
