= Alpheus Muheua =

Namibian politician (c. 1956–2022)

- Born: c. 1956
- Died: 16 February 2022 (aged 65); Swakopmund, Namibia
- Occupation: Politician

Alpheus Muheua (c. 1956 – 16 February 2022) was a Namibian politician who served as the deputy minister of Labour and Social Welfare.

== Career ==
A member of SWAPO, Muheua was elected to the National Assembly of Namibia in the 2009 general election.

He was subsequently appointed to the position of Deputy Minister of Labour and Social Welfare in Pohamba's second cabinet.

On 1 May 2010, Muheua applauded Namibia's 2008 Labour law, part of which was declared unconstitutional by the Supreme Court of Namibia in 2008.

On 16 February 2022, Muheua died from COVID-19 in Swakopmund at the age of 65.
