= Nico Smit =

Namibian politician

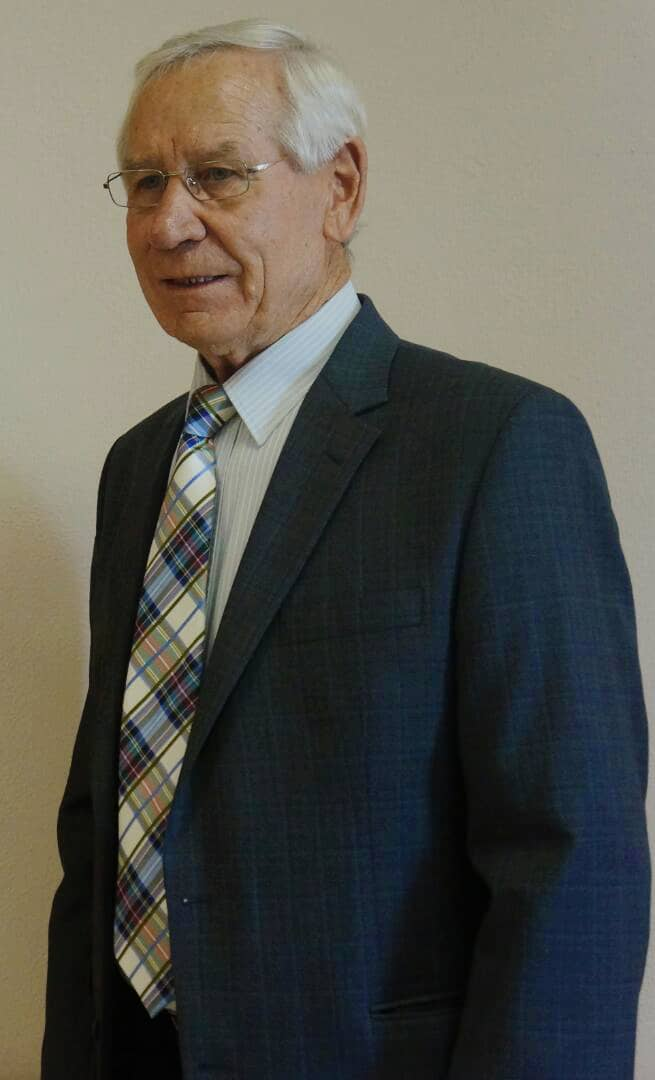
- Smit in 2019 at the opening of the Parliament of Namibia

Member of National Assembly
- Incumbent
- Assumed office 27 November 1990

Personal details
- Born: South West Africa

Nico Smit is a Namibian politician who has served in the National Assembly since Namibia's independence in 1990. He represents the Popular Democratic Movement.

== Political career ==
Smit began his politics career in the 1980s in the fight against apartheid for the Independence of Namibia. Since his election to the Namibian parliament, he has served in various parliamentary committees including the Foreign Affairs Committee and the Economics and Public Administration Committee.
