= Aino Kapewangolo =

Namibian pastor and politician

- Born: 23 July 1949 (age 76); Engela
- Education: Diploma in Theology
- Occupation: Pastor
- Years active: Deputy Minister of Poverty Eradication and Social Welfare 2015-2020 Ordained ELCIN Pastor 1992-2014 Special Advisor to Oshikoto Region Governor 2014-2015
- Title: Reverend

Aino Kapewangolo (born July 23, 1949, in Engela, Ohangwena Region) is a Namibian pastor and politician. Kapewangolo is a SWAPO Party member and pastor of the Evangelical Lutheran Church in Namibia (ELCIN). She served as a member of Parliament in the National Assembly from 2015-2020. She also served as a Deputy Minister of Poverty Eradication and Social Welfare.

== Education and career ==
Kapewangolo holds a Diploma in Theology from Paulinum Theological Seminary at Otjimbingwe, she enrolled from 1970 to 1973. In 1974–1980, Kapewangolo in her early religion career, worked as a leader of the ELCIN Women's League, and she was also a member of the Lutheran World Federation of Women in Church and Society from 1986–995. She further served as ELCIN Theologian from 1973 until 1991. Kapewangolo was appointed to serve as an ordained ELCIN pastor from 1992-2–14. From 2014-2–2015, she was appointed as a special advisor to the governor of Oshikoto Region. Kapewangolo was appointed from 2015 to 2020 as Deputy Minister of Poverty Eradication and Social Welfare.
