= Calle Schlettwein =

Namibian politician (born 1954)

The Honourable Calle Schlettwein MP
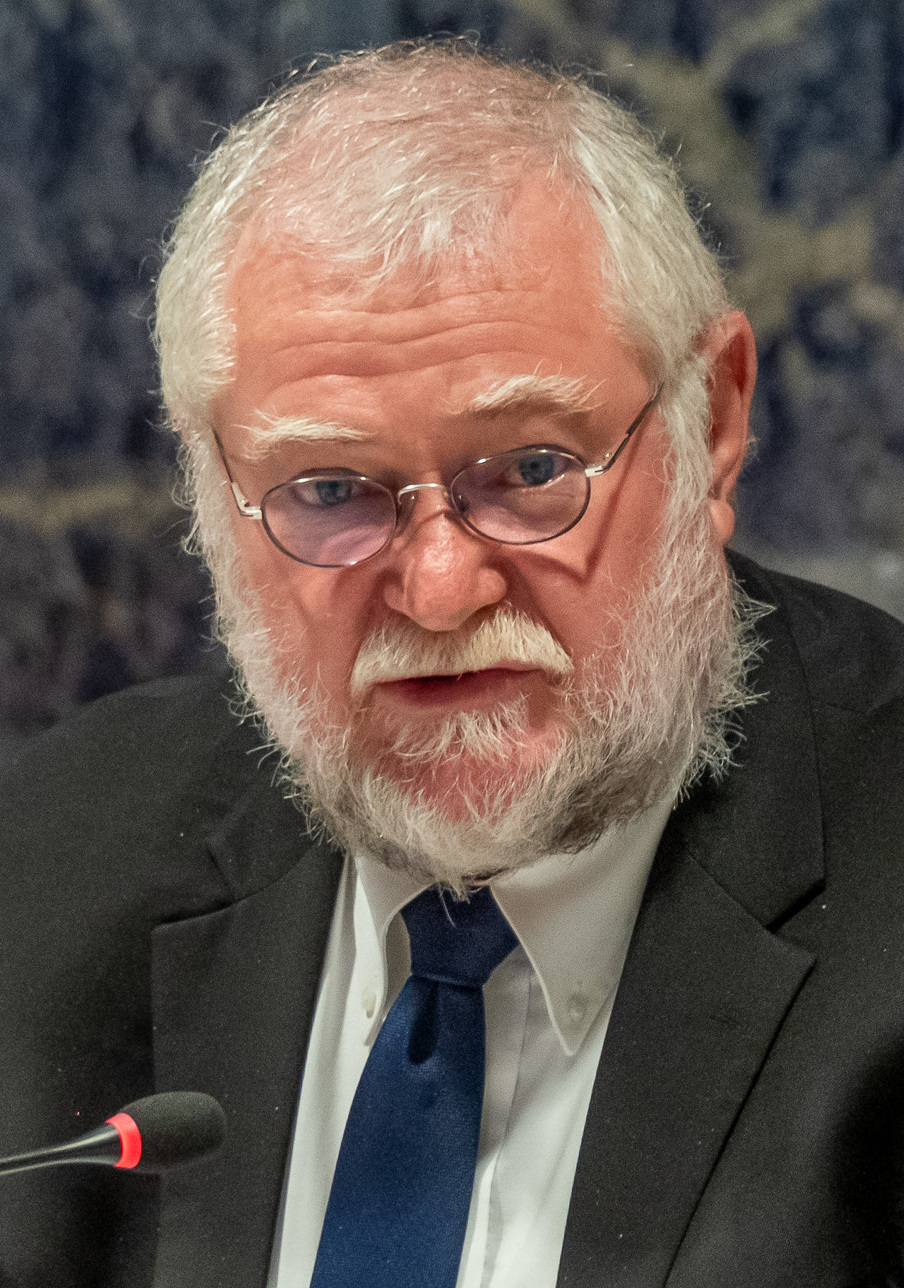
- Calle Schlettwein in 2019

Minister of Agriculture, Water and Land Reform
- In office 18 March 2020 – 21 March 2025
- President: Hage Geingob
- Preceded by: Alpheus !Naruseb

Minister of Finance
- In office 21 March 2015 – 18 March 2020
- President: Hage Geingob
- Prime Minister: Saara Kuugongelwa-Amadhila
- Preceded by: Saara Kuugongelwa-Amadhila
- Succeeded by: Ipumbu Shiimi

Minister of Trade and Industry
- In office 4 December 2012 – 21 March 2015
- President: Hifikepunye Pohamba
- Prime Minister: Hage Geingob
- Preceded by: Hage Geingob
- Succeeded by: Immanuel Ngatjizeko

Deputy Minister of Finance
- In office 2010–2012
- President: Hifikepunye Pohamba
- Prime Minister: Nahas Angula
- Succeeded by: Natangwe Ithete

Personal details
- Born: 13 June 1954 (age 72) Otjiwarongo, South West Africa (now Namibia)
- Party: SWAPO
- Education: Stellenbosch University

Carl-Hermann Gustav "Calle" Schlettwein (born 13 June 1954) is a Namibian politician who has served in the country's cabinet from 2012 to 21 March 2025. In March 2020 to 21 March 2025 he was appointed the Minister of Agriculture, Water and Land Reform after serving as the Minister of Finance from 2015 to 2020 and previously as the Minister of Trade and Industry from 2012 to 2015.

== Early life ==
Schlettwein is of German Namibian descent. He attended the Deutsche Höhere Privatschule Windhoek. Between 1974 and 1980 Schlettwein studied Entomology, Zoology and Botany at the University of Stellenbosch. Later he worked as researcher in the Department of Water Affairs.

== Career ==
Beginning at Namibian Independence in 1990, Schlettwein served as permanent secretary in various ministries. After seven years of deployment in the Ministry of Finance, President Hifikepunye Pohamba appointed Schlettwein to the National Assembly as one of the six non-voting Members of Parliament appointed by the President for the term that began in March 2010. He was then appointed as Deputy Minister of Finance in 2010. In a Cabinet reshuffle following the 2012 SWAPO congress, Schlettwein was promoted to Minister of Trade and Industry on 4 December 2012. In this position, he became the first white senior cabinet member since the early post-independence years.

Under president Hage Geingob, Schlettwein was moved to the post of Minister of Finance in March 2015. After Geingob's reelection in 2019, Schlettwein was moved to lead the Ministry of Agriculture, Water and Land Reform where he served until 21 March 2025.

== Other activities ==
- African Development Bank (AfDB), Ex-Officio Member of the Board of Governors (since 2015)
- International Monetary Fund (IMF), Ex-Officio Member of the Board of Governors (since 2015)
- Multilateral Investment Guarantee Agency (MIGA), World Bank Group, Ex-Officio Member of the Board of Governors (since 2015)
- World Bank, Ex-Officio Member of the Board of Governors (since 2015)

== Recognition ==
On Heroes' Day 2014, Schlettwein was conferred the Most Excellent Order of the Eagle, Second Class.
