= Sebastian Karupu =

Namibian politician

MP Sebastian Karupu

Member of the National Assembly of Namibia
- In office 20 March 2015 – 6 January 2020
- Incumbent
- Assumed office 20 March 2020

Governor of Kavango Region
- In office 1999–2004

Personal details
- Born: February 18, 1962 (age 64) Shamvhura, Namibia
- Party: SWAPO

Sebastian Karupu (born 18 February 1962) is a Namibian politician. A member of the South West Africa People's Organization, he has served as a member of the National Assembly of Namibia since 2015. Prior to his service in the National Assembly he served as the governor of Kavango Region.

In early 2020, Karupu would be replaced following his resignation from the National Assembly, though would be reelected in the 2019 Namibian general election.

From 15 July to 19 July 2024, Karupu led a delegation to Uganda in order to discuss governmental use of technology with the Ugandan Institute of Information and Communications Technology.
