= Rebecca Ndjoze-Ojo =

Namibian politician

The Honourable Rebecca Kapitire Ndjoze-Ojo

Deputy minister of Higher Education
- In office March 2005 – March 2010
- Succeeded by: David Namwandi

Personal details
- Born: 18 March 1956 (age 70) South West Africa
- Party: SWAPO
- Education: University of Durham, England; Ahmadu Bello University (Nigeria)
- Occupation: Politician
- Profession: Educator

Rebecca Kapitire "Becky" Ndjoze-Ojo (born 18 March 1956) is a Namibian politician and educator. A member of SWAPO, Ndjoze-Ojo is a member of the National Assembly and was deputy minister of Higher Education from 2005 to 2010.

== Career ==
Njjoze-Ojo was born on 18 March 1956 in Windhoek's Old Location. She attended the Augustineum Training College and trained to become a teacher at University of Ulster, United Kingdom. She graduated with B.Ed. and B.Ed. (Honours) degrees. Ndjoze-Ojo further holds a M.A. in applied linguistics from University of Durham and a PhD in English from Ahmadu Bello University, Nigeria.

From 1978 to 1986, Ndjoze-Ojo taught at various high schools in Windhoek's black and coloured townships of Katutura and Khomasdal. Leaving Namibia in 1986, she went to Nigeria, where she studied and taught at Ahmadu Bello University in Zaria. She returned to Namibia in 1996 and began working for the University of Namibia's language department. An expert on language policy, she has promoted the use of Namibia's indigenous languages in education.

Prior to the 2004 election, Ndjoze-Ojo was put on the electoral list for the ruling SWAPO party. SWAPO obtained 55 seats out of 72 and she did not enter the National Assembly. She was subsequently appointed by president Hifikepunye Pohamba as deputy minister of Higher Education. She served the full term until 2010 and then became principal of the St. Paul's College, a Roman Catholic private school in Windhoek.

Ndjoze-Ojo re-entered Parliament in 2013 on the SWAPO party list.
