= Priscilla Beukes =

Namibian politician

- Citizenship: Namibian
- Occupation: Politician
- Title: Deputy Minister of Regional and Local Government, Housing and Energy Development
- Political party: SWAPO

Priscilla Beukes is a Namibian politician. A member of SWAPO, Beukes was elected to the National Assembly of Namibia in 2010. She was subsequently appointed to the cabinet as the Deputy Minister of Regional and Local Government, Housing and Energy Development, with Jerry Ekandjo heading the ministry. Beukes was previously mayor of Mariental, Hardap Region.
