= Faustina Caley =

Namibian politician

Deputy Minister of Education, Arts and Culture
- In office 2020 – 21 March 2025

Personal details
- Born: 17 November 1956 (age 69) Ruurumwe, South West Africa
- Party: SWAPO
- Education: University of Namibia; University of Hull; University of Manchester; MANCOSA
- Occupation: Social worker, teacher

Faustina Namutenya Caley (born 17 November 1956) is a Namibian politician. A member of SWAPO, Caley joined parliament in 2015 and was appointed deputy Minister of Education, Arts and Culture from 2020 to 21 March 2025.

== Early life and professional career ==
Faustina Caley was born on 17 November 1956, in Ruurumwe, Kavango West, and grew up at Sarusungu now known as Kaisosi, in Kavango East. She started her primary school in Kavango Region and finished her grade 12 at Rundu Secondary School. Caley attended Augustineum Training College and graduated with a social worker certificate in 1979. She worked as a social worker for government until 1983.

In 1990, she became acting principal of Dr Romanus Kampungu Secondary School in Rundu. From 1991 Caley worked for the Ministry of Education in various positions until 2014, rising to director of education of Otjozondjupa Region. In parallel she obtained various tertiary degrees, a diploma in Primary Education from the University of Namibia (1997), a Bachelor of Philosophy from the University of Hull, United Kingdom (1998), a Masters in Education (M.Ed) from University of Manchester (1999), and a postgraduate diploma in Management Studies from MANCOSA, South Africa (2003).

== Political career ==
Caley became a SWAPO member of the National Assembly in 2015 and served as the chairperson of the Parliamentary standing committee on ICT and Innovation. For the 2020–2025 legislative period she was appointed deputy minister of Basic Education, Arts and Culture.
