= Reinhold Nauyoma =

Namibian politician (born 1968)

Member of the National Assembly
- In office 20 March 2015 – 20 March 2020

Personal details
- Born: 8 August 1968 (age 58) Eendama, Namibia
- Education: Diploma in Personal Management, Polytechnic of Namibia

Military service
- Branch/service: People's Liberation Army of Namibia
- Years of service: 1987-1989
- Battles/wars: South African Border War

Reinhold Madala Nauyoma (born 8 August 1968) is a Namibian politician and former police officer. A member of the All People's Party, he served as a member of the National Assembly from 2015 to 2020.

== Political career ==
In 2018, Nauyoma would express concern about governmental funding cuts.
