= Annakletha Mpande Sikerete =

Namibian politician

Annakletha Mpande Sikerete is a Namibian politician who was a member of the Namibia Parliament-National Assembly for the 2015–2020 term. She was born on July 6, 1968, in Rundu, Kavango East Region.

== Education ==
Sikerete's educational background includes a Certificate in Business Management from the Business Management College, a Body Mapping Certificate obtained in 2007–2008, an HIV/AIDS Management Certificate obtained in Kampala in 2006, a Counseling and Testing Certificate obtained in 2003–2004, a Certificate in General Counseling obtained in 2002, and a Matriculation certificate obtained in 2000.

== Professional career ==
Sikerete began her career as a student representative from 1984 to 1987. She then worked as a manager at Cash Bazaar from 1989 to 2000, a regional mobilization officer from 1989 to 1994, and a branch mobilization officer in Tsumkwe from 1995 to 1998. Sikerete then went on to become a regional mobilization officer for the Swapo Party Women Council from 1998 to 2013. She served as an assistant manager at FurnMart from 2001 to 2002 and as an HIV/AIDS counsellor and tester for Lifeline/Childline from 2003 to 2005. She also worked as an assistant health worker in 2002.

Sikerete's commitment to women's empowerment led her to become the Swapo Party Regional Coordinator for Women's Council in the Kavango East Region from 2013 to 2015. She was also a member of the Central Committee from 2012 to 2017. In 2015, she was elected to the National Assembly as a member of parliament, where she served until 2020. During her tenure, she also served in the ICT parliamentary committee.

== Interests ==
Throughout her career, Sikerete has been a fierce advocate for women's rights and empowerment. Her legislative interests reflect her dedication to this cause, and she has worked tirelessly to advance the status of women in her community and beyond.
