= Sophia Swartz =

Namibian politician

MP Sophia Swartz

Member of the National Assembly of Namibia
- In office 20 March 2015 – 20 March 2020

Sophia Swartz is a Namibian politician. A member of the South West Africa People's Organization (SWAPO), she served as a member of National Assembly of Namibia from 2015 to 2020.

In 2021, Swartz would leave SWAPO in order to join the Landless People's Movement (LPM).
