= Lidwina Ndeshimona Shapwa =

Namibian legal expert and politician

Lidwina Ndeshimona Shapwa is a Namibian legal expert and politician who served Namibia in various capacities. She was born on February 7, 1962, in Outapi, Omusati region in Namibia.

== Education ==
Shapwa educational background ranges from obtaining a Master of Laws (LLM) in Maritime Law from the Maritime Law Institute in Malta, a Bachelor of Laws (LLB) with Honours from the University of Warwick in the UK, and a Diploma in Development from the same institution. She also obtained a Diploma in Development Studies from the United Nations Institute for Namibia.

== Professional career ==
Shapwa began her career in public service as a Control Officer in Maritime Affairs at the Ministry of Works, Transport, and Communications from 1992 to 1994. She then served as deputy director of Maritime Affairs from 1994 to 1998 and as Deputy Permanent Secretary from 1998 to 2000. She was then appointed as Permanent Secretary of the Ministry of Justice, where she served from 2000 to 2007. After that, she served as Permanent Secretary of the Ministry of Lands and Resettlement from 2007 to 2014.

Shapwa's dedication and hard work earned her a position in the National Assembly as Deputy Minister of Justice in 2019, where she served until 2020. She is currently serving as the National Disability Council of Namibia Board of Directors' chairperson.

Shapwa served in the National Assembly from 2015 until 2020 as a member of SWAPO.

== Interests ==
Throughout her career, Shapwa has focused on issues related to gender-based violence, vulnerable children, and poverty eradication. Her legislative interests reflect her commitment to social justice and human rights.

Shapwa's expertise in law and her passion for social justice make her an important figure in Namibian politics. She has dedicated her career to serving her country and advocating for those who are most in need. Her contributions to public service and her commitment to advancing the cause of justice have earned her widespread respect and admiration.
