= Alexia Manombe-Ncube =

Namibian politician

Honourable Alexia Manombe-Ncube

Deputy minister of Disability Affairs
- In office 21 March 2015 – 21 March 2025
- President: Hage Geingob
- Prime Minister: Saara Kuugongelwa-Amadhila
- Preceded by: Position established

Personal details
- Born: 7 December 1964 (age 61) Kalkfeld

Alexia Turimei Manombe-Ncube (born 7 December 1964) is a Namibian politician. She was the Deputy Minister of Disability Affairs from 21 March 2015 to 21 March 2025.

Manombe-Ncube was born Alexia Muningirua on 7 December 1964 in Kalkfeld, South West Africa (today the Otjozondjupa region of Namibia). She obtained a Diploma in Community-Based Social Development from Coady International Institute in Antigonish, Canada and between 1990 and 2005 she was employed at the Namibian Ministry of Health and Social Services.

Manombe-Ncube became been a non-voting SWAPO member of Parliament in 2005 when President Hifikepunye Pohamba chose her as one of his six appointees. At that time, she was the first disabled Namibian parliamentarian. In March 2015 she was appointed Deputy minister of Disability Affairs, a portfolio under the Minister of Presidential Affairs.

Manombe-Ncube obtained a B.A. in Psychology from the University of Namibia in 2020. She was married to Zimbabwean disability rights activist Jabulani Manombe-Ncube who committed suicide in 2012. She resides in Windhoek's Khomasdal suburb.
