= Paula Kooper =

Namibian politician and member of parliament

Member of the National Assembly of Namibia
- Incumbent
- Assumed office 2017

Personal details
- Born: 12 September 1977 (age 48) Windhoek, Namibia
- Party: SWAPO

Paula Alberthine Kooper (born 12 September 1977) is a Namibian politician from SWAPO. She has been a member of the Parliament of Namibia since 2017 when the President appointed her partway through the 6th National Assembly. She is the Deputy Chief Whip for her SWAPO party.

== See also ==
- List of members of the 7th National Assembly of Namibia
- List of members of the 8th National Assembly of Namibia
