= David Namwandi =

Namibian politician and academic

The Honorable David Namwandi
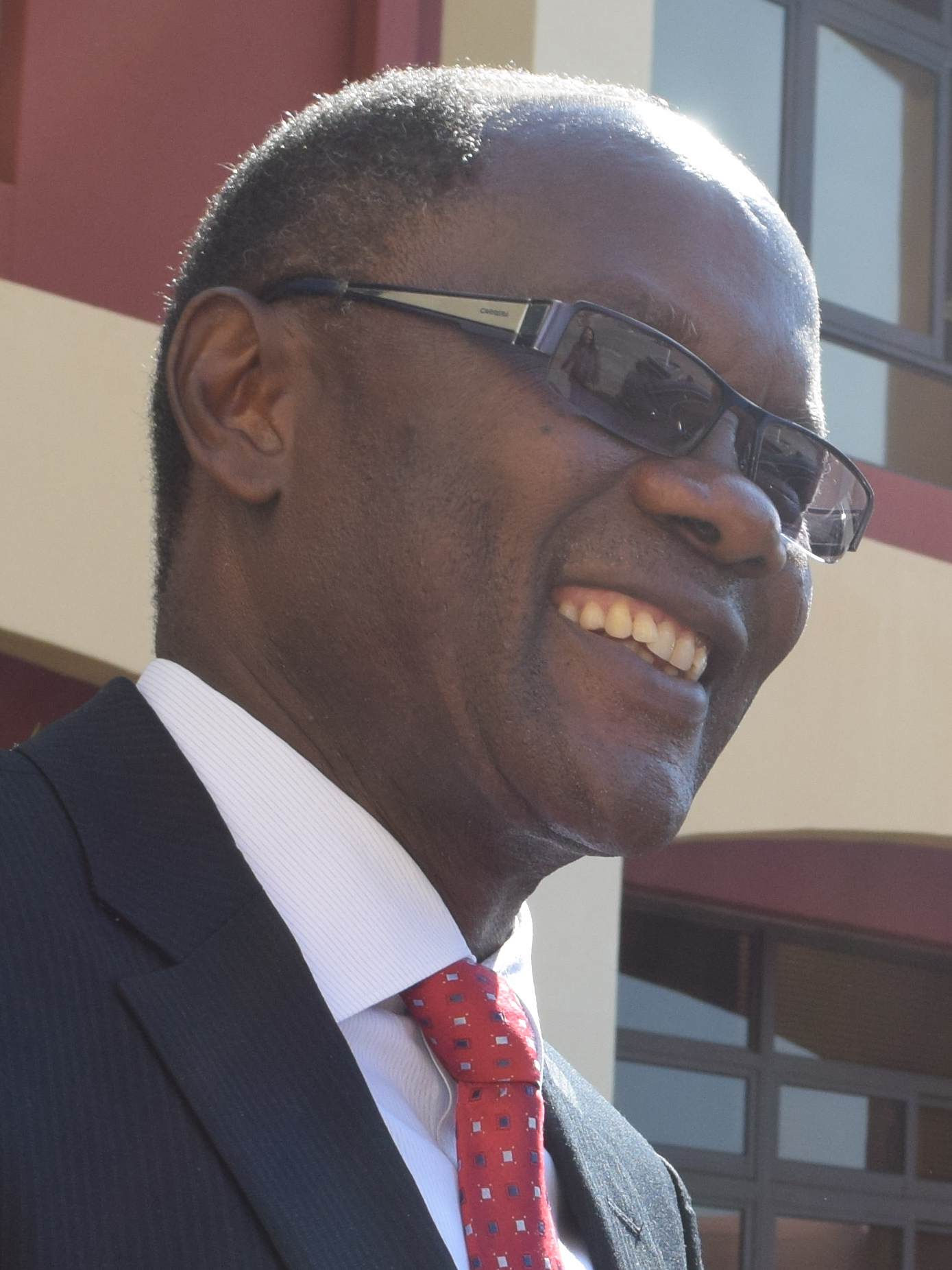
- Namwandi in 2015

Minister of Education
- In office 21 February 2013 – 21 March 2015
- President: Hifikepunye Pohamba
- Preceded by: Abraham Iyambo
- Succeeded by: Katrina Hanse-Himarwa

Deputy Minister of Education
- In office March 2010 – 20 February 2013
- President: Hifikepunye Pohamba
- Preceded by: Rebecca Ndjoze-Ojo
- Succeeded by: Silvia Makgone

Personal details
- Born: 28 February 1954 (age 72) South West Africa
- Party: SWAPO
- Occupation: Politician
- Profession: Academic

David Richard Namwandi (born February 28, 1954) is a Namibian politician and academic. He served as the Minister of Education from 2013 to 2015 and is the founder of the International University of Management (IUM).

== Biography ==
David Namwandi was born at Okapya in Ondangwa, Oshana Region, Namibia. He is a Namibian politician and academic, who served as the Minister of Education from 2013 to 2015. Namwandi previously served as Deputy Minister of Education from 2010 to 2013.

Namwandi is a seasoned Professor of Management and holds various professional and academic qualifications from Africa, Europe, and Asia including a BSc, MBA, PhD in Business Administration from Asia-e-University of Malaysia (AeU)as well as two Doctoral Awards from Malawi and Cyprus universities respectively. He authored books and published various articles in referral journals i.e. (i)“A Comparative Analysis of the Organisation and Management of the Education Systems of Namibia and Zimbabwe” (ii)“Managing Educational Institutions: Leadership and Management Models in Perspective” (iii)“Rationale for the establishment of the SADC Protocol on Education and Training and its envisaged benefits to the Region” (iv)The Crux of the Education Matter – Part 1 (v) The Crux of the Education Matter – Part 2 (vi)The Crux of the Education Matter – Part 3 Until 21 March 2010, when he was elected a member of National Assembly and appointed Deputy Minister of Education of the Republic of Namibia. He served as a member of Parliament and Minister of Education in the Republic of Namibia from 21 February 2013 until 21 March 2015. He served as a chairperson and a board member of more than 12 companies. He is a recipient of an International Award for Outstanding Contribution to Education from the Central Bank of India, in 2012. He is a recipient of an International B-School Leadership i.e. Educational Excellence Award from Le Matinal, Mauritius, 2011. He was awarded the Education Leadership Award at the World Marketing Summit in 2013, in Malaysia. He is a recipient of the Lifetime Achievement Award from the Chartered Institute of Management Accountants (CIMA) during the World Education Congress on 23 July 2015 in Mumbai, India. He is a recipient of the Namibia Business Hall of Fame Award on 17 November 2017. Until 2015 he was a Chairperson of the Namibia National Commission for UNESCO. He is the founder of the Institute of Higher Education (IHE), the forerunner of the only fully accredited private university by Namibia Qualifications Authority (NQA) in Namibia, the International University of Management (IUM) in Windhoek with over 16,000 (Sixteen Thousand) students. He served as its Chairman and Vice Chancellor until his appointment to Cabinet as Deputy Minister of Education by H.E. Hifikepunye Pohamba under a Swapo Party mandate. He is the current Chairperson of the IUM Governing Council and the Association of Private Higher Education Institutions in Namibia (APHEIN), which is a representative organization of private tertiary education and training providers in Namibia as a non-governmental network of institutions engaged in the delivery of higher education, training, research, and community outreach established under the Namibia Companies Act as a Not-for-Gain organization. In November 2022 he was honoured by Asia e University as its Distinguished Alumnus. A title awarded to respected individuals who made exceptional contributions and enhanced development to humankind internationally.

== Sources ==
=== External links ===
- Official website International University of Management
