= Veikko Nekundi =

Namibian politician (born 1977)

The Honourable Veikko Nekundi

Minister of Works and Transport
- Incumbent
- Assumed office 22 March 2025
- President: Netumbo Nandi-Ndaitwah
- Prime Minister: Elijah Ngurare
- Vice President: Lucia Witbooi
- Preceded by: John Mutorwa

Personal details
- Born: November 24, 1977 (age 48) Otshitutuma, Omusati Region, Namibia

Veikko Nekundi (born 24 November 1977) is a Namibian politician serving in the Cabinet of Namibia as Minister of Works and Transport since 22 March 2025. He has also been a legislator in the National Assembly since 2015. In 2020 was sworn in as a Member of Parliament and appointed to a deputy minister’s portfolio.

== Biography ==
Nekundi was born on 24 November 1977 in Otshitutuma, Omusati Region. He served as a youth development and training personnel at the City of Windhoek from 2005 to 2015.

In 1998, he served as President of the Student Representative Council at the then Polytechnic of Namibia. In 2013, he obtained a Master's degree in Business Administration from the University of Namibia. In addition, he holds a B-Tech in Marketing, which he obtained in 2009 and in 2008 he obtained a BBA, both from Namibia University of Science and Technology. After SWAPO Party Youth League (SPYL) Secretary-General Elijah Ngurare was expelled from the position in 2015, Nekundi acted as an interim leader of the SPYL from 2015 to 2017.

Nekundi was appointed as Minister of Works and Transport by Her Excellency President Netumbo Nandi-Ndaitwah on 22 March 2025.
