= Ephraim Nekongo =

Namibian politician and businessperson

Ephraim Tuhadeleni Nekongo (born 12 December 1982) is a Namibian politician and businessperson who served as Member of Parliament (January–March 2020) and SWAPO Party Youth League Secretary (2017–2020, 2020-current).

Nekongo was sworn in as a Member of Parliament in the National Assembly on 12 May 2022 following the resignation of Leon Jooste from the National Assembly.

== Early life and education ==
Nekongo was born in Efidilomulunga, Ongwediva, Oshana Region. He attended Valombola Vocational Training Center in Ongwediva where he obtained his Diploma in Office Administration. He has Diplomas in Business Management, Logistics, and Value Chain Management from Edubex, a Certificate in Dry Land Agriculture Economy from study in China, and a Certificate in Hotel Management.

== Business career ==
Nekongo is an enterprise farmer. In addition to his primary farming pursuits of horticulture and piggery, he also engaged in poultry, orchard production, and the relatively unexplored field of aquaculture.
