= Daniel Kashikola =

Daniel V. Kashikola
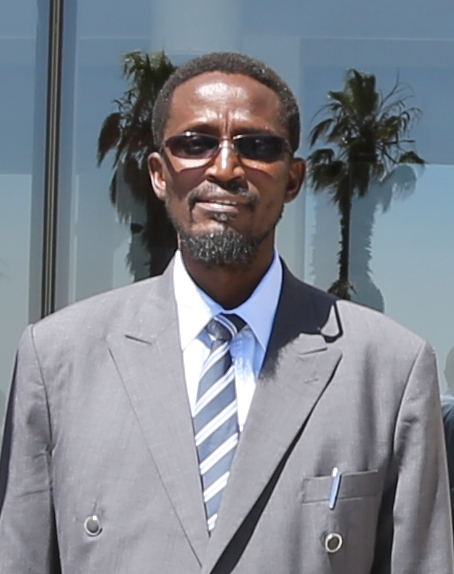

Former Deputy Minister of Ministry of Home Affairs, Immigration, Safety and Security
- Preceded by: Lucia Witbooi

Personal details
- Born: 25 July 1957 (age 69) Okawe, Ohangwena Region

Daniel V. Kashikola (born 25 July 1957) is a Namibian politician. He was the deputy minister of Home Affairs, Immigration, Safety and Security from 2020 until 2023. He also served as a member of 5th and 6th Parliament of Namibia.

== Early life and education ==
Kashikola was born on 25 July 1957 in Okawe in Ovamboland, South West Africa (today the Ohangwena Region of Namibia). He obtained several qualifications from different universities and colleges: a Diploma in Development Studies and Management at the United Nations Institute for Namibia (UNIN), Lusaka (1986). In 1992, Kahikola obtained a Diploma in Management from the College of Professional Management, United Kingdom. He also holds a Masters in Business Administration (MBA) which he obtained at Maastricht School of Management, Netherland (2006). Additionally, Kashikola obtained a PhD from the Atlantic International University (2021).

== Career ==
After independence, Kashikola served as a control officer from 1993 to 1994 before appointed as the acting regional officer for Kavango Regional Council from 1995 to 1996. Kashikola also served as the director of planning for Ohangwena Regional Council from 2004 to 2007 and the chief regional officer for Ohangwena Regional Council from 2007 to 2014.

Kashikola was elected and served as the member of Parliament of Namibia in 2015–2020, and was appointed to Cabinet as the deputy minister of Home Affairs, Immigration, Safety and Security in March 2020. He served until September 2023, when president Hage Geingob relieve him of his duties. Kashikola remains a member of the National Assembly.

== Areas of interest ==
Kashikola areas of interest lies in Land reform, Town and Regional Planning as well as Defence and security.
