= Erastus Uutoni =

Namibian politician

The Honourable Erastus A. Uutoni MP

Minister of Urban and Rural Development
- In office 21 March 2020 – 21 March 2025
- Preceded by: Peya Mushelenga

Minister of Sport, Youth and National Service
- In office 8 February 2018 – 21 March 2020
- Preceded by: Jerry Ekandjo
- Succeeded by: Agnes Tjongarero

Deputy Minister of Home Affairs and Immigration
- In office 21 March 2015 – 8 February 2018
- Preceded by: Elia Kaiyamo

Deputy Minister of Safety and Security
- In office 21 March 2010 – 20 March 2015
- Prime Minister: Nahas Angula; Hage Geingob
- Succeeded by: Daniel Kashikola

Personal details
- Born: 29 January 1961 (age 65) Omatando near Ongwediva
- Party: SWAPO
- Education: Polytechnic of Namibia
- Occupation: Politician

Erastus Amutenya Uutoni (born 29 January 1961) is a Namibian SWAPO politician who has served in the cabinet of Namibia since March 2010 to 21 March 2025

Uutoni was born on 29 January 1961 in Omatando, near Ongwediva in Ovamboland of South West Africa (today the Oshana Region of northern Namibia). After graduating from secondary school he went into exile in Angola in 1979 and received military training at Lubango. In SWAPO's military wing, the People's Liberation Army of Namibia (PLAN), re rose to Commander of the First Mechanized Infantry Brigade. In 1982 Uutoni received training in photojournalism in Lusaka, Zambia, and thereafter worked as a photographer for Namibia Today until 1991.

After the Independence of Namibia Uutoni furthered his education abroad. He completed a certificate in political science from the Institute of Political Science in Moscow in 1991 and a diploma in office Management from the College of Professional Management in the United Kingdom in 1995. In 1996 Uutoni gained university admission and completed undergraduate degrees in police science and marketing from the Polytechnic of Namibia (today the Namibia University of Science and Technology) in Windhoek.

Uutoni was elected mayor of Ongwediva in May 1998. In 2009, Uutoni was selected for the SWAPO list for the National Assembly of Namibia for the 2009 general election. He subsequently entered parliament in 2010 and immediately was appointed deputy Minister of Safety and Security in Hifikepunye Pohamba's second cabinet. In 2015 he was moved to deputise the Minister of Home Affairs and Immigration. In a cabinet reshuffle in 2018, Uutoni was promoted to minister and given the Sport, Youth, and National Service portfolio. Uutoni served in other ministerial portfolios before that. He was appointed Minister of Urban and Rural Development in March 2020 in President Hage Geingob's second-term cabinet.
