= Peya Mushelenga =

Namibian politician

Honourable Peya Mushelenga
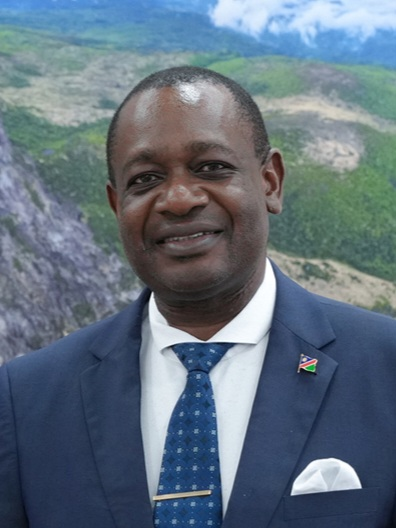

Minister of International Relations & Cooperation
- In office 9 February 2024 – 21 March 2025
- President: Nangolo Mbumba
- Preceded by: Netumbo Nandi-Ndaitwah
- Succeeded by: Selma Ashipala-Musavyi

Minister of Information and Communications Technology
- In office 21 March 2020 – 9 February 2024
- President: Hage Geingob; Nangolo Mbumba
- Preceded by: Stanley Simataa
- Succeeded by: Emma Theofelus

Minister of Urban and Rural Development
- In office 8 February 2018 – 21 March 2020
- President: Hage Geingob
- Preceded by: Sophia Shaningwa
- Succeeded by: Erastus Uutoni

Deputy minister of International Relations and Cooperation
- In office 21 March 2010 – 8 February 2018
- President: Hifikepunye Pohamba; Hage Geingob
- Succeeded by: Christine ǁHoebes

Personal details
- Born: September 1, 1975 (age 51) Oshigambo, Oshikoto Region
- Education: University of Namibia; University of South Africa; Open University of Tanzania; University of London; Eastern and Southern African Management Institute; University of the Western Cape

Samuel Abraham Peyavali "Peya" Mushelenga (born September 1, 1975, in Oshigambo, Ovamboland) is a Namibian politician and poet. He is broadly educated, holding fifteen academic qualifications from seven different universities.

A member of SWAPO, Mushelenga was a member of the National Assembly of Namibia from 2005 to 20 March 2025. He has served cabinet in several ministerial roles and last served as a Minister of International Relations and Cooperation from 9 February 2024 to 21 March 2025.

On the 24th April 2026, Mushelenga returned to the National Assembly and was sworn in as Member of Parliament following the sudden and tragic death of Honorable James Uerikua who lost his life in a car accident.

== Early life and education ==
Peya Mushelenga was born at Oshigambo in the Oshikoto Region of northern Namibia. He attended Oluno Senior Secondary School until 1992 and then entered the University of Namibia (UNAM).

Mushelenga has accumulated fifteen university degrees in his career; the New Era daily called him "Namibia's most avid scholar". He graduated with:

- BA in History and Political Studies, University of Namibia (UNAM), Namibia, 1995
- BA Honours in International Politics, University of South Africa (UNISA), 1997
- MA in International Politics, UNISA, 2009
- B Juris, UNAM, 2011
- LLB (Honours), UNAM, 2014
- D Litt et Phil in International Politics, UNISA, 2015
- BA in economics, Open University of Tanzania (OUT), 2017
- LLM, UNAM, 2017
- MBA, Eastern and Southern African Management Institute (ESAMI), 2018
- BEd (OUT), 2019
- MSc in Finance, University of London, United Kingdom, 2020
- PhD in Criminal Justice Law, University of the Western Cape, South Africa, 2022
- BTh, UNISA, 2022
- MEd (English), Great Zimbabwe University, 2023
- BTh Hons, UNISA, 2025

Mushelenga is an admitted legal practitioner (attorney) of the High Court of Namibia.

== Career ==
After his first degree at UNAM, Mushelenga worked as a teacher at Nehale Senior Secondary School in 1996. He then worked for Government until 1998, and thereafter joined NamPower.

He became active in the Namibia National Students Organisation in the 1980s and eventually became a high-level organizer for the SWAPO Party Youth League, being elected to the Central Committee and National Executive of the SPYL in 1997 and 2002. He had recently led the big delegation of 250 SWAPO Party Youth League leaders to Sochi Russia, to attend the 19th World Festival of Youth and Students, the event organized by the World Federation of Democratic Youth WFDY and the Russian government. Also in 2002, he was elected to the SWAPO Central Committee as its youngest member (re-elected in 2007 and 2012).

Mushelenga became a member of Parliament of Namibia in 2005. In 2010, he was appointed deputy minister of Foreign Affairs. In a major cabinet reshuffle he was promoted to minister of Urban and Rural Development on 8 February 2018. On 21 March 2020, Mushelenga was appointed minister of Information and Communication Technology.

== Personal life ==
In 1980, South African security forces killed Mushelenga's sister and injured other relatives during a raid on their family home in the former bantustan of Ovamboland.

A book of poetry entitled Nando Na Li Toke, written in the Ovambo dialect of Ndonga, was published by Gamsberg MacMillan in 1996.
