= Kornelia Shilunga =

Namibian politician

Honourable Kornelia Shilunga
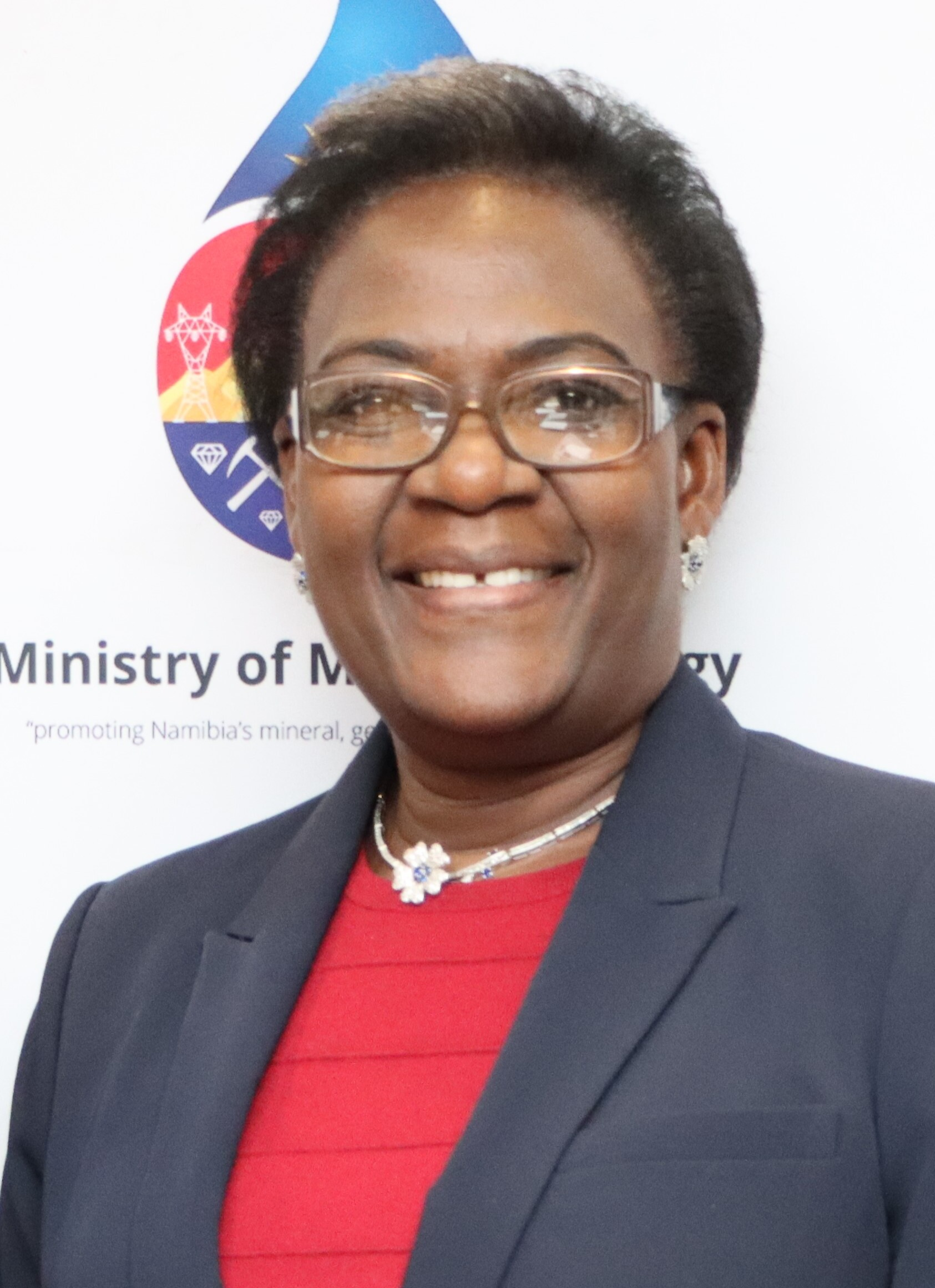

Deputy Minister of Mines and Energy
- In office 8 February 2018 – 21 March 2025
- President: Hage Geingob
- Prime Minister: Saara Kuugongelwa-Amadhila

Personal details
- Born: 25 May 1970 (age 56) Okadila, Oshana Region
- Education: University of Namibia

Kornelia Kashiimbindjola Shilunga (born 25 May 1970, in Okadila, Oshana Region) is a Namibian politician who was a member of the National Assembly from 2015 to 21 March 2025. She served as the Deputy Minister of Mines and Energy and the first woman Deputy Minister at the Ministry until 22 March 2025.

== Education ==
Shilunga holds two master's degrees, one in Business Administration from the Eastern Southern Africa Management Institute (ESAMI) and another in Public Policy and Administration from the University of Namibia (UNAM). She also has a bachelor's degree in Nursing Education and Community Health and a Diploma in Nursing Science General, Community Psychiatry, and Midwifery Sciences, also from the University of Namibia and matriculated at Gabriel Taapopi Senior Secondary School in Ongwediva in 1989. She also graduated with a Bachelor of Laws Hons from the University of Namibia in April 2023.

== Career ==
She worked at the Office of the President as a Liaison Officer for the Department of Women Affairs, where she headed two regions, respectively Oshana and Omusati Region. Hon. Shilunga has been an entrepreneur for the past nine years. She also worked for the Ministry of Gender and Child Welfare where she held the position of Chief Liaison Officer. Shilunga is an entrepreneur, a member of the Advisory Committee of Skill Share International in Namibia, a member of the Women and Child Protection Unit Committee, and a member of the Prison's Zonal Release Board in the Ministry of Safety and Security.

== Interests ==
Her interests include energy and extractive industries. She serves as the Patron of the World Energy Council Namibia, the Chairperson of the Namibian Energy Council, and the Patron of the Women in Mining Association of Namibia.
