= Anna Shiweda =

Namibian politician

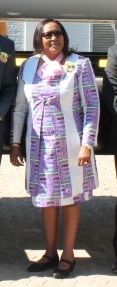
- Born: 11 June 1958 (age 67)
- Education: Master of Science degree in Agricultural Production (1984-1988) Bachelor of Science degree in Agricultural Engineering (1980-1983)
- Occupations: Deputy Minister of Agriculture, Water and Land Reform
- Years active: 2015-present
- Political party: Swapo Party of Namibia
- Spouse: Mathias Shiweda

Anna Ndahambelela Shiweda (born 11 June 1958) was a member of the Namibian legislature and served as a deputy minister of Agriculture, Water and Land reform from 2015 to 21 March 2025. She served as member of National Assembly from 2015 to 2020.

== Education ==
Shiweda is a holder of a master's degree in Agricultural Production from 1984 to 1988. She is also a holder of a Bachelor of Science in Agricultural Engineering earned from 1980 to 1983 enrollment. Shiweda attended and obtain West Africa School Certificate from 1975 to 1979 in Nigeria.

== Career ==
In the current administration of President Hage Geingob, Shiweda was appointed to serve as deputy minister of Agriculture, Water and Land reform since 2015. Under the administration of President Hifikepunye Pohamba she served for a decade as a deputy permanent secretary form 2004–2014.

== Community contribution ==
Shiweda was part of The National Stakeholders on Namibia accession's process to the convention on the protection and use of trans-boundary watercourses and international lakes which happened on 31 March 2022 in Windhoek, Namibia. She served in a purpose of improving the water supply and usage in Namibia. Shiweda was part of N$37m desalination plant for Bethanie project, where she strongly believed in "quality over quantity". she said that one need to invest into expensive and energy-consuming treatment processes known as membrane technology (desalination) to reduce the concentration of contaminants, that are said to be not good for human consumption.
