= Festus Ueitele =

Namibian politician

Festus Ueitele is a Namibian politician who has been Governor of Omaheke Region from April 2013 to April 2020. He was placed 49th on the SWAPO electoral list prior to the 2009 general election and, as SWAPO won 54 seats, he was elected to the National Assembly of Namibia. Prior to and following the 2004 general election, Ueitele was SWAPO's regional coordinator for Omaheke Region.
