= Paulus Kapia =

Namibian politician

Paulus Kapia (born 18 September 1967 in Ehafo, Oshana Region) is a Namibian politician. A member of SWAPO, Kapia was first elected to the National Assembly of Namibia in 2005. He was appointed to the politburo of SWAPO and served for a short time as Deputy Minister of Works, Transport and Communication but was forced to resign in August 2005 after being implicated in a corruption case. After SWAPO suspended all his party activities in the wake of the scandal, Kapia also lost his seats in the politburo and as member of parliament. He was, however, reinstated "on humanitarian grounds" into his SWAPO Party Youth League job in 2016.

Kapia was a member of SWAPO's military wing in exile, the People's Liberation Army of Namibia (PLAN) as a political commissar. From 1992 to 1998, Kapia was the Regional Councillor for Okatjali Constituency in the Oshana Region. In 1997, he was elected to lead the SWAPO Youth League.

Kapia was found not guilty of corruption during the party-internal investigations and resumed his activity in the National Assembly. However, he never rose to any more prominent position again, being still a backbencher in 2013.
