= Tommy Nambahu =

Namibian politician

The Honourable Tommy Nambahu

Deputy Minister of Environment and Tourism
- In office 21 March 2015 – 2018
- President: Hage Geingob
- Prime Minister: Saara Kuugongelwa

Deputy Minister of Justice
- In office 21 March 2010 – 20 March 2015
- President: Hifikepunye Pohamba
- Prime Minister: Hage Geingob

Personal details
- Born: 21 May 1960 (age 65) Oshikoto Region
- Party: SWAPO

Tommy Nambahu (born 21 May 1960) is a Namibian politician and current Deputy Minister of Environment and Tourism. A member of the South West Africa People's Organization (SWAPO), Nambahu has been a member of the National Assembly of Namibia since 2010 and was a deputy minister of Justice from 2010 to 2015. He also served as Deputy Minister of Labour, Industrial Relations & Employment Creation since February 2018.

A legal practitioner by profession, Nambahu holds a master's degree in Law.
