= Silvia Makgone =

Namibian politician and teacher

The Honourable Silvia Makgone

Deputy Minister of Urban and Rural Development
- In office 21 March 2015 – 21 March 2025
- President: Hage Geingob

Deputy Minister of Education
- In office 21 February 2013 – 20 March 2015
- President: Hifikepunye Pohamba
- Preceded by: David Namwandi

Personal details
- Born: September 6, 1963 (age 62) Aminuis, Namibia
- Party: SWAPO
- Children: 2
- Occupation: Politician
- Profession: Teacher

Silvia Gonaone Makgone (born September 6, 1963, in Aminuis) is a Namibian politician and teacher who served as a deputy minister of urban and rural development.

== Early life and education ==
Makgone holds five tertiary education degrees in education and human resources, among them a bachelor's of arts and a bachelor of education.

She worked as teacher at Mokganedi Tlhabanello Senior Secondary School in Drimiopsis in the Omaheke Region from 1987 and was promoted to principal of Mokaleng RC Combined School in 1996. She also served as principal of other schools.

== Career ==
In 2010, Makgone became a member of parliament on a SWAPO ticket.

In February 2013, after the death of Abraham Iyambo, she was appointed deputy minister of education. Makgone replaced David Namwandi who was promoted to minister.
