= Lucia Witbooi =

Vice President of Namibia since 2025

Her Excellency Lucia Witbooi

4th Vice President of Namibia
- Incumbent
- Assumed office 22 March 2025
- President: Netumbo Nandi-Ndaitwah
- Preceded by: Netumbo Nandi-Ndaitwah

Member of the National Assembly
- In office 28 November 2009 – 21 March 2025

Personal details
- Born: 21 March 1961 (age 65) Gabes, South West Africa
- Party: SWAPO
- Spouse: Adam Hendrik Witbooi
- Children: 3
- Education: University of Namibia; Azaliah College for Further and Higher Education; University of Port Elizabeth

Lucia Witbooi (born 21 March 1961) is a Namibian teacher and politician has been the 4th Vice President of Namibia since 2025. Prior to her tenure as vice president she was a member of the National Assembly from 2009 to 2025.

== Early life ==
Lucia Witbooi was born in Gabes, South West Africa, on 21 March 1961, as one of Willem Witbooi and Anna Witbooi's twelve children. Her family moved to Gibeon, Namibia, in 1967, to farm, but Lucia moved to Keetmanshoop to be educated.

Witbooi graduated from Suiderling Senior Secondary School in 1979, with a higher primary education certificate from the University of Namibia in 1996, with a diploma in education from the Azaliah College for Further and Higher Education, and a higher diploma in education from the University of Port Elizabeth in 1999. She worked as a teacher for 27 years.

== Career ==
In the 2009 election Witbooi was elected to the Parliament of Namibia as the 34th candidate on SWAPO's electoral list. In 2023, she ran for Deputy-Secretary General of SWAPO, but later withdrew.

During Witbooi's tenure in the parliament she served on the Foreign Affairs, Defence Safety and Security, and Gender and Family Affairs committees and was deputy chair of the Information and Communications Technology committee. She was the Deputy Minister of Gender Equality and Child Welfare from 2015 to 2020, and Deputy Minister of Home Affairs, Immigration, Safety and Security from 2023 to 2025.

President Netumbo Nandi-Ndaitwah appointed Witbooi as Vice President of Namibia on 22 March 2025. Her appointment made Namibia the only country in Africa with both a female president and vice president.

== Personal life ==
Witbooi married Adam Hendrik Witbooi, with whom she had three children, at age 21. She retained her maiden name as Adam had the same last name as her. Adam died in a car accident.

== Political positions ==
Witbooi has called for Germany to pay reparations for the Herero and Nama genocide.

== Works cited ==
=== News ===
- "Exactly, who is Lucia Witbooi?". New Era. 20 January 2010. Archived from the original on 31 March 2012.
- "Witbooi reiterates Namibia's commitment to genocide reparations negotiations with Germany". Informanté. 25 May 2025. Archived from the original on 24 June 2025.
- Denk, Peter (2025). "From rural teacher to Vice President". Namibian Broadcasting Corporation. Archived from the original on 24 June 2025.
- Ekanem, Solomon (24 March 2025). "Africa welcomes 18th female vice president as Lucia Witbooi is sworn in". Business Insider. Archived from the original on 24 June 2025.
- Goreses, Blanche (2023). "Swapo Party MP Lucia Witbooi withdraws from party's Deputy-Secretary General position race". Namibian Broadcasting Corporation. Archived from the original on 24 June 2025.

=== Web ===
- "Witbooi, Lucia". Parliament of Namibia. Archived from the original on 24 June 2025.
