= Evelyn ǃNawases-Taeyele =

Namibian politician (born 1976)

Evelyn ǃNawases-Taeyele (born 1 June 1976 at Leonardville in Omaheke Region) is a Namibian politician. She is a legislator in the National Assembly since 2005 and serves as deputy minister of Urban and Rural Development (Namibia). In her legislative role she is serving as a chairperson for the constitutional and legal affairs as well as an assistant whip. ǃNawases-Taeyele serving as a member of SWAPO Party central committee.
