= Saara Kuugongelwa =

Prime Minister of Namibia from 2015 to 2025

The Honourable Saara Kuugongelwa-Amadhila MP
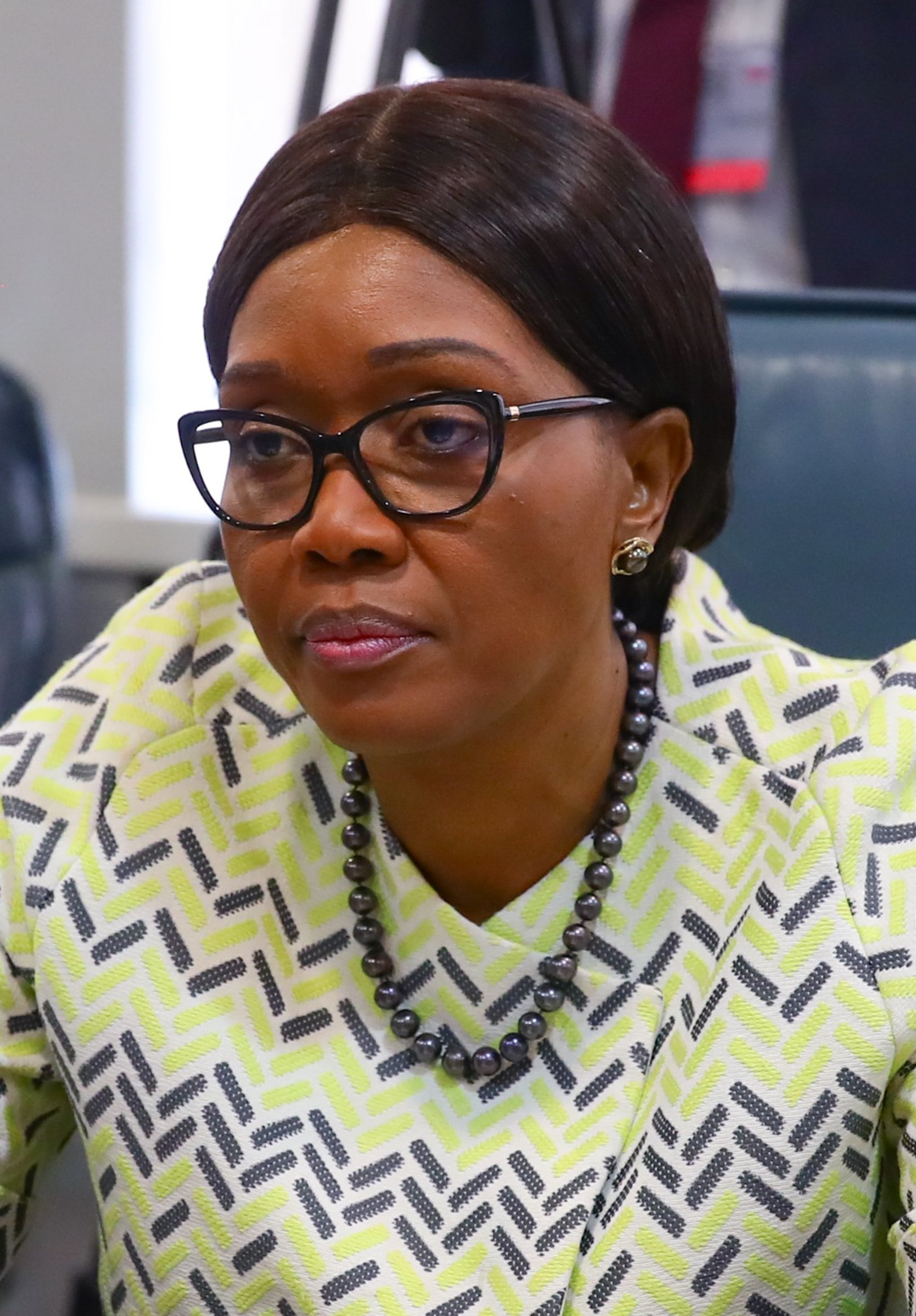
- Kuugongelwa-Amadhila in 2020

Speaker of the National Assembly
- Incumbent
- Assumed office 21 March 2025
- President: Netumbo Nandi-Ndaitwah
- Preceded by: Peter Katjavivi

Prime Minister of Namibia
- In office 21 March 2015 – 21 March 2025
- President: Hage Geingob; Nangolo Mbumba
- Deputy: Netumbo Nandi-Ndaitwah (2015–2024); John Mutorwa (2024–2025)
- Preceded by: Hage Geingob
- Succeeded by: Elijah Ngurare

Minister of Finance
- In office 2003 – 21 March 2015
- President: Sam Nujoma; Hifikepunye Pohamba
- Preceded by: Nangolo Mbumba
- Succeeded by: Calle Schlettwein

Director General of the National Planning Commission of Namibia
- In office 1995–2003
- President: Sam Nujoma
- Succeeded by: Immanuel Ngatjizeko

Member of the National Assembly of Namibia
- Incumbent
- Assumed office 1995

Personal details
- Born: 12 October 1967 (age 58) Otamanzi, South West Africa (now Namibia)
- Party: SWAPO
- Education: Lincoln University
- Occupation: Politician

Saara Kuugongelwa-Amadhila (born 12 October 1967) is a Namibian politician serving as the Speaker of the National Assembly of Namibia since 21 March 2025. She served as the Prime Minister of Namibia from 2015 to 2025. She is a member of the South West Africa People's Organization (SWAPO) and has been a member of the National Assembly of Namibia since 1995. She served as Minister of Finance from 2003 to 2015. She is the first woman to serve as Prime Minister of Namibia.

Kuugongelwa-Amadhila holds an Hon. Doctorate in Public Finance and an MSc in Financial Economics. She was an economist at the Office of the President in 1995 and Director General of the National Planning Commission from 1995 to 2003.

On 21 March 2025, Kuugongelwa-Amadhila was elected as Speaker of the National Assembly of Namibia for five years and she is the first woman to lead Namibia's parliament.

== Early life and education ==
Saara Kuugongelwa was born on 12 October 1967 in Otamanzi, South West Africa (present-day Namibia) as the youngest of five children. Her father, Fillemon Kuugongelwa, was a contract labourer at Oranjemund who died when she was nine years old, while her mother, Alina Shikongo, was a school principal who died by the time Saara reached the age of 12. She went into exile with SWAPO in 1980 at the age of 13 and left for Sierra Leone in 1982 at the age of 15. She attended Koidu Girls Secondary School from 1982 to 1984 and Saint Joseph's Secondary School from 1984 to 1987. From 1991 to 1994, she attended Lincoln University in Pennsylvania, United States, where she graduated with an MSc in financial economics.

== Political career ==
Kuugongelwa-Amadhila returned to Namibia following her graduation from Lincoln University and took a position as an economist in the Office of the President under Sam Nujoma. In 1995, after only a few months in the job, Nujoma appointed her to parliament at the age of 27 and made her director general of the National Planning Commission, a position in the rank of a minister. In 2003, Nujoma promoted her to Minister of Finance.

Alongside President Hage Geingob, she was sworn in as the 4th Prime Minister of Namibia on 21 March 2015. She is the first woman to hold the position.

In May 2016, she took part in "A Conversation with Saara Kuugongelwa-Amadhila, Prime Minister of the Republic of Namibia," a moderated discussion with Wilson Center's Women in Public Service Project, the Wilson Center Africa Program, and the Constituency for Africa. She has spoken about gender equality on numerous occasions, including during Malian Prime Minister Modibo Keita's visit and in a speech (read by Christine Hoebes on her behalf) at the 10th Namibian Women's Summit, where she stated that it would take 70 years to close the gender pay gap across Africa.

Kuugongelwa-Amadhila contested the leadership of SWAPO in the party's 2022 congress but lost to Netumbo Nandi-Ndaitwah, who went on to become its presidential candidate in the 2024 Namibian general election. On 21 March 2025, Kuugongelwa-Amadhila was elected as the first female speaker of the Parliament of Namibia, winning 55 votes against Landless People’s Movement leader Bernadus Swartbooi, who received 40 votes.

== Personal life ==
Kuugongelwa is married to businessman Onesmus Tobias Amadhila.

== Awards and recognition ==
On Heroes' Day 2014, she was conferred the Most Brilliant Order of the Sun, Second Class.

Political offices
Preceded by Nangolo Mbumba	Minister of Finance; 2003–2015	Succeeded by Calle Schlettwein
Preceded by Hage Geingob	Prime Minister of Namibia; 2015–2025	Succeeded by Elijah Ngurare
