= SWAPO =

Political party in Namibia

SWAPO Party of Namibia South West Africa People's Organisation
- Abbreviation: SWAPO
- President: Netumbo Nandi-Ndaitwah
- Vice-President: Lucia Witbooi
- Secretary-General: Sophia Shaningwa
- Vice Secretary-General: Nangolo Mbumba
- Founders: Sam Nujoma; Mburumba Kerina; Andimba Toivo Ya Toivo; Jacob Kuhangua; Solomon Mifima; Paul Helmuth; Andreas Shipanga; Erasmus Erastus Mbumba; Emil Appolus; Maxton Joseph Mutongulume; Carlos Hamatu
- Founded: 19 April 1960 (66 years, 214 days)
- Preceded by: Ovamboland People's Organization (OPO)
- Headquarters: Erf 2464; Hans-Dietrich Genscher Street; Katutura; Windhoek; Khomas Region
- Newspaper: Namibia Today (1960–2015)
- Youth wing: SWAPO Party Youth League
- Armed wing: People's Liberation Army of Namibia (1962–1990)
- Ideology: 2017-Present: Socialism with Namibian characteristics 1990-2017: Social democracy Statism; 1960-1990: Communism; Marxism–Leninism; Scientific socialism Anti-colonialism
- Political position: Centre-left to left-wing Historical; Left-wing to far-left
- International affiliation: Non-Aligned Movement (until 1990); Socialist International (since the 1970s)
- African affiliation: Former Liberation Movements of Southern Africa
- Colours: Red (primary); Blue, Green (secondary)
- National Assembly: 51 / 104
- National Council: 28 / 42
- Regional Councils: 88 / 121
- Local Councils: 277 / 378
- Pan-African Parliament: 4 / 5

Party flag

Website
- www.swapo.party

The South West Africa People's Organisation (SWAPO /ˈswɑːpoʊ/; Afrikaans: Suidwes-Afrikaanse Volks Organisasie, SWAVO; German: Südwestafrikanische Volksorganisation, SWAVO), officially known as the SWAPO Party of Namibia, is a political party and former independence movement in Namibia (formerly South West Africa). Founded in 1960, it has been the governing party in Namibia since the country achieved independence in 1990. The party continues to be dominated in number and influence by the Ovambo ethnic group.

SWAPO held a two-thirds majority in parliament from 1994 to 2019. In the general election held in November 2019, the party won 65.5% of the popular vote and 63 out of the 104 seats in the National Assembly. It also holds 28 out of the 42 seats in the National Council. From November 2017 until his death in February 2024, Namibian President Hage Geingob remained the president of SWAPO after being elected to the position at the party's electoral congress.

== History ==
=== Background and foundation ===
German South West Africa was established in 1884. After World War I, the League of Nations gave South West Africa, formerly a German colony, to the United Kingdom as a mandate under the administration of South Africa. When the National Party won the 1948 election in South Africa and subsequently introduced apartheid legislation, these laws were also applied to South West Africa which was considered the de facto fifth province of South Africa.

SWAPO was founded on 19 April 1960 as the successor of the Ovamboland People's Organization. Leaders renamed the party to show that it represented all Namibians. But, the organisation had its base among the Ovambo people of northern Namibia, who constituted nearly half the total population.

=== Struggle for independence ===
During 1962, SWAPO had emerged as the dominant nationalist organisation for the Namibian people. It co-opted other groups such as the South West Africa National Union (SWANU), and later in 1976 the Namibia African People's Democratic Organisation. SWAPO used guerrilla tactics to fight the South African Defence Force. On 26 August 1966, the first major clash of the conflict took place, when a unit of the South African Police, supported by the South African Air Force, exchanged fire with SWAPO forces. This date is generally regarded as the start of what became known in South Africa as the Border War.

One important factor in the fight for independence was the 1971-72 Namibian contract workers strike, which fought for the elimination of the contract labour system and independence from South Africa. An underlying goal was the promotion of independence under SWAPO leadership.

In 1973, the United Nations General Assembly recognised SWAPO as the 'sole legitimate representative' of Namibia's people. The Norwegian government began giving aid directly to SWAPO in 1974.

The country of Angola gained its independence on 11 November 1975 following its war for independence. The leftist Popular Movement for the Liberation of Angola (MPLA), supported by Cuba and the Soviet Union, came to power. In March 1976, the MPLA offered SWAPO bases in Angola for launching attacks against the South African military.

=== Independent Namibia ===
When Namibia gained its independence in 1990, SWAPO became the dominant political party. Though the organisation rejected the term South West Africa and preferred to use Namibia, the organisation's original name—derived from the territory's old name—was too deeply rooted in the independence movement to be changed. However, the original full name is no longer used; only the acronym remains. SWAPO, and with it much of Namibia's government and administration, continues to be dominated by the Ovambo ethnic group, despite "considerable efforts to counter [that] perception".

SWAPO president Sam Nujoma was declared Namibia's first President after SWAPO won the inaugural election in 1989. A decade later, Nujoma had the constitution changed so he could run for a third term in 1999, as it limits the presidency to two terms.

In 2004, the SWAPO presidential candidate was Hifikepunye Pohamba, described as Nujoma's hand-picked successor. In 2014, the SWAPO presidential candidate was Hage Geingob, who was the vice-president of SWAPO. In 2019 presidential election, president Geingob won his second five-year term as Namibian president.

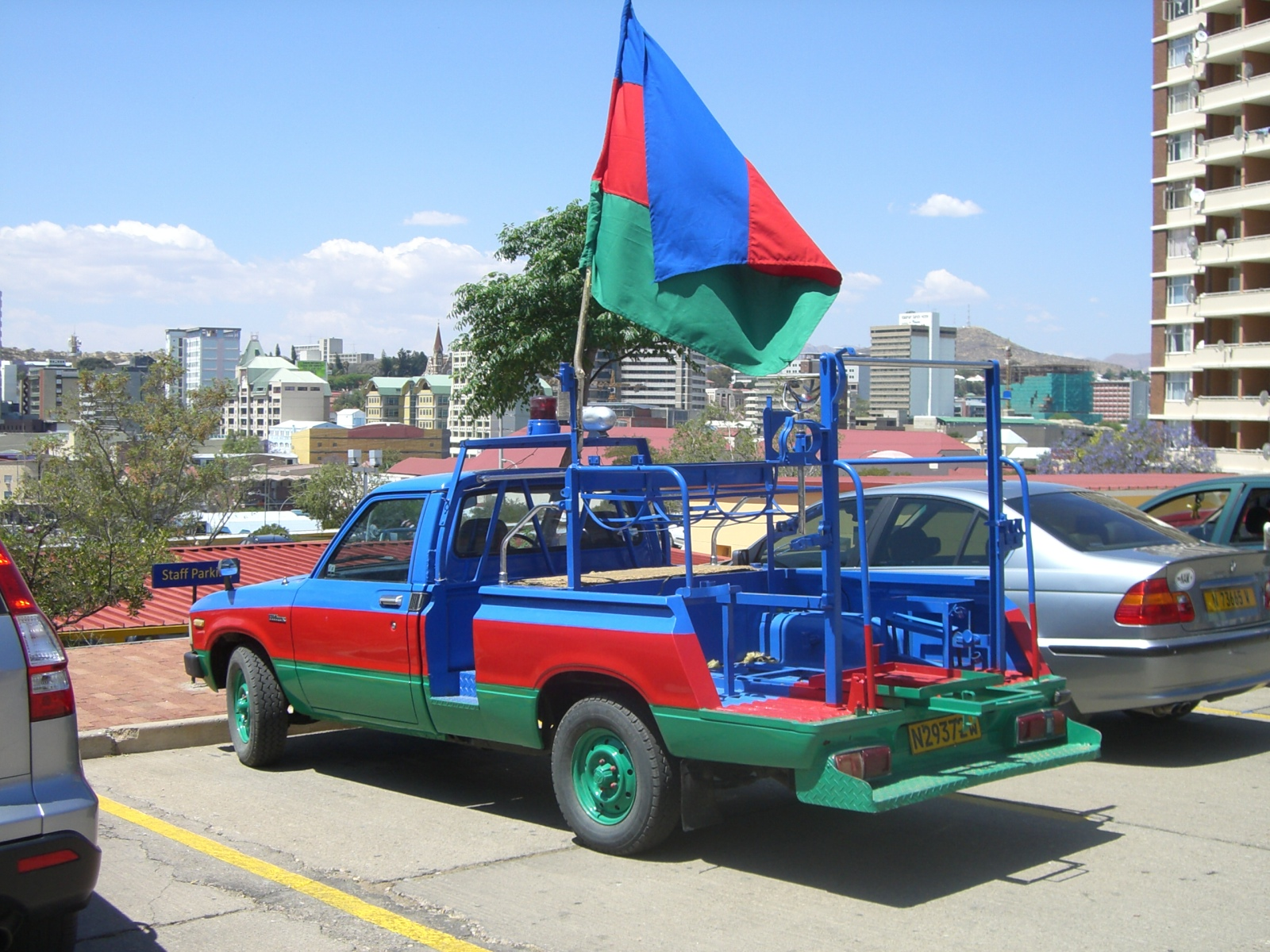
SWAPO election campaign vehicle

== Ideology ==
SWAPO was founded with the aim of attaining the independence of Namibia and therefore is part of the African nationalist movement. Pre-independence it had a socialist, Marxist–Leninist ideology, which was not immediately abandoned when independence was achieved in 1990 and SWAPO became the ruling party. SWAPO's 1989 manifesto called for a "just and equitable society", and in 1998, its stated goal was to "bring change in ownership relations, bring about equitable distribution of national income, create rational linkages of sectors and diversify the economy". The party has since been described as centre-left, and left-wing.

Various commentators have characterised the politics of SWAPO in different ways. In 2007, Gerhard Tötemeyer, himself a party member, considered its post-independence politics neoliberal and social democratic. Since 2017, the party has adopted "Socialism with Namibian Characteristics" as its ideology, based on the Chinese Communist Party (CCP) concept of socialist market economy. In 2024, the Rosa Luxemburg Foundation wrote that while SWAPO used to be socialist and had a strong left-wing orientation, its governance has become more centrist in the 21st century, although the party retains "leftist rhetoric, particularly in areas of social welfare and addressing historical injustices". In 2022, the Konrad Adenauer Foundation wrote that SWAPO advocates "a mixed economy where all basic industries are publicly owned", fighting wealth inequality, and redistributing wealth from the rich to the poor.

In 2024, Table Media described the SWAPO's alignment as one of 'socialism with Namibian characteristics', which is closely based on the CCP's 'socialism with Chinese characteristics.' SWAPO's alliance with China resulted in "quasi-monopoly of Chinese companies in the awarding of government contracts for public works". SWAPO has adopted a "Go East" policy, and in response to criticisms of its close alignment with China, the party's longtime leader, Sam Nujoma, stated "that people who complain about the Chinese are narrow-minded, as they do not appreciate the role played by Chinese, in the course of Namibia’s liberation struggle."

=== Recent developments ===
Since 1998, the party gradually adopted more radical policies and language. It aligned closely with China and the Russian Federation, and joined both countries in condemning NATO bombing of Yugoslavia, and "on several occasions took positions in defence of the Milošević regime". The party declared its support for Milošević as "an act of solidarity with the weak on the side of justice", and included it in its 1999 manifesto. In 2007, the party adopted One China policy. In 2011, SWAPO condemned the 2011 military intervention in Libya as imperialist and a regime change imposed by foreign forces. The party declared that the intervention was a "crime against humanity" and "reminiscent of the infamous Berlin Conference of 1884/1885, when Africa was carved up by imperial powers".

In its 2012 policy conference, the party declared land reform a priority, attacking white farmers and accusing them of sabotaging redistribution process by being unwilling to sell their land. According to German political scientist Henning Melber, the party leadership was then under "radical pressure" to take more coercive measures towards land redistribution, which the party approved of in November 2012 by revising its land policy. The electoral congress in 2017 approved the official change of the "party’s political ideology from capitalism to socialism", and declared socialism with a "Namibian character" the party's ideology.

==== Socialism with Namibian Characteristics ====
The party's new ideology adopted in 2017, Socialism with Namibian Characteristics, is explicitly based on the concept of socialist market economy of CCP. SWAPO declares that it wishes to follow China in combining socialist principles with market economy and to allow the private sector to gain importance alongside the public one. Hage Geingob and Netumbo Nandi-Ndaitwah, both leading SWAPO members, argued that this policy has been necessary ever since the collapse of the Soviet Union, which forces Namibia to recognize private property rights and permit foreign companies to own the means of production.

According to Geingob and Nandi-Ndaitwah, Socialism with Namibian Characteristics "would allow the community and the government rather than the individuals to own and manage propriety and resources on behalf of all" and is a kind of socialism "underpinned by the principles of social justice, economic inclusion, shared prosperity and responsibility in which the state plays a significant role through the ownership of the means of production". Uazava Kaumbi, a party member, declared that the adoption of this ideology marks SWAPO returning to its "ideological home", and that it represents a form of socialism that is possible in the material conditions of Namibia.

Arianna Pasqualini of the University of Bologna has stated that while SWAPO's commitment to socialism has always been pragmatic, "socialism has to some extent been a model for the revolution in Namibia, to the point that it is still influencing the SWAPO party today." Pasqualini notes that SWAPO is a member of the Socialist International and that "socialist elements continue to be present in SWAPO", as the party considers socialism a path for Namibia. Some SWAPO members have argued that "present-day Namibia has socialist elements because of the importance of social services and its mixed economy".

=== Foreign policy ===
Henning Melber has argued that the relationship between China and SWAPO has "exceeded the ordinary friendly diplomatic relations", as China makes financial donations to SWAPO and translates party's publications into Chinese. The party has also aligned with Russia. In 2024, SWAPO supported Russia's foundation of the Forum of Supporters of the Fight against Modern Practices of Neocolonialism. In 2026, the Russian Ministry of Foreign Affairs has declared that United Russia and SWAPO "are cooperating to counter all forms of colonialism and neocolonialism, which the West is trying to revive." SWAPO has also been described as nationalist, and already heavily mixed Namibian nationalism with Marxism-Leninism as a guerilla movement.

China has been providing training programs for high-level cadres of SWAPO, and has been awarding Chinese university scholarship to the members of SWAPO and their families; such scholarships were awarded to the children of the Namibian President, Defence Minister, the Namibian Police Inspector General, The Deputy Minister of Mines and Energy, and Deputy Minister of Lands and Resettlement, Minister of Mines and Energy, Minister of Home Affairs, and Minister of Justice. China also proposed building a joint party school in Africa with SWAPO and other left-wing parties in Africa such as ANC, CCM, ZANU-PF, FRELIMO and MPLA; China has also been providing SWAPO with computers and advisors. Justifying its alliance with China, SWAPO has argued that Chinese presence in Namibian economy is "important in loosening the West’s economic stronghold in the country" and that "negative criticism of China is being driven by the West".

=== Social policy ===
The party opposes same-sex marriage. It condemned the Namibia's Supreme Court order to recognise two same-sex marriages concluded outside the country; SWAPO declared that same-sex marriage is a part of "agenda of cultural imperialism by foreign entities", and blamed the ruling on a “homosexuality agenda” in Namibian education system. The party defied the Supreme Court order by passing a Marriage Bill which prohibited same-sex marriage and restricted homosexuality. The bill was criticized by foreign media as homophobic.

SWAPO also opposes homosexuality, describing it as “un-African”, a Western import, and arguing that it has "no place in post-colonial Africa". Henning Melber wrote that the party utilizes "gay-bashing", as one of the party's founders and Namibian presidents, Sam Nujoma, has accused the party's political opponents of being homosexual and thus "pawns" of white people "who betrayed Namibian interests". Its approach to LGBT issues has thus been described as conservative.

The party's leader since 2023 and the president of Namibia since 2024, Netumbo Nandi-Ndaitwah, has been described as socially conservative by eNCA. She opposes abortion and same-sex marriage, and her views were described as reflecting that of the party. SWAPO implemented and maintains a restrictive law on abortion, prohibiting it except for exceptional circumstances. In 2014, the party introduced a 50/50 "zebra list" policy, a gender parity mechanism mandating an equal split of male and female candidates on its electoral lists.

== Structure ==
The party president is the top position of SWAPO; in 2012 this was held by Namibia's former president Pohamba. The vice-president was Namibia's former president Hage Geingob, who was elected to that position in 2007 and reconfirmed at the SWAPO congress in December 2012, until his death on 4 February 2024. The third highest position in SWAPO is the secretary-general, a position held in December 2012 by Nangolo Mbumba. Number four is the deputy secretary-general, Omaheke governor Laura McLeod-Katjirua.

Like many socialist and communist parties, SWAPO is governed by a politburo and a central committee. The party leadership is advised by a youth league, a women's council, and an elders' council.

=== Politburo ===
The politburo of SWAPO is a body that currently consists of 29 members for the period 2022–2027 (including party president, former party president, secretary general, deputy secretary general, members appointed by the party president and members elected by the SWAPO central committee for the period).

- Netumbo Nandi-Ndaitwah
- Sophia Shaningwa
- Uahekua Herunga
- Pohamba Shifeta
- Lucia Witbooi
- Frans Kapofi
- Sirkka Ausiku
- Charles Mubita
- Lucia Iipumbu
- Iipumbu Shiimi
- Bernadette Jagger
- Modestus Amutse
- Laura McLeod-Katjirua
- Veikko Nekundi
- Kornelia Shilunga
- Royal ǀUiǀoǀoo
- Saara Kuugongelwa
- Edward Wambo
- Verna Sinimbo
- Elia Kaiyamo
- Hilma Nicanor
- Hofni Iipinge
- Paula Kooper
- Erastus Uutoni
- Anna Nghipondoka
- Alpheus ǃNaruseb
- Maria Elago
- Steve Sensus Ovambo
- Katrina Hanse-Himarwa
- Sisa Namandje

=== Central Committee ===
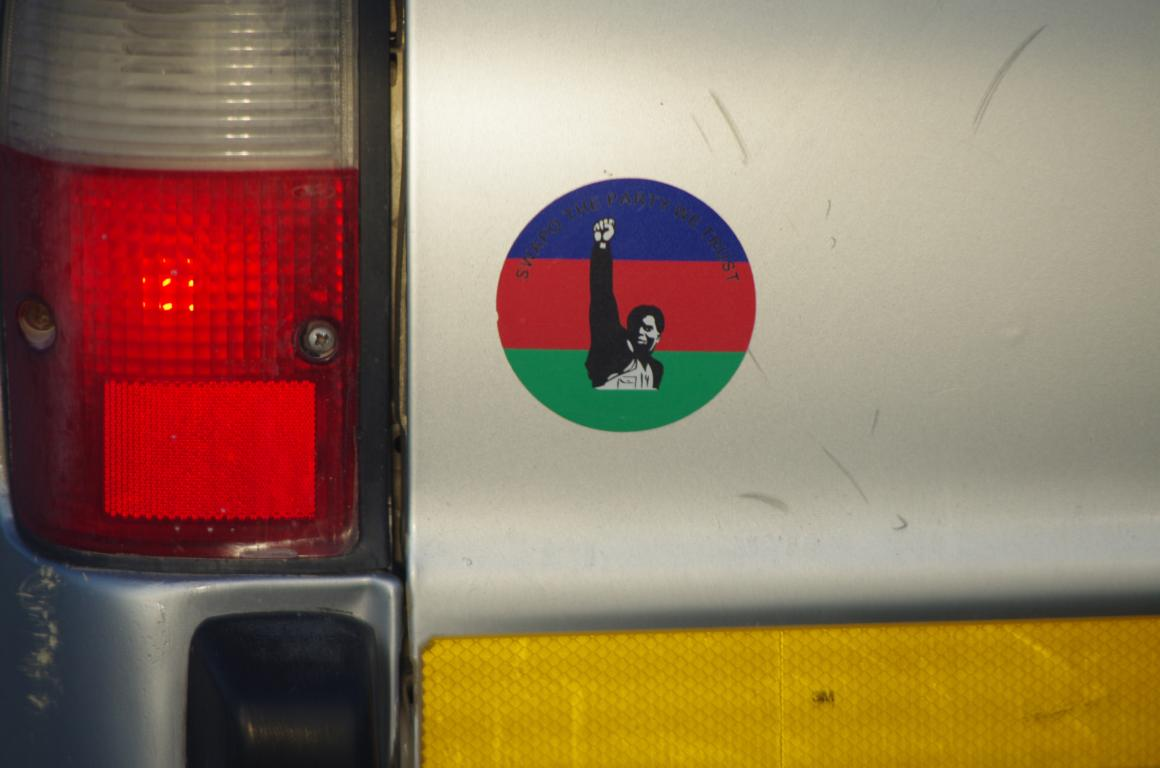
Typical SWAPO sticker on Namibian vehicle

SWAPO's Central Committee consists of:

- The president
- The vice-president
- The secretary-general
- The deputy secretary-general
- The founding president of SWAPO as a permanent member
- 13 SWAPO Party regional coordinators
- 54 members elected at the party congress
- 10 members appointed by the party president

The current 100 Central Committee members are:

- Netumbo Nandi-Ndaitwah
- Sophia Shaningwa
- Uahekua Herunga
- Lucia Witbooi
- Iipumbu Shiimi
- Loide Kasingo
- John Mutorwa
- Lucia Iipumbu
- Charles Mubita
- Sirkka Ausiku
- Frans Kapofi
- Bernadette Jagger
- Veikko Nekundi
- Tuulikki Abraham
- Nangolo Mbumba
- Christine Haindaka
- Alpheus ǃNaruseb
- Hilma Nicanor
- Willem Amutenya
- Saara Kuugongelwa-Amadhila
- Bonifatius Wakudumo
- Ester Kavela
- Pohamba Shifeta
- Petrina Haingura
- Neville Andre
- Verna Sinimbo
- Modestus Amutse
- Maria Elago
- Royal ǀUiǀoǀoo
- Anna Nghipondoka
- Tobie Aupindi
- Paula Kooper
- Edward Wambo
- Loise Garosas
- Peya Mushelenga
- Evelyn ǃNawases-Taeyele
- Austin Samupwa
- Kornelia Shilunga
- Festus Ueitele
- Naemi Amuthenu
- John Likando
- Hilma lita
- Usko Nghaamwa
- Jenelly Matundu
- Tjekero Tweya
- Gaudentia Krohne
- Sebastian Karupu
- Fenni Nanyeni
- Tommy Nambahu
- Pendukeni Iivula-Ithana
- John Elago
- Katrina Liswani
- Elia Kaiyamo
- Silvia Makgone
- Utoni Nujoma
- Nono Katjingisiua
- Salomon April
- Easter Mokaxwa
- Steve Sensus Ovambo
- Laura McLeod-Katjirua
- Samuel Mbambo
- Martha Namundjebo-Tilahun
- Hofni lipinge
- Katrina Hanse-Himarwa
- Erastus Uutoni
- Coleen van Wyk
- Obed Kandjoze
- Sirkka Kapanga
- Paulus Kapia
- Emma Kantema-Gaomas
- Marius Sheya
- Lempy Lucas
- Erginus Endjala
- Laurencia Stephanus
- Martin Shalli
- Marlyn Mbakera
- Sisa Namandje
- Sharonice Busch
- James Uerikua
- Ephraim Tuhadeleni Nekongo
- Fransina Kahungu
- Muwaita Shanyengana
- Phillemon Josua
- Ottilie Shinduvi
- Armas Amukwiyu
- Moffat Sileze
- Daniel Utapi Muhuura
- Immanuel Namaseb
- Joplin Gontes
- Mathew Mumbala
- Elliot Mbako
- Julius Kaujova
- Sackey Kayone
- Werner Iita
- David Hamutenya
- Ruth Kaukuata-Mbura
- Petrus Nevonga
- Loide Shaanika
- Bamba Nghipandua
- Taimi Ileka

=== List of presidents ===
- Sam Nujoma (1960–2007)
- Hifikepunye Pohamba (2007–2015)
- Hage Geingob (2015–2024)

== Finances and business interests ==
Although SWAPO receives finances from government for its operations, the party also holds extensive business interests. Through Kalahari Holdings, it entered into joint ventures with several companies, most prominently the Namibian branch of MultiChoice, a private satellite TV provider, of which it owns 51%. Kalahari Holdings has further joint ventures with Radio Energy, Africa Online, and businesses in the tourism, farming, security services and health insurance sectors. It owns Namib Contract Haulage, Namprint, Kudu Investments and the Ndilimani Cultural Troupe.

SWAPO also runs Guinas Investments (Pty) Ltd, which owns 96.5% of Gendev Fishing Resources (Pty) Ltd. The latter in turn owns 60% of the Gendev Fishing Group joint venture. Former Minister of Fisheries and Marine Resources Helmut Angula, himself running a fishing company, described SWAPO's business structure as "deliberately structured to be complex, multi-layered and opaque".

Namibia Today was the mouthpiece of the SWAPO, and Asser Ntinda was its editor. The paper does not appear to have been active since 7 April 2011 and closed down in 2015.

== Human rights abuses ==
Various groups have claimed that SWAPO committed serious human rights abuses against suspected spies during the independence struggle. Since the early 21st century, they have pressed the government more strongly on this issue. Breaking the Wall of Silence (BWS) is one of the groups founded by people who were detained by SWAPO during the war and abused during interrogations. In 2004, BWS alleged that "In exile, hundreds of SWAPO dependants and members were detained, tortured and killed without trial." SWAPO denies serious infractions and claims anything that did happen was in the name of liberation. Because of a series of successful South African raids, the SWAPO leadership believed that spies existed in the movement. Hundreds of SWAPO cadres were imprisoned, tortured and interrogated.

== Memberships ==
SWAPO is a full member of Socialist International. It was a member of the Non-Aligned Movement before the independence of Namibia in 1990.

== Electoral history ==
=== Presidential elections ===
Election	Party candidate	Votes	%	Result
1994	Sam Nujoma	370,452	76.34%	Elected ✓
1999	Sam Nujoma	414,096	76.82%	Elected ✓
2004	Hifikepunye Pohamba	625,605	76.45%	Elected ✓
2009	Hifikepunye Pohamba	611,241	75.25%	Elected ✓
2014	Hage Geingob	772,528	86.73%	Elected ✓
2019	Hage Geingob	464,703	56.3%	Elected ✓
2024	Netumbo Nandi-Ndaitwah	683,560	58.07%	Elected ✓

=== National Assembly elections ===
Election	Party leader	Votes	%	Seats	+/–	Position	Result
1989	Sam Nujoma	384,567	57.33%	41 / 72	New	▲1st	Majority government
1994	Sam Nujoma	370,452	76.34%	53 / 72	▲12	1st	Supermajority government
1999	Sam Nujoma	414,096	76.82%	55 / 78	▲2	1st	Supermajority government
2004	Sam Nujoma	625,605	76.44%	55 / 78	0	1st	Supermajority government
2009	Hifikepunye Pohamba	611,241	75.25%	54 / 72	▼1	1st	Supermajority government
2014	Hifikepunye Pohamba	785,671	80.01%	77 / 96	▲23	1st	Supermajority government
2019	Hage Geingob	536,861	65.45%	63 / 96	▼14	1st	Majority government
2024	Netumbo Nandi-Ndaitwah	583,300	53.38%	51 / 96	▼12	1st	Majority government

=== National Council elections ===
Election	Seats	+/–	Position	Result
1992	19 / 26	New	▲1st	Governing supermajority
1998	21 / 26	▲2	1st	Governing supermajority
2004	24 / 26	▲3	1st	Governing supermajority
2010	24 / 26	Steady	1st	Governing supermajority
2015	40 / 42	▲16	1st	Governing supermajority
2020	28 / 42	▼12	1st	Governing supermajority

== See also ==
- Ovamboland People's Organization
- People's Liberation Army of Namibia
- South West Africa National Union
- Caprivi African National Union
- Democratic Turnhalle Alliance
- Namibia African People's Democratic Organisation
- Popular Movement for the Liberation of Angola
- South African Border War
- SWAPO Democrats
- SWAPO for Justice
- 1971–72 Namibian contract workers strike
- Namibian Czechs
