= Economy of Namibia =

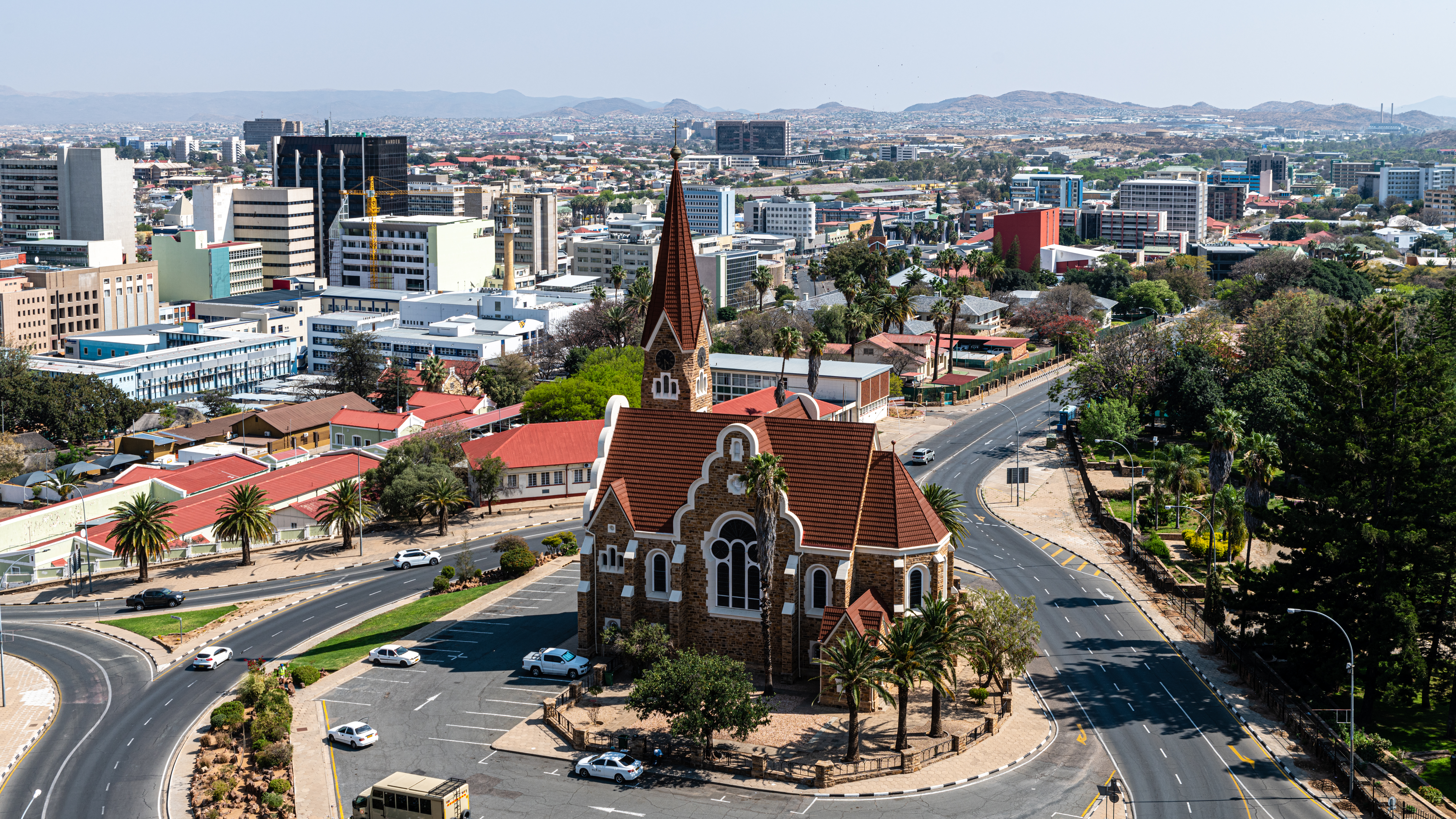
- Windhoek, the capital and economic centre of Namibia
- Currency: Namibian dollar (NAD); South African rand (ZAR)
- Fixed exchange rates: 1 NAD = 1 ZAR
- Fiscal year: 1 April – 31 March
- Trade organisations: AU, AfCFTA, WTO, SADC, SACU
- Country group: Developing/Emerging; Lower-middle income economy

Statistics
- Population: ▲3,022,401 (2023)
- GDP: ▲$14.69 billion (nominal; 2025); ▲$37.63 billion (PPP; 2025)
- GDP rank: 144th (nominal; 2025); 144th (PPP; 2025)
- GDP growth: 3.7% (2024); 3.8% (2025)
- GDP per capita: ▲$4,413 (nominal; 2025); ▲$12,341 (PPP; 2025)
- GDP per capita rank: 119th (nominal; 2025); 117th (PPP; 2025)
- GDP per capita growth: 1.4% (2024)
- GDP by sector: GDP shares (2024): Primary sector: 20.6%; Secondary sector: 15.9%; Tertiary sector: 63.5%
- Inflation (CPI): ▼3.5% (2025)
- Gini coefficient: 59.1 high (2015, World Bank)
- Human Development Index: ▲0.665 medium (2023) (136th); ▲0.438 low IHDI (2023)
- Labour force: ▼867,247 (strict, 2023); ▲1,209,178 (broad, 2023)*
- Unemployment: ▲36.9% (strict, 2023); ▲54.8% (broad, 2023)
- Main industries: Financial services; wholesale and retail trade; manufacturing (alcoholic and non-alcoholic beverages, grain mill products, meat processing, fish processing, dairy products, diamond processing); mining (diamonds, gold, uranium, copper, lead, zinc, tin, silver, tungsten); agriculture (cattle, chicken, poultry, crops, forestry), fishing

External
- Exports: ▲ N$125.7 billion (2025)
- Export goods: Top 5 export goods (2025): Uranium: 22.4%; Non-monetary gold: 16.0%; Precious stones (diamonds): 11.7%; Fish: 11.4%; Petroleum oils: 3.8%
- Main export partners: Top 5 export markets (2025): South Africa 23.2%; China 18.1%; Botswana 11.3%; Zambia 10.2%; Spain 4.5%
- Imports: ▼ N$150.7 billion (2025)
- Import goods: Top 5 import goods (2025): Petroleum oils: 14.9%; Motor vehicles (commercial): 4.2%; Nickel ores, concentrates: 3.1%; Base metal ores, concentrates: 2.6%; Motor vehicles (for personal use): 2.6%
- Main import partners: Top 5 import partners (2025): South Africa 37.9%; China 11.9%; India 6.3%; Zambia 3.4%; Oman 3.4%
- FDI stock: ▲ N$222.0 billion inflow stock as at Q2 2025
- Current account: ▲ −N$34.7 billion (2024)

Public finance
- Government debt: ▲67.3% of GDP (2024/25)
- Foreign reserves: ▲ N$63.0 billion (31 December 2024)
- Revenue: ▲ N$89.1 billion (2024/25)
- Spending: ▲ N$99.5 billion (2024/25)
- All values, unless otherwise stated, are in US dollars.

Namibia has a developing economy. It has a modern market sector, which produces most of the country's wealth, and a traditional subsistence sector. Although the majority of the population engages in subsistence agriculture and herding, the nation has more than 200,000 skilled workers.

== Overview ==
Namibia is a lower-middle income country with an annual gross domestic product (GDP) per capita of $4,413 in 2025, but has extreme inequalities in income distribution and standard of living. It has the second-highest Gini coefficient out of all nations, with a coefficient of 59.1 as of 2015. Only South Africa has a higher Gini coefficient. However, many Namibians in rural areas do not live on the monetary system and instead engage in subsistence farming.

Since independence in 1990, the Namibian government has pursued free-market economic principles designed to promote commercial development and job creation to bring disadvantaged Namibians into the economic mainstream. To facilitate this goal, the government has actively courted donor assistance and foreign investment. The liberal Foreign Investment Act of 1990 provides guarantees against nationalisation, freedom to remit capital and profits, currency convertibility, and a process for settling disputes equitably. Namibia also is addressing the sensitive issue of agrarian land reform in a pragmatic manner. The government runs and owns a number of companies such as TransNamib and NamPost, most of which need frequent financial assistance to stay afloat.

The country's formal economy is supported by capital-intensive industries and farming. Namibia's economy is heavily dependent on the earnings generated from primary commodity exports in a few vital sectors, including minerals, especially diamonds, uranium, and gold, as well as livestock, and fish. The Namibian economy is highly integrated with the economy of South Africa, where 47% of Namibia's imports originated in 2019.

In 1993, Namibia became a signatory of the General Agreement on Tariffs and Trade (GATT). Namibia is a member of the International Monetary Fund and the World Bank.

In January 2021, President Hage Geingob formed the Namibia Investment Promotion and Development Board (NIPDB) as a successor to the Namibia Investment Centre with a view to reforming the country's economic sector. Nangula Nelulu Uaandja was appointed as its first CEO. Although originally established as an autonomous entity under the Namibian Presidency, the NIPDB was integrated into the Ministry of International Relations and Trade (MIRT) in 2025 under President Netumbo Nandi-Ndaitwah.

== Regional integration ==
Given its small domestic market but favourable location on Africa's southwestern coast along with a well-developed transport and communications base, Namibia is a leading advocate of regional economic integration. The Tripoli-Cape Town Highway and the Trans-Kalahari Corridor pass through Namibia, as do the Walvis Bay-Ndola-Lubumbashi Development Corridor, the Trans-Cunene Corridor, and the Trans-Oranje Corridor.

In addition to its membership in the Southern African Development Community (SADC) and the Common Monetary Area (CMA), Namibia is a member of the Southern African Customs Union (SACU) with South Africa, Botswana, Lesotho, and Eswatini. Within SACU, there are no customs on goods produced in and transported between its members. Namibia is a net recipient of SACU revenues; receiving N$27.1 billion in 2024. In recent years, Namibia has accounted for about 5% of total SACU exports, and a slightly higher percentage of imports.

The Namibian economy is closely linked to South Africa, with the Namibian dollar pegged to the South African rand at a fixed exchange rate of 1:1 as part of the CMA. Namibia imports most of its goods from South Africa. Many exports likewise go to the South African market or transit that country.

Namibia is seeking to diversify its trading relationships away from its heavy dependence on South African goods and services. Europe has become a leading market for Namibian fish and meat, while mining concerns in Namibia have purchased heavy equipment and machinery from Germany, the United Kingdom, the United States, and Canada. The government is making efforts to take advantage of the US African Growth and Opportunity Act (AGOA), which provides preferential access to American markets for a long list of products. In the short term, Namibia is likely to see growth in the apparel manufacturing industry as a result of AGOA.

== Selected macroeconomic indicators ==
Year	2014	2015	2016	2017	2018	2019	2020	2021	2022	2023	2024
Nominal GDP at market prices (N$ billion)	134,836	146,019	157,708	171,570	181,067	181,211	174,243	183,292	205,584	228,887	245,097
Real GDP at market prices (N$ billion, 2015 prices)	140,047	146,019	146,068	144,568	146,100	144,874	133,137	137,935	145,382	151,841	157,476
Real GDP growth	6.09%	4.26%	0.03%	-1.03%	1.06%	-0.84%	-8.10%	3.60%	5.40%	4.44%	3.71%
Inflation	5.35%	3.40%	6.72%	6.16%	4.29%	3.73%	2.21%	3.61%	6.07%	5.89%	4.25%

== Sectors ==
Namibia's economy is relatively undiversified, with mining dominating exports and fiscal revenues. Nonetheless, the tertiary sector was the main contributor to GDP in 2025, accounting for 55%. The primary and secondary sectors contributed 21% and 15%, respectively.

=== Mining and energy ===
Namibia is heavily dependent on the extraction and processing of minerals for export, with ores and minerals accounting for 46.0% of 2024 exports. The bulk of fiscal revenue is created by metal ores and uranium ore, which made up 31.5% of 2024 exports. Namibian mining is dominated by diamonds, uranium, gold, metal ores, copper and zinc, though the country also extracts silver, tin, vanadium, semiprecious gemstones, tantalite, phosphate, sulphur, and salt. In 2003, diamonds, uranium and gold accounted for over 95% of Namibia’s mining GDP.

Despite economic diversification in other sectors, the mining sector has maintained strong contributions to annual GDP figures. Average contribution since 1980 stands at 11%. In 2025, mining contributed 14% to Namibia's GDP. The sector grew by 13.9% annually on average between 1981 and 2018, but recorded a decline in real value added of 3.4% in 2024 and 9.4% in 2025.

In 2020, only 11.9% of the mines in the country were Namibian owned. In 2025, the Minister of Industries, Mines and Energy proposed a plan to ensure all future Namibians mines were at least 51 percent locally owned.

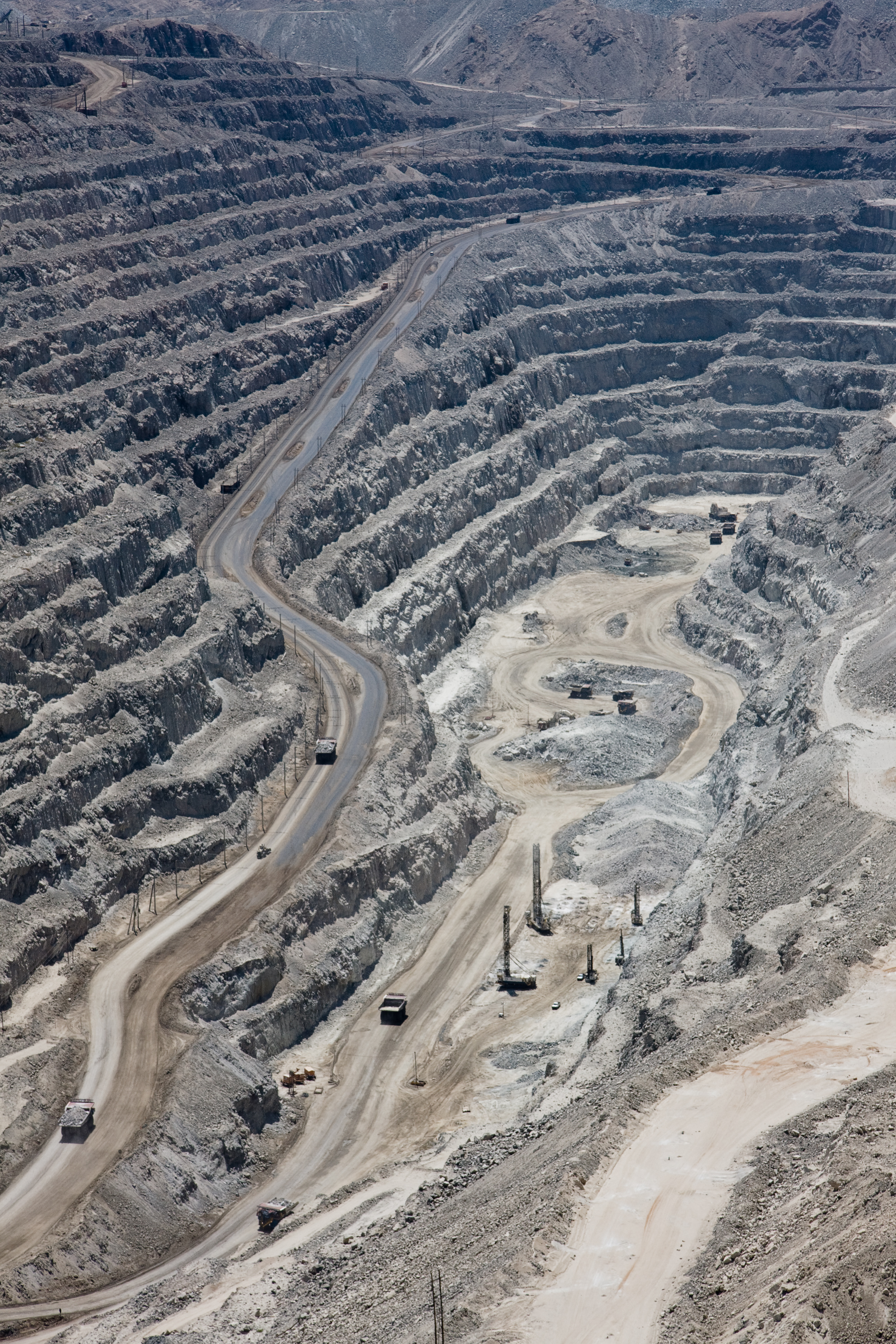
Rössing uranium mine, an open-pit mine located near Arandis, Erongo Region

==== Diamonds ====
Rich alluvial diamond deposits make Namibia a primary source for gem-quality diamonds. They have long been the cornerstone of Namibian mining, with diamond mining being the largest contributor to nominal mining GDP for at least 40 years since 1980 (since such data exists). However, its status as the main contributor has been overtaken by metal ores mining (primarily gold) given gradually declining global demand and diamond prices in the 2020s. Diamond mining contributed 2.4% to GDP in 2025.

Despite the global decline in prices, Namibia continues to produce and export the highest-value diamonds globally; in 2024, Namibia's carat value in diamond production averaged $417 per carat, nearly 5 times the global average. Accounting for only 2% of global production volumes in 2024, Namibia contributed 10% of total diamond value, its highest share on record.

Diamond mining temporarily regained its status as the largest contributor to nominal mining GDP in 2022, when production increased over 45% due to a record 1.725 million carats produced by Debmarine Namibia, with the Benguela Gem diamond recovery vessel also producing 480,000 carats. Diamond production totalled 2.2 million carats in 2022, generating over N$14 billion in export earnings.

==== Uranium ====
Namibia is the third-largest producer of uranium globally, producing 7,333 tonnes in 2023, equivalent to 12.2% of global uranium production. Uranium mining contributed 2.7% to GDP in 2025.

Namibia is home to three uranium mines: Langer Heinrich, Husab and Rössing. The Rössing mine began operations in 1976, with Langer Heinrich opening in 2006 and Husab in 2014. The Husab mine produced 4,437 tonnes of uranium in 2023, while the Rössing mine produced 2,205 tonnes. Langer Heinrich restarted operations in 2024 after having been closed in 2018.

Russian state-owned Rosatom plans in-situ leach mining in eastern Namibia, but groundwater safety concerns have stalled the project.

==== Oil and gas ====
During the pre-independence period, large areas of Namibia, including offshore, were leased for oil prospecting. Natural gas was discovered in 1974 in the Kudu gas field off the mouth of the Orange River, but the extent of this find is only now being determined. Norwegian operator BW Energy expects a final investment decision in late 2026. An associated Kudu power project, to be run by NamPower, is planned. With a capacity of up to 800 MW, the plant could supply 50 to 60% of Namibia's baseload power needs.

In 2022, with offshore discoveries of an estimated 11 billion barrels of crude oil by Shell and TotalEnergies, Namibia became an exploration frontier. As of 2026, several companies are drilling exploratory wells. The government is aiming for first production in 2030, although none of the oil majors have confirmed final investment decisions.

To manage potential oil revenues effectively, the Namibian government has proposed the creation of a sovereign wealth fund. This fund is intended to secure long-term economic stability and allocate benefits across generations. Legislation to outline the management, investment strategies, and withdrawal protocols of the fund is currently under development. This approach reflects Namibia's strategic planning to harness its oil resources responsibly while aiming for sustainable economic growth and ensuring that the benefits are widely distributed among its population.

==== Green hydrogen ====
In 2021, the Namibian government declared the country's ambition to become a leader in green hydrogen, and signed a corresponding partnership agreement with Germany. In 2022, a partnership with the European Union was signed at COP27. Multiple projects are planned.

As of 2025, Namibia hosts the only two operational green hydrogen projects in Africa.

The construction of the continent’s first pilot plant—the Hydrogen Dune project by the Belgian shipping and clean-tech company CMB.TECH (as part of the Cleanergy Solutions Namibia joint venture)—began in September 2023 in Walvis Bay. At the same time, the Hyphen Hydrogen Energy consortium is developing a significantly larger, gigawatt-scale industrial project in Tsau-Khaeb National Park near Lüderitz to produce green hydrogen and ammonia for international export.

In May 2026, in line with its broader green industrialisation strategy, the government announced the establishment of a "Green Industries Council", replacing its "Green Hydrogen Council".

=== Agriculture ===
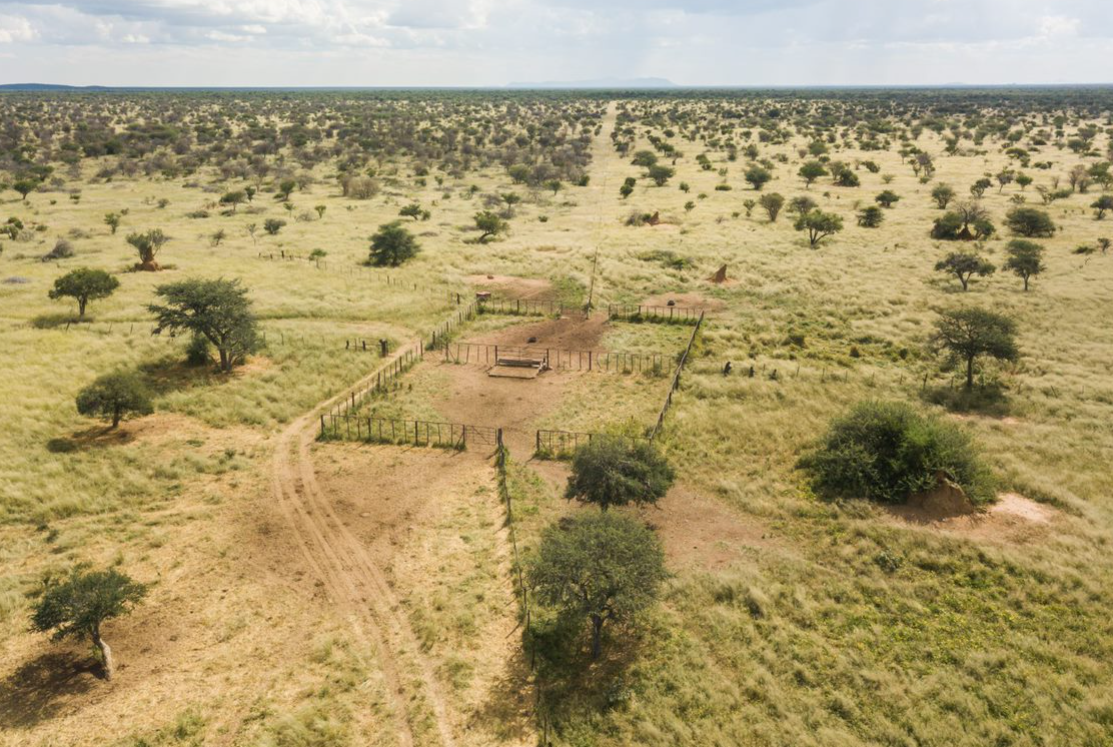
Grazing camp for livestock in the Central Thornveld of Namibia

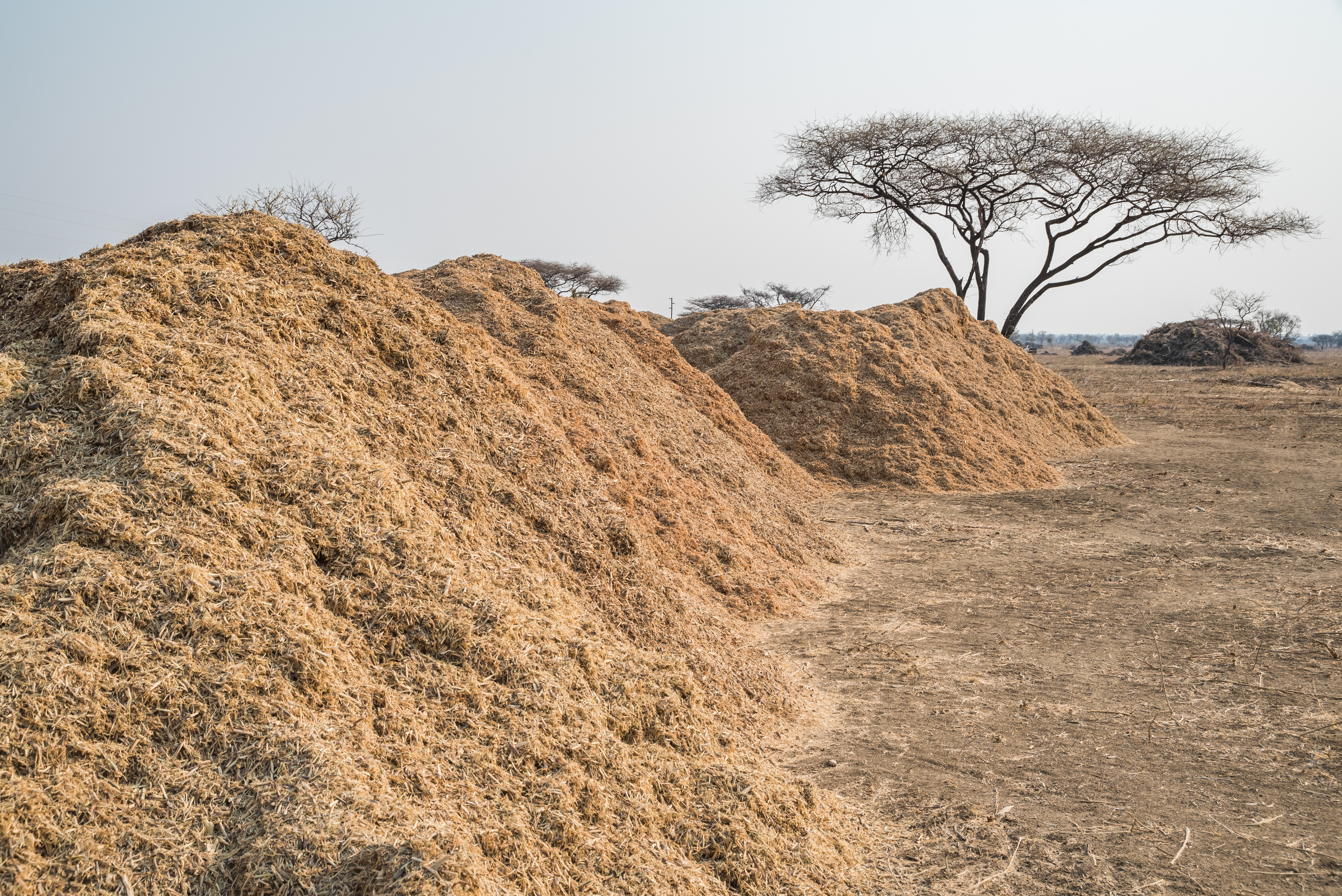
Chipped woody biomass in Namibia for thermal energy applications

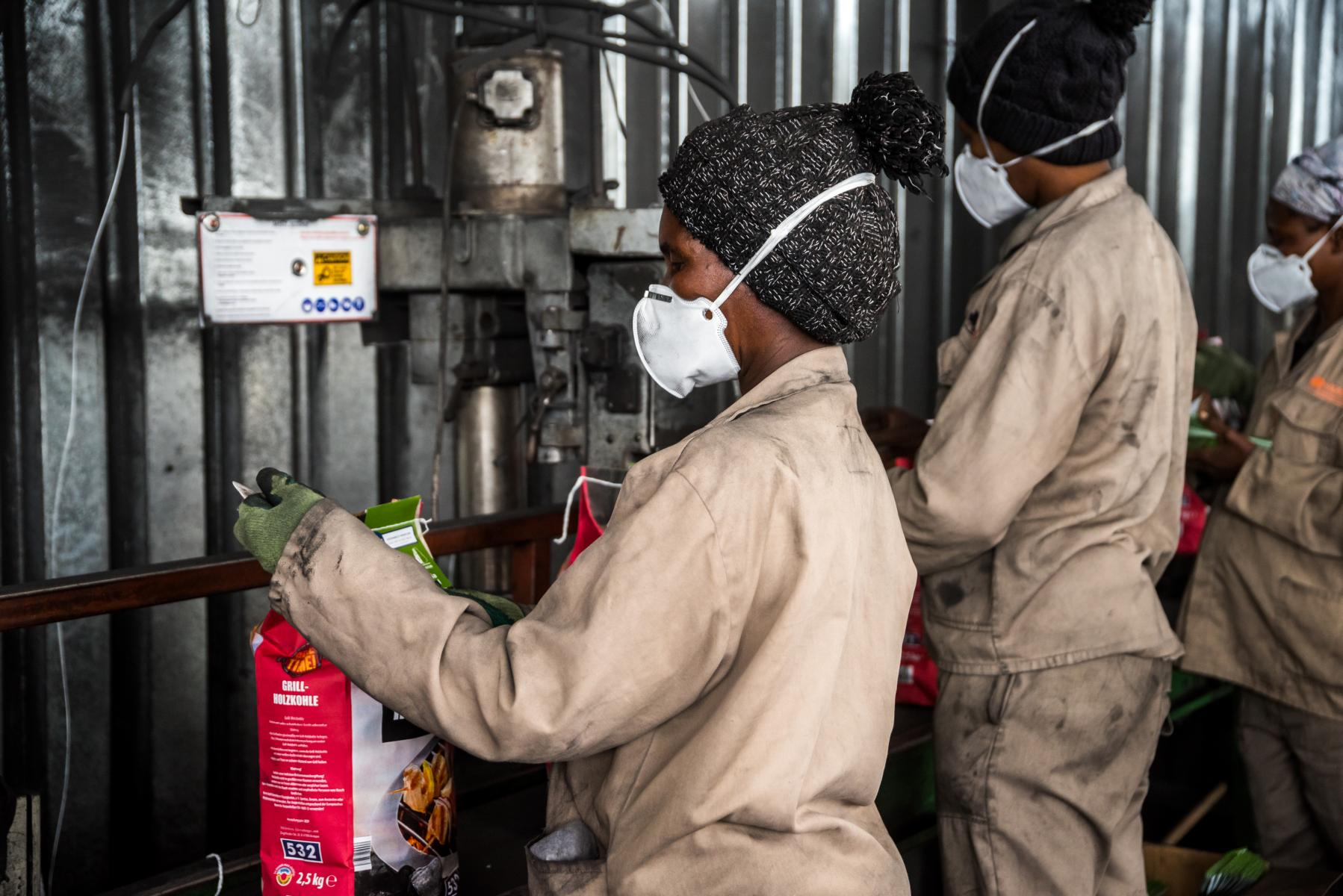
Packaging of export charcoal produced from encroacher bush

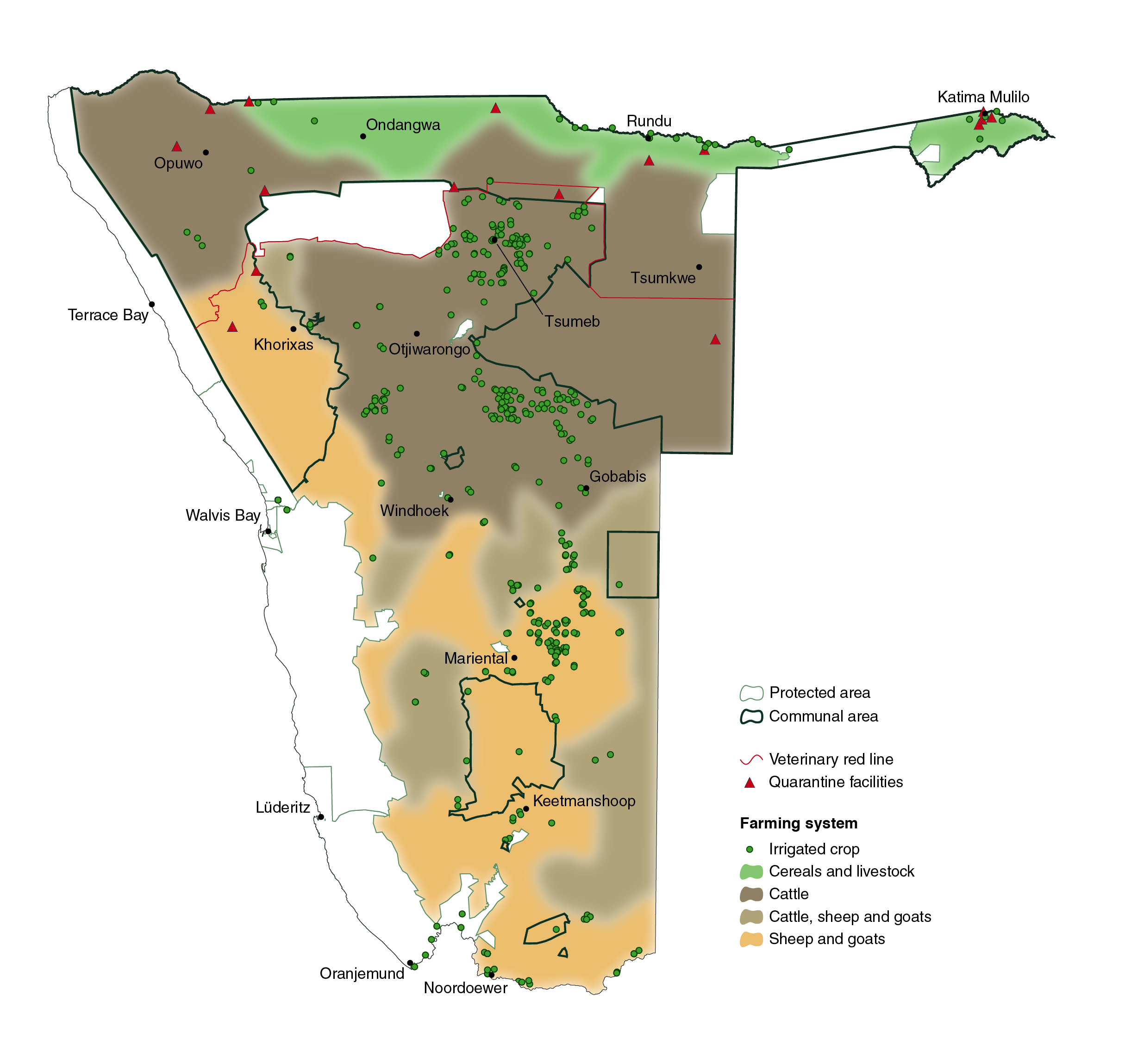
Major farm products and land uses in Namibia

Crop farming contributed 2.3% to GDP in 2025 while livestock farming contributed 2.2%. Lifestock farming recorded a decline in real value added of 21.7% in 2025.

Although arable land accounts for only 1% of Namibia, nearly half of the population is employed in agriculture. About half of the population depends on agriculture (largely subsistence agriculture) for its livelihood, but Namibia must still import some of its food. Although per capita GDP is five times that of Africa's poorest countries, the majority of Namibia's people live in rural areas and exist on a subsistence way of life.

Namibia has one of the highest rates of income inequality in the world, due in part to the existence of a more rural, cashless informal economy. The inequality figures thus take into account people who do not actually rely on the formal economy for their survival.

About 4,000, mostly white, commercial farmers own almost half of Namibia's arable land. Agreement has been reached on the privatisation of several more enterprises in coming years, with hopes that this will stimulate much needed foreign investment. However, reinvestment of environmentally derived capital has hobbled Namibian per capita income.

One of the fastest growing areas of economic development in Namibia is the growth of wildlife conservancies. These conservancies are particularly important to the rural, generally unemployed population.

Agriculture is increasingly under pressure due to frequent and prolonged droughts as well as woody plant encroachment. These render conventional agriculture unsustainable for a growing number of land owners, with many diverting their economic activities to alternative or additional sources of income.

In recent years, the utilisation of residual biomass that results from the control of woody plant encroachment has gained traction. In 2022, Namibia was the seventh largest exporter of charcoal globally, with total export volumes of over 280,000 tonnes and revenues of $75 million. Other products from local encroacher biomass include bush-based animal fodder, wood-plastic composite materials, thermal energy in a cement factory and a brewery and biochar. In 2019, it was estimated that 10,000 workers were employed in the growing sub-sector of biomass utilisation, rendering it one of the biggest sub-sectors in terms of employment.

=== Fishing ===
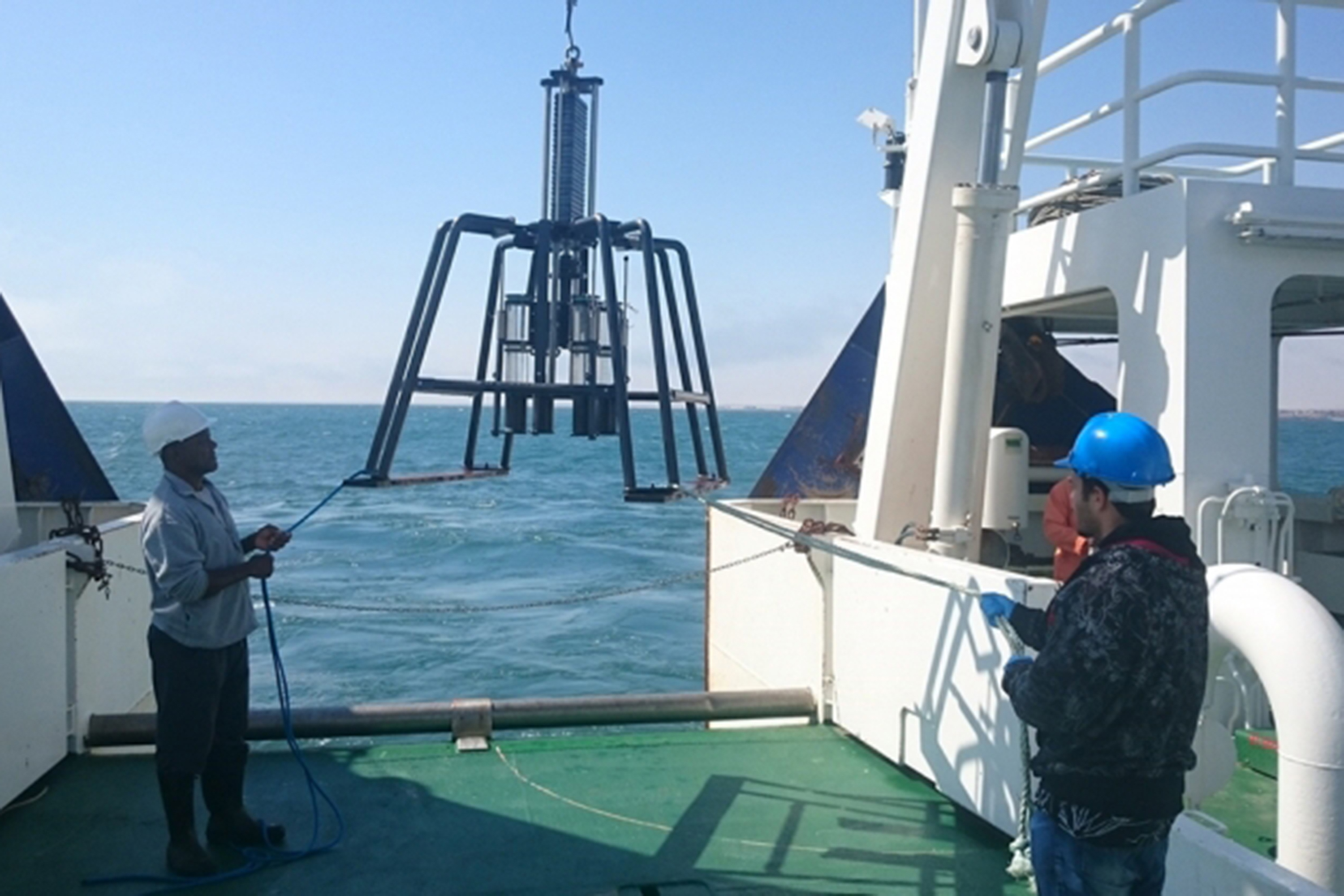
Workers on a governmental marine research vessel in Namibia

The cold southern Atlantic waters off the coast of Namibia are home to some of the richest fishing grounds in the world thanks to the Benguela Current. Total annual catches in 2023 were about 373,000 tonnes, well below the 2003 peak of 637,000 tonnes. Fishing and onboard fish processing contributed 2.5% to GDP in 2025.

The main species found in abundance off Namibia are pilchards (sardines), anchovy, hake, and horse mackerel. There also are smaller but significant quantities of sole, squid, deep-sea crab, rock lobster, and tuna.

At the time of independence, fish stocks had fallen to dangerously low levels due to the lack of protection and conservation of the fisheries and the over-exploitation of these resources. This trend appears to have been halted and reversed since independence, as the Namibian government is now pursuing a conservative resource management policy along with an aggressive fisheries enforcement campaign. The government seeks to develop fish-farming as an alternative and has prioritised it as part of its development plans.

The fishing sector was the subject of the biggest corruption scandal in Namibian history. On 12 November 2019, WikiLeaks published the Fishrot Files, thousands of documents and email communications by employees of Icelandic fishing company Samherji, which indicated that hundreds of millions Icelandic króna (ISK) had been paid to high ranking politicians and officials in Namibia with the objective of acquiring fishing quotas. Namibia's Ministers of Fisheries and Justice were forced to resign due to their involvement.

=== Manufacturing and infrastructure ===
In 2025, Namibia's manufacturing sector contributed 10% of GDP. Namibian manufacturing is inhibited by a small domestic market, dependence on imported goods, limited supply of local capital, a widely dispersed population, a small skilled labour force and high relative wage rates, and subsidised competition from South Africa.

Major manufacturers include MeatCo, Namib Mills, Bokomo, the Ohtlhaver & List Group, Namibia Breweries (bought by Heineken in 2023), Ohorongo Cement and the Sinomine-run Tsumeb smelter.

Walvis Bay is the country's main port and hosts the Walvis Bay Export Processing Zone. It is a well-developed deepwater port, and Namibia's fishing infrastructure is most heavily concentrated there. The Namibian government expects Walvis Bay to become an important commercial gateway to the Southern African region. There are also plans for an expansion of the port at Lüderitz, including an oil and gas terminal related to the discovery of offshore oil reserves. The Namibian Ports Authority is partnering with the European Union and the Port of Rotterdam to build export infrastructure for critical minerals and hydrogen-based fuels near Lüderitz.

Namibia has civil aviation facilities, rail transport and an extensive road network. Construction is underway on two new arteries—the Trans-Caprivi Highway and Trans-Kalahari Highway—which will open up the region's access to Walvis Bay.

=== Tourism ===
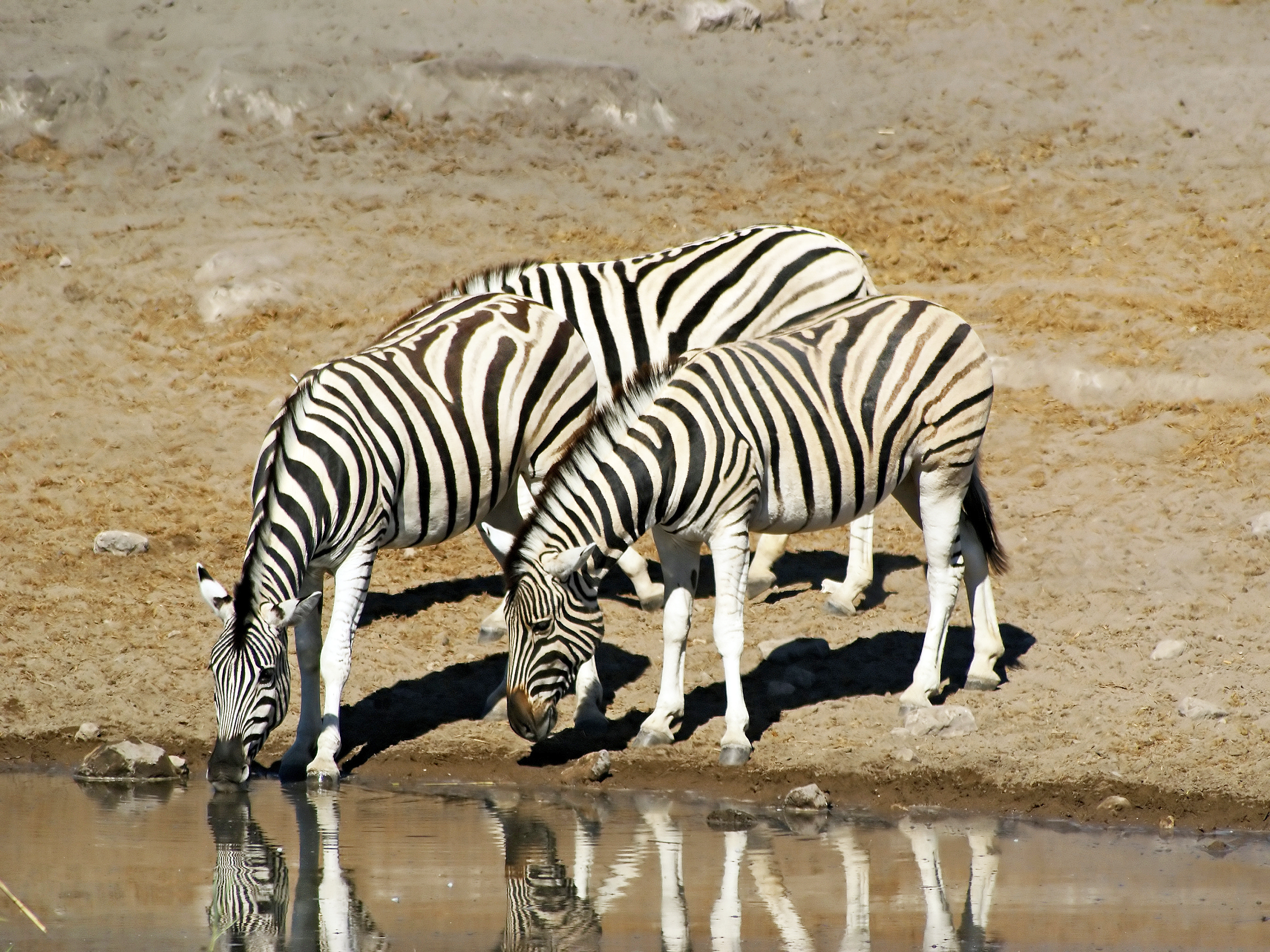
An example of Namibian wildlife, the plains zebra, one focus of tourism

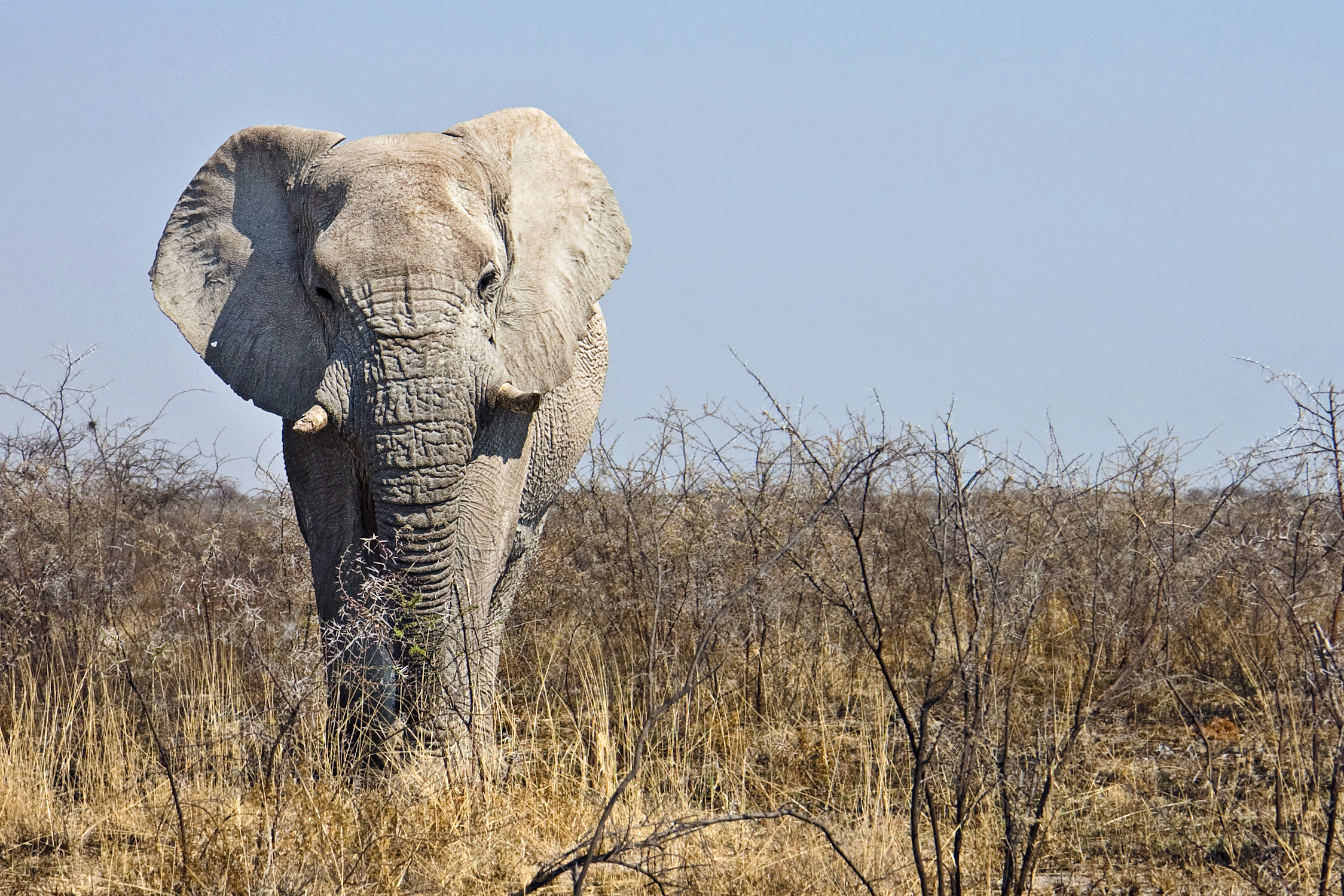
Elephant in the Etosha National Park

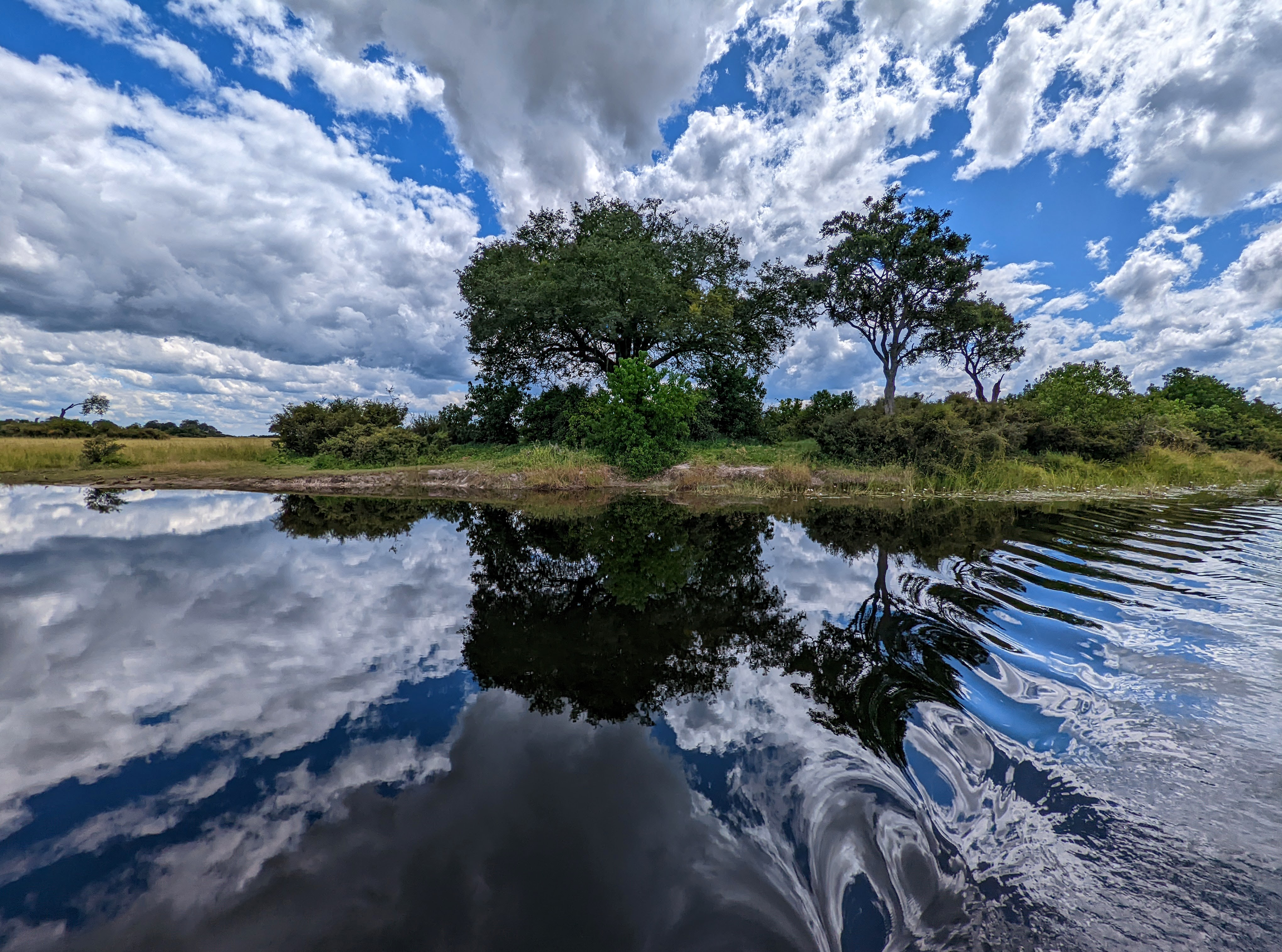
A view into Namibia from the border of Botswana, on the Linyanti River

The World Travel and Tourism Council estimated that, in 2008, tourism contributed 14.5% to Namibia's GDP, accounting for 18.2% of all employment. The most visited places include the Caprivi Strip, Fish River Canyon, Sossusvlei, the Skeleton Coast Park, Sesriem, Etosha Pan and the coastal towns of Swakopmund, Walvis Bay and Lüderitz.

The country is among the prime destinations in Africa and is known for ecotourism featuring Namibia's extensive wildlife. There are many lodges and reserves to accommodate eco-tourists.

Sport hunting is also a large and growing component of the Namibian economy, with Namibia boasting numerous species sought after by international sport hunters. It accounted for 14% of total tourism in 2000, equivalent to $19.6 million.

Extreme sports such as sandboarding, skydiving and 4x4ing have become popular, and many cities have companies that provide tours.

For 2020, it was projected that tourism would bring N$26 million. However, due to the COVID-19 pandemic, Namibia saw a reduction of almost 90% in tourism. By 2024, tourism had recovered to 79% of pre-pandemic levels.

=== Services ===
The service sector contributed 55% of GDP in 2025, with 11.7% coming from wholesale and retail trade, 9% from education, 8.5% from financial and insurance services, and 8.2% from public administration. The sector recorded an increase in real value added of 5.2% in 2024 and 4.2% in 2025.

== Labour ==
While many Namibians are economically active in one form or another, the bulk of this activity is in the informal sector, primarily subsistence agriculture. A large number of Namibians seeking jobs in the formal sector are held back due to a lack of necessary skills or training. The government is aggressively pursuing education reform to overcome this problem.

The country's unemployment rate was 33.4% in 2018. However, compared to other SADC countries, Namibia has a relatively high percentage of skilled labour and low unemployment rates for skilled workers. To fight high unemployment, particularly amongst the youth, the government approved a program aimed at incentivising employers to enroll more interns by providing an additional corporate tax deduction. The total financial implication for the government is estimated at N$126 million.

Employment rates in Namibia generally increase with education status. A high school education typically ensures greater employment rates than those with no education or those with primary or junior secondary education as their highest achievement. Namibians with a university certificate, diploma or degree have a significantly higher employment rate at 76.4%, while postgraduate education holders are most likely to be employed with an employment rate of 83.8% in 2018. The table below shows the 2018 Namibia Labour Force Survey employment statistics by education.

	No education	Primary	Junior secondary	Senior secondary	Technical/vocational certificate or diploma	Currently in year 1, 2 or 3 of tertiary education	University certificate, diploma or degree	Postgraduate certificate, diploma or degree
Total	187,100	346,157	541,281	274,628	30,101	30,612	77,615	21,922
Employed	85,352	146,089	229,259	146,874	16,292	12,595	59,328	18,378
% employed	45.6%	42.2%	42.4%	53.5%	54.1%	41.1%	76.4%	83.8%

The 2018 Namibia Labour Force Survey indicates that 6.6% of the working age population had tertiary education of any level, while 1.5% of the working age population had a postgraduate education.

Namibians in the informal sector as well as in low-paid jobs like homemakers, gardeners or factory workers are unlikely to be covered by medical aid or a pension fund. All in all, only a quarter or the working population have medical aid, and about half have a pension fund.

Namibia's largest trade union federation, the National Union of Namibian Workers (NUNW) represents workers organised into seven affiliated trade unions. NUNW maintains a close affiliation with the ruling SWAPO party.

== Household wealth and income ==
In the financial year March 2009 – February 2010, Namibians earned N$15,000 (roughly $2,000) on average. Household income was dominated by wages (49.1%) and subsistence farming (23%), with further significant sources of income being business activities (8.1%, farming excluded), old-age pensions from government (9.9%), and cash remittance (2.9%). Commercial farming only contributed 0.6%.

Namibian residents had on average $10,800 of wealth accumulated in 2016, putting Namibia in third place in Africa. Individual wealth is, however, distributed very unequally; the country's Gini coefficient of 0.61 is one of the highest in the world. There are 3,300 US$-millionaires in Namibia, 1,400 of which live in the capital Windhoek.

== Namibian businesspeople ==
- Benjamin Hauwanga
- Frans Indongo
- Monica Kalondo
- Harold Pupkewitz (1915–2012)
- Wilhelm Sander (1860–1930)
- Sven Thieme

== See also ==
- Bank of Namibia
- List of state-owned enterprises in Namibia
- United Nations Economic Commission for Africa
