= List of state-owned enterprises in Namibia =

As of 2017 there were a total of 97 state-owned enterprises, also called public enterprises, in Namibia.

18 of the public enterprises are profit-driven and fall under the Ministry of Public Enterprises established in March 2015. Leon Jooste heads this ministry. The other state-owned commercial entities are mainly active in education, media, and transport. They execute state functions and fall under their respective line ministries. Some of the state-owned enterprises in Namibia are:

Company name	Budget contribution 2013/2014-2015/2016	Description	Classification
Agribank	-284 Mio	Financing of agricultural projects and farm acquisitions	Financial
August 26 Group		Defence	Commercial
Bank of Namibia	262 Mio		Financial
Development Bank of Namibia	-350 Mio	Development of SMEs	Financial
Diamond Board of Namibia			Regulatory
Electricity Control Board			Regulatory
Epangelo Mining	-33 Mio		
Film Commission of Namibia			Regulatory
Financial Interagency Centre	-45 Mio		
National Fishing Corporation of Namibia		Fishing quotas	Commercial
Fisheries Observer Agency	-23 Mio		Regulatory
Karakul Board of South West Africa			Regulatory
Land Acquisition and Development Fund	-245 Mio	Implementing land reform	
Meat Board of Namibia			Regulatory
Minerals Development Fund of Namibia			Financial
NamDeb	1,514 Mio	Diamond mining	
Namibia Airports Company	-283 Mio	Maintenance of Namibian airports	Commercial
Namibian Broadcasting Corporation	-1,055 Mio	State broadcaster	Media
Namibia Diamond Trading Company	294 Mio	Diamond trading	
Namibia Development Corporation	-49 Mio		
Namibia Financial Institutions Supervisory Authority (NamFISA)			Regulatory
Namibian Agronomic Board			Regulatory
Namibia National Reinsurance Corporation	3 Mio	Reinsurance	Financial
Namibian College of Open Learning (NamCOL)	-258 Mio	Secondary education	
Namibian Communications Commission			Regulatory
Namibian Competition Commission			Regulatory
Namibian Institute for Public Administration and Management (NIPAM)	-162 Mio	Tertiary education for Government	
Namibian Maritime and Fisheries Institute	-23 Mio	Tertiary education	Educational
Namibian Ports Authority	-205 Mio	Management of Namibian ports	Commercial
Namibian Standards Institution	-124 Mio	Develop and maintain standards for Namibia	
Namibia Post & Telecommunications Ltd	50 Mio		Commercial
Namibia Power Corporation		Power supply	Commercial
Namibia Press Agency (NAMPA)	-60 Mio		Media
Namibia Qualifications Authority	-75 Mio	Registering Namibian educational qualifications and evaluating foreign degrees	
Namibia Statistics Agency	-158 Mio	Collect, analyse, and disseminate statistics for the formulation of public policy	
Namibia Students' Financial Assistance Fund	-2,013 Mio	Student loans	
Namibia Tourism Board	-90 Mio	Development of the tourism sector	Regulatory
Namibia Training Authority	-899 Mio	Vocational education	
Namibia Water Corporation		Water supply and sanitation	Commercial
Namibia Wildlife Resorts	-52 Mio	Operation of the major tourist resorts in Namibia	Commercial
Namibia University of Science and Technology	-996 Mio	Tertiary education	
NamZim	-24 Mio	Runs the SWAPO and ZANU-PF-friendly weekly Southern Times	Media
National Emergency and Disaster Management Fund	-82 Mio	Managing floods, droughts, and food assistance programmes	
National Housing Enterprise	-320 Mio	Provisioning of housing for low and middle-income families	Financial
National Petroleum Corporation of Namibia			Regulatory
National Special Risks Association			Financial
National Youth Council	-56 Mio		
National Youth Service	-232 Mio	Employment and training projects for the Namibian youth	
New Era	-57 Mio	State-owned newspaper	Media
Offshore Development Company		Management of the Walvis Bay Export Processing Zone	Commercial
Regional Equity and Development Fund	-90 Mio		
Road Funds Administration			Regulatory
Roads Authority	-6 Mio	Maintenance of Namibian roads	Regulatory
Security Enterprises and Security Officers Regulation Board			Regulatory
SME Bank of Namibia	-161 Mio	Financing Namibian SMEs	
Social Security Commission	-51 Mio		Welfare
TransNamib Holdings	-90 Mio	Operation of Namibian railways	Commercial
University of Namibia	-2,647 Mio	Tertiary education	Educational
Veterans Subversion Fund	-1,382 Mio	Uplifting veterans of the South African Border War	
Windhoek Country Club and Casino		Hospitality	Commercial
Windhoeker Maschinenfabrik		Defence contractor, subsidiary of August 26 Group	Commercial
Youth Credit Scheme	-62 Mio		

== Former state-owned enterprises ==
The following companies were state-owned, and have been dissolved:

Company name	Last budget contribution (year)	Description	Classification	Dissolved in
Air Namibia	-1,766 Mio (2013/2014-2015/2016)	National airline	Commercial	2021
Roads Contractor Company		Road maintenance	Commercial	Not finalised
Namibia Bricks Enterprises		Brick manufacturing	Commercial	2000s
Star Protection Services		Security	Commercial	2000s
