= Ministry of Public Enterprises (Namibia) =

Namibian government department responsible for state-owned commercial entities

The Ministry of Public Enterprises (MPE) was a department of the Namibian government. It was established in 2015 and existed in this form until 2022. The only minister in this ministry was Leon Jooste.

The ministry was set up to manage 18 profit-driven state-owned enterprises in Namibia.

In 2021, the ministry began its transformation into a department, in Namibia the sub-ministerial entity, of the Ministry of Finance. For the state-owned companies, a holding company is to be created, a process estimated to take 5 years. Minister Jooste resigned from his position on 31 March 2022. Because he intended to return to the private sector he also vacated his cabinet and parliament seats, as well as his position on the SWAPO central committee.
