= Kudu gas field =

Offshore gas field of Namibia

- Location within Namibia
- Country: Namibia
- Offshore/onshore: Offshore
- Coordinates: 27.926°S 14.600°E
- Partners: BW Kudu, Namcor

Field history
- Discovery: 1974
- Start of production: Not yet

Production
- Estimated gas in place: 1,300×10^{9} cu ft (37×10^{9} m^{3})
- Producing formations: Barremian sandstones

The Kudu gas field is an offshore gas field in Namibia approximately 170 kilometres (110 mi) north-west from the town of Oranjemund. It is located in the Orange Sub-basin in 170 metres (560 ft) of water.

== History ==
Discovered in 1974, the license has been held by a number of companies including Royal Dutch Shell, Chevron Texaco and Energy Africa. In 2004, Tullow Oil acquired Energy Africa for US$570 million and with its 90% interest in the license. Later Tullow Oil sold 20% of the project to Itochu. The remaining 10% is held by Namibian state oil company Namcor.

On Tuesday, 18 September 2007, shares of Tullow Oil declined by more than 3.0% after the group announced that it had to abandon the Kudu-8 exploration well offshore Namibia and that a second well planned nearby won't be drilled.

In 2010, Namcor and Russian gas company Gazprom agreed to establish a special purpose company to take a majority stake in the Kudu gas field.

In 2017, BW Kudu, a subsidiary of BW Offshore, entered into a Farm-Out Agreement for a 56% stake of the Kudu license. Namcor holds the remaining 44% stake in the license.

== Reserves ==
The field is estimated to contain 1.3 trillion cubic feet (37×10^{9} m^{3}) of proven natural gas reserves however more recent exploration and analysis suggests that reserves could reach 3 trillion cubic feet (85×10^{9} m^{3}) with potential up to 9 trillion cubic feet (250×10^{9} m^{3}). These figures though are dependent on further work that is yet to be carried out by Tullow Oil on different parts of the field with other geological settings.

== Development ==
Suggested development of the field has been for a subsea tie back which would potentially make it one of the world's longest. The tie back would connect it to an 800-megawatt power plant to be located near Oranjemund. The field would be crucial in meeting Namibia's growing energy demand, as the country is currently facing a power crisis. The commissioning of Kudu gas and the additional power capacity of 400 MW (half of the total capacity of 800 MW is determined to benefit Namibia), the looming power shortages could be prevented.
