= Tutaleni Housing Project =

Neighborhood in Walvis Bay, Namibia

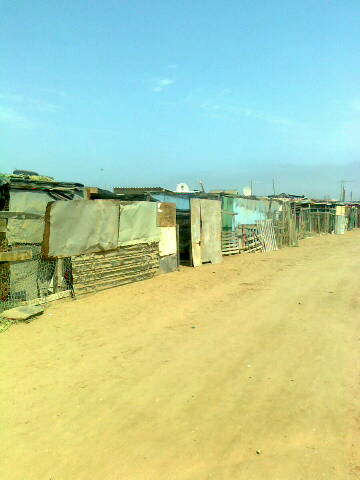
Shacks in Tutaleni in 2012.

Tutaleni (meaning let’s watch in Oshiwambo) is an informal settlement on the northern outskirts of Walvis Bay, in the Erongo region of Namibia. Popularly known by locals as the Tutaleni village or simply Tuta, it is home to about 1000 families living on 1200 plots measuring 300 sq.m each. The project is an initiative of the Walvis Bay municipality in its efforts to reduce the negative effects of a high number of shacks in the coastal town. A cement floor, toilet and kitchen sink are readily found on the plot, occupants are then free to complete their house structures with certain permitted building material. Residents of the settlement have access to clean water, power, waste removal and other basic municipal services.

== History ==
When Namibia won the Namibian War of Independence (which lasted for 12 years) and finally got its independence on 1 March 1990, Walvis bay remained under the control of the South African colonial regime, which meant Namibians could only enter Walvis Bay if they had a passport and special permit. It was not until 1994 that Walvis Bay got its sovereignty back. This meant people from all parts of the country could now freely move to and from Walvis Bay. The coastal town with its fishing industry and harbor was now one of the country's biggest business hubs. This attracted many job seekers from all parts of the country, especially the northern parts, most of whom found employment almost instantly. Family members of workers also moved there to be closer to their relatives who worked in Walvis Bay, most of whom resided in the Kuisebmund suburb. This urbanization trend caused a shortage of houses and lead to the mushrooming of shacks. In 1998 there were up to 13 shacks on a single plot, and a total of 13,287 shacks accommodating roughly 8 253 could be found in Kuisebmund. This phenomenon resulted in problems such as overcrowding, spreading of chronic diseases like tuberculosis, and unhygienic living conditions. In its efforts to curb this problem, The Walvis Bay municipality came up with a plan aimed at relocating shack dwellers to a hygienic and affordable settlement in 2000. In this plan the municipality availed block erf 3007 to be divided into 289 plots, each of which was to be no smaller than 300 m^{2} as prescribed by national legislation. The idea was that the Tutaleni village would remain the property of the Walvis bay municipality and that residents would rent out the plots at $10 U$ per month. A technical subcommittee and an administrative subcommittee made up the Tutaleni Relocation Steering Committee, which consists of members of the community and was set up to oversee the implementation and management of the housing project. This was the birth of the Tutaleni housing project. The US$1,588,000 project took about three years to complete, and the first residents moved in early 2001.

== Features ==
=== Affordable housing ===
The town is surrounded by the Namib Desert and land is thus scarce, this coupled with a high demand for land due to urbanization has caused the price of land to be high. Residential property in Walvis Bay like in any other urban town is thus very expensive and unaffordable to most middle class families. Amidst Walvis Bay's high cost of living, the municipality has through the Tutaleni housing project managed to provide residents with affordable housing. Residents pay a mere N$140 for rent making it an affordable solution for even the underemployed residents. Families may use cheap non-conventional building material, making it even more affordable.

=== Dubai International best practice award ===
The Dubai government and the United Arab Emirates created the award to promote and reward towns and cities that can sustainably cater for all its residents needs for shelter. The award was established in November 1995 under the directive of the late Sheikh Maktoum Bin Rashid Al Maktoum and is administered jointly with UN-HABITAT. In 2003 The Tutaleni Housing Project won the Best practices award and received prize money of US$30 000, a trophy and a commemorative certificate.

=== Improved living conditions ===
Before the Tutaleni village was established, the Walvis bay municipality was faced with a costly sewerage bursting problem caused by the large number of people using a single toilet. More than one sewerage pipe would often burst at the same time and thus waste water would sometimes log in the streets for several days. Conditions were extremely unhygienic as sewage water is a breeding place for bacteria and diseases like Cholera. Contagious diseases such as tuberculosis also spread fast among the highly dense shacks. In addition, shack dwellers faced a fire hazard, as their shacks were very close to each other and sometimes joined. The housing project has greatly reduced and in a sense almost completely solved all these problems. Residents also now have access to clean water, electricity, indoor toilets with shower and basin, and refuse bins. Protection from fire hazards was also ensured by leaving a space of at least 5 metres between erfs; this prevented fires from spreading easily and left enough space to move easily during emergency situations.

== Challenges ==
=== Conflict over plot ownership ===
There has been ongoing disagreements between the Municipality and residents about ownership of plots, a situation which remains unresolved to date. The municipality wants to remain the sole owner of the property to ensure a place to stay for people who can not afford a house. The idea is that residents remain tenants for as long as they like but they are encouraged to give up their plots when they find other decent accommodation that they can afford. Residents then have to provide proof of the amount they spend on building material and the new tenants will refund them. However, residents claim that they were not informed of this and that they would like to buy off "their" property. Residents claim that they got the plots on an ownership contract and not a lease contract, they demonstrated and threatened to boycott the last Local Authority elections. The residents have since had several meetings to try to find a solution that will satisfy both parties.

=== Contravention of contract clauses ===
Clause number five of the contract does not allow tenants to sublet their units, it however came to light that some tenants are in fact subletting their units. Another issue is that of some tenants making money off shacks they have built around their units, who are in this way defeating the project's aim of eliminating backyard squatters. To add fuel to the fire, residents are running businesses in their units, which is also against the contract.
