= Trevino Forbes =

Namibian politician

Mayor of Walvis Bay
- Incumbent
- Assumed office 30 November 2020
- Preceded by: Immanuel Wilfried

Personal details
- Born: Trevino; 7 June 1985 (age 40) Rehoboth, Namibia
- Party: Independent Patriots for Change (IPC)
- Spouse: Vyhodia Forbes
- Children: 2

Trevino Forbes is a Namibian politician serving as mayor of Walvis Bay since December 2020. Forbes serves as the current Vice President of the Independent Patriots for Change (IPC).

== Mayoral career ==
Forbes joined the Independent Patriots for Change after its founding in August 2020. In the municipal election on 25 November 2020, Forbes was elected to the Walvis Bay local authority as the ruling party, SWAPO, lost their majority of seats on the council, winning only three out of the ten council seats. The IPC emerged as the largest party with four seats. Smaller parties, the Popular Democratic Movement, the Landless People's Movement and the Joint Walvis Bay Residents Association, won one seat each.

On 30 November, Forbes was elected mayor of Walvis Bay after a majority of councillors had voted for him. He is deputised by fellow IPC member Saara Mutondoka. On 28 November 2024, Trevino Forbes was re-elected as the mayor of Walvis Bay at a special council meeting.
