= FDPSO Azurite =

Vessel

History
- Name: Azurite
- Owner: Prosafe FPSO
- Operator: Prosafe Production
- Port of registry: Panama
- Builder: Hyundai Heavy Industries
- Yard number: 118969
- Completed: 1988
- Identification: IMO number: 8611831; MMSI number: 355247000

General characteristics
- Type: Floating, drilling, production, storage and offloading (FDPSO) vessel
- Tonnage: 259,999 long tons (291,199 short tons)
- Length: 322.22 m (1,057 ft 2 in)
- Beam: 56 m (183 ft 9 in)
- Draught: 19.667 m (64 ft 6.3 in)
- Depth: 29.5 m (96 ft 9 in)
- Capacity: 1.4 Mbbl (220×10^{3} m^{3}) (storage) 60 kbbl/d (9.5×10^{3} m^{3}/d) (processing)
- Crew: 80

FDPSO Azurite is the world's first floating, drilling, production, storage and offloading (FDPSO) vessel.

The Azurite was built at the shipyard of Hyundai Heavy Industries in 1988 as a very large crude carrier (VLCC). In 1988–1990 her name was Fina Europe, in 1990–1993 Sanco Europe, and in 1993–1997 MT Europe. She was converted at the Keppel Shipyard from the VLCC to FDPSO between July 2007 and February 2009.

The Azurite has storage capacity 1.4 million barrels (220×10^{3} m^{3}) of crude oil. Its processing capacity is 60 thousand barrels per day (9.5×10^{3} m^{3}/d) of fluid and 40 thousand barrels per day (6.4×10^{3} m^{3}/d) of oil.

Prosafe Production is responsible for the vessel operations and Murphy Oil is responsible for drilling.

On 10 August 2009, Azurite started production at the Azurite offshore oilfield in waters of the Republic of Congo.
