= Uilika Nambahu =

Walvis bay politician

Uilika Nambahu is a Namibian politician. She was elected mayor of Walvis Bay on 14 May 2008, succeeding Derek Klazen. In May 2010, she was re-elected to serve her third one-year term.
