= Prosafe SE =

- Type: Societas Europaea
- Traded as: OSE: PRS
- Industry: Petroleum
- Founded: 1997 as Procon Offshore ASA
- Headquarters: Norway (Global HQ)
- Key people: Glen Rødland (Chairman), Jesper Andersen (Chief Executive Officer)
- Products: Semi-submersible accommodation, service rigs
- Revenue: US $548.7 million (2014)
- Net income: US $178.8 million (2014)
- Total assets: US $1.816.8 billion (end 2014)
- Total equity: US $748.5 million (end 2014)
- Number of employees: 401 (end 2018)
- Website: www.prosafe.com

Prosafe SE is a company specialized in owning/operating semi-submersible accommodation vessels. The company is listed on the Oslo Stock Exchange.

== Operations ==
Prosafe’s operations are related to maintenance and modification of installations on fields already in production, hook-up and commissioning of new fields, tie-backs to existing infrastructure and decommissioning.

Prosafe is listed on the Oslo Stock Exchange with ticker code PRS.

=== Accommodation/service rigs ===
Prosafe owns and operates six semi-submersible Accommodation, Safety and Support Vessels (ASVs) and one Tender Support Vessel (TSV) that can also operate as an accommodation vessel.

Prosafe have an agreement with COSCO shipyard for flexible delivery and long-term financing of two new build harsh environment vessels: Safe Nova and Safe Vega. These vessels are completed and ready for delivery as of 31 December 2022.

The vessels are positioned alongside the host installation and are connected by means of a telescopic gangway so that personnel can walk safely to work.

== History ==
Prosafe was formed in 1997, when the platform drilling and technical services divisions de-merged from Transocean as a separate company and became listed on the Oslo Stock Exchange as Procon Offshore ASA. This company merged with Safe Offshore ASA, thereby entering the business segment of accommodation/service rigs, and changed its name to Prosafe ASA.

Prosafe acquired floating production company Nortrans Offshore in 2001, extending its activities to include the conversion, chartering and operation of FPSOs and FSOs.

In 2005, Prosafe sold the Drilling Services division. In 2006, the company acquired Consafe Offshore AB, which owned three semi-submersible accommodation/service rigs and one accommodation jack-up. This acquisition cemented Prosafe’s leading position in the market for semi-submersible accommodation/service rigs.

In May 2008, Prosafe spun off business division Floating Production. This business division became an independent company, named Prosafe Production Public Limited. On November 25, 2010, BW Offshore completed the 100% acquisition of Prosafe Production Public Ltd., for approximately NOK3,120.92m ($489.88m).
