= Kudu Power Project =

Coordinates: 28.551°S 16.427°E

The Kudu Power Project is a project designed to increase power production in Namibia. The main elements of the project are development of the Kudu gas field and construction of an 800 MW combined cycle natural gas-fired power station at Oranjemund. When completed, the power station will feed Namibian and South African power grids. The project will be developed by NamPower, a national energy company of Namibia.

Of the total 800 MW capacity, approximately 400 MW are foreseen for use in Namibia. This amount would significantly increase the country's current power supply capacity, which stands at 500MW and is mainly dependent on the Ruacana Power Station.

== See also ==
- Kudu gas field
