= Walvis Bay Export Processing Zone =

The Walvis Bay Export Processing Zone (WBEPZMC) is a free trade zone in the coastal city of Walvis Bay, Namibia. Rather than being a specific area or complex, the Zone encompasses the entire city. The Walvis Bay EPZ was opened in 1996, two years after the city rejoined Namibia.
