= BW Offshore =

FPSO owner and operator

BW Offshore Limited
- Type: Public
- Traded as: OSE: BWO
- ISIN: BMG1738J1247
- Industry: Petroleum
- Founded: 1982
- Headquarters: Singapore and Oslo, Norway
- Area served: Global
- Key people: Marco Beenen (CEO)
- Products: FPSO
- Revenue: ▲US$982.4 million (2013)
- Operating income: ▲US$181.4 million (2013)
- Total assets: US$3.4 billion (2013)
- Number of employees: 2,201
- Website: www.bwoffshore.com

BW Offshore Limited is a global owner and operator of floating production storage and offloading (FPSO) vessels. The company is listed on Oslo Stock Exchange. The company has its headquarters in Singapore and Oslo, Norway but operates internationally. The largest owner is BW Group Limited with 49.8% of the shares.

The company operates vessels in Brazil, Mexico, United States, United Kingdom, Russia, Mauritania, Ivory Coast, Nigeria, Gabon, New Zealand, and Indonesia with a total of the 14 FPSOs and 1 FSO.

== History ==
BW Offshore originates from the shipping company Bergesen d.y. ASA who delivered its first FSO Berge Sisar in 1982 which it installed and operated at the Block O field offshore Angola. In 2003 Bergesen was acquired by World-Wide Shipping and was 2005 renamed Bergesen Worldwide. In the same year the floating production part of the company was established as a separate company, Bergesen Worldwide Offshore. In 2006 the company was rebranded BW Offshore and listed on the Oslo Stock Exchange.

In 2007, BW Offshore acquired the ownership of Advanced Production and Loading (APL), making the company its technology division. APL which is based in Arendal, Norway and is a specialist in the engineering and supply of offloading and transfer systems for ships and terminals. It has delivered loading equipment for production vessels, storage vessels and shuttle tankers in the North Sea, Africa, Asia, Oceania, Russia, Latin-America, and the USA. In 2006, APL ventured into FPSO contracting by establishing Nexus Floating Production that consequently also became controlled by BW Offshore. In 2010, BW Offshore sold APL to National Oilwell Varco.

In 2010, BW Offshore Limited completed the acquisition of remaining 76.12% stake in Prosafe Production Public Ltd. Prior to the transaction, BW Offshore Limited owned 23.88% and hence, completed the 100% acquisition of Prosafe Production.

== Presence and Units ==
As of December 31, 2013, BW Offshore owned a fleet of 14 FPSOs, 1 FSO and 1 FPSO conversion candidate (Blue Opal). It also operates 2 FPSOs owned by oil companies.

In May 2014, BW Offshore was selected by Premier Oil to execute the engineering, procurement, construction, installation and operation of a new built FPSO for its Catcher field in the UK North Sea.

On 28 Aug 2017, Premier Oil's Catcher FPSO left the Keppel Shipyard in Singapore for the Catcher field in the UK North Sea. The BW Offshore vessel was expected to reach its final destination in the final quarter of 2017, for a seven-year fixed term contract with Premier Oil

=== Fleet ===
| FPSO Vessel Name | Oilfield | Location | Operator | Contract Duration | Water depth (m) | Status |
|---|---|---|---|---|---|---|
| BW Adolo (formerly Azurite) | Dussafu | Gabon | BW Energy | 2018 - | 115 | |
| Pioneer | Cascade & Chinook | (United States) Gulf of Mexico | Petrobrás América | 2012 - 2017 | 2600 | |
| YÙUM K'AK'NÀAB | Ku-Maloob-Zaap | Mexico | Pemex | 2007 - 2022 | 90 | |
| Berge Helene | Chinguetti | Mauritania | Petronas | 2006 - 2017 | 850 | Contract terminated |
| Sendje Berge | Okwori | Nigeria | Addax/Sinopec | 2005 - 2018 | 140 | |
| Abo | Abo | Nigeria | ENI | 2003 - 2016 | 800 | |
| Espoir Ivorien | Espoir | Ivory Coast | CNR | 2002 - 2017 | 118 | Sold to CNR in 2023 |
| Petroleo Nautipa | Etame | Gabon | Vaalco | 2002 - 2020 | 80 | |
| BW Cidade de São Vicente | Lula South | Brazil | Petrobrás | 2009 - 2019 | 2140 | |
| Cidade de São Mateus | Camarupim | Brazil | Petrobrás | 2009 - 2018 | 763 | Disconnected due to accident |
| Polvo | Polvo | Brazil | HRT | 2007 - 2021 | 85 | Terminated |
| Peregrino (Operations) | Peregrino | Brazil | Statoil | 2013 - 2016 | 120 | Termination contract with Statoil completed |
| P-63 (Operations) | Papa Terra | Brazil | Petrobrás | 2013 - 2016 | 1150 | |
| Belokamenka | Murmansk | Russia | Rosneft Oil Company | 2004 - 2015 | 30 | Disconnected |
| BW Athena | Athena | (United Kingdom) UK | Ithaca Energy | 2012 - 2020 | 130 | Demobilised Feb 2016 |
| BW Joko Tole | Terang Sirasun Batur (TSB) | Indonesia | Kangean Energy | 2012 - 2022 | 100 | |
| Umuroa | TUI | New Zealand | AWE | 2007 - 2019 | 120 | Terminated |
| BW Catcher | Catcher | (United Kingdom) UK | Harbour Energy | 2018 - 2030 | 90 | |
| BW Opal | Barossa | (Australia) | Santos | 2025-2040 (2050) | | |
