= Leon Jooste =

Namibian politician and businessperson

Minister of Public Enterprises
- In office 21 March 2015 – 31 March 2022
- President: Hage Geingob
- Preceded by: position established
- Succeeded by: position abolished

Deputy Minister for Environment and Tourism
- In office 2005 – 19 January 2009
- President: Hifikepunye Pohamba

Deputy Minister for Local and Regional Government
- In office 2004–2005
- President: Sam Nujoma

Personal details
- Born: 18 February 1969 (age 57) Grootfontein, South West Africa (now Namibia)
- Party: SWAPO
- Education: University of Stellenbosch
- Occupation: Archaeologist

Leon Jooste (born 18 February 1969 in Grootfontein, Otjozondjupa Region) is a Namibian politician and businessperson who served as Minister of Public Enterprises until 1 December 2022.

== Education and early life ==
Jooste attended school at Paul Roos Gymnasium in Stellenbosch and at Abbott's College in Cape Town, both South Africa. In 1991 he graduated from Stellenbosch University with a BA in archaeology and anthropology. He is a professional helicopter pilot since 1993, and upon his return to Namibia became managing director of Eden Wildlife Trust, a tourism enterprise near Grootfontein.

== Political career ==
A member of SWAPO, Jooste was appointed to replace Gerhard Tötemeyer in the National Assembly of Namibia in 2004. He had not been placed high enough on the SWAPO Party list in the 2004 general election to directly enter Parliament after the election. Jooste was appointed Deputy Minister for Local and Regional Government the same year. In 2005, he was shifted to the Environment and Tourism portfolio in Hifikepunye Pohamba's first cabinet, again as deputy minister.

Jooste resigned in late 2009 in order to take over the family business in Cape Town after the death of his father.

Under president Hage Geingob, Jooste was appointed as Minister of Public Enterprises in March 2015. Decisions under his reign were often controversial and unpopular and included the closures of state-owned Air Namibia and the Road Contractor's Company. In 2021 he suggested that the ministry he heads should be downgraded to a department within the Ministry of Finance, effectively abolishing his own ministerial position.

Jooste resigned as member of Parliament and cabinet minister on 31 March 2022. He had served in Parliament from 2004 to 2006, from 2015 till 2020, and from 2020 till 2022. He was replaced by Ephraim Nekongo (SWAPO), effectively on 9 May 2022.
