= Namibian Ports Authority =

The Namibian Ports Authority (Namport) is a state owned enterprise established by an act of parliament as the national port authority of Namibia, managing principally the ports of Walvis Bay and Lüderitz, as well as managing a Syncrolift dry dock facility in Walvis Bay. Namport was founded in 1994. Its head office is located in Walvis Bay.

== Port of Walvis Bay ==
Walvis Bay is Namibia's largest commercial port, handling on average 3,000 vessel calls per year and over 5.3 million tons of cargo. Facilities at the port include a container terminal, privately operated bulk cargo terminal and six tugboats. The expansion of the port will commence in 2012 to increase container storage capacity to 900,000 TEU's. There is a Syncrolift dry dock facility at Walvis Bay harbor, for lifting ships out of the water for repair, separate from the port facilities proper. Walvis bay is linked to landlocked SADC countries via road corridors mainly the Trans Caprivi, Trans Kalahari, Trans Kunene and Trans Oranje.

== Port of Lüderitz ==
Lüderitz Port is historically Namibia's second largest port, functioning mainly as a fishing port; it has expanded in recent years to ship cargo from the mining industry and to support and service offshore petroleum exploration and diamond mining activities.

== See also ==
- Port authority
- Port operator
- Mining in Namibia
- Transport in Namibia
