= Walvis Bay =

Coastal town in Namibia

Walvis Bay Walvisbaai (Afrikaans) Walfischbucht or Walfischbai (German) Ezorongondo (Otjiherero)
- City
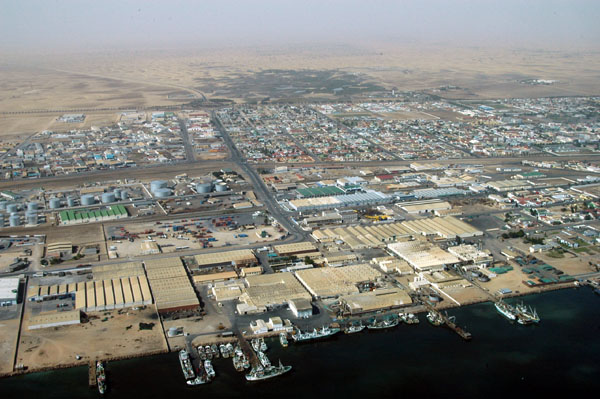
- An aerial view of Walvis Bay

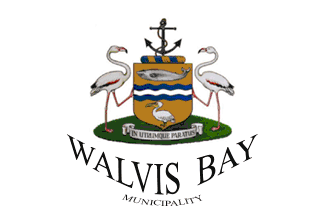
- Flag Coat of arms
- Nicknames: Walvis, Windwaai Baai
- Motto: In utrumque paratus (Latin for "Prepared for either")
- Location within Namibia Walvis Bay (Africa)
- Coordinates: 22°57′22″S 14°30′29″E
- Country: Namibia
- Region: Erongo
- Founded: 1790s

Government
  - Mayor: Trevino Forbes (IPC)
  - Deputy Mayor: Saara Mutondoka (IPC)

Area
  - Total: 1,124 km^{2} (434 sq mi)

Population (2023 census)
  - Total: 102,704
  - Density: 91.37/km^{2} (236.7/sq mi)
- Time zone: UTC+2 (SAST)
- Climate: BWk

Designations

Ramsar Wetland
- Designated: 23 August 1995
- Reference no.: 742

Walvis Bay (Afrikaans: Walvisbaai; German: Walfischbucht or Walfischbai) is a city in Namibia and the name of the bay on which it lies. It is the second largest city in Namibia and the largest coastal city in the country. The city covers an area of 29 square kilometres (11 sq mi) of land. The bay is a haven for sea vessels due to its harbour, protected by the Pelican Point sand spit, which is the only natural deep-water harbour along the country's coast. Being rich in plankton and marine life, these waters also draw large numbers of southern right whales, attracting whalers and fishing vessels.

A succession of colonists developed the location and resources of this strategic harbour settlement. The harbour's value about the sea route around the Cape of Good Hope had caught the attention of world powers since it was discovered by the outside world in 1485. The importance of the harbour, combined with its extreme isolation by land, explains the complicated political history of the town. For much of its history, Walvis Bay was governed as an exclave separate from the rest of the territory that today is Namibia.

The town is situated just north of the Tropic of Capricorn in the Kuiseb River delta and lies at the end of the TransNamib Railway to Windhoek, and on B2 road.

Walvis Bay, with its large bay and dunes, is an important centre of tourism activity in Namibia. Attractions include the artificial Bird Island, centre of a guano collection industry, the Dune 7 dune, the salt works, the abundant birdlife, and a museum. Kuisebmund Stadium, home to two clubs in the Namibia Premier League, is also located in the city. The beach resort of Langstrand lies just a few kilometres north. The Walvis Bay Export Processing Zone is an important facet of the local economy.

== Etymology ==
The Dutch referred to it as Walvisch Baye and the English as Whale Bay. In its eventual formal incorporation, it was named Walfish Bay, which was changed to Walvish Bay, and ultimately to Walvis Bay. It has also been referred to as Walwich Bay or Walwisch Bay. The Herero people of the area called it Ezorongondo.

== History ==
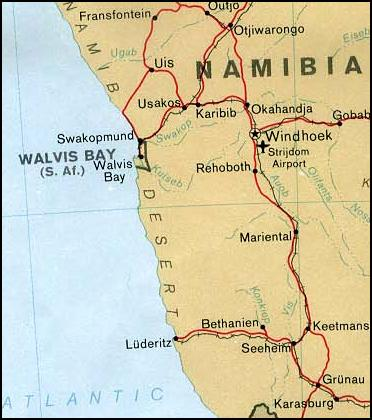
Map showing location of Walvis Bay and reference to South Africa before the handover to Namibia

Portuguese navigator Diogo Cão reached Cape Cross, north of the bay, in 1485. There followed Bartolomeu Dias, who anchored his flagship São Cristóvão in what is now Walvis Bay on 8 December 1487, on his expedition to discover a sea route to the East via the Cape of Good Hope. He named the bay "O Golfo de Santa Maria da Conceição". However, the Portuguese did not formally stake a claim to Walvis Bay.

Walvis Bay was founded at the end of the 18th century as a stopover for sea travel between Cape Town and the Netherlands by the Dutch East India Company. No permanent (year-round) settlement was attempted and little commercial development occurred on the site until the late 19th century. In the meantime, the Cape Colony had become British, and during the Scramble for Africa, the British claimed Walvis Bay. They permitted the Cape Colony to complete the annexation of the territory in 1884, together with the Penguin Islands, following initial steps that had been taken in 1878. The land surrounding the territory was annexed by the German Empire as German South West Africa.

In 1910, Walvis Bay, as an exclave of the Cape Colony, became part of the newly formed Union of South Africa. A boundary dispute with Germany was settled in 1911, with Walvis Bay having a confirmed area of 1,124 square kilometres (434 sq mi).

Directly controlled land (including Walvis Bay) of the former Union of South Africa

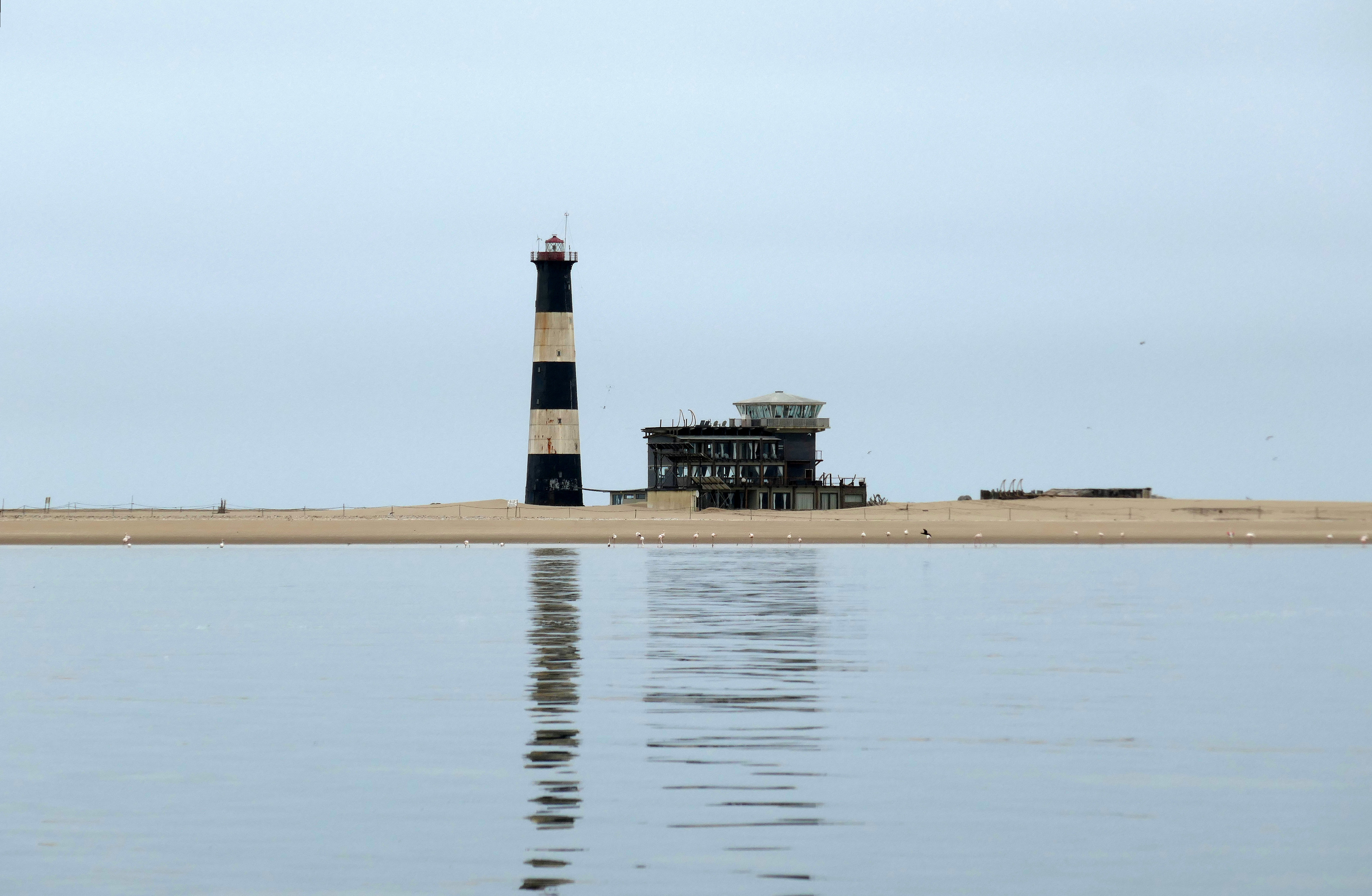
Pelican Point, Lighthouse and Lodge (2014)

The exclave was overrun by the Germans during the South West Africa Campaign early in the First World War, but the Union Defence Force (UDF) of South Africa eventually ousted the Germans in 1915. Subsequently, Walvis Bay was quickly integrated into the new martial law regime in South West Africa.

South Africa was later awarded control (a Class "C" mandate) over South West Africa by the League of Nations to administer the territory. Civilian rule was restored in South West Africa in 1921 and the administration of Walvis Bay was transferred to South West Africa under the South West Africa Affairs Act of 1922.

Despite the territory never having been part of German South West Africa, the Act stated that: "the port and settlement of Walvis Bay, which forms part of the Cape of Good Hope, shall for judicial and administrative purposes be regarded as if it were part of the mandated territory of South West Africa". However, South Africa had also sought to annex South West Africa itself and had presented such a proposal to the League of Nations. Consequently, in 1949, the Act was amended to give representation in the Parliament of South Africa to whites in South West Africa.

On 14 December 1971, the Namibian general contract workers strike began in Walvis Bay, after starting the day before in Windhoek. The goal of the strike was the abolition of the contract labour system, to oppose apartheid, and promote Namibia's independence.

In 1977, following increasing international pressure to relinquish its control over South West Africa, South Africa repealed the Act, but transferred control of Walvis Bay back to the Cape Province, thereby making it an exclave. From 1980, it was represented in both the Provincial Council and the House of Assembly as part of the Green Point constituency in Cape Town, before becoming a separate constituency in 1982.

In response, the United Nations Security Council passed Resolution 432 (1978), which declared that "the territorial integrity and unity of Namibia must be assured through the reintegration of Walvis Bay within its territory".

In 1990, South West Africa gained independence as Namibia, but Walvis Bay remained under South African sovereignty, with South Africa increasing the number of troops. However, in 1992, the two countries agreed to establish a transitional Joint Administrative Authority for Walvis Bay and the Offshore Islands. The Authority was headed by two Chief Executive Officers, Nangolo Mbumba, then Secretary to the Namibian Cabinet, and Carl von Hirschberg, former South African Ambassador to the United Nations.

In August 1993, prior to the end of apartheid, the Multiparty Negotiating Forum in South Africa passed a resolution calling for "the incorporation-reintegration of Walvis Bay and the Off-Shore Islands into Namibia." The Transfer of Walvis Bay to Namibia Act was passed by the Parliament of South Africa that year. Following the signing of a treaty between the two countries, South Africa formally transferred sovereignty of Walvis Bay and the Penguin Islands to Namibia on 1 March 1994.

== Geography ==
=== Suburbs ===
Due to its South African administration, Walvis Bay was developed as a segregated town. The suburb of Kuisebmond, located 3.2 kilometres (1.8 mi) northeast of Walvis Bay city centre, housed Black people; Narraville, located 3.3 kilometres (2 mi) east northeast of Walvis Bay city centre, was inhabited by Coloureds; and Whites lived in the city centre.

After the incorporation of the town into Namibia, many people have settled in shacks around it. In an effort to reduce the impact of the informal settlements, the municipality formed the Tutaleni Housing Project to the northeast.

=== Climate ===
Despite its location within the tropics, Walvis Bay features the very rare mild variation of the cold desert climate (BWk) according to the Köppen climate classification. It is caused by the rain shadow of the Naukluft Mountains and the cooling effect of the coastal sea temperature by the Benguela Current. Walvis Bay receives only 13.2 millimetres (0.52 in) average precipitation per year, making it one of the driest cities on Earth. Despite its dry climate, the city is relatively humid. Average relative humidity throughout the year remains above 80%. The warmest month is February with an average temperature 17.9 °C (64.2 °F), while the coolest months are August and September with average temperature 13.2 °C (55.8 °F). The diurnal temperature range is also low, averaging only 5.7 °C (10.3 °F).

A weather station operated on the Pelican Point headland from 1958 to 1984. Unusually, the highest temperatures are not recorded during the summer; autumn, spring, and even winter have all seen higher temperatures than the hottest days in summer. These record highs occur when offshore winds blow downwards from the high plateau inland and are nonetheless mild by comparison to many other cities in the tropics at the same latitude. Higher temperatures have been recorded, even just slightly inland, such as a report of 42.8 °C (109.0 °F) at the airport on 15 April 2016.

Climate data for Pelican Point, Walvis Bay (7 m), Namibia
| Month | Jan | Feb | Mar | Apr | May | Jun | Jul | Aug | Sep | Oct | Nov | Dec | Year |
|---|---|---|---|---|---|---|---|---|---|---|---|---|---|
| Record high °C (°F) | 25.3 (77.5) | 26.4 (79.5) | 34.5 (94.1) | 35.0 (95.0) | 36.0 (96.8) | 32.5 (90.5) | 32.9 (91.2) | 33.4 (92.1) | 31.3 (88.3) | 27.5 (81.5) | 28.3 (82.9) | 25.5 (77.9) | 36.0 (96.8) |
| Mean daily maximum °C (°F) | 20.0 (68.0) | 20.3 (68.5) | 19.6 (67.3) | 18.6 (65.5) | 19.0 (66.2) | 18.8 (65.8) | 17.8 (64.0) | 16.4 (61.5) | 15.8 (60.4) | 16.6 (61.9) | 17.7 (63.9) | 19.0 (66.2) | 18.3 (64.9) |
| Daily mean °C (°F) | 17.6 (63.7) | 17.9 (64.2) | 17.2 (63.0) | 15.7 (60.3) | 15.6 (60.1) | 15.2 (59.4) | 14.1 (57.4) | 13.2 (55.8) | 13.2 (55.8) | 14.0 (57.2) | 15.3 (59.5) | 16.6 (61.9) | 15.5 (59.9) |
| Mean daily minimum °C (°F) | 15.2 (59.4) | 15.5 (59.9) | 14.7 (58.5) | 12.9 (55.2) | 12.1 (53.8) | 11.4 (52.5) | 10.3 (50.5) | 10.1 (50.2) | 10.7 (51.3) | 11.5 (52.7) | 12.9 (55.2) | 14.2 (57.6) | 12.6 (54.7) |
| Record low °C (°F) | 10.5 (50.9) | 9.2 (48.6) | 10.5 (50.9) | 8.5 (47.3) | 7.0 (44.6) | 5.0 (41.0) | 3.4 (38.1) | 4.4 (39.9) | 6.1 (43.0) | 5.0 (41.0) | 8.5 (47.3) | 9.6 (49.3) | 3.4 (38.1) |
| Average precipitation mm (inches) | 1.0 (0.04) | 2.0 (0.08) | 5.0 (0.20) | 1.0 (0.04) | 1.0 (0.04) | 2.0 (0.08) | 0.0 (0.0) | 0.2 (0.01) | 0.1 (0.00) | 0.1 (0.00) | 0.7 (0.03) | 0.1 (0.00) | 13.2 (0.52) |
| Average precipitation days (≥ 0.1 mm) | 0.6 | 0.8 | 1.1 | 0.5 | 0.4 | 0.5 | 0.0 | 0.4 | 0.5 | 0.4 | 0.6 | 0.4 | 6.2 |
| Average relative humidity (%) | 87 | 87 | 89 | 89 | 86 | 81 | 82 | 86 | 89 | 88 | 88 | 88 | 87 |
| Mean monthly sunshine hours | 232 | 189 | 211 | 237 | 251 | 231 | 236 | 220 | 189 | 226 | 210 | 214 | 2,646 |
Source 1: Deutscher Wetterdienst
Source 2: Danish Meteorological Institute

Climate data for Walvis Bay International Airport (2000-2025 normals)
| Month | Jan | Feb | Mar | Apr | May | Jun | Jul | Aug | Sep | Oct | Nov | Dec | Year |
|---|---|---|---|---|---|---|---|---|---|---|---|---|---|
| Mean daily maximum °C (°F) | 25.0 (77.0) | 26.0 (78.8) | 26.8 (80.2) | 26.7 (80.1) | 26.8 (80.2) | 25.6 (78.1) | 25.6 (78.1) | 22.9 (73.2) | 21.9 (71.4) | 22.9 (73.2) | 24.0 (75.2) | 24.5 (76.1) | 24.9 (76.8) |
| Daily mean °C (°F) | 21.5 (70.7) | 22.2 (72.0) | 22.4 (72.3) | 21.3 (70.3) | 20.4 (68.7) | 19.6 (67.3) | 19.2 (66.6) | 17.2 (63.0) | 16.8 (62.2) | 18.2 (64.8) | 19.5 (67.1) | 20.7 (69.3) | 19.9 (67.8) |
| Mean daily minimum °C (°F) | 17.5 (63.5) | 18.3 (64.9) | 17.3 (63.1) | 15.3 (59.5) | 14.3 (57.7) | 13.2 (55.8) | 12.1 (53.8) | 11.5 (52.7) | 11.5 (52.7) | 13.2 (55.8) | 14.7 (58.5) | 16.5 (61.7) | 14.6 (58.3) |
Source: Infoclimat.fr

== Demographics ==
Historical population
| Year | Pop. | ±% |
|---|---|---|
| 1991 | 22,999 | — |
| 2001 | 43,611 | +89.6% |
| 2011 | 62,096 | +42.4% |
| 2023 | 102,704 | +65.4% |

As of the 2023 census, Walvis Bay has a population of 102,704, with significant growth from 62,096 in 2011 and 43,611 in 2001. This expansion is largely attributed to internal migration, particularly from Namibia's northern regions, driven by employment opportunities in the port and fishing industries.

The city is characterized by its diverse population, encompassing various ethnic groups such as the Aakwanyama, Aandonga, Ovaherero, Damara, Nama, and others. Languages commonly spoken include English, Afrikaans, German, Oshiwambo, and Damara.

Walvis Bay's urban landscape includes suburbs like Kuisebmond, historically designated for Black residents during apartheid, and Narraville, which was inhabited by Coloureds. Post-independence, the city has experienced rapid urbanization, leading to the development of informal settlements. To address housing challenges, the municipality initiated the Tutaleni Housing Project, providing affordable housing with basic amenities.

== Economy ==
=== Tourism ===
Popular tourist sights around Walvis Bay

Tourism has had an increasing influence in the town's economy, with international tourists arriving at its airport and port facilities. Several cruise liners visit the port each year. With many tourism activities hosted by small and large tour operators the town has turned into a tourism destination.

=== Fishing ===
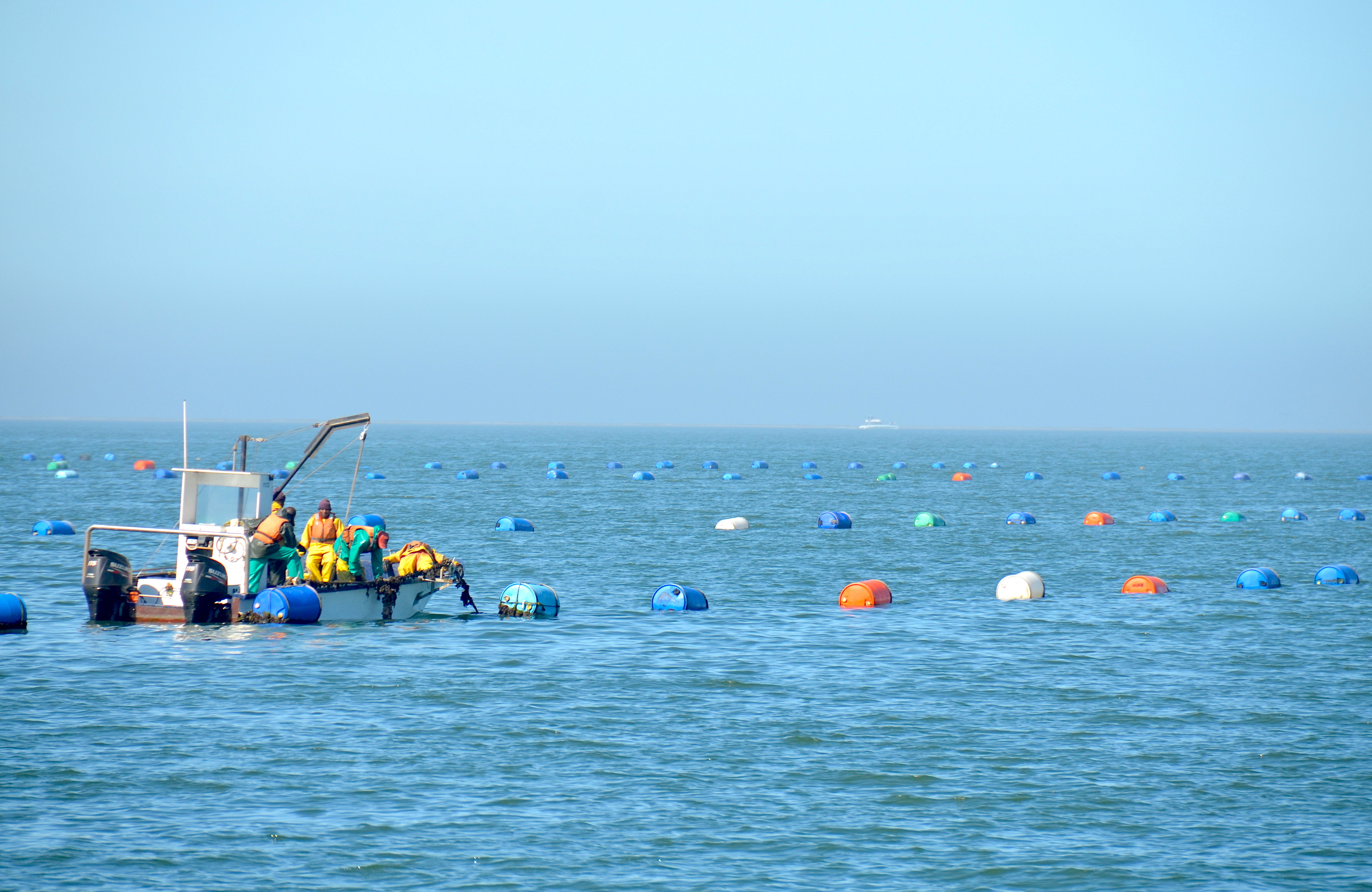
Oysters are cultivated for export at Walvis Bay

In Walvis Bay there are a variety of fishing companies like Hangana Seafood, Caroline Fishing, Benguella Fishing Company, Cadilu Fishing, Etosha Fisheries, Kuiseb Fishing Enterprises, Blue Ocean Products, Benguella Sea Products, Consortium Fisheries, Talanam Fish Processor. These companies catch diverse types of fish, like snoek, horse mackerel, anchovy, white steenbras, kabeljou, kingklip, hake, catfish, tuna, and sardines. Hangana Seafood are processors and exporters of fish and fish products. As such, the fishing enterprise accounts for a major part of Walvis Bay's economy.

In May 2018, a spokesman for the National Fishing Corporation of Namibia (Fishcor), confirmed that a new N$530 million onshore processing plant would be operational by September 2018. After completion, the factory (which plans to employ 700 people of which 70% will be female), promises to be the largest pelagic processing plant in sub-Saharan Africa and will process about 80 000 tonnes of fish per annum.

=== Manufacturing ===
In March 2018, the Namibian government in association with French Groupe PSA signed an investment agreement to initiate a joint-venture to assemble Opel and Peugeot vehicles in Walvis Bay. The N$190m-project has been earmarked to commence in 2018 with a forecasted annual target volume of 5000 units by 2020, a target carried by SACU countries' market demand. However, Peugeot threatened to close the plant over disputes with South Africa over import tariffs.

Walvis Bay Salt produces approximately 1 million tons of salt per year through solar evaporation of sea water. Most of the salt is for industrial use but the company also produces table salt under the "Cerebos" brand.

== Transport ==
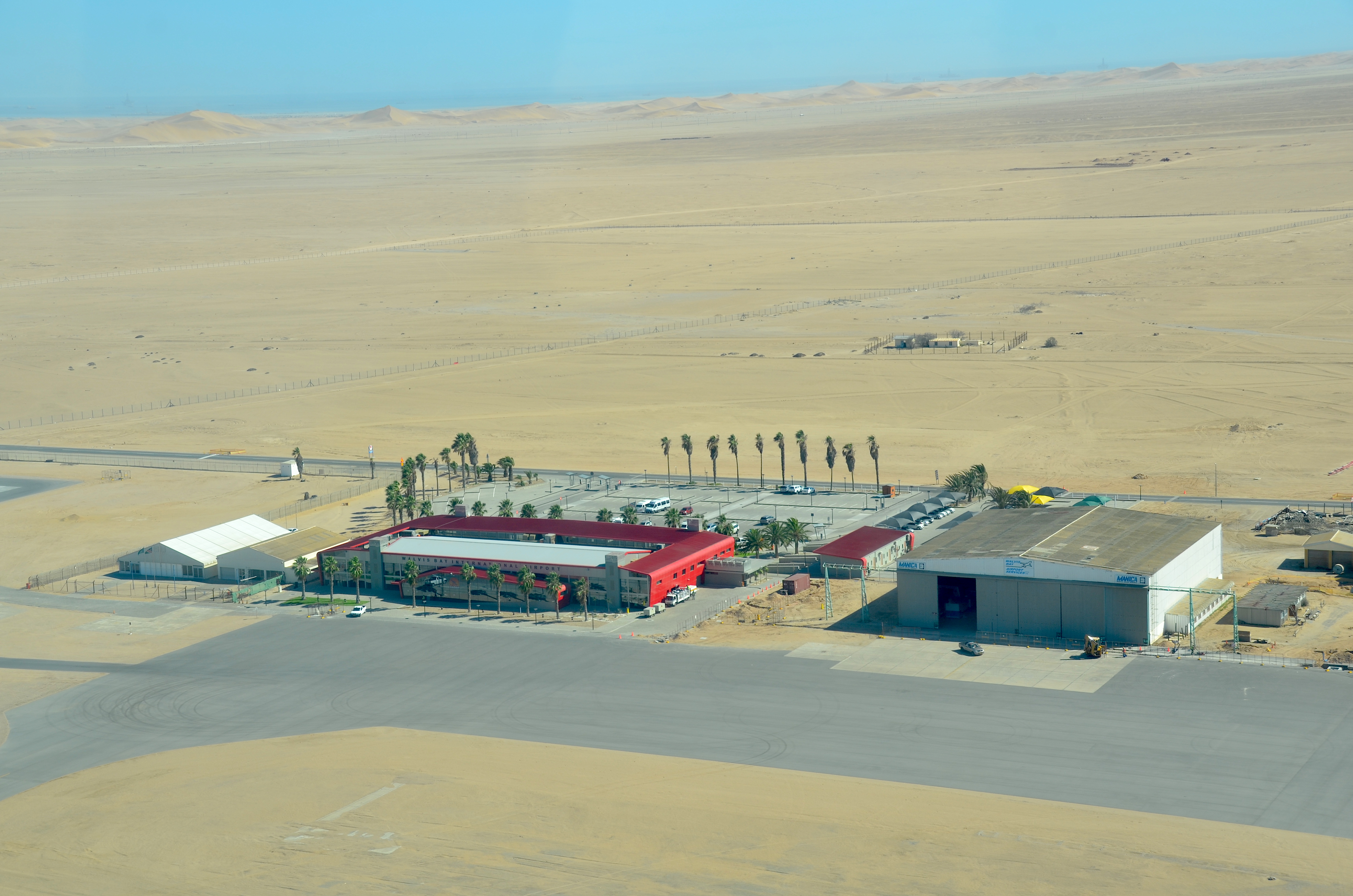
Walvis Bay International Airport

Walvis Bay is an important logistical port for the southern African region, providing port facilities for the import and export of cargo for the rest of Namibia, Zambia, Democratic Republic of Congo, and Botswana. Since the Walvis Bay Corridor Group (WBCG) was established in 2000, cargo moving through the port has increased from 30,000 containers a year to 370,000 containers in 2016. As of 2017 the port was being upgraded to increase its capacity to move 1 million containers a year by 2019. Bureaucratic and logistical problems at the city's competitor port at Durban, South Africa have diverted traffic to the port at Walvis Bay. Ninety-five percent of all cargo hauled overland through Walvis Bay is carried by truck.

The Walvis Bay Corridor Group is gearing up to increase import/export-business opportunities in Namibia. The Namibian National Development Plan expects to complete the expansion programme of the Walvis Bay port by 2019. Because of the harbour's geographical positioning, authorities plan to gain a footprint in providing landlocked Southern African Development Community (SADC) countries with a vital logistical hub. In addition to the importance of the port, development would strengthen trade corridors which consists of current road and rail networks.

In an attempt to strengthen and enhance trade relations between other African countries, Namport (the Namibian Port Authority) in April 2019 signed a five-year MoU (Memorandum of Understanding) with the Port Authority of Dakar, Senegal.

Walvis Bay International Airport provides commercial flight services to the city's residents, as well as to neighbouring towns and villages. Airlink services flights between South Africa and Walvis Bay.

In August 2019, a new container terminal was opened, built on a 40-acre platform reclaimed from the sea. The terminal was built by the state-owned China Harbour Engineering Company with funds from the Namibian government and the African Development Bank, costing N$4.2b.

This increases the capacity of the port to 750,000 containers per year from 350,000. The terminal also includes a dedicated cruise liner berth.

== Education ==
Walvis Bay has a number of public (government-run), semi-public, and private schools. Among them are Duneside High School, Duinesig Primary School, International School of Walvis Bay, The Dolphin Schools, Alexanders Private School, Kuisebmond Secondary School, Walvis Bay Private School and others. A number of kindergartens cater to young children.

The Namibian Maritime and Fisheries Institute (NAMFI) is a tertiary education institution based in town. International University of Management (IUM), Welwitchia Health Training Center and Monitronics Success College both have branches in Walvis Bay.

== Politics ==
Walvis Bay is governed by a municipal council that has ten seats.

=== Election results ===
The 2015 local authority election was won by the SWAPO party which gained eight seats (5,818 votes). One seat each was won by the Democratic Turnhalle Alliance (DTA, 565 votes) and the United Democratic Front (UDF, 433 votes).

The 2020 local authority election was won by the Independent Patriots for Change (IPC), an opposition party formed in August 2020. The IPC obtained 5,043 votes and gained four seats. SWAPO was the runner-up, obtaining 3,348 votes and gaining three seats. One seat each went to the Landless People's Movement (LPM, a new party registered in 2018, 1,207 votes), the local Joint Walvis Bay Residents Association with 945 votes, and the Popular Democratic Movement (PDM, the new name of the DTA) with 658 votes.

On 28 November 2024, Trevino Forbes of IPC was re-elected as the mayor of Walvis Bay at a special council meeting.

=== Twin towns – sister cities ===
Walvis Bay is twinned with:

- Lobatse in Botswana
- Drakenstein in South Africa
- Kristiansand in Norway.

== Culture ==
=== Sports ===
Walvis Bay contains open spaces including the Walvis Bay Lagoon and Kuiseb River Delta. These spaces are used for outdoor activities such as sandboarding, kiting, surfing, swimming, angling, sailing, golf and other indoor and outdoor sports.

The two-kilometre (1 1/4-mile) sand spit allows the adjacent water to remain smooth in very strong winds, ideal for record attempting vessels like that by the Vestas Sailrocket. The ocean side of the sand spit has a world-famous surf spot known in the international surf media as "Skeleton Bay."

The city is home to Eleven Arrows F.C. and Blue Waters F.C., football clubs that compete in the Namibia Premier Football League, and the Sparta Cricket Club Ground.

=== Places of worship ===
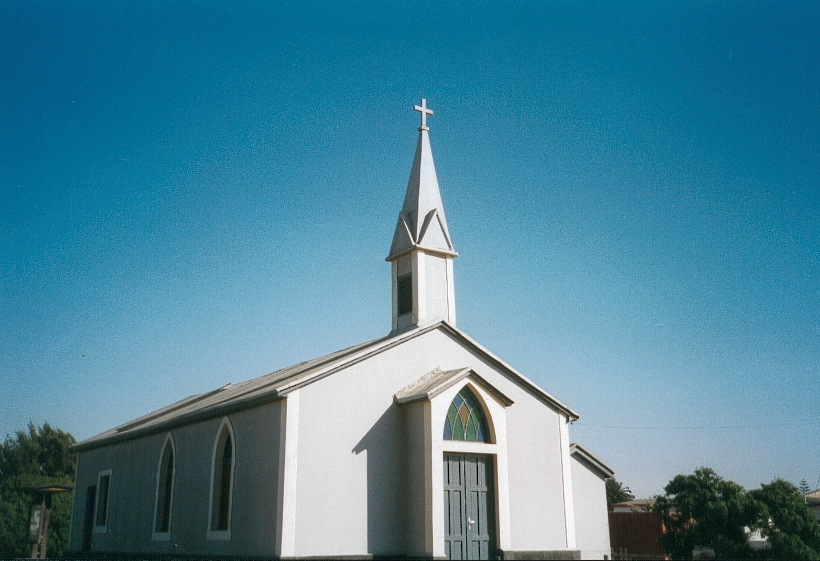
Old Rhenish Mission Church, Walvis Bay

Among the places of worship, they are predominantly Christian churches and temples: Evangelical Lutheran Church in Namibia (Lutheran World Federation), Evangelical Lutheran Church in the Republic of Namibia (Lutheran World Federation), Baptist Convention of Namibia (Baptist World Alliance), Assemblies of God, Catholic Church. In addition to that there are also Anglican Churches namely St Raphael Anglican Church in Mondesa, St Mathews Anglican Church close to Namport as well as Seafarers Mission at Namport. There is also a Muslim mosque.

=== Film ===
The Namibian film Walvis Tale is set in Walvis Bay. The documentary explores the bond between the people of Walvis Bay and the sea that supports their way of life, all the while addressing broader themes of identity, sustainability and heritage.

== Conservation ==
Walvis Bay is the home of non-profit environmental organization, Ocean Conservation Namibia (OCN). In September 2024, OCN held a Walvis Bay community cleanup, an initiative aimed at addressing the growing issue of marine pollution and protecting local wildlife.

== Notable people ==
- Neshani Andreas (1964–2011), writer, teacher, and American Peace Corps manager.
- Niko Bessinger (1948–2008), politician and independence activist.
- Otto Herrigel (1937–2013), businessman and politician; first Minister of Finance, 1990 and 1992.
- Derek Klazen (born 1965), politician and former mayor of Walvis Bay, minister of fisheries and marine resources
- Uilika Nambahu, politician, mayor of Walvis Bay in 2008
- Top Cheri (born 1991), singer and entrepreneur.
- Omar van Reenen, LGBT activist, junior mayor of Walvis from 2014 to 2015, and served as Vice President of The State University of New York Student Assembly from 2020 to 2021

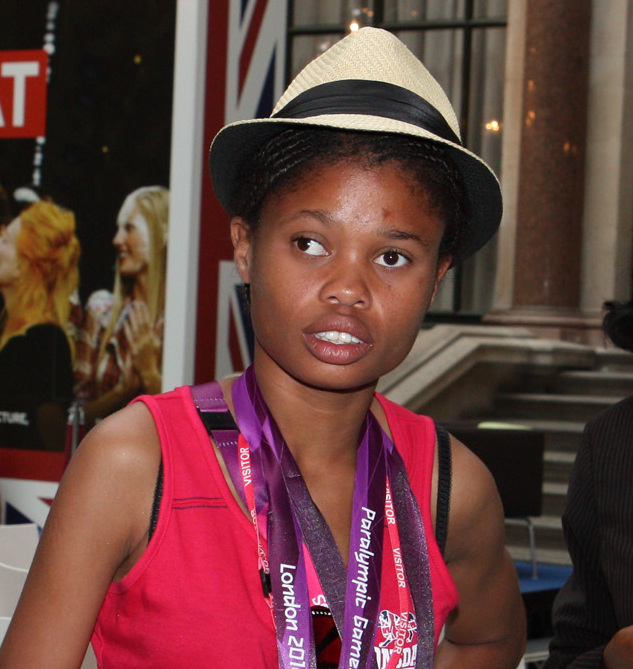
Johanna Benson, 2012

=== Sport ===
- Johanna Benson (born 1990), Paralympic gold medalist in the T37 long jump
- Chrysander Botha (born 1988), rugby union player with 55 caps for Namibia
- Shalako & Zhivago Groenewald (born 1993), former first-class cricketers.
- Percy Montgomery (born 1974), former rugby player, with 102 caps with South Africa.
- Harry Simon (born 1971), former professional boxer.
- Hendrik Somaeb (born 1992), footballer with 30 caps for Namibia
- Damian Stevens (born 1995), rugby union player with 25 caps for Namibia
- Marius Visser (born 1982), rugby union player with 18 caps for Namibia

== Gallery ==
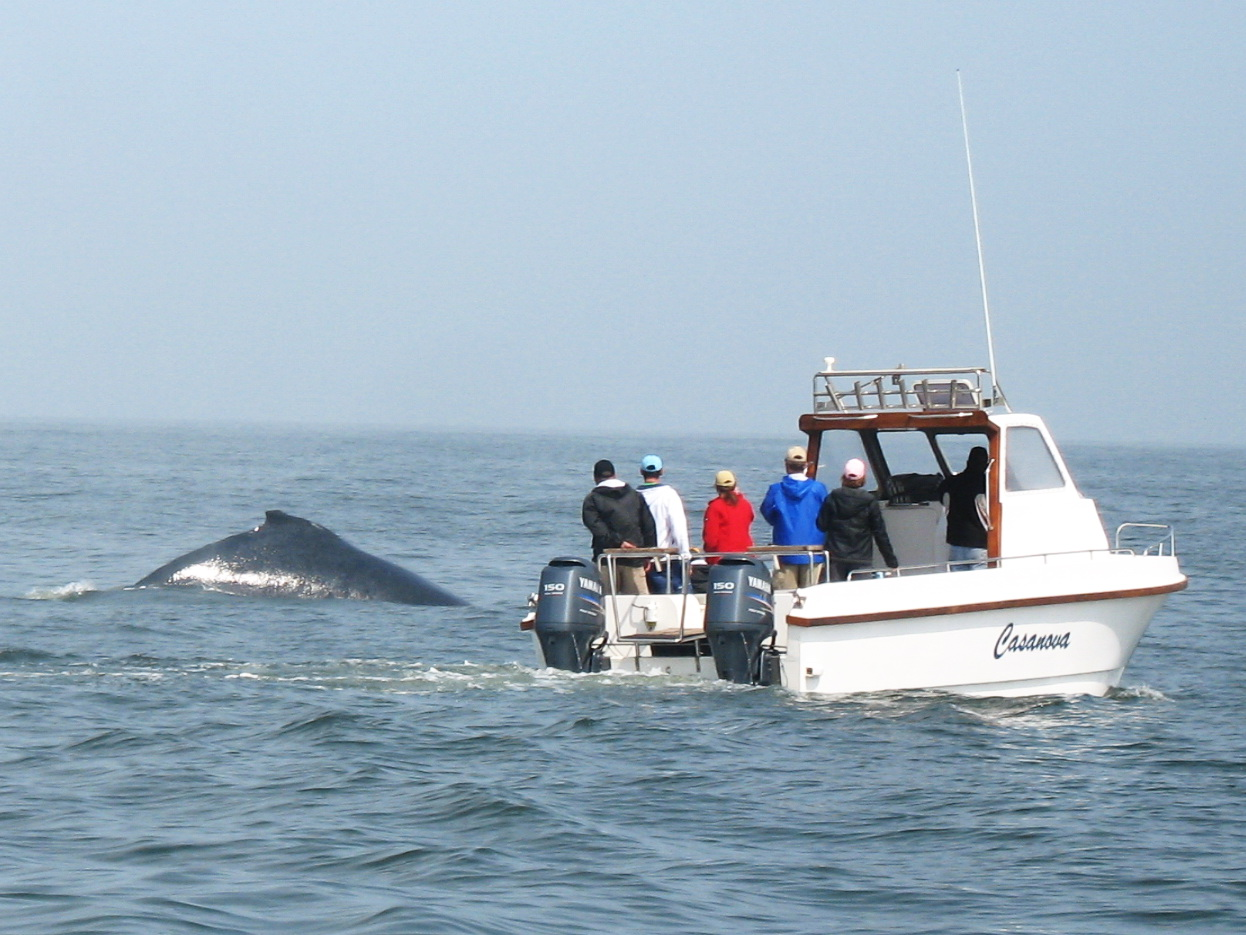
Watching humpback whale in Walvis Bay

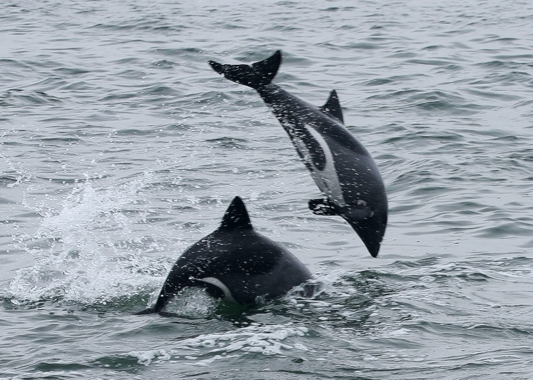
Heaviside's dolphins jumping off Walvis Bay

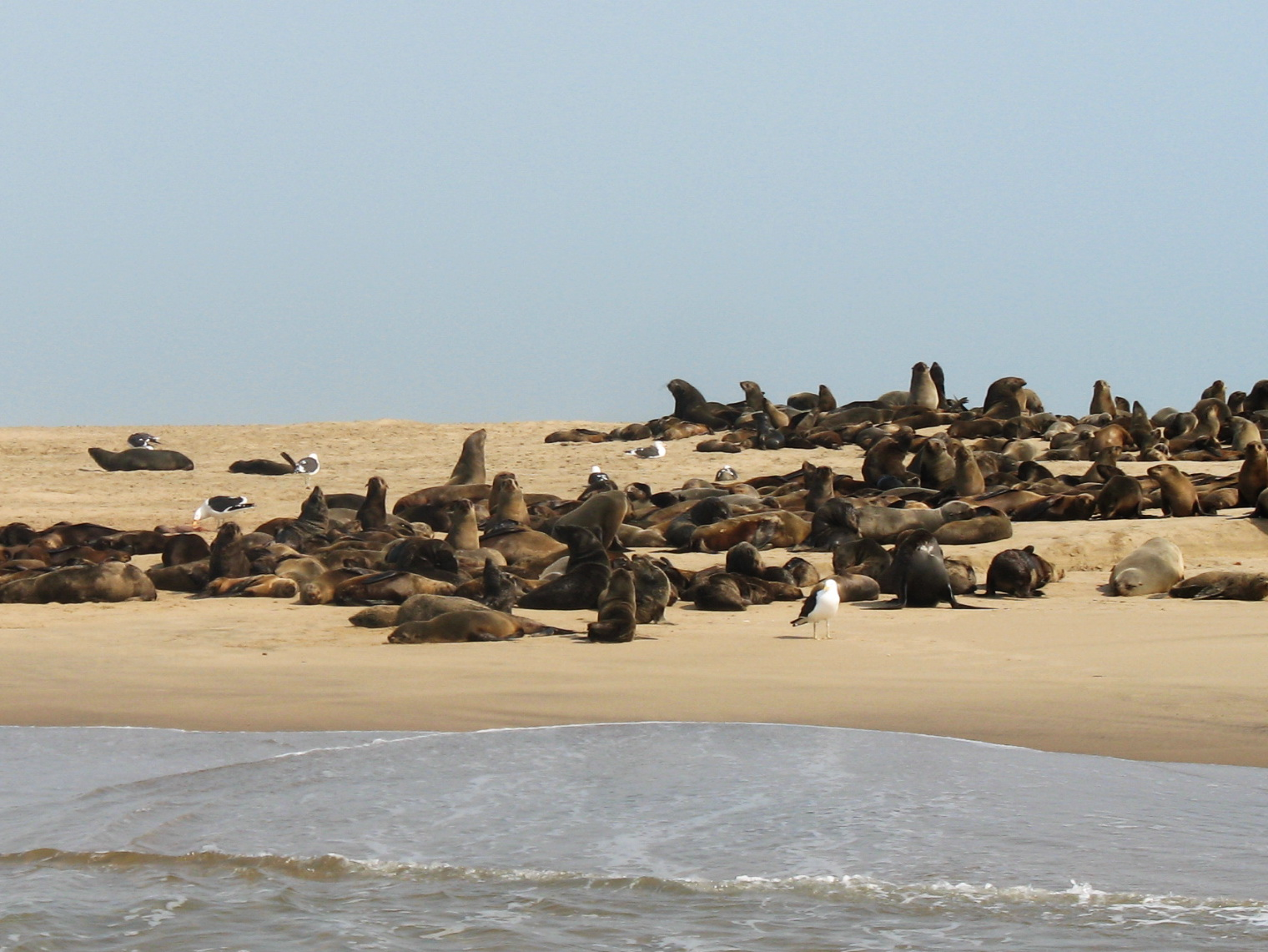
Cape fur seals hauling site

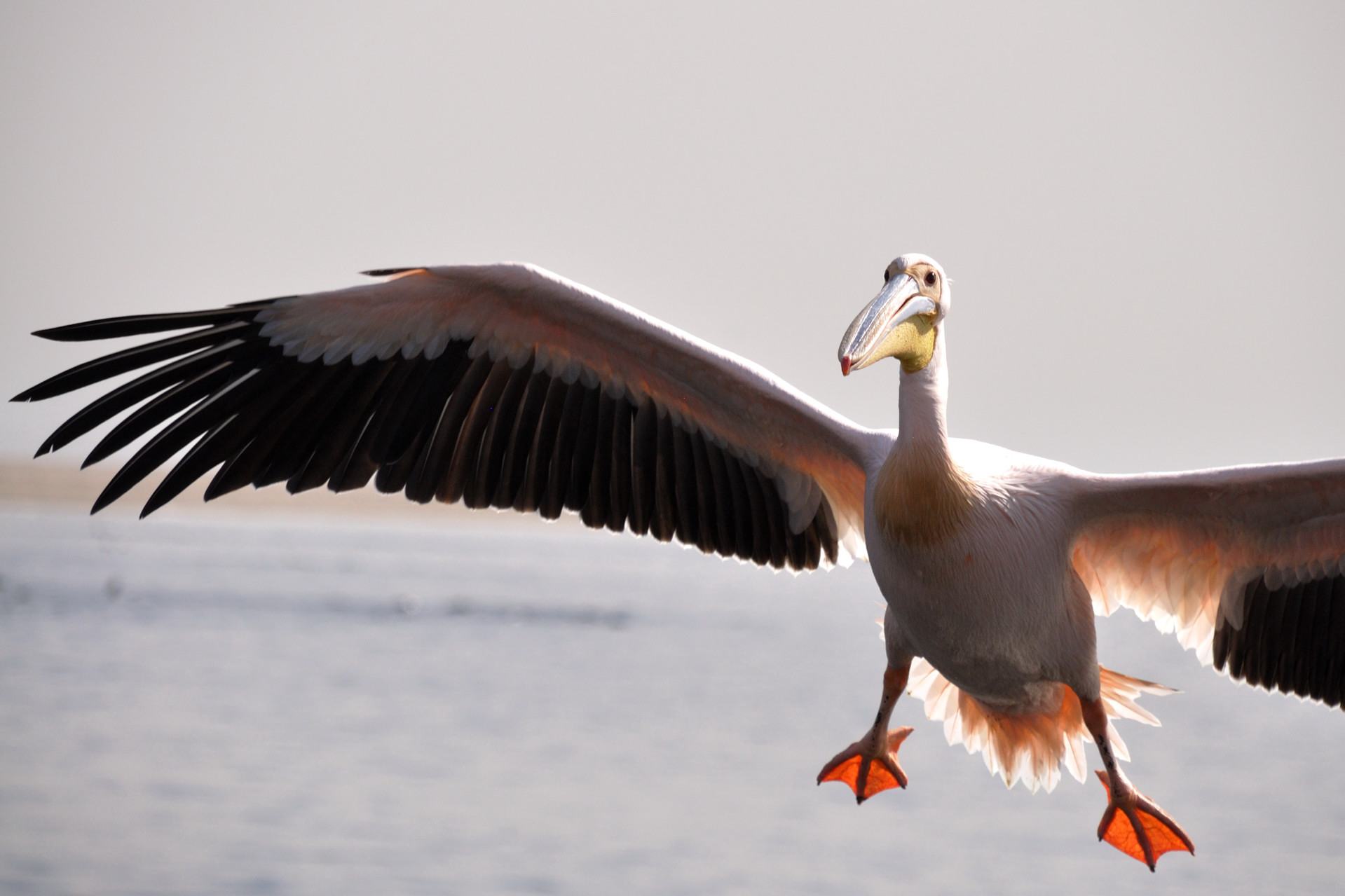
Great white pelican

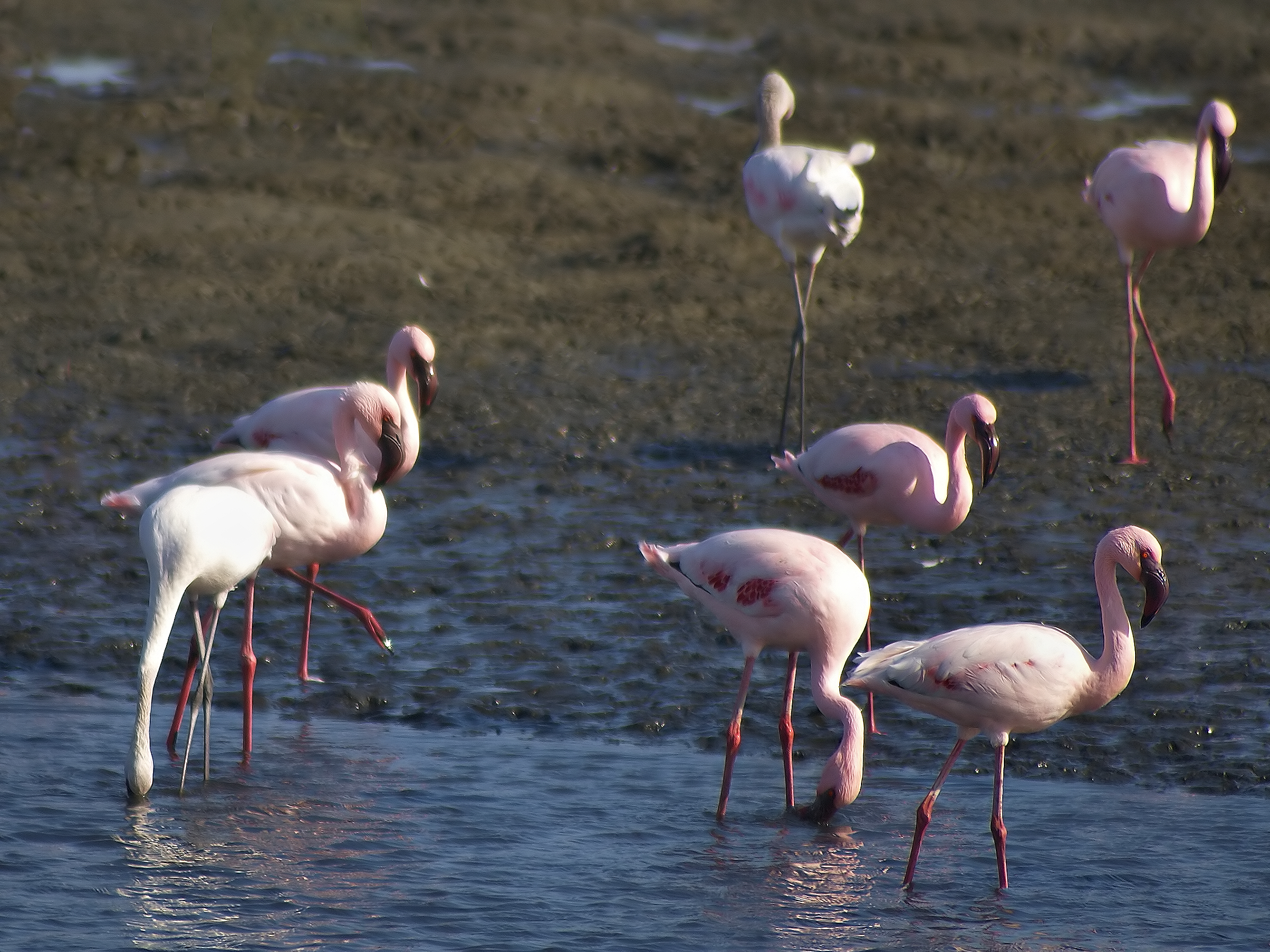
Lesser flamingos

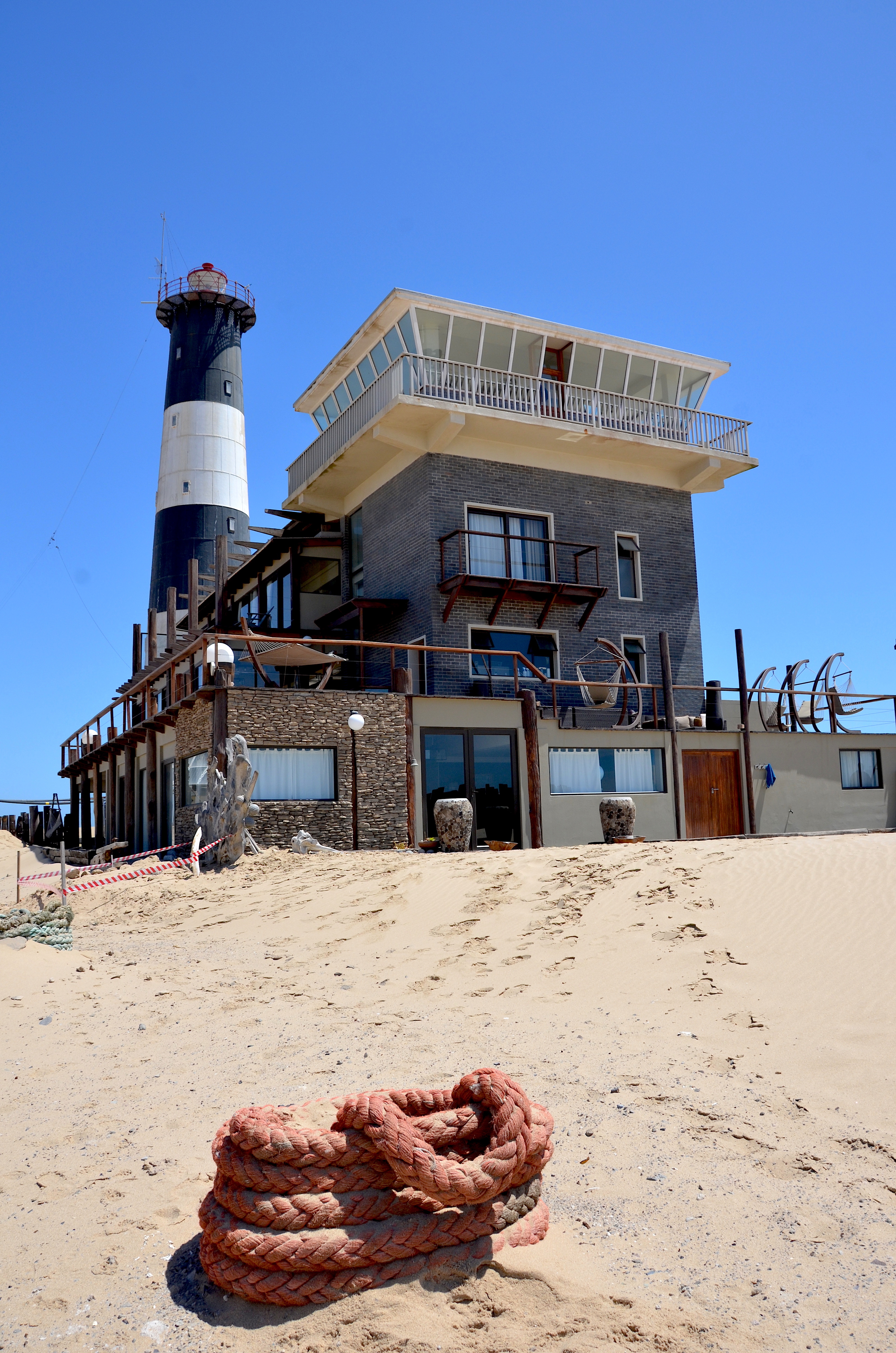
Pelican Point Lodge and Lighthouse

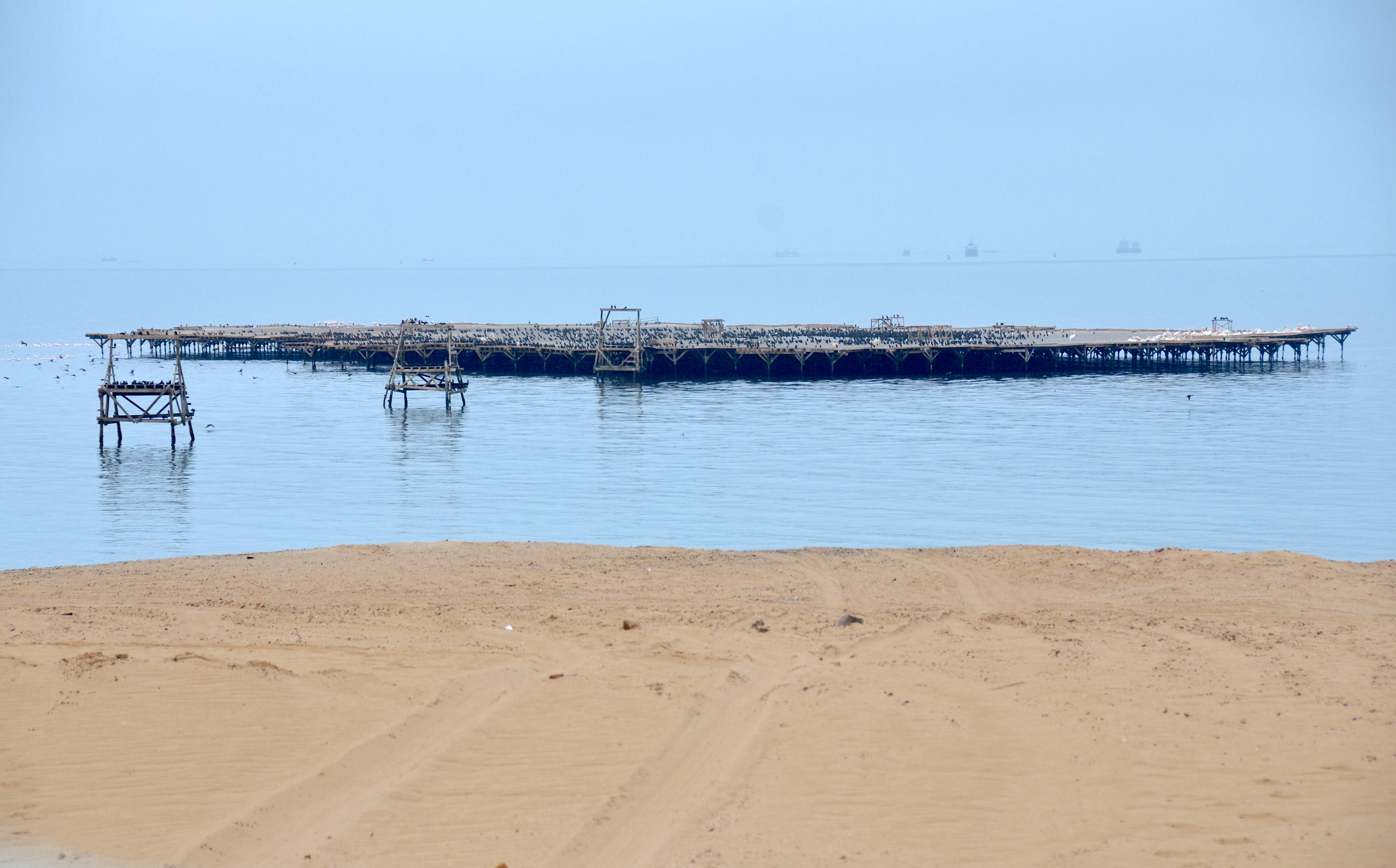
Bird Island near Walvis Bay

Panoramic view of the salt flats of Walvis Bay

Panoramic view of the salt flats of Walvis Bay

Panoramic view of the salt flats of Walvis Bay

Panoramic view of the salt flats of Walvis Bay

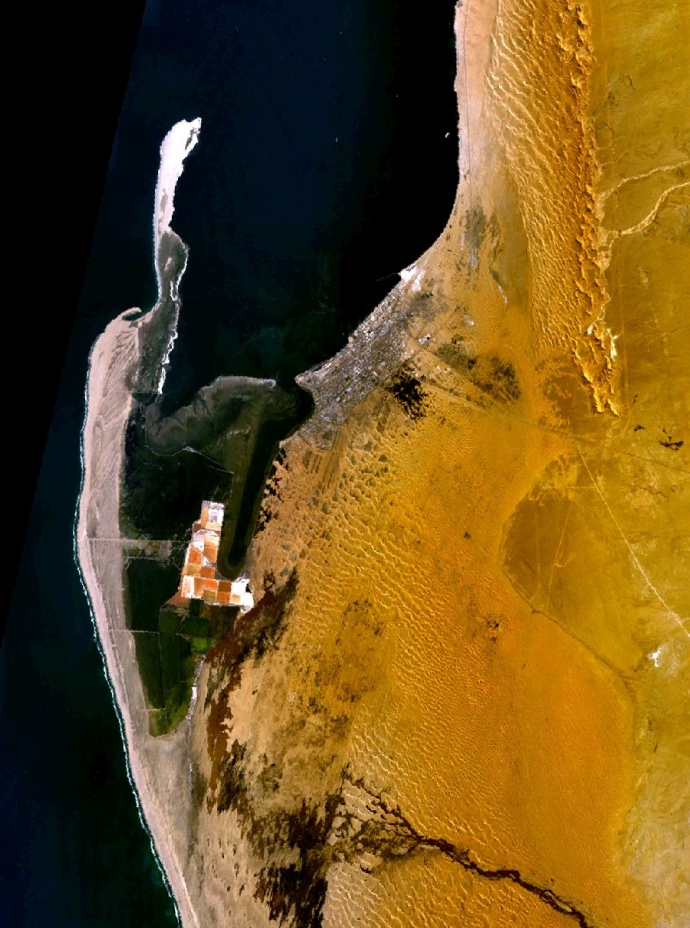
Satellite view of Walvis Bay
