= Listed Miss Grand International 2017's national representative selection =

Miss Grand International 2017's national preliminary pageants

The fifth edition of the Miss Grand International pageant was held at the Vinpearl Phu Quoc Resort and Villas Convention Hall, Phú Quốc, Vietnam on October 25, 2017, in which candidates from 77 countries and territories participated. These candidates were elected as the country representatives through different methods, such as through the Miss Grand National which was held to select the country representative for Miss Grand International specifically, or appointed by another national pageant organizer, in which the main winner was sent to compete on other international stages. Some of them were assigned as the representatives without competing at any national pageant in this particular year.

== Overview ==
MGI 2022 Participants classified by selection methods:
1. A1: Miss Grand National pageant winners/runners-up: 14 (18.2%)
2. A2: Other 2023 national pageant main winners: 4 (5.19%)
3. B1: Won Miss Grand as supplemental title: 7 (9.09%)
4. B2: Appointed from other 2022 pageants: 13 (16.9%)
5. C1: Casting/audition: 0 (0.00%)
6. C2: Appointed, no event held: 39 (50.6%)

As per data collected in the National preliminary contest section below, 46 national pageant was held to elect the country representatives for Miss Grand International 2022. Seventeen of which was the Miss Grand National pageants (A1), seven was other national contests that sent their main winners to Miss Grand International 2023 (A2), eight national contests listed the Miss Grand title as one of the supplement awards (B1), while the other sixteen pageants later appointed its runner-up as Miss Grand National titleholder (B2). All the remaining candidates were appointed without participating in any national pageants (C2), such as the representative of Hong Kong.

Several candidates did not enter the international competition with different reasons and no replacements were assigned, including the representatives of Albania, Iran, Ireland, Kosovo, Namibia, Singapore, and Trinidad and Tobago.

Eight candidates were assigned as the replacements for the original ones, including:

- Canada: Miss Grand Canada 2017 winner, Maddison Fysh, resigned for unknown reasons, and the director assigned Natalie Allin as the new country's representative.
- Cuba: The first appointed representative, Rachel Vazquez, was replaced by Yvette Blaess, who then later resigned the title and Lisandra Delgado was appointed as the new delegate. The seasons for such an incident was unknown.
- Denmark: Former Miss Globe Denmark, Iben Haahr Berner, was elected as the replacement for Natasha Bendix Helms, who resigned due to health problems.
- Ecuador: Miss Ecuador 2017 finalist, Analía Vernaza, was elected as the replacement for the original titleholder, María José Villacís, who resigned for undisclosed reasons.
- Ethiopia: Hanna Abate resigned, and Selamawit Teklay was elected as a new representative.
- Hungary: The original representative, Pásztor Noémi, who obtained the title from the Miss International Hungary 2017 pageant, was replaced by former Miss International 2014, Dálma Karman, for unspecified reasons.
- Myanmar: Due to political issues, Shwe Eain Si, was dethroned and later replaced by the first runner-up Miss Universe Myanmar 2013, Aye Chan Moe.
- Venezuela: After Bruno Caldieron lost the license to Miguel Segovia, Maritza Contreras, who was expected to compete at Miss Grand International 2017, was replaced by an appointed Tulia Alemán.

In this 2022 edition, 6 countries made their debut; 18 countries that competed in the 2016 edition withdrew due to a lack of a national licensee, and 17 countries returned to the competition after being absent in the previous editions. Initially, 84 countries and territories franchises confirmed that they would send their candidates to Indonesia; however, representatives from the seven countries mentioned above withdrew for undisclosed reasons, making the finalized total of 77 contestants.

The information is summarized below.

Returns
Withdrawals
Debuts
- Last competed in 2013:
  - Guadeloupe
  - Serbia
- Last competed in 2014:
  - Argentina
  - Chile
  - Finland
  - Germany
  - Lebanon
  - Tanzania
- Last competed in 2015:
  - Belarus
  - Bulgaria
  - Cambodia
  - Haiti
  - Mongolia
  - Nepal
  - Sweden
  - Uganda
  - United States Virgin Islands
- No licensee:
  - Aruba
  - Iraq
  - Italy
  - Latvia
  - Luxembourg
  - Malta
  - Mauritius
  - Moldova
  - Norway
  - Poland
  - Rwanda
  - Romania
  - Switzerland
  - Suriname
  - Taiwan
  - Tahiti
  - Turkey
  - Uruguay
- Representative determined
  but did not compete:
  - Albania
  - Iran
  - Ireland
  - Kosovo
  - Namibia
  - Singapore
  - Trinidad and Tobago
- Fiji
- Laos
- Northern Ireland
- Sierra Leone
- Tatarstan

== National preliminary pageants ==
The following is a list of Miss Grand International 2017's national preliminary contests, which were categorized by the country representative selection methods.

Map shows Miss Grand International 2017 participating countries and territories, classified by representative selection methods
Color keys
A1: Main winner of the Miss Grand National pageant, e.g., Miss Grand Spain of Spain.
A2: Main winner of the national contest with other pageant names apart from Miss Grand, e.g., The Nigerian Queen of Nigeria.
B1: Obtained Miss Grand National as the supplementary title at other national pageants, e.g., the representative from Binibining Pilipinas of the Philippines.
B2: Appointed Miss Grand National after (1) obtaining the supplementary position at other 2022 national pageants or (2) finishing other placements apart from the main winner at the previous Miss Grand National edition. Such as the representative of Ecuador.
C1: Determined through the casting/audition event.
C2: Appointed with no pageant held
D0: No representative

List of the national preliminary pageants for Miss Grand International 2017, by the coronation date
| Country/Territory | Pageant | Type | Date and Venue | Entrants | Ref. |
| Total: 46 pageants | | – | | | – |
|---|---|---|---|---|---|
| Namibia^{[β]} | Miss Grand Namibia | A1 | July 9, 2016, at the National Theatre of Namibia, Windhoek | 17 | |
| Portugal | Miss República Portuguesa | B2 | July 30, 2016, at the Hotel do Luso, Luso | 15 | |
| Hungary^{[α]} | Miss International Hungary | B1 | August 6, 2016, at the Hunguest Hotel Griff, Budapest | 10 | |
| Sri Lanka | Miss Grand Sri Lanka | A1 | September 25, 2016, at the Taj Samudra Hotel, Colombo | 10 | |
| Czech Republic | Miss Face | A2 | October 1, 2016, at the Clarion Congress Hotel, Prague | 10 | |
| Myanmar^{[α]} | Miss Universe Myanmar | B2 | October 6, 2016, at the Novotel Hotels and Resorts, Yangon | 26 | |
| Serbia | Miss Serbia | B2 | October 9, 2016, at the Pink's studio, Šimanovci | 21 | |
| Mexico | Miss Mexico | B2 | October 14, 2016, at the Teatro Morelos, Morelia, Michoacán | 31 | |
| China | The Miss China | A2 | December 3, 2016, at the Royal Calypt Hotel, Guangzhou | 23 | |
| Venezuela^{[α]} | Señorita Deporte Venezuela | A2 | December 15, 2016, at the Santa Fe Theater, Caracas | 20 | |
| Albania^{[β]} | Miss Grand Albania and Kosovo | A1 | February 28, 2017, at the California Resort, Lipljan, Pristina | 10 | |
| Kosovo^{[β]} | Miss Grand Albania and Kosovo | A1 | February 28, 2017, at the California Resort, Lipljan, Pristina | 10 | |
| Nicaragua | Miss Nicaragua | B2 | March 25, 2017, at the Teatro Nacional Rubén Darío, Managua | 12 | |
| Netherlands | Miss Grand Netherlands | A1 | March 26, 2017, at the Crown Theatre, Aalsmeer | 7 | |
| Indonesia | Puteri Indonesia | B2 | March 31, 2017, at the Jakarta Convention Center, Jakarta | 38 | |
| Denmark^{[α]} | Miss Queen of Scandinavia (Miss World Sweden) | B1 | April 16, 2017, at the Grand Hotel Spegelsalen, Norrmalm, Stockholm | N/A | |
| Sweden | Miss Queen of Scandinavia (Miss World Sweden) | B2 | April 16, 2017, at the Grand Hotel Spegelsalen, Norrmalm, Stockholm | N/A | |
| Ecuador^{[α]} | Miss Ecuador | B2 | April 22, 2017, at the El Chorrillo Complex, Babahoyo, Los Ríos | 22 | |
| Philippines | Binibining Pilipinas | B1 | April 30, 2017, at the Smart Araneta Coliseum, Quezon City, Metro Manila | 40 | |
| Ukraine | Queen of Ukraine | A2 | May 26, 2017, at the Freedom Event Hall, Kyiv | 22 | |
| New Zealand | Miss World New Zealand | B2 | June 3, 2017, at the Sky City Convention Centre, Auckland | 11 | |
| England | Miss International UK (UK Power Pageant) | B1 | June 11, 2017, at the Park Hall Hotel, Lancashire | 45 | |
| Scotland | Miss International UK (UK Power Pageant) | B1 | June 11, 2017, at the Park Hall Hotel, Lancashire | 45 | |
| Wales | Miss International UK (UK Power Pageant) | B1 | June 11, 2017, at the Park Hall Hotel, Lancashire | 45 | |
| India | Femina Miss India | B2 | June 25, 2017, at the Yash Raj Films Studio, Mumbai | 30 | |
| Australia | Miss Grand Australia | A1 | June 30, 2017, at the Doltone House - Hyde Park, Sydney | 16 | |
| Bulgaria | Miss Sofia | B1 | June 30, 2017, at the Rainbow Plaza, Sofia | 16 | |
| Bolivia | Miss Bolivia | B2 | July 1, 2017, at the Salón Sirionó dela FexPo, Santa Cruz de la Sierra | 24 | |
| Panama | Reinas y Misters de Panamá | B1 | July 1, 2017, at the Convention Center Vasco Nuñez de Balboa, Panama City | 21 | |
| Spain | Miss Grand Spain | A1 | July 8, 2017, at the Teatro de la Villa del Conocimiento y las Artes, Seville | 28 | |
| South Korea | Miss Grand Korea | A1 | July 12, 2017, at the Island Castle Hotel Resort, Seoul | 27 | |
| Thailand | Miss Grand Thailand | A1 | July 14, 2017, at the Bangkok International Trade and Exhibition Centre, Bangkok | 77 | |
| Laos | Miss Grand Laos | A1 | July 15, 2017, at the ITECC Shopping Mall, Xaysetha, Vientiane | 17 | |
| Canada^{[α]} | Miss Grand Canada | A1 | July 16, 2017, at the Holiday Inn Express & Suites Calgary, Calgary | N/A | |
| Trinidad and Tobago^{[β]} | Miss Trinidad and Tobago | B2 | July 16, 2017, at the Central Bank of Trinidad and Tobago, Port of Spain | 8 | |
| Guatemala | Miss Guatemala | B2 | July 23, 2017, at the Parque de la Industria, Guatemala City | 16 | |
| United States | Miss Grand United States | A1 | July 25, 2017, at the Leonard Nimoy Thalia, Symphony Space, New York City | 17 | |
| US Virgin Islands | Miss Grand United States | B2 | July 25, 2017, at the Leonard Nimoy Thalia, Symphony Space, New York City | 17 | |
| Cambodia | Miss Grand Cambodia | A1 | July 27, 2017, at the Nagaworld Hotel Grand Ballroom, Phnom Penh | 18 | |
| Paraguay | Miss Grand Paraguay | A1 | July 29, 2017, at the Agustin Pio Barrios Theater, Japanese Paraguayan Center, Asunción | 16 | |
| Malaysia | Miss Grand Malaysia | A1 | August 5, 2017, at the Grand Pacific Ballroom, Evolve Concept Mall, Selangor | 16 | |
| South Africa | Miss Supranational South Africa | B1 | August 5, 2017, at the Atterbury Theatre, Pretoria | N/A | |
| Tanzania | Miss Grand Tanzania | A1 | August 11, 2017, at the Dar es Salaam Convention Center, Dar es Salaam | 28 | |
| Slovakia | Felvidék Szépe | A2 | August 12, 2017, at the Nemeshodosi Lakoma, Dunajská Streda | 12 | |
| Guadeloupe | Miss International Guadeloupe | B1 | August 20, 2017, at the Ciné Théâtre de Lamentin, Lamentin | 14 | |
| Singapore^{[β]} | Miss Singapore | A2 | August 25, 2017, at the Concorde Hotel, Orchard Road | 18 | |
| Jamaica | Miss Universe Jamaica | B2 | August 26, 2017, at the Jamaica Pegasus Hotel, Kingston | 19 | |
| Japan | Miss Grand Japan | A1 | September 12, 2017, at the Selene Studio, Minato, Tokyo | 14 | |
| Chile | Miss Grand Chile | A1 | September 22, 2017, at the Centro de Eventos Music Palace, Talca | 9 | |
| Egypt | Miss Egypt | B2 | September 24, 2017, at the Misr Opera House Theatre, 6th of October | 22 | |
| Iran^{[β]} | Miss Iran | A2 | Private online pageant | N/A | |
Note: ^α Later replaced by the appointed representatives: Canada, Venezuela, Hungary, Myanmar, Ecuador; or other finalists: Denmark; ^β Withdrew before entering the international contest, no replacement assigned.
