= Miss Grand Namibia 2016 =

2nd Miss Grand Namibia competition, beauty pageant edition

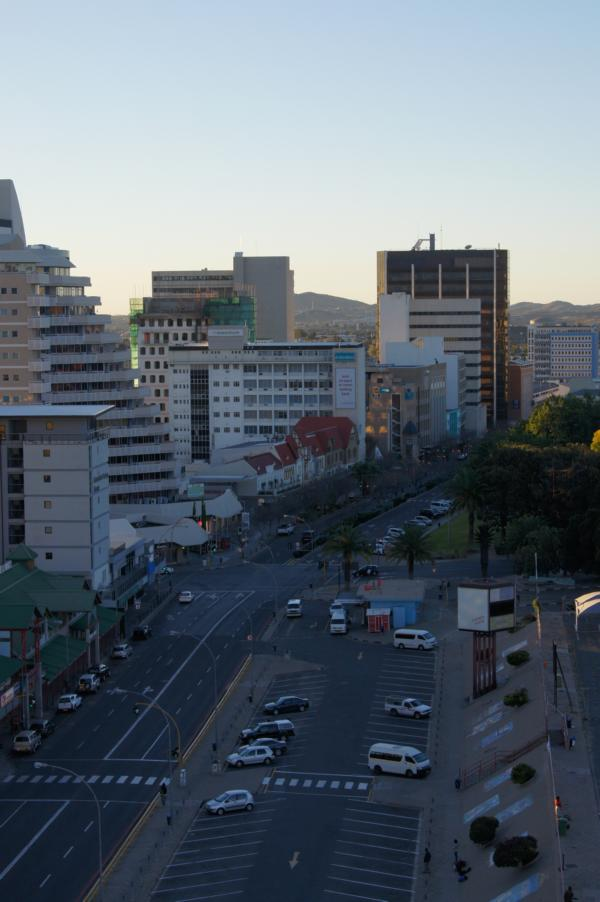
- Windhoek, the host city of the contest
- Date: 9 July 2016
- Venue: National Theatre of Namibia, Windhoek
- Entrants: 17
- Placements: 10
- Winner: Esperance Luvindao (Khomas)

Miss Grand Namibia 2016 was the second edition of the Miss Grand Namibia beauty pageant, held on July 9, 2016, at the National Theatre of Namibia in the country's capital, Windhoek, where a fourth-year medical student from the School of Medicine of the University of Namibia, Esperance Luvindao, was announced the winner, outclassing other sixteen regional representatives. Luvindao was expected to represent Namibia at the Miss Grand International 2016 pageant in Las Vegas, Nevada, but withdrew for unknown reasons. Meanwhile, one of the contest's runners-up was also sent to compete at the Miss International 2017 pageant in Japan.

The event was held with a total of 39 candidates, who each competed in one category of the titles, including Little Miss Grand Namibia (ages 8 to 10), Miss Pre-Teen Grand Namibia (ages 11 to 14), Miss Teen Grand Namibia (ages 15 to 17), and the Miss category (ages 18–27). Other than the Miss category, the winners of other categories also gained the right to represent Namibia internationally.

The following list is the national finalists of the Miss Grand Namibia 2016 pageant; some of them qualified for the national pageant by winning a regional preliminary contest.

- Erongo – Ruusa Angula
- Hardap – Hileni Mwahomenange
- Kavango East – Yanique Kastoor
- Kavango West – Sammy Jo Sowden
- Khomas – Esperance Luvindao
- Kunene – Kerth Harvest Ithana
- Ohangwena – Lucia Jakob
- Omaheke – Ripuree Hoebes
- Omusati – Helvi Pewa Shiweda
- Oshana – Eva Ndatipo
- Oshikoto – Sicillia Samuel
- Otjozondjupa – Mercy Kharigus
- Swakopmund – Purity Mbeha
- Walvis Bay – Tara Minah Haufiku
- Windhoek – Latifah Makaula
- Zambezi – Ruusa Marius
- ǁKaras – Victoria Penna
