= COVID-19 pandemic in Namibia =

- Disease: COVID-19
- Pathogen: SARS-CoV-2
- Location: Namibia
- First outbreak: Wuhan, Hubei, China (suspected); 30°35′14″N 114°17′17″E
- Index case: Windhoek, Khomas Region
- Arrival date: 11 March 2020 (6 years, 8 months and 3 days)
- Confirmed cases: 172,557 (updated 5 November 2026)
- Deaths: 4,110 (updated 5 November 2026)

Government website
- Namibian Statistics Agency

The COVID-19 pandemic in Namibia is part of the worldwide pandemic of coronavirus disease 2019 (COVID-19) caused by severe acute respiratory syndrome coronavirus 2 (SARS-CoV-2). Kalumbi Shangula, Minister of Health and Social Services, announced on 14 March 2020 that the virus had reached Namibia. A Romanian couple constituted the two first cases and recovered 79 days after their initial diagnosis.

On 17 March 2020, president Hage Geingob declared a state of emergency which introduced measures such as the closure of all borders, suspension of gatherings and economic related resolutions. Between March and September 2020 Namibia went through lockdowns of varying severity. Beginning 28 March, a full lockdown "stage 1" was prescribed, allowing only essential services. On 5 May the country transitioned into "stage 2", allowing commuting to the work place, restricted use of shops and malls, some inter-regional travel, and transportation of goods across borders. On 2 June "stage 3" was prescribed, with schools and restaurants reopening and the sale of alcohol no longer forbidden. Walvis Bay, where two newly infected people had been in contact with many locals, instead moved back to stage 1. On 30 June "stage 4" was reached, allowing again public gatherings of less than 250 people. However, during this period infections rose dramatically, and stage 3 was again invoked for 28 days on 13 August 2020.

No infections were reported from 6 April 2020 to 20 May 2020, however there was a notable increase in cases after this period - possibly due to local transmission. A second and higher rise of infections began in July 2020, following relaxed restrictions in several regions. The first death was reported 116 days after the arrival of COVID-19 in Namibia.

As of September 2020, Namibia was within the top 18 number of countries with the most COVID-19 cases reported in Africa. Although Erongo led with the most cases and deaths, Khomas Region started to experience a community outbreak, and numbers rose exponentially to match that of Erongo. In mid-September, most restrictions were lifted after a significant decrease in daily cases.

== Background ==
On 12 January 2020, the World Health Organization (WHO) confirmed that a novel coronavirus was the cause of a respiratory illness in a cluster of people in Wuhan, Hubei, China, which was reported to the WHO on 31 December 2019.

The case fatality ratio for COVID-19 has been much lower than SARS of 2003, but the transmission has been significantly greater, with a significant total death toll.

== Timeline ==
Cases

Deaths

=== Confirmed cases ===
==== March 2020 ====
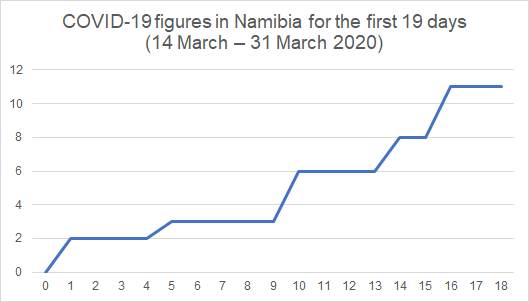
COVID-19 cases in Namibia, March 2020. 14 March, the day the virus had reached Namibia, is shown as day 1.

On 14 March, Namibia reported its first cases of COVID-19, caused by SARS-CoV-2. They were a Romanian couple who arrived in Windhoek from Spain via Doha, Qatar, on 11 March. They had been screened on arrival at Hosea Kutako International Airport but showed no symptoms at that time. The couple presented to a private health facility with flu-like symptoms in Klein Windhoek and was referred for testing. At that time, Namibia did not have the capacity to test for COVID-19, so tests had to be sent to South Africa. Their results came back on 14 March and were announced for the first time by the Minister of Health and Social Services.

On 19 March, a third case was confirmed. A 61-year-old German citizen, who arrived in Namibia on 13 March, was tested positive. On 23 March, the fourth case was confirmed. It was a 19-year-old male citizen from London. The patient was quarantined and put in isolation. By 24 March 2020, the total number of cases reached six when two more cases were confirmed. A Namibian pilot, aged 44, and a student studying at University of the Witwatersrand in South Africa tested positive during quarantine. Although the 21-year-old student tested negative upon his departure from South Africa, he was tested again in Namibia and put under mandatory quarantine as per the Emergency Response plan. On 29 March 3 new travel-related cases were confirmed. 2 persons, a 35-year-old female returning from Dubai, and a 69-year-old male who travelled from South Africa. All were admitted to isolation facilities.

By end March, the total number of cases had reached 11, all of which travel-related. On 28 March, a complete lockdown was ordered.

==== April and May 2020 ====
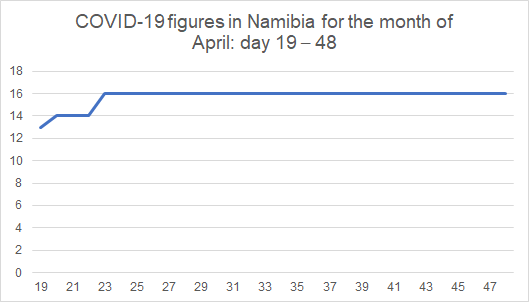
COVID-19 cases in Namibia, April 2020. Day 19 represents 1 April; 19 days after the initial infection. Day 48 represents 30 April.

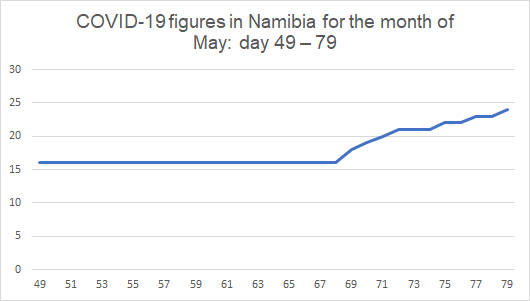
COVID-19 cases in Namibia, May 2020. Day 49 represents 1 May; 49 days after the initial infection. Day 79 represents 31 May.

With the country in lockdown for the complete month, only 3 new cases were registered in early April. Until 20 May 2020, no new cases were recorded. The total remained at 16 confirmed cases.

End of May 2020 some new cases were recorded, so that on 31 May a total of 24 cases was reached. The Romanian couple, who were the first two cases in Namibia, recovered 79 days after their initial diagnosis.

==== June 2020 ====
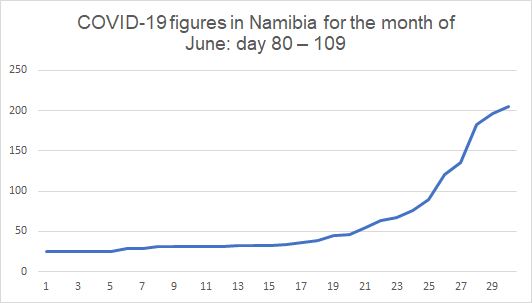
COVID-19 cases in Namibia, June 2020. Day 80 represents 1 June; 80 days after the initial infection.

Throughout most of June 2020, Namibia was in "stage 3" lockdown, allowing national travel and restricted operations of schools, restaurants, and businesses. During the first half of June, cases rose from 24 to 32. Two of the new cases were suspected to be Namibia's first local infections. In the second half of June cases picked up significantly and stood at over 200 on the last day of the month.

==== July 2020 ====
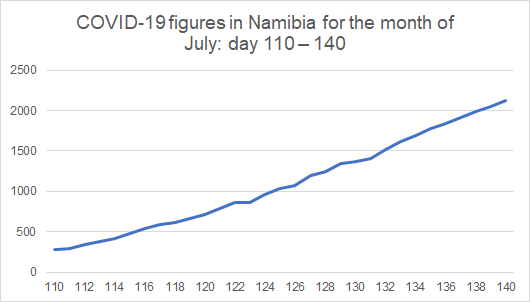
COVID-19 cases in Namibia, July 2020. Day 110 represents 1 July; 110 days after the initial infection. Cases jumped from about 250 cases to 2,200 cases in the month of July.

The first of July marked 80 new cases. 78 were from Walvis Bay and 2 were detected in quarantine facilities. Out of the 80 cases, 54 were males (68%) and the remaining 26 were females (33%). The youngest case was a one-year-old and the oldest was a 61-year-old. All were in stable conditions at that time. The Health Ministry also announced that there is substantial backlog of tests due to increased number of tests carried out.

2 July: 8 new cases were recorded; all from Walvis Bay. Included were 4 males and 4 females. Only four of the 8 were contacts of confirmed cases. All were reported to be in stable conditions.

On 3 July 56 new cases were announced. 54 were from Walvis Bay and 2 were in Windhoek, the capital. Out of the 56 new cases, 39 were females (68%) and the other 32% were males. 29 cases were in contact with a confirmed case. The youngest was a 2-month-old child. The Health Ministry also applauded the testing body NIP for testing 592 tests in a 24-hour period - the highest yet. This comes after it was announced that there is a backlog of almost a week in tests.

26 new cases were registered on the 4th of July. One was a new-born from Windhoek and the other 25 cases were all from Walvis Bay. 18 were females and 7 were males. Out of the 26 new cases, 11 were contacts to confirmed cases. All cases were reported to be in stable conditions.

38 new cases were announced on 5 July bringing the total COVID-19 cases to 412 [sic]. 27 were from Walvis Bay and 1 was from Ohangwena region. 22 out of 38 were females and 16 were males. All were in stable/mild conditions.

On 6 July 73 new cases were announced by the Health Ministry. One case was from Windhoek and the other 72 cases were from Walvis Bay. 37 were females and 36 were males - the youngest being 5 years old. All were reported to be in stable conditions.

7 July: 54 new cases were registered. All were from Walvis Bay. 35 of these cases were females. All were reported to be in stable conditions.

8 July brought about 55 new cases. 53 were from Walvis Bay; most of which were on a vessel and 2 were from Windhoek. 48 were males and 7 were females. All were reported to be in stable conditions. A Namibian truck driver, who tested positive in Botswana, is currently in the isolation units of Gobabis. He does not however count as a Namibian case. On 3 July, a case of a new-born baby was announced. This case was de-registered on 8 July as it was a false-positive. The positive result was probably due to contamination.

On 9 July 22 new cases were reported. 21 out of the 22 cases were Namibians. The cases were from Erongo region (20), Oshana region (1) and !Karas region (1). All were reported to be in stable conditions.

52 new cases (49 from Walvis Bay, 1 from Oshakati and 2 from Okahandja) were announced on 10 July 2020. On the same day, Namibia's first COVID-19 death was also announced (see Deaths timeline). All were reported to be in stable conditions. Later on, another case was announced - that of the deceased patient who was not included in the initial cases.

11 July: 45 new cases were announced by the Health Minister. 42 were from Walvis Bay, 2 from Swakopmund and 1 from Lüderitz. All were reported to be in stable conditions.

72 new cases were reported on 12 July. According to the Health Minister, 68 of the new cases were from Walvis Bay, while Swakopmund, Engela (in the northern region Ohangwena), Keetmanshoop and Oshakati each reported 1 case. All cases were reported to be in stable conditions.

There were 76 new cases on 13 July. 73 were from Walvis Bay, 2 from Windhoek and 1 from Keetmanshoop.

Only 3 cases were announced on 14 July. One of the cases was also a reported death (see Deaths timeline). All 3 were from Walvis Bay in the Erongo region.

96 new cases have been added on 15 July. 1 of those tested was a South African and the rest were Namibians - 2 from Keetmanshoop, 2 from Karasburg, 1 from Windhoek and 90 from Walvis Bay.

The 1,000 mark was reached on 16 July when 72 new cases were announced - 1 from Windhoek, 1 from Katima Mulilo (but travelled from Walvis Bay), 2 from Swakopmund and the other 68 from Walvis Bay. The case from Windhoek was a patient who was admitted to a hospital.

46 new cases were added on 17 July. Only 1 of these was a non-Namibian. 50% were males and the other half were females. 3 cases were from Windhoek, 2 were from Swakopmund, 1 from Keetmanshoop and the other 40 from Walvis Bay.

125 new cases were announced on 18 July. 118 were from Walvis Bay and the other 7 were from: Windhoek (1), Swakopmund (2), Keetmanshoop (2 who are non-Namibians), Luderitz and Engela (both 1). The majority of new cases (70%) were males.

44 new cases were announced on 19 July (along with 1 new death; see Deaths timeline). 6 of the 44 new cases were non-Namibians on a fishing vessel. The rest were from Erongo region: 2 from Swakopmund and 36 from Walvis Bay.

20 July: 97 new cases along with 1 new death (see Deaths timeline) were announced. It was also announced that 13 cases are in severe conditions across the country. 90 were from Walvis Bay, 3 from Swakopmund, 2 from Engela and 1 from Outapi & Katima Mulilo each. 3 health care workers were among the infected cases. 81 out of 97 cases were males.

22 new cases were announced on 21 July. 21 were from the Erongo region, while 1 was from Windhoek. 17 were males.

On 22 July the total COVID-19 cases rose to 1,402 when 36 new cases were announced. 32 were from Erongo region, 3 in Windhoek and 1 in Luderitz.

23 July: 120 new cases. 111 from Erongo region, 7 from Khomas region and 1 from Kharas and Zambezi each.

96 new cases were announced on 24 July. 79 originated from Erongo region, while 10 originated from the capital, Windhoek.

On 25 July 69 new cases were announced.

88 new cases, along with 1 new death (see below) were announced on 26 July. Most originated from Walvis Bay, however a few originated from Windhoek, raising some concerns of local transmission. The Minister of Health and Social Services, Kalumbi Shangula however dismissed these claims and called them 'sporadic transmission'.

A total of 68 cases were announced on 28 July. 60 originated from Walvis Bay.

28 July: 74 new cases.

29 July: 69 new cases were announced. 59 originated from Erongo region, 8 from Khomas, and 1 from Hardap and Ohangwena each.

66 new cases were announced on 30 July.

At the end of July, total COVID-19 cases rose to 2,129.

==== August 2020 ====
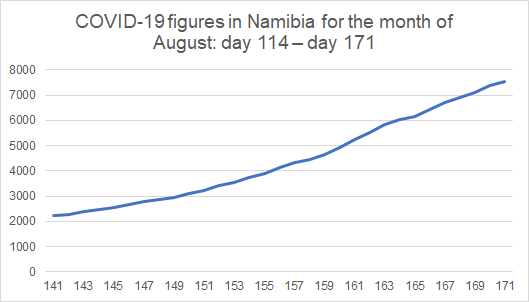
COVID-19 cases in Namibia, August 2020. Day 141 represents 1 August; 141 days after the initial infection. Day 171 represents 31 August. Cases jumped from 2,500 to about 7,500 in this month alone.

The first day of August brought about 95 new cases. Most originated from Erongo region, however 6 originated from Okahandja in the Otjozondjupa region; a region previously with few cases. On 4 August, total COVID-19 cases rose to 2,470. Most of these were from Walvis Bay, however a growing number originated from Windhoek as well.

6 August: Cases rose to 2,652. Cases were mainly from the Erongo region, however cases were also detected in other parts of the country, especially in the northern parts and in the capital, Windhoek.

One week later, the total number of confirmed COVID-19 cases increased with almost 1,000 new cases, with the 3,000 mark reached on 10 August. As of 14 August, there was a total of 3,726 confirmed cases in the Namibian territory. Although most of the cases arose from Walvis Bay and Swakopmund, both cities which are experiencing a current outbreak, the capital also recorded a high spike in cases. During a national COVID-19 media conference, the president described the situation in Windhoek as 'clustered community transmission'.

On 14 August 2020, presidential advisor Inge Zaamwani-Kamwi tested positive for COVID-19. As a precaution, presidential press secretary Alfredo Tjiurimo Hengari said President Hage Geingob undertook a precautionary COVID-19 test which the results came out negative.

Cases continued to rise in the Khomas region, while a downward trend was noticed mid-August in Erongo region.

In the month of August, cases jumped from 2,500 to almost 7,500 – an increase in approximately 5,000 cases.

==== September 2020 ====
September started off with 7,692 cases of COVID-19. Although cases were still increasing exponentially, a slight decrease was observed in the preceding week. On 2 September, Khomas and Erongo regions both had 3,400+ cases.

During the period of 2 September—12 September 2020, Khomas had 897 new cases, while Erongo only had 181 new cases. !Karas region had 100. By this time, it has already been established that the Khomas region; in particular Windhoek, the capital, was the hotspot of the country with the most cases and most deaths.

The 10,000-mark was reached on 17 September 2020.

=== Recoveries ===
==== Before June 2020 ====
Cumulative figures during this period are not considered as re-infections occurred. At the beginning of April 2020, 3 recoveries, two of which were thought to be the first cases, were erroneously announced by the Ministry. "Though the two [Romanians] have recovered from all signs and symptoms they have not been cleared yet by their second test results". This made the 2 recoveries obsolete and only one recovery was confirmed. The Romanian couple, which formed part of the first 2 cases, tested positive and negative on different occasions throughout April and May and only fully recovered 79 days after their infection. Their respective recoveries were registered, but then revoked as they tested positive again.

On 16 April, another recovery was announced.

By 18 April 3 new recoveries were announced.

23 April marked another recovery.

On 26 April, another recovery was announced.

7 May marked another recovery. This marked the start of the period where no confirmed cases were registered for about 44 days.

On 9 May, the recovery of case number 10 was announced.

On 10 May, case number 9 also fully recovered according to the Ministry of Health and Social Services.

On 14 May, case number 13 fully recovered.

Case number 7's recovery was announced on 15 May 2020.

On 20 May, just before a spike in cases, the supposed recovery of case number 1 was announced. Case number 1 tested positive after this again.

On the first of June, the final recovery of the Romanian couple (case number 1 & 2) was announced. This brought the recoveries to 16 - everyone infected before the "spike" in infections (i.e. 20 May) have recovered.

==== During & after June 2020 ====
Cumulative figures after this period are considered as no re-infections occurred. By 10 June, a total of 17 recoveries were registered.

One new recovery - that of case number 28 - was announced on 16 June. The total at this stage was 18 recoveries.

On 17 June 2020, case number 26 has recovered and was sent home. The total recoveries was 19.

22 June 2020: 2 new recoveries were announced. They were case number 23 and 25. This brought the total recoveries to 21.

On 26 June 1 new recovery was announced - that of case number 31. At this stage, total number of recoveries rose to 22.

28 June: 2 new recoveries were registered. Case number 22 and 30 have recovered. Case number 22, the patient whose condition was severe, recovered. The total number of patients recovered rose to 24 recoveries.

On 3 July 1 new recovery was registered. Case number 24 has recovered.

The 26th recovery was announced on 12 July. Case number 17 (!Karas region) has recovered.

2 new recoveries were registered on 13 July. They were case number 21 and 43.

On 14 July, the recovery of case 38 was announced.

Case number 33 and 186's recoveries were announced on 15 July.

The total recoveries rose to 32 when another recovery was announced on 17 July. Case 210 has recovered.

19 July: 3 new recoveries were announced by the Health Ministry. Case number 130, 196 & 331 have all recovered.

7 new recoveries (case numbers 89, 103, 143, 166, 169, 179 & 244) were registered on 20 July.

15 new recoveries were announced on 21 July.

The total recoveries rose to 64 on 22 July after 7 new recoveries were announced.

23 July: 5 new recoveries.

3 new recoveries were announced on the 24th of July.

26 July: Another 3 recoveries tallied the total recoveries to 75.

26 new recoveries were registered on 27 July. On the 28th, another 3 were registered, bringing the total number of recoveries to 104.

60 new recoveries were announced on 30 July.

As of 1 August, total recoveries stood at 171.

On 4 August, the total number of people recovered was 211.

By 6 August, the number of recoveries spiked significantly after the implementation of the new quarantine protocols.

After the changed quarantine and isolation protocols announced by the Health Minister took effect, the number of recoveries spiked drastically. The week of 10 August brought about close to 1,500 new recoveries. As of 14 August, the total number of recovered patients stood at 2,342.

Recoveries continued to increase following the new recovery protocols. As of 1 September 44% of confirmed cases have recovered – which turns out on 3,454 total recoveries.

During the period of 2 September—12 September 2020, the most recoveries were announced in Khomas region; 1,265. Erongo region had 722 new recoveries while the other regions had less than 100 new recoveries.

=== Deaths ===
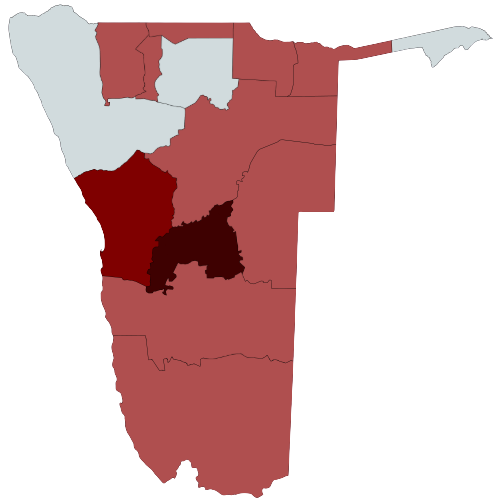
Cumulative COVID-19 deaths in Namibia per region. Updated 29 September 2020. 50+ 30+ 1–5 None

==== July 2020 ====
On 10 July 116 days after the arrival of COVID-19 in Namibia, the first death was reported. A 45-year-old man from Walvis Bay, Erongo region, presented to a health facility on 5 July with complaints of dizziness, cough and difficulty in breathing. His condition deteriorated quickly and he died on 8 July. After a positive confirmatory result of COVID-19, his death was announced on 10 July by Kalumbi Shangula, the Minister of Health and Social Services.

The second death was announced on 14 July. A patient with pre-existing medical conditions (diabetes mellitus) died and a subsequent test confirmed that the deceased had COVID-19. The patient was a 44-year-old male from Walvis Bay.

19 July: One new death has been announced by the Health Ministry. The deceased, a 45-year-old man with a chronic illness, died at his home. He did not turn up for work on Monday, 13 July. He did, however, complain of a headache the previous day. After calls to him were left unanswered, the police was informed. His body was discovered and transported to the local mortuary. A positive COVID-19 test confirmed his probable cause of death.

Another death was announced on 20 July. The patient was managed at a private hospital in Walvis Bay.

3 new deaths were announced on 21 July. All 3 were from Walvis Bay.

An 8th death due to COVID-19 was announced on 26 July. This case, like all the others, originated from Walvis Bay where a current epidemic of local transmission is happening. The deceased, a 47-year-old man, had underlying health conditions and died in a private health setting.

One more death was announced on 29 July. A 44-year-old woman with pre-existing conditions presented to a public hospital on 21 July. Her condition became worse and she died on 28 July 2020.

The first death of Windhoek in the Khomas region was announced on 30 July. The deceased, a 41-year-old male, presented to hospital on 27 July, but died one day later. He had underlying medical conditions.

==== August 2020 ====
The first day of August brought about another death; a 53-year-old male from Swakopmund in the Erongo region. Like all the previous 10 deaths, the patient had pre-existing health conditions.

Another death was announced on 3 July. The patient died in Windhoek Central Hospital. He was 49 years old and had pre-existing medical conditions. The total deaths at this time stood at 12.

3 new deaths - 2 from Swakopmund and 1 from Walvis Bay were announced on 6 July. 2 people were aged in their 70s and the other in her 50s. 2 had underlying medical conditions.

A death in Windhoek, the capital, was announced on 7 August. The deceased was an 84-year-old female with "multiple co-morbidities".

With close to 800 new cases reported in the span of 5 days, the number of deaths also started to increase sharply. Most of the deaths originated from Walvis Bay with ages ranging from 40 and above. Swakopmund and Windhoek also reported a few deaths. In 90% of new deaths announced, a pre-existing health condition such as HIV or diabetes was present. As of 14 August, the total number of deaths stood at 31.

More deaths were reported in Windhoek than before. On 15 August 3 deaths were registered from the capital, where cluster local transmission is currently present.

Deaths continued to rise in Khomas region, while a downward trend was noticed in Erongo region.

==== September 2020 ====
As of 2 September, Khomas was leading with the highest number of deaths. In the preceding weeks, each day brought about at least one new death. The total number of deaths at this stage was 82.

On 3 September, Khomas became the region with the most COVID-19 cases and deaths. This follows after sporadic community transmission was confirmed in Windhoek, the capital.

During the period of 2 September—12 September 2020, Khomas had 7 deaths, while Erongo only had 1 new death. !Karas region had 2 more deaths. By this time, it has already been established that the Khomas region; in particular Windhoek, the capital, was the hotspot of the country with the most cases and most deaths.

The 100-mark was reached on 13 September 2020.

== Notable deaths ==
- 14 August 2020: Sofia Asino; sister of founding president Sam Nujoma
- 18 August 2020: Jeff Mbako; advisor to President Hage Geingob from 2015 to 2018
- 26 August 2020: Dirk Mudge; Namibian politician
- 19 June 2021: Vekuii Rukoro, Ovaherero Chief

== Statistics ==
=== Cumulative confirmed cases ===
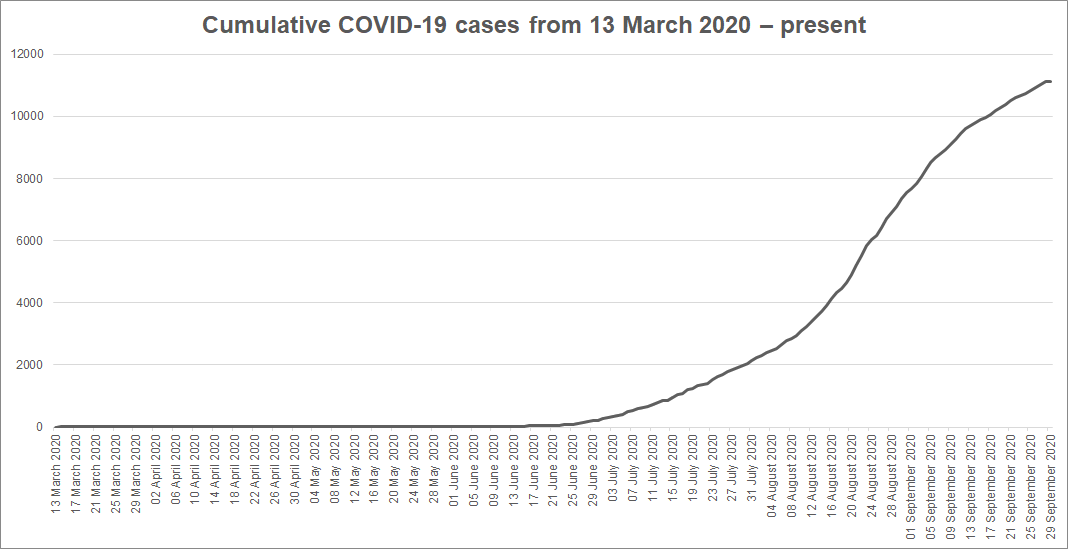
A graph showing the cumulative number of COVID-19 cases in Namibia since initial day of infection. Note: As of 29 September 2020.

=== Confirmed new cases per day ===
View source data.

=== Cumulative confirmed deaths ===
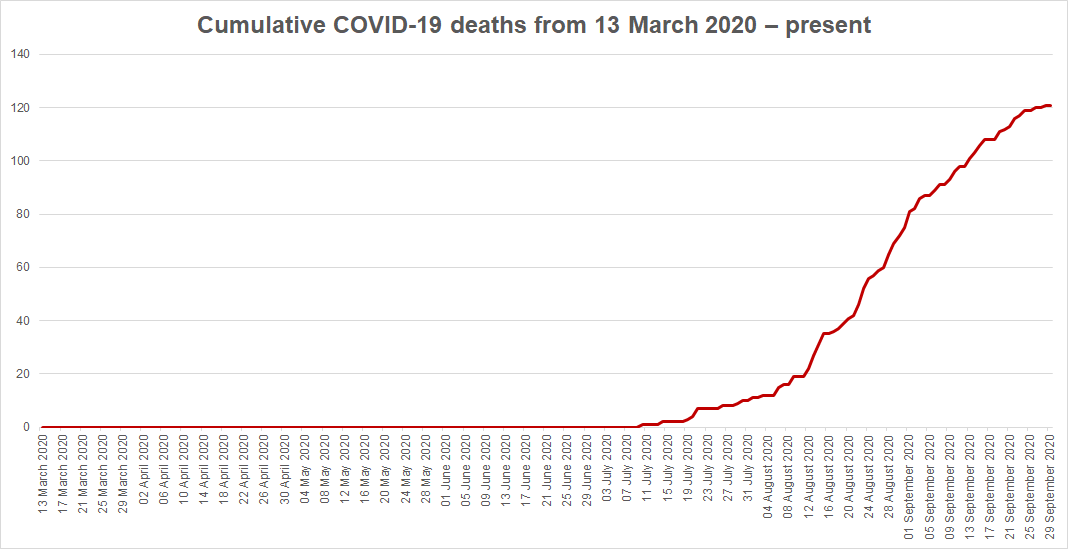
A graph showing the cumulative number of COVID-19 deaths in Namibia since initial day of infection. Note: As of 29 September 2020.

=== Confirmed deaths per day ===
View source data.

=== Figures per region ===
All 14 regions are known to have COVID-19 positive patients.

A table showing cumulative COVID-19 figures per region
Region	Total confirmed cases	Deaths	Recovered
Khomas Region	9,237	87	7,637
Erongo Region	4,641	44	4,273
Hardap Region	856	7	793
!Karas Region	1,021	7	703
Otjozondjupa Region	712	7	442
Oshana Region	1,060	12	827
Oshikoto Region	538	1	476
Ohangwena Region	252	2	234
Kavango East	253	3	208
Omaheke Region	189	5	155
Zambezi Region	90	0	82
Omusati Region	121	1	90
Kunene Region	231	3	114
Kavango West	8	1	7
Unknown/Unallocated	0	0	0
Total	19,299	180	16,041
Note: Data as of 21 December 2020 15:00 (local time).

=== Testing data ===
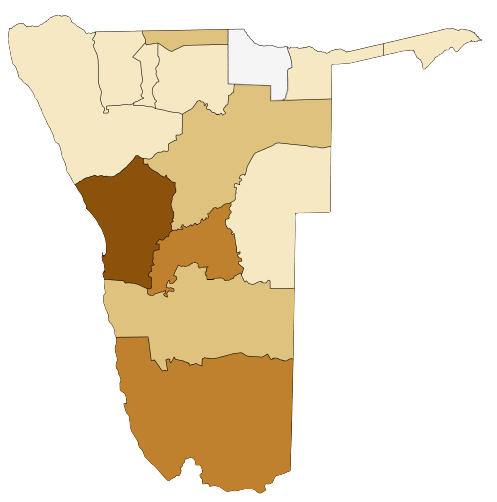
A map showing the cumulative number of COVID-19 tests carried out per region. Updated 23 July 2020. 6,000+ 1000-5999 500-999 1-499 No data

Testing for COVID-19 is done by two entities (one public and one private) throughout Namibia. State testing is done by Namibian Institute of Pathology (NIP) while private testing is done by PathCare.

Erongo region, which is the region with the most cases nationwide, leads with the number of tests performed.

Khomas and !Karas regions also have high number of tests carried out. Windhoek, the capital, is situated in Khomas region and is where the initial infections were reported. !Karas region houses many quarantine facilities for Namibians returning from abroad. Many people enter here from South Africa (which it borders at the south) and have thus a higher number of tests carried out compared to other regions.

As of 29 September 2020, a total of 97,008 tests were carried out.

== Government preparation and responses ==
=== Initial reactions ===
==== Suspension of flights and state of emergency ====
In a first reaction on 14 March, when the first cases were confirmed, government suspended air travel to and from Qatar, Ethiopia and Germany for 30 days. Later, on 18 March 2020, all ports of entry were closed from highly affected countries (i.e. most Schenghen countries). All public and private schools were closed for a month, and large gatherings were prohibited. This included celebrations for the 30th anniversary of Namibian independence that was to take place on 21 March. Libraries, museums, and art galleries were also closed.

On 17 March President Hage Geingob declared a state of emergency as a legal basis to restrict fundamental rights, e.g. to freely move and assemble, guaranteed by the Constitution. The prohibition of large gatherings was clarified to apply to 50 or more people. The health ministry also established an Emergency Response team, operating 24/7, which aimed to intensify the surveillance of COVID-19 in the country, especially at the borders of Namibia.

==== Access to information, surveillance ====
A COVID-19 communication hotline (0800100100) was established on 15 March 2020 which is run by the Ministry of Health and Social Services and the Centre for Disease Control of Namibia (CDC). The hotline serves to answer general enquiries of the public, assisting persons seeking guidance from the Ministry and reporting possible symptoms or cases of COVID-19.

The Government also announced on 18 March that it will strengthen their communication to the public via various platforms, such as the COVID-19 communication centre operated by NBC, in an attempt to "mitigate and refute misinformation, fear and panic especially from social media". The centre was fully functional by middle April 2020.

With the establishment of a multi-disciplinary Emergency Response team, the Ministry intensified their surveillance in monitoring the situation of COVID-19 in the country, especially at the borders of Namibia. The response team operates 24/7.

Screening at all points of entry has become mandatory. All Namibians returning from high risk areas were to go under mandatory quarantine for 14 days; all costs are covered by the Government.

==== Schools, tertiary education ====
As per the regulations of stage 1 and the proclamation of the State of Emergency, all schools, early development childhood centres and tertiary institutions should be closed, and attendance is prohibited. Schools are to reopen in a phased manner - necessitating the grades with higher priorities and workload (see below).

==== Military field hospital ====
A class two military field hospital was established at the Hosea Kutako International Airport to deal with persons identified with possible symptoms and as a quarantine facility.

The Central State Hospital, amongst others, also underwent renovations to its emergency rooms and ICU wards to allow it to operate in a COVID-19 environment.

==== Testing ====
Before the confirmation of COVID-19 in Namibia, tests could not be done locally. Instead, samples had to be sent to South Africa for testing, which accounted for longer than usual waiting times. Namibian Institute of Pathology (NIP) started testing locally in Windhoek at the end of March 2020. In late April, private laboratory company PathCare started testing samples. Namibia was hit by a lack of reagents at the end of April, which slowed down testing. Private testing at PathCare is expensive (about N$850) compared to state (NIP) testing which is free to the patient. At the end of April, 362 tests had been conducted, 206 by the Namibian government through the Namibian Institute of Pathology (NIP), and 156 by South African laboratories.

On 1 July, the Health Ministry announced that there is substantial backlog of laboratory results. Results announced at this time dated back to samples tested almost a week before that. The Ministry however said they were "working on this matter" together with the Namibian Institute of Pathology. As of 1 July, 9,551 tests were carried out.

==== Economic stimulus package ====
An Emergency Income Grant was set up by government to distribute N$ 750 to every person that lost income or faces otherwise difficult conditions due to the lockdown. Over 800,000 people applied for this grant. 346,000 of them were paid by the end of April.

=== Lockdown ===
==== Khomas & Erongo regions ====
Beginning 27 March, a 21-day lockdown of the regions of Erongo and Khomas was announced as per regulations of stage 1 (see below).

This was the initial lockdown of the two main economic hubs; the "heart" of the Namibian economy.

==== National ====
On 14 April the lockdown was extended to 4 May. It now officially applied to all regions, although the stay-at-home order had already been enforced countrywide. Some of the lockdown conditions were amended, such that now fishing counted as essential service, and open markets as well as informal trade were allowed to operate. Namibia moved into stage 2 on 5 May 2020. Namibia moved to stage 4 on 29 June 2020. Namibia reverted to stage 3 for 16 days on 13 August.

==== Erongo region ====
The city of Walvis Bay was moved back to stage 1 on 28 May because two infected people came into contact with local people. The rest of the country entered stage 3 on 2 June 2020. On 8 June the lockdown of Walvis Bay was extended to all of Erongo Region for 14 days after a worrying spike in cases in the region - constituting a full lockdown. This lasted until 23 June, when the whole region migrated to stage 3. The constituencies of Walvis Bay, Swakopmund and Arandis are excluded, although travel are allowed for emergency reasons only.

== Reopening of the economy ==
=== Lockdown stages ===
President Hage Geingob announced on 30 April the gradual reopening of the economy in various stages. Each stage will have an observance period of 28 days - twice the incubation period of COVID-19.

The addition of stage 5 was announced on 22 June 2020 by the President, Hage Geingob. This stage constitutes the "new normal" which will last until the end of the state of emergency.

Different stages of lockdown in Namibia from March until the end of the state of emergency.
Stage 1	28 March 2020 — 4 May 2020, for Walvis Bay additionally 29 May 2020 — 8 June 2020
Stage 1	Stage 1 constitutes a full lockdown. Some guidelines: Closure of all points of entry.; Restrictions on domestic travel; a permit will be needed for inter-region travel. Exempted: essential goods transportation.; Public gatherings not allowed; limited to 10 people.; Compulsory quarantine and self-isolation for returning Namibians.; Only essential businesses allowed to operate; other employees to work from home.; Closure of all schools, tertiary institutions and early childhood development centres.; Personal movement restricted.; Motor vehicle passenger restrictions.; Sale of alcohol strictly prohibited.
Stage 2	5 May 2020 — 31 May 2020
Stage 2	Stage 2 constitutes a lockdown with some easing of restrictions. Some guidelines: Closure of all points of entry.; Comprehensive restrictions on cross-border travel. Exempted: essential goods transportation.; Compulsory quarantine and self-isolation for returning Namibians.; Public allowed to travel between regions/municipalities (except if stated otherwise).; Motor vehicle passenger restrictions.; Domestic air travel permitted if safety regulations are followed (screening, disinfecting).; Public gatherings not exceeding 10 people.; All schools and tertiary institutions remain closed - alternate forms of teaching should be used.; Productive activities across most sectors to reduce given that safety precautions are met.; Theatres, gyms, exercise centres, liquor stores remain closed. Shopping malls may operate given they do screening, keep registers and follow safety guidelines.; Employees with existing medical conditions encouraged to work from home.; Ongoing strengthening of the healthcare system.
Stage 3	2 June 2020 — 29 June 2020 (for Walvis Bay starting 9 June), 13 August — 11 September 2020
Stage 3	Stage 3 constitutes a moderate reopening of the country & economy, however with some restrictions. Some guidelines: Closure of all points of entry; Cross-border movement restrictions remain in place. Some exceptions.; Public gatherings and social distancing protocols to be reviewed. Public gatherings limit: 50 people.; Some high-risk activities (gyms, movie theatres, schools) to reopen with strict hygiene measures in place.; Restaurants allowed to operate, reservations required.; Sale of alcohol allowed on certain times of the day.; Reduced restrictions for vulnerable persons.
	30 June 2020 — 12 August 2020
Stage 4	This stage resembles the "new normal" for most citizens. More restrictions are lifted. Some guidelines: Points of entry remain closed, except for the transportation of goods. A targeted International Tourism Revival Initiative will be conducted between 15 July - 15 August 2020 which will look to accommodate a limited number of tourists into Namibia after this period.; Each person is required to wear a facemask.; Resumption of domestic air travel.; Quarantine protocols remain in place: All Namibians and non-Namibians should present themselves with a COVID-19 PCR test upon arrival.; Mandatory quarantine and self-isolation for returning citizens - at own cost.; 6 July only: Schools, tertiary institutions, early development childhood centres & activities resume for some grades.; Current grades allowed: 11 & 12; except: Walvis Bay, Swakopmund & Arandis.; Public restrictions on gatherings reviewed; public gatherings now allowed for 250+ persons. Other hygiene measures are still in place: social distancing, wearing of face masks, strict hand-washing, logbooks etc. Contact sports may commence.; The health care system will be strengthened during this period.; Sale of alcohol for on-site consumption allowed. Reservations necessary.
Stage 5	? — end of state of emergency
Stage 5	The 5th stage resembles the "new normal" for citizens. Still under review.: Moderate opening of borders to selected countries.; Public gathering limitations reviewed.; Quarantine protocols: may be reviewed or removed.

=== Return to normal ===
Prior to the lapse of the lockdown a 4-stage strategy was developed to gradually ease restrictions:

1. The lockdown itself is stage 1.
2. In stage 2 most businesses are allowed to operate again, and people are allowed to move around. Employees over 60 and those chronically sick are to work from home. In public a face mask is to be worn, and social distancing is still to be implemented. Gatherings of more than 10 people, contact sports, bars and gyms are not allowed, alcohol may not be sold, and international borders remain closed.
3. Stage 3 is envisaged to follow 28 days after stage 2, twice the incubation period of the virus. It will allow the reopening of schools and universities and a gradual opening of borders. Public gatherings of up to 20 people will be permitted.
4. Stage 4, again 28 days after stage 3, is planned as the full return to pre-pandemic regulations with the exception of large gatherings. Borders remain closed and health protocols remain in place. Public gatherings increase to 250+ people.
5. Stage 5 is the final stage where most restrictions are lifted or reviewed. This stage is intended to last until there is a vaccine for the virus.

Namibia moved into stage 2 on 5 May 2020. The city of Walvis Bay was moved back to stage 1 on 28 May because two infected people came into contact with local people. The rest of the country entered stage 3 on 2 June 2020. On 8 June the lockdown of Walvis Bay was extended to all of Erongo Region for 14 days.

=== Education ===
The resumption of face-to-face teaching was phased to resume during August, but has subsequently changed due to changing conditions. The Namibian Ministry of Education, Arts and Culture have on multiple stages altered the resumption of face-to-face teaching mainly due to student and teacher unions' demands.

The academic year was extended to 18 December 2020 for all grades.

=== Curfew, revert to stage 3 ===
On 31 July, the health minister announced a relaxation in quarantine protocols that would account for faster recovery rates. Patients with a positive COVID-19 result were automatically regarded as recovered 10 days after their infection, given that they did not display symptoms anymore. According to the minister, "it has been proven that a person may test positive for COVID-19, for many more week after the symptoms have resolved. However, this does not mean such person is still infective or poses a risk to infect others".

On 12 August 2020 when President Hage Geingob addressed the nation in his 15th COVID-19 media conference, it was announced that all 14 regions will revert to stage 3 after "the confirmation of clustered community transmission". The president announced that a curfew will be introduced in the local constituencies of Windhoek (and surround areas), Walvis Bay, Swakopmund and Arandis. The curfew will be in effect from 20:00 until 05:00 the next morning. Additional measures (amongst others) included:

- Restaurants may only operate on a take-away basis (stage 2 restrictions).
- Nightclubs, casinos and gambling houses not allowed to operate.
- Increased mass testing in Windhoek where "clustered community transmission" has been confirmed.

On 28 August, this stage was extended until 11 September. The curfew now applied to everyone nationwide.

=== End of COVID-19 measures ===
In July 2022, government ended all national restrictions. In August 2022, six small border posts that had remained closed throughout the pandemic, were reopened. The only remaining restriction is that international travellers have to produce a document showing they are vaccinated, or a negative PCR test.

== Assistance ==
=== Aid ===
==== Diagnostic kits ====
On 18 March 2020, Kalumbi Shangula, on behalf of the Ministry of Health and Social Services, received a donation of 1 000 diagnostic test kits from the Chinese Ambassador Zhang Yiming. This was to increase the testing capacity of COVID-19 in the country.

On 28 March, Namibian bank Bank Windhoek donated 500 reagent- and swop testing kits.

==== Financial, electronics ====
On 21 March 2020, the Ministry of Health received a monetary donation from the Rössing Uranium Limited company to help fight the spread of COVID-19 in Namibia. Incident Manager, Mrs. M. Kavezembi received N$200 000.00 on behalf of the Ministry.

Old Mutual Namibia donated electronics worth N$998 030.46 to the Health Ministry "to facilitate the process of rapid case search, contact tracing and data management". The donation included 35 laptops and 37 tablets.

==== Humanitarian ====
The Indian community in Namibia, with support from the High Commission of India in Windhoek (India's diplomatic mission) contributed food packets and essential supplies for Namibian people severely affected by the COVID-19 lockdown in April 2020.

==== PPE, other medical supplies ====
In the first months of the pandemic, the Namibian Health Ministry received face masks and other personal protective equipment from various international sources.

- The CDC country director, Eric Dziuban, provided such supplies for the staff operating at the Emergency Operations Centre.
- Sanlam Namibia (via its CEO, Tertius Steers) donated face masks and a mobile van for testing and screening.
- WHO, through its representative in Namibia, Charles Sagoe-Moses, donated face masks and testing kits.
- The Republic of Turkey donated surgical masks, N95 masks, medical overalls, and other equipment. According to Namibia's Health Ministry, "it has been very difficult ... to secure a desirable stock level of these essential supplies". The Ministry said "the donation is appreciated indeed and will go a long way in addressing the shortfall".

=== Cooperation ===
On 2 June 2020, The president had a telephonic call with Canadian prime minister Justin Trudeau. President Geingob "expressed appreciation to Canada for the support during the liberation struggle and the principled positions leading to the implementation of Resolution 435." The president also shared concerns with regard to COVID-19 figures in Namibia and the reopening of the economy. Prime Minister Trudeau also pledged support to President Geingob on the issue of classification of Namibia as an upper middle-income country, informing that with "climate change, other countries, specifically those from the Caribbean also faced a similar challenge of classification as upper middle-income countries".

== Impact on society ==
=== Misinformation ===
In early April 2020, reports on social media originated stating that 5G is a direct cause of COVID-19. Namibia's mobile telecommunications monopoly, MTC, denied these claims in a statement saying that Namibia does not have 5G installed yet.

=== Panic buying ===
Caused by ambiguous information from government, a short wave of panic buying ensued in the last week of March in the Erongo Region and selected shops in Windhoek. Several shops increased prices for hygiene products and fruits for private brewing. The events were being investigated by the Namibian Competition Commission.

=== Crime rates ===
Due to the lockdown, crime rates, road accidents and rape decreased significantly. Hospitals reported fewer admissions due to alcohol-related violence but went "back to normal" on the first day the alcohol sales ban was lifted again.

=== Education ===
Many students expressed their concerns regarding the late reopening of schools. A change.org petition, labelled "Motion for schools to open earlier for grade 11s and 12s in Namibia" has gained over 2,500 signatures in an attempt to convince the Ministry of Education, Arts and Culture to open schools earlier.

After a concerning spike in cases in the country in late July, especially in the capital, classes for pre-primary grades and grades 1-9 were suspended. Only grade 10-12 were allowed to attend face-to-face classes.

== See also ==
- COVID-19 pandemic in Africa
- COVID-19 pandemic by country and territory
- COVID-19 recession in Namibia
