= Richard Kamwi =

Namibian physician and politician (born 1950)

The Honourable Richard Nchabi Kamwi
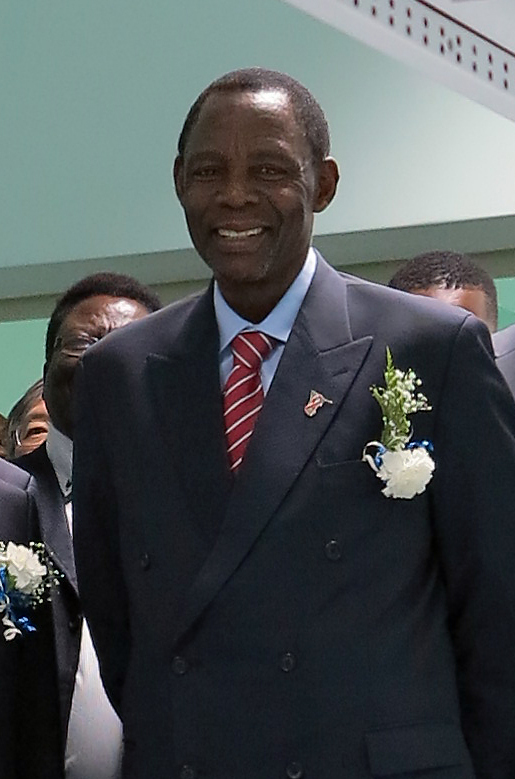
- Richard Kamwi

Minister of Health and Social Services
- In office March 2005 – 21 March 2015
- President: Hifikepunye Pohamba
- Preceded by: Libertina Amathila
- Succeeded by: Bernard Haufiku

Deputy Minister of Health and Social Services
- In office March 2000 – 21 March 2005
- President: Sam Nujoma

Personal details
- Born: 10 March 1950 (age 76) Ioma, Zambezi Region
- Party: SWAPO
- Occupation: Medical physician, politician

Richard Nchabi Kamwi (born 3 June 1950 in Ioma, Zambezi Region) is a Namibian medical physician and politician. A member of the National Assembly with the South West Africa People's Organization since 1999, Kamwi was the Minister of Health and Social Services from March 2005 to 2015.

After graduating from the Technikon Mmadikoti in Pietersburg, South Africa in 1980, Kamwi became the first black health inspector in Katima Mulilo. After being relieved of his position in 1984, and subsequently arrested for political subversion in 1985, Kamwi went into exile in Botswana. He served in the People's Liberation Army of Namibia until repatriation in 1989.

Kamwi resumed his position of health inspector until joining the National Assembly in 1999. In 2000, President Sam Nujoma appointed him to the post of deputy Minister of Health and Social Services under Libertine Amathila. Upon the promotion of minister Amathila to the post of deputy Prime Minister along with the election of president Hifikepunye Pohamba, Kamwi was promoted to minister. He served until 2015, and then took up farming on farm Rimini in the Otavi-Tsumeb-Grootfontein triangle.

== Awards ==
Kamwiwas was awarded The Most Brilliant Order of the Sun second-class for his distinguished service above the call of duty, in August 2024 by President Nangolo Mbumba.
