= Miss Grand Namibia 2015 =

Beauty pageant edition

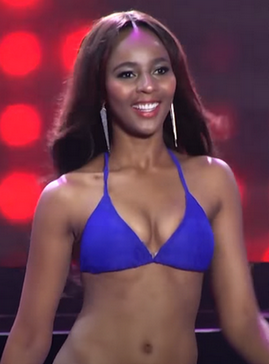
- Unongo Kutako, Miss Grand Namibia 2015, during the international competition in Thailand.
- Date: July 4, 2015
- Venue: National Theatre of Namibia, Windhoek
- Entrants: 12
- Placements: 5
- Original winner: Linda Amadhila (Oshana)
- Replacement: Unongo Kutako (Khomas)

Miss Grand Namibia 2015 was the inaugural edition of the Miss Grand Namibia beauty pageant, held on July 4, 2015, at the National Theatre of Namibia in the country's capital, Windhoek, where a second-year library and information sciences student from the University of Namibia, Linda Amadhila of Oshana, was announced the winner, outclassing national finalists from other eleven country's regions. Meanwhile, Fransiska Mbambo of Hardap and Jessica Ramires da Cunha of Otjozondjupa were named the first and second runners-up, respectively.

Amadhila was expected to represent the country in the 2015 edition of the Miss Grand International pageant in Thailand in October, but she resigned from the title for unrevealed reasons caused the organizer, Magnolia Events Management, to appoint one of the contest's finalists, Unongo Kutako, to compete instead, but was unplaced at the international stage.

The event consisted of 43 national candidates who competed in different categories, which included Little Miss Grand Namibia (ages 8 to 10), Miss Pre-Teen Grand Namibia (ages 11 to 14), Miss Teen Grand Namibia (ages 15 to 17), and Miss category (ages 18–27). Other than the Miss category, the winners of other categories also gained the right to represent Namibia internationally.

The following list is the national finalists of the Miss Grand Namibia 2015 pageant.

- Erongo – Waewen Proudium Kharugas
- Hardap – Fransiska Mbambo
- Kavango East – Rollinia Shahungu
- Kavango West – Celine Freyers
- Khomas – Unongo Kutako
- Kunene – Illenrenuska Dentlinger
- Ohangwena – Helvi Pewa Shiweda
- Omaheke – Paulina Andreas
- Omusati – Liesel Amanda Engelbrecht
- Oshana – Linda Amadhila
- Oshikoto – Anna Shaapopi
- Otjozondjupa – Jessica Ramires da Cunha
