= Miss Grand Namibia =

National beauty pageant in Namibia

- Established: 4 July 2015; 10 years ago
- Founder: Magnolia Kuhanga
- Dissolved: 2018
- Type: Beauty pageant
- Headquarters: Windhoek
- Location: Namibia
- Members: Miss Grand International
- Official language: English
- President: Magnolia Kuhanga
- Parent organization: Magnolia Events Management (2015 – 2018)
- Website: MissGrandNamibia.com

Miss Grand Namibia licensee timeline

Miss Grand Namibia was a national female beauty pageant in Namibia, established in 2015 by Magnolia Kuhanga, chairperson of the Windhoek-based organization Magnolia Events Management (ML Events Artistry). The contest was held on three occasions—in 2015, 2016, and 2018—with the winners intended to serve as Namibia’s representatives at the international platform, Miss Grand International. However, all three titleholders ultimately withdrew from the international competition for unspecified reasons, with only one being replaced by an appointed delegate.

The pageant ceased operations in late 2018 following the expiration of the collaboration between the national organizer and Miss Grand International Limited, after which no alternative domestic institution sought to assume the franchise. Since its initial participation in 2013, Namibia has not secured a placement at Miss Grand International.

== History ==
Namibia first participated in Miss Grand International in 2013, when Grace Khakhane was appointed as the country’s representative. In 2015, Magnolia Events Management under Magnolia Kuhanga acquired the franchise and launched the Miss Grand Namibia pageant. The contest was held three times—in 2015, 2016, and 2018—but none of the winners competed internationally; in 2015, Unongo Kutako, a finalist, was appointed to replace the original winner, Linda Amadhila, at the international stage.

In 2016, regional preliminaries were introduced with the first Miss Swakopmund in Erongo Region, and the national crown was awarded to Esperance Luvindao in Windhoek. The final edition in 2018 concluded with Rail Lucas of Ohangwena Region as the winner. Since then, Namibia has not returned to Miss Grand International, and the franchise has remained inactive.

== Editions ==
The following list is the edition detail of the Miss Grand Namibia contest, since its inception in 2015.

Edition	Date	Final Venue	Entrants	Miss Grand Namibia	Ref.
1st	July 4, 2015	National Theatre of Namibia, Windhoek	12	Linda Amadhila	
2nd	July 9, 2016	National Theatre of Namibia, Windhoek	17	Esperance Luvindao	
3rd	March 3, 2018	Safari Hotel, Windhoek	N/A	Rail Lucas	

== Titleholders ==
List of Namibian representatives at the Miss Grand International pageant

Year	Delegate	National Title	Competition Result		National director	Ref.
Year	Delegate	National Title	Placements	Other Award(s)	National director	Ref.
2013	Grace Diaz Khakhane	Appointed	Unplaced	—	Andy Abulime	
2014	Maila Kalipi	Appointed	Unable to compete		Andy Abulime	
2015	Linda Amadhila^{[α]}	Miss Grand Namibia 2015	Unable to compete		Magnolia Kuhanga	
2015	Unongo Kutako^{[β]}	Miss Grand Namibia 2015 — Finalists	Unplaced	—	Magnolia Kuhanga	
2016	Esperance Luvindao	Miss Grand Namibia 2016	Unable to compete		Magnolia Kuhanga	
2017	Ruusa Angula	Miss Grand Namibia 2016 — 1st Runner Up	Unable to compete		Magnolia Kuhanga	
2018	Rail Lucas	Miss Grand Namibia 2018	Unable to compete		Magnolia Kuhanga	
2019–Present: No representatives
Notes: 1. ^α Resigned or dethroned.; 2. ^β Took over the title after the original winner resigned/was dethroned.
