= Libertina Amathila =

Namibian physician and politician

The Honorable Libertina Amathila
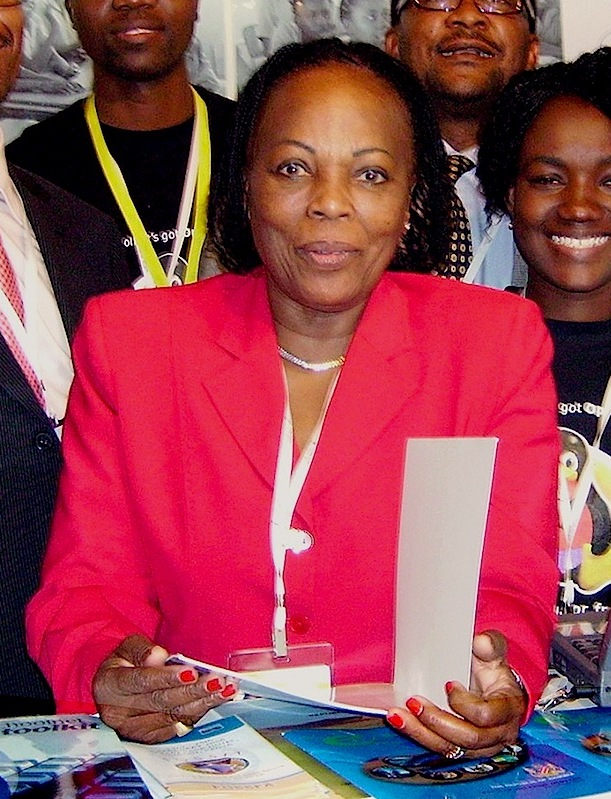
- Amathila in 2005

Deputy-Prime Minister of Namibia
- In office March 2005 – March 2010
- President: Hifikepunye Pohamba
- Preceded by: Hendrik Witbooi
- Succeeded by: Marco Hausiku

Minister of Health and Social Services
- In office 1996–2005
- President: Sam Nujoma
- Preceded by: Nickey Iyambo
- Succeeded by: Richard Kamwi

Minister of Regional and Local Government and Housing
- In office 21 March 1990 – 1996
- President: Sam Nujoma
- Preceded by: position established
- Succeeded by: Nickey Iyambo

Personal details
- Born: Libertina Inaviposa Appolus; 10 December 1940 (age 85) Fransfontein, Kunene Region
- Party: SWAPO
- Spouse: Ben Amathila
- Occupation: Politician
- Profession: Medical doctor

Libertina Inaviposa Amathila (née Appolus, born 10 December 1940) is a Namibian physician and politician. She was Namibia's first female doctor and served as the Deputy-Prime Minister of Namibia from March 2005 to March 2010.

Amathila is a member of the SWAPO Party of Namibia. She began working in SWAPO refugee camps following her education. She advocates for access to education and healthcare in Namibia.

== Personal life ==
Libertina Amathila was born in Fransfontein, Kunene Region, Namibia. Family was important for Amathila during childhood. She had a close relationship with her grandmother and mother, who pushed her to receive an education. Amathila did not have a relationship with her biological father, but obtained a relationship with her step father.

Amathila was inspired to become a doctor after seeing hospital conditions when her mother became sick. Amathila's interest in politics sprouted from witnessing apartheid throughout her life. Instances of violence such as the Windhoek Shootings, resonated with Amathila and many other young people.

After attending secondary school, she left Namibia and became a refugee, with intentions of reaching Dar es Salaam, Tanzania. With the help of SWAPO, Amathila received a scholarship to study medicine in Poland under the SWAPO Nationhood Programme. She graduated from the Warsaw Medical Academy in 1969, becoming Namibia's first female doctor. She later worked in SWAPO refugee camps.

Amathila is married to fellow politician, Ben Amathila.

== Education ==
Amathila experienced segregated schooling prior the introduction of Bantu Education in Namibia. She attended Otjiwarongo Primary School, Lutheran Mission Primary School at Fransfontien, and Augustineum Secondary School prior to attending Wellington High School and obtaining a Senior Certificate in Cape Town, South Africa (1955 – 1957). At Augustineum Secondary School, her classmates included: Ben Amathila, Hage Geingob, Theo-Ben Gurirab, and Katuutire Kaura.

In 1962, she went into exile and lived in Tanzania, where she applied for, and received, a scholarship to study at Warsaw Medical Academy (now called the Medical University of Warsaw) in Poland where she received a Bachelor of Medicine, Bachelor of Surgery (M.B. Ch.B) and became the first female doctor in Namibia.

After completing her medical education in Poland, she received a medical license in Sweden from the Karolinska Institute. She continued her education in the United Kingdom prior to returning to work in various positions within SWAPO including a postgraduate diploma in Nutrition (1972) and Public Health (1978) from the London School of Hygiene and Tropical Medicine.

Other accomplishments of her's include a financial course for non-financial managers from Colombia University (1993), an Advanced Executive Programme at UNISA (1992), and a diploma in Epidemiology and French in Bamako, Mali (1980 – 1983).

== Political career ==
At SWAPO's 1969 consultative congress in exile in Tanzania, Amathila became deputy secretary for health and welfare on the SWAPO central committee and director of the SWAPO Women's Council. Immediately before independence, she was a SWAPO member of the Constituent Assembly, which was in place from November 1989 to March 1990, and since independence in March 1990, she has been a member of the National Assembly of Namibia. Following independence, Amathila was one of four parliament members who were women.

=== 1990-2010 ===
From the independence of Namibia in 1990 until 2013, Amathila was as a member of the Namibian Parliament. She was Minister of Regional and Local Government and Housing from 21 March 1990 to 12 September 1996, at which point she became Minister of Health and Social Services, serving in that position until becoming Deputy-Prime Minister of Namibia on 21 March 2005. In September 1999, she was elected for a one-year term as chairperson of the World Health Organization's Regional Committee for Africa, and on 15 May 2000 she was elected as the president of the 53rd Session of the World Health Assembly. She received the tenth highest number of votes—363—in the election to the central committee of SWAPO at the party's August 2002 congress.

Other accomplishments include an internship at Mushimbili Teaching Hospital in Dar es Salaam (1969-1970), Director of SWAPO Women's Council (1970-1989), and Director of Health on SWAPO Election Directorate (1989).

== Retirement ==
Amathila retired from politics on the 20th anniversary of Namibia's independence, on the 21st of March 2010. After her retirement, Amathila continued to be in contact with her communities. She published her autobiography, Amathila: Making a Difference in 2012 with the intention of inspiring young Namibian women with her story. She discusses topics including: education, family, apartheid, politics, and exile.

As of 2024, Amathila remains present in Namibian communities. Though retired, Amathila encourages the health and education of young generations in order to support the country.

In 2013, Amathila became aware of the Otjomuru Combined School in Otjomuru, Kunene Region, Namibia through a community program. She then continued to provide the school with materials and invest in town infrastructure The school grew in size, and appreciate the help of Amathila. In 2023, Otjomuru Combined School was renamed Libertine Inavipisa Vihajo-Appollus Combined School in her honor. In 2021, Amathila assisted a visually impaired elderly couple from the Oshikoto Region of Namibia by constructing a home and providing them with medical care.

== Awards and recognition ==
Amathila received the Ongulumbashe Medal for Bravery and Long Service in 1987, and was a 1991 recipient of the Woman of the Year award in Namibia and the Nansen Refugee Award.

In 2002, she named the street Brückenstrasse in Swakopmund, Erongo, Namibia after herself.
