= Ministry of Health and Social Services (Namibia) =

Government ministry of Namibia

The Namibian Ministry of Health and Social Services was established at Namibian independence in 1990. The first Namibian health and social services minister was Nickey Iyambo. Followed by minister Kalumbi Shangula, former chief of medical services at the People's Liberation Army of Namibia (PLAN). The current minister is Dr. Esperance Luvindao. Hambeleleni Ndjaleka as deputy minister who was appointed by president Netumbo Nandi-Ndaitwa on the 7 April 2026

== Ministers ==
All health and social services ministers in chronological order are:

#	Picture	Name	(Birth–Death)	Party	Term start	Term end
Minister of Health and Social Services
1		Nickey Iyambo	1936–2019	SWAPO	1990	1996
2		Libertina Amathila	1940–	SWAPO	1996	2005
3		Richard Kamwi	1950–	SWAPO	2005	2015
4		Bernard Haufiku	1946–	SWAPO	2015	2018
5		Kalumbi Shangula	1948–	SWAPO	2018	2025
6		Dr. Esperance Luvindao	1994–	SWAPO	2025	present
