= Bernard Haufiku =

Namibian politician and physician

Bernard Shidute Haufiku is a Namibian medical doctor and politician. He served as Minister of Health and Social Services from 2015 to 2018. During his tenure as minister, Haufiku voiced views against corruption and in favour of legalising abortion.

Haufiku attended school at Onamhidi Combined School and at Onheleiwa Combined School, both in Omusati Region. He studied medicine at the University of the Witwatersrand and graduated with Bachelor of Medicine and Bachelor of Surgery degrees. He also holds a Diploma in anesthesiology.

He was appointed to the Parliament of Namibia in 2015 by president Hage Geingob representing the ruling SWAPO party until 20 December 2018 when he was replaced by Kalumbi Shangula. He then became special adviser to vice president Nangolo Mbumba on health matters. In early August 2020, president Hage Geingob terminated Bernard Haufiku's role as special advisor on health matters in the presidency effective immediately.

In 2021, Pendukeni Iivula-Ithana Primary School, previously part of Onamhidi Combined School where Haufiku attended in 1978, was renamed after him.
