= Esperance Luvindao =

Namibian physician (born 1994)

Honorable Esperance Luvindao

Minister of Health and Social Services
- Incumbent
- Assumed office 22 March 2025
- President: Netumbo Nandi-Ndaitwah
- Preceded by: Kalumbi Shangula

Personal details
- Born: 1994 (age 31–32) Windhoek, Namibia
- Party: SWAPO
- Education: University of Namibia School of Medicine
- Website: osaatafrica.com

Esperance Luvindao is a Namibian politician, medical doctor, public health advocate, and international speaker. In March 2025, Luvindao was appointed as Namibia's Minister of Health and Social Services, making her the youngest health minister in African history.

== Early life and education ==
Luvindao was born in Namibia in 1994. She attended Martti Ahtisaari Primary School in Windhoek before transferring to St Paul's College, where she completed Grade 12. Luvindao obtained her Bachelor of Medicine and Bachelor of Surgery (MBChB) degrees from the University of Namibia School of Medicine

== Career ==
In 2019, she founded Osaat Africa Health Foundation, focusing on women's health education, contraceptive access, and digital health solutions. The foundation launched Menga, a digital platform for medication access in informal settlements, and Emily's Health, a book on women's health published in eight native languages. She played a key role in Namibia's vaccine campaign during the COVID-19 pandemic, and has continuously advocated for equitable healthcare access.

In March 2025, Luvindao was appointed as Namibia's Minister of Health and Social Services, making her the youngest health minister in African history.

=== Other ventures ===
Luvindao directed Speaker's Globe, a public-speaking training institution.

In 2022, she won second place at the United Nations Young Entrepreneur Awards for her contributions to digital health and women's empowerment.
