= Kalumbi Shangula =

Namibian politician

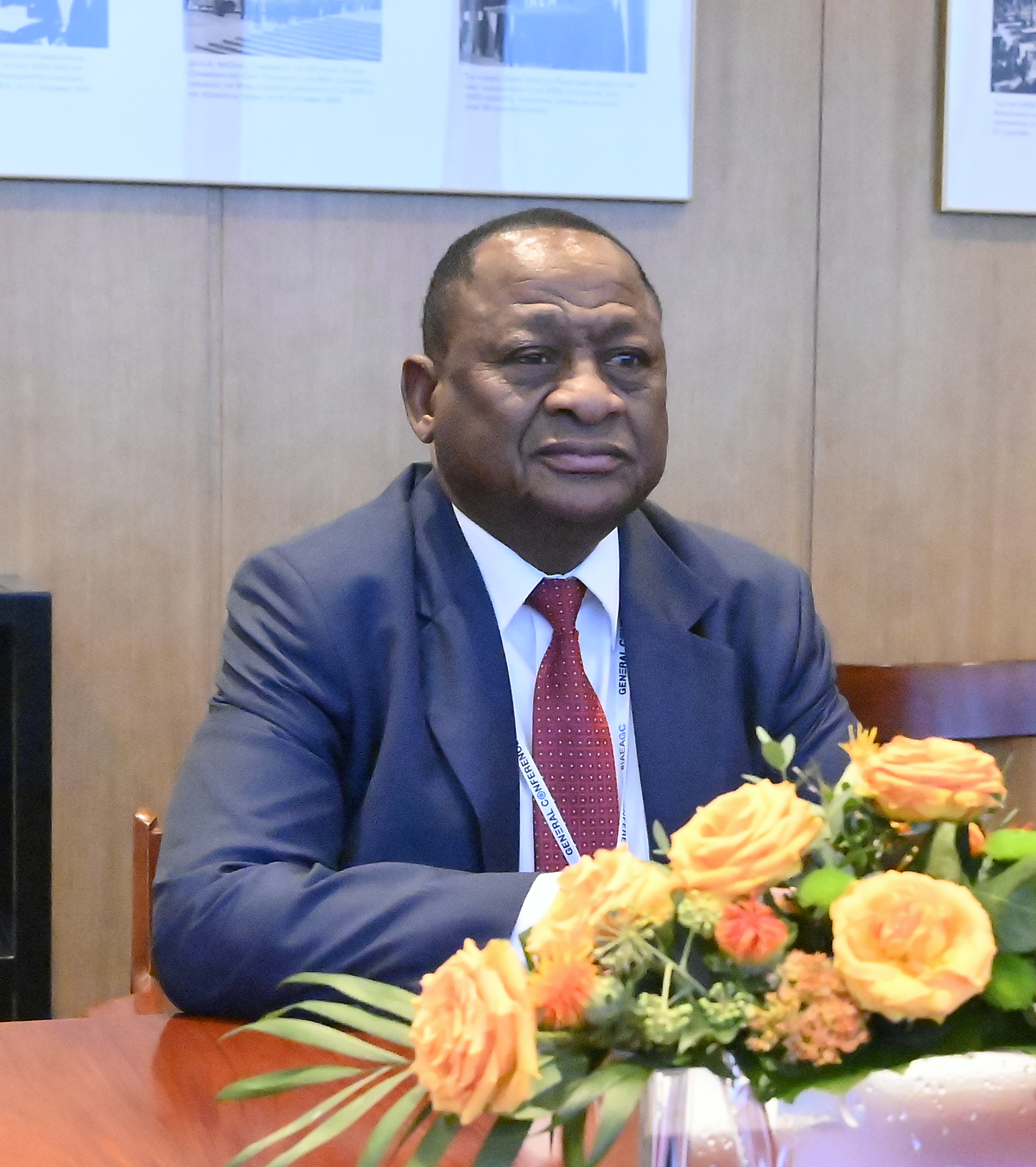

Minister of Health and Social Services
- In office 20 December 2018 – 21 March 2025
- President: Hage Geingob
- Preceded by: Bernard Haufiku

Personal details
- Born: 8 August 1948; Etilyasa, Omusati Region
- Political party: SWAPO
- Spouse: Elizabeth Hinananye Shangula
- Profession: Medical doctor, Politician

Kalumbi Shangula (born 8 August 1948) is a Namibian doctor and politician from the SWAPO Party. He was a minister of Health and Social Services from 19 December 2018 to 21 March 2025.

== Early life and education ==
Shangula was born as third of ten children on 8 August in Etilyasa in what is today Omusati Region. He completed matric at Ongwediva High School. His tertiary degrees are a diploma in public health from Harvard University and a MSc in medicine from University of London, an MD from Moscow, and an MBA from Maastricht.

== Career ==
After graduation Shangula worked as a medical officer, first as intern, then as health officer, superintendent, and regional health director. During the armed fight for Namibian independence Shangula rose to be chief of medical services at the People's Liberation Army of Namibia (PLAN). After independence he ran his own medical practice before taking up an academic career at the University of Namibia. His last position there was assistant pro-vice chancellor.

Already a member of SWAPO Shangula then entered into politics, becoming permanent secretary of the Ministry of Health and Ministry of Environment and Tourism. Until 2017, Shangula also served as managing director of SWAPO's own group Kalahari Holdings. Shangula entered Parliament in December 2018 on an appointment by president Hage Geingob. He immediately assumed the position of minister of Health and Social Services, replacing Bernard Haufiku.

As health minister, Shangula led Namibia's COVID-19 response, ordering a travel ban and partial lockdown in March 2020.

== Personal life ==
Shangula was married to the Namibian pathologist Elizabeth Hinananye Shangula from July 28, 1981, until her death in 2008.
