= National Theatre of Namibia =

Coordinates: 22.5624°S 17.0854°E

- Company type: non-profit
- Industry: Entertainment
- Founded: 1989
- Fate: open
- Headquarters: Windhoek, Namibia
- Website: www.ntn.org.na

The National Theatre of Namibia is the state theatre in the Namibian capital Windhoek. The National Theatre promotes the development, conservation and maintenance of dramatic arts in Namibia. It was founded on August 15, 1989 under its current name and its present structure as a "non-profit purpose" but before that was already known as the South West Africa Performing Arts Council. It is located in the Windhoek Central Business District, next to the National Art Gallery of Namibia.

The National Theatre is funded through donations, government grants and entrance fees. In the 1990s, the financial resources were very limited, so only irregularly performances were held. Since the beginning of the 2000s there is a regular game plan, and stage plays, operas, concerts and musicals are performed.

The theater consists of various rehearsal rooms and the main hall with 471 seats and a smaller hall with 250 seats.
