= Kupferhof Bauschenberg =

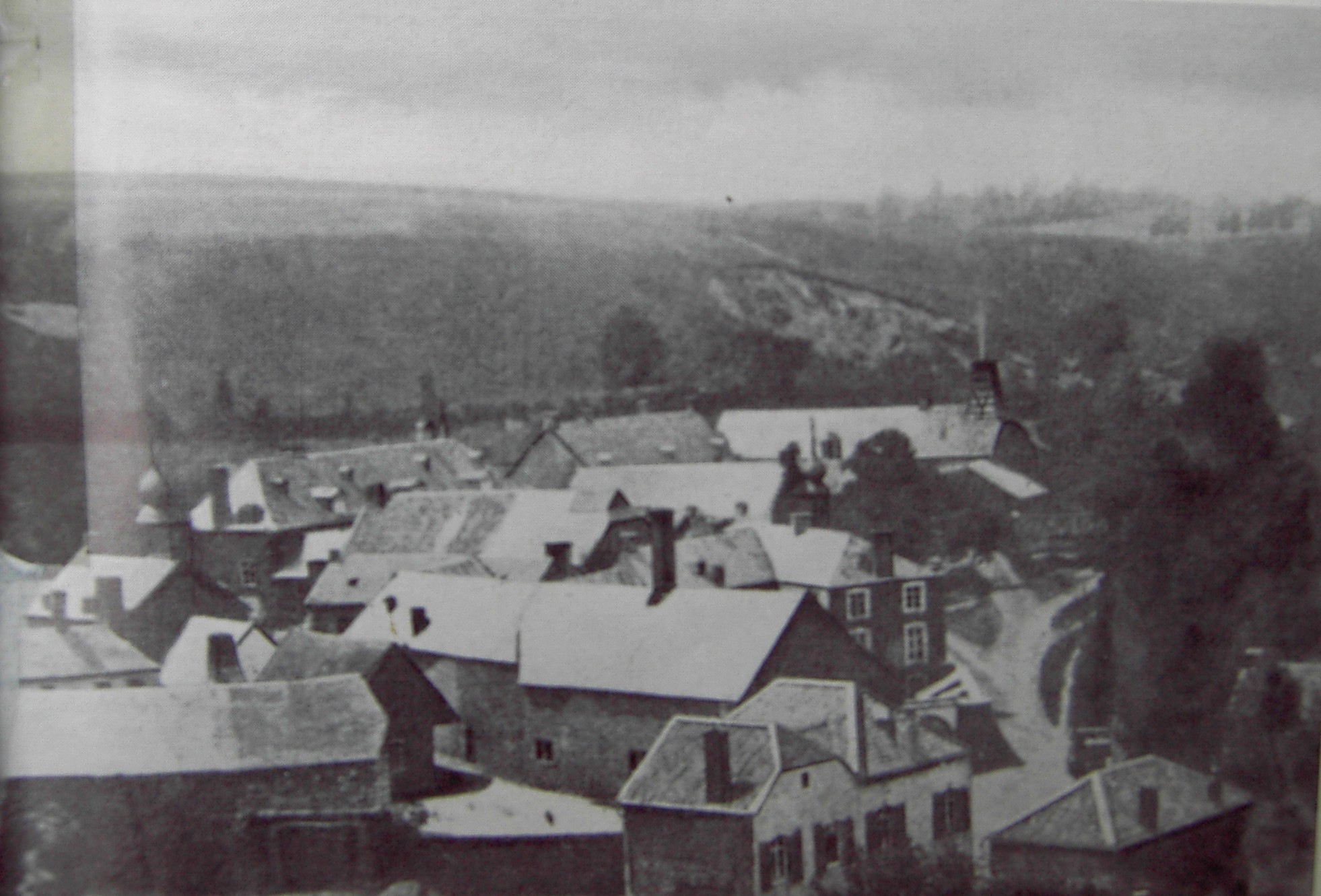
Dollartshammer, Kupferhof Bauschenberg and Straßburger Hof in 1880

Kupferhof Bauschenberg was one of many brass producing factories built in the 17th century in the German city of Stolberg. Bauschenberg, the name of a small hill, gave the factory its name.

Kupferhof Bauschenberg had a great influence on the brass industry in the city which made Stolberg the world leader in brass production for more than a century.

Stolberg offered excellent conditions for brass production at that time. Rivers like the Vichtbach, which passes by the factory, supplied the power to move the water wheels. Calamine, a major component of the alloy, was delivered by the ore mines at Breinigerberg as well as Diepelinchen. Wood for firing the furnaces was available in adequate quantities in the forests of the Eifel. Godfried Schardinel, one of the richest industrialists at that time in Stolberg, as well as the nearby city of Aachen, therefore chose Stolberg for building the Kupferhof Bauschenberg.

Over the next few centuries, Kupferhof Bauschenberg merged with Dollartshammer and Straßburger Hof to build the company Prym.
