= Adler-Apotheke =

Coordinates: 50°45′59″N 6°13′59″E

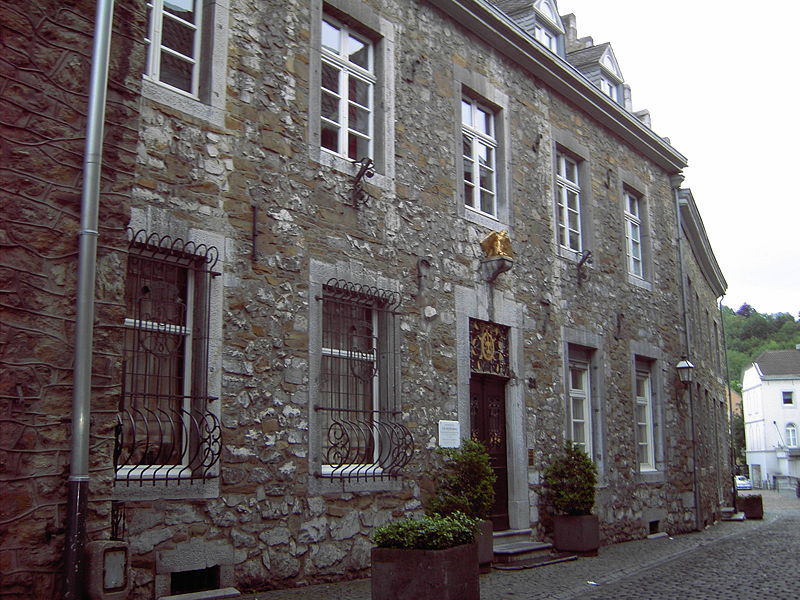
Adler-Apotheke in 2008

The Adler-Apotheke was a former brass producing factory in the German city of Stolberg. The building was founded in 1575 by Leonard Schleicher. In the 18th century it became the first pharmacy in the district of Aachen. Currently the building is protected as a cultural heritage.

== Adler-Apotheke as a brass producing plant ==
After buying the estate in 1571 Leonard Schleicher, a brass producer who lived in the nearby city of Aachen moved to Stolberg and established a brass producing factory known as Schleicher’s yards in 1575 at this location. His successful work motivated other brass producers to move to Stolberg. The conditions for doing work were perfect. Smithsonite could easily be delivered by the nearby ore mines of Breinigerberg, wood for firing the melting furnaces had been available in adequate quantities in the woods of the Eifel and the water wheels could be powered by the small river Inde. This was the beginning of the most successful brass production worldwide. For nearly 200 years Stolberg owned a monopoly on brass. After Leonard Schleicher’s death his family took over the plant but sold it 1750 to the Hausmann family.

== Pharmacy ==
The Hausmann family owned the Adler-Apotheke since 1750 but did not have the licence for practising. Due to a Prussian law established in the Rhineland in 1815 Steve Hausmann was forced to sell the pharmacy. Supported by the mayor of Stolberg he hesitated to do that for nearly one year. On December 15, 1815 a contract was signed with a Dutch pharmacist. Whether the Dutchman took over the pharmacy is not known as on April 16, 1816, the major wrote to the Prussian government that he supported the sale of the pharmacy. Whether he supported a successor to the Hausmann family or one to the Dutch owner is unknown. His proposal for the new owner was rejected. It took until April 20, 1816, before Gerard Jacob Welter took over the Adler-Apotheke. The sales price was 20 Thalers.

The first years seem to pave the way to a successful future. In 1821 the situation threatened to change. A pharmacist from Nideggen tried to build a branch office in the neighbouring village of Kornelimünster. Welter was able to stop that for a limited time but in 1837 a competitor obtained permission to open a pharmacy. Welter got into severe financial problems and was forced to reduce his personnel. In February 1857 he sold the pharmacy to his son, Ludwig Adolph, who had to pay 14.000 Thalers to his father as well as board and lodging to his siblings. After the death of Gerard Jacob an additional 9500 Thalers had to be paid to his relatives. Ludwig Adolph Welter died surprisingly on November 5, 1878, due to a heart attack. His assistant Anthony Jungboldt took over the pharmacy but gave up the business on April 1, 1880. John Gerald Eduard Welter succeeded him.

John Gerald Eduard Welter, a nephew of Ludwig Adolph did not have any education as a pharmacist. He had not started his studies in pharmacy. But the existing law permitted him to own the pharmacy while it was operated by the pharmacists Jungboldt and Sieberichs. As a sales price John Gerald Eduard paid 106.500 Mark to Ludwig Adolph’s relatives. After finishing his studies in 1897 John Gerald Eduard modernised some parts of the building. Documents even mentioned that the pharmacy moved for a limited time to another building but returned on August 3, 1898 to the 21 Burgstrasse, where it was before.

After John Gerald Eduard Welter died without a true heir the pharmacy was sold for 260.000 Marks to Joseph Hollmeyer. He modified the private area of the building. The business area was not changed. On October 1, 1928 Charles Schwarz acquired the Adler-Apotheke as its last owner. Charles Schwarz retired in 1961 but it took until September 1, 1971, before the pharmacy was completely given up.

Currently the building is used as an apartment house.
