= Calamine (mineral) =

Zinc ore group

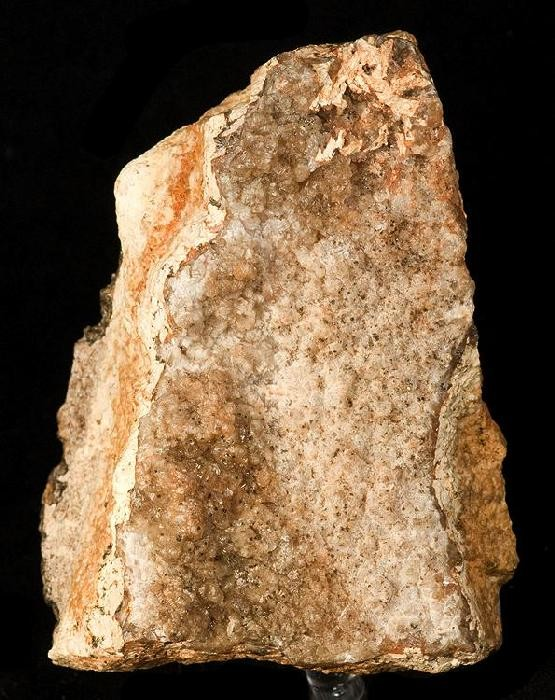
Specimen of calamine from mine at Granby, Missouri

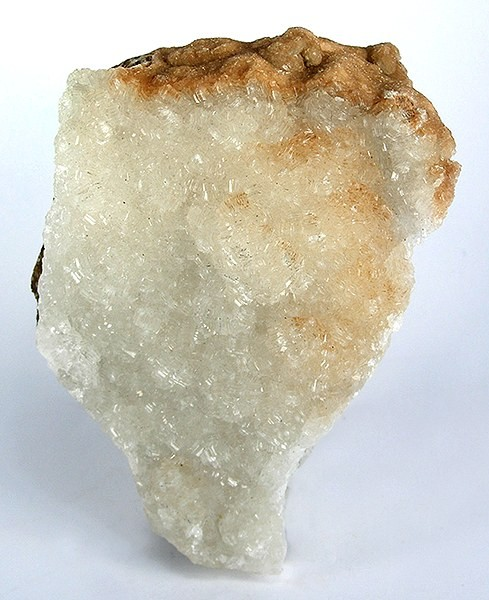
Crystalline zinc ore sourced from the Sterling Hill mine, New Jersey

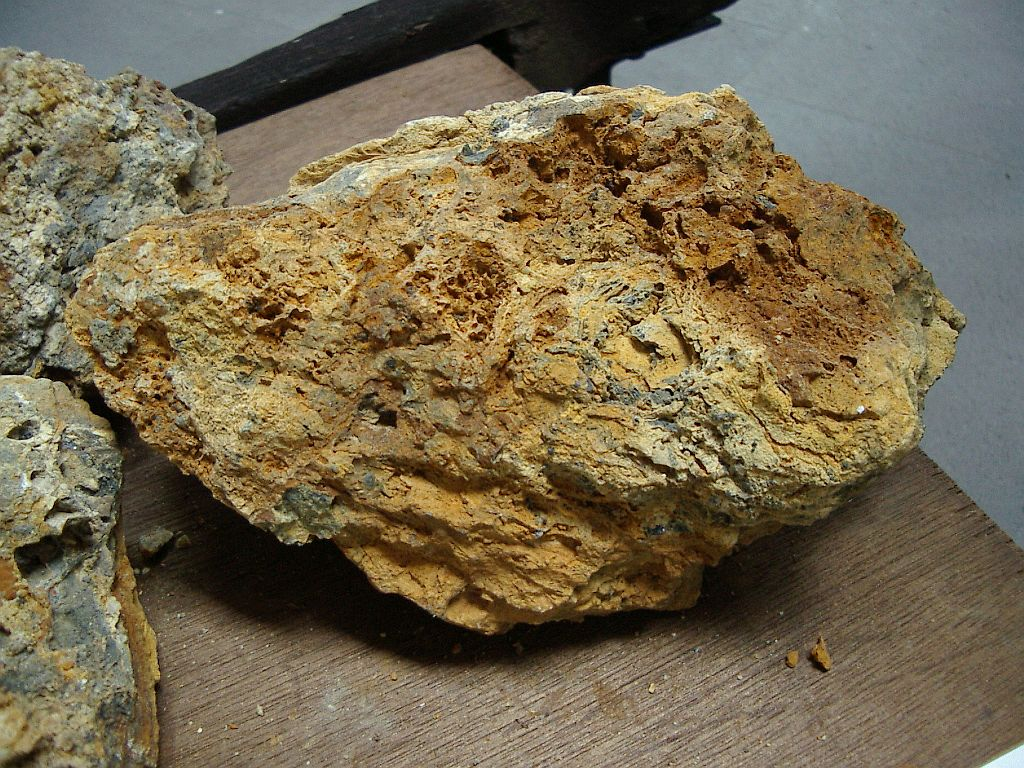
Mined example from the 17th century brass-producing town of Stolberg, Jülich

Calamine is a historic name for an ore of zinc. The name calamine was derived from lapis calaminaris, a Latin correption of Greek cadmia (καδμία), the old name for zinc ores in general. The name of the Belgian town of Kelmis, La Calamine in French, which was home to a zinc mine, comes from this. In the 18th and 19th centuries, large ore mines could be found near the German village of Breinigerberg.

During the early 19th century it was discovered that what had been thought to be one ore was actually two distinct minerals:

- Zinc carbonate ZnCO_{3} or smithsonite and
- Zinc silicate Zn_{4}Si_{2}O_{7}(OH)_{2}·H_{2}O or hemimorphite.

Although chemically and crystallographically quite distinct, the two minerals exhibit similar massive or botryoidal external form and are not readily distinguished without detailed chemical or physical analysis. The first person to separate the minerals was the British chemist and mineralogist James Smithson in 1803. In the mining industry the term calamine has been historically used to refer to both minerals indiscriminately.

In mineralogy calamine is no longer considered a valid term. It has been replaced by smithsonite and hemimorphite in order to distinguish it from the pinkish mixture of zinc oxide (ZnO) and iron(III) oxide (Fe_{2}O_{3}) known as calamine lotion.

== Early history ==
In the 16th century demand for latten (brass) in England came from the needs of wool-carding, for which brass-wire combs were preferred, and battery pieces (brassware formed by hammering sheet brass in a battery mill). The only known method for producing the alloy was by heating copper and calamine together in the cementation process and in 1568 a royal charter was granted to the Society of the Mineral and Battery Works to search for the mineral and produce brass, to reduce dependence on imported metal from Germany. Factories to exploit the process were established at Isleworth and Rotherhithe. By the late 17th century enough was known of metallic zinc to make brass solder directly by combining copper and spelter (zinc ingots). In 1738 a patent was granted to William Champion, a Bristol brass founder, for the large-scale reduction of calamine to produce spelter. There were many calamine mines in Shipham, not far from William Champion's brass works.

In 1684 a paper presented to the Royal Society described the medicinal and veterinary properties of the compound when in finely powdered form. Since then no mechanism of action for the powder has been identified, and as of 1992 the only medical effect of the powdered mineral appears to be its ability to absorb moisture secreted from irritated and weeping skin.
