= Lebollo la banna =

Traditional practice of male initiation

Lebollo la banna is a Sesotho term for male initiation.

Lebollo is a cultural and traditional practice that transitions boys in the Basotho society to manhood. It is a rite of passage where bashanyana or bashemane (transl. "uncircumcised boys") pass puberty and enter adulthood to become monna (transl. "men") by circumcision. This practice is primarily found among Basotho men in Lesotho, the Free State and some parts of the Eastern Cape Province of South Africa. In the Free State, the prevalence of traditional male circumcision among the Sotho people is at 60.4%

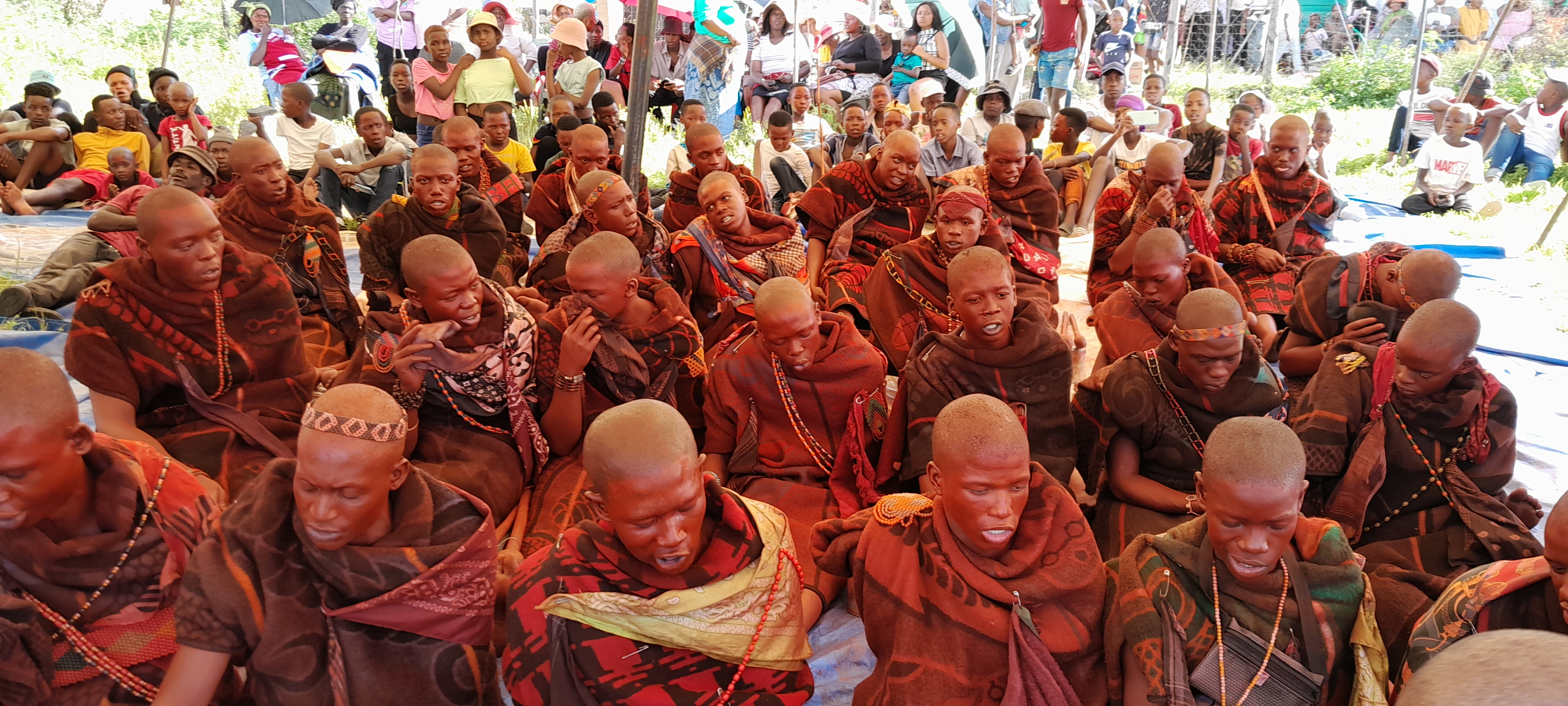
Basotho initiates, Matatiele.

Despite much criticism directed towards lebollo, there is an increase in the number of boys attending traditional initiation schools in post-apartheid South Africa. This is argued to be due to the resurgence of young men's respect for traditional authority as well as the government support of research reporting reduced risk of HIV infection when circumcised. Many government-based organizations provide clinical circumcision, but many Basotho still opt for circumcision at traditional initiation schools due to cultural beliefs.

== Description ==
Traditional Basotho initiation schools are conducted over a period of time (varying from a few weeks to six months) in secluded areas away from settlements, which are often referred to as "the bush" or "the mountain". Traditional initiation teachers, known as basuwe in Sesotho, are commonly elderly men with substantial economic, political, and social standing within Basotho communities. The basuwe perform rituals and teach the initiates about cultural and health issues. A monga lebollo is the one who establishes lebollo in a particular area and owns the particular initiation school. They are sometimes given a position in informal education school governing bodies in order to assist and advise schools on the behaviors and needs of the new initiates.

== History of lebollo ==
Initiation rites among the South Sotho became central to both the homestead and the chieftainship in the 19th century. It was the chief who periodically called upon all boys of a certain age (usually between 16 and 20 years of age) to undergo the ritual.

With Basotho societies being colonised by settlers in the 1800s, the new colonial government set laws to regulate and restrict the time and location of the practice. The government also dispatched officers to different Basotho chiefs from 1944 and 1945 to determine if the Basotho communities were obeying the laws. Basotho chiefs such as Kgama, Sebele, Lentswe, and Bathoeng were praised for having been loyal to the laws of the colonial government's administrative High Commissioner on initiation. Chief Lentswe had been successfully practicing male initiation since his reign began in 1874, and was able to name eight mophato (transl. "regiments"). Eighteen years later, Lentswe converted to Western Christianity, which prohibited him from supporting traditional Sotho practices such as lebollo. Although he declared that there would be no initiation practice by his people, they continued to prepare themselves for initiation anyway.

In 1902, Lentswe authorized an initiation school after being persuaded from his people. The Basotho initiation ritual did not reoccur until 1975 when other chiefs took over and reintroduced the practice. Before 1975, parents who took their children to the "bush school" were excommunicated from the Christian church community along with their children. In order to be accepted back into the community, they had to undergo church rituals of repentance and cleansing. Currently, not all community members practice initiation, but some certain families uphold the practice.

== Age and time ==
The age of initiation has changed as school learners in the past or any child under the age of 24 years were not initiated. Males who were over the age of 24 were referred to as batlankana as they had passed adolescence and were ready to uphold their family social responsibilities according to customs and traditions. Currently, most initiates from the Free State and Lesotho attend initiation between the ages of 12 and 15 with only a few initiated above the age of 15. The boys usually attend the initiation school during the holiday break between primary school and high school. Changes to the age of initiates are influenced by migration patterns of adult males leaving their homestead to work in cities or mines and South African laws that require children to attend school. Generally speaking, an initiation school is open to young pubescent males, but in some cases, adults can also attend such a school in cases where the particular individual could not attend such a school while still young.

== Phases of lebollo ==
The initiate practice can be classified into three stages: the separation stage, the transitional stage, and the incorporation stage. The psychosocial theory by Erik Erikson provides a basic tool of analysis to examine the phases of initiation for the Basotho boys.

=== The separation stage ===
During the separation stage, boys are separated from all social activities and kept in a secluded place where their transition from adolescence into adulthood takes place.

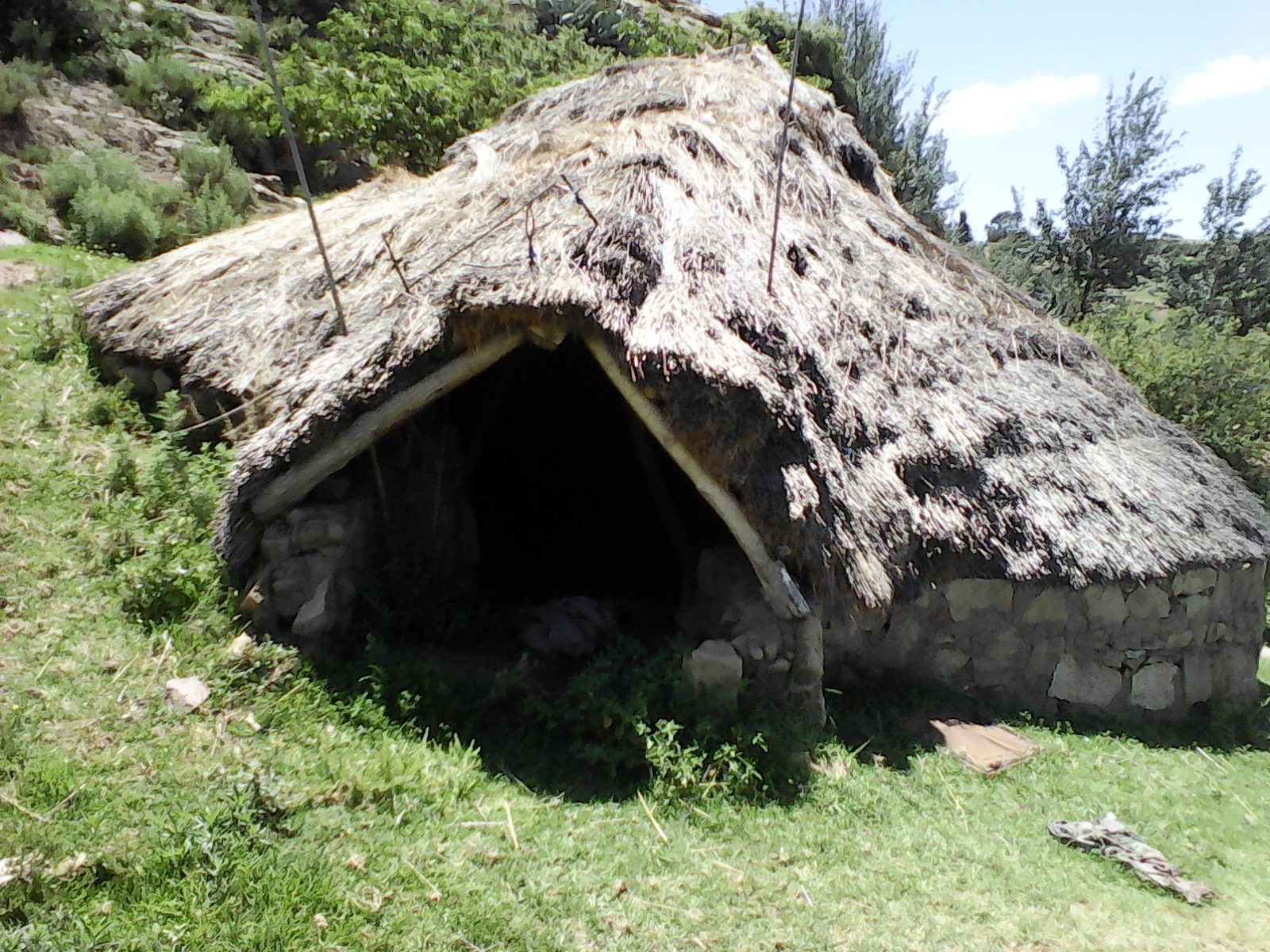
This small house is used by the boys to sleep in during their time in initiation school.

=== The transitional stage ===
In the transitional stage, the initiates are educated on the social concepts of their identities. For about eight days after the surgical procedure, a traditional nurse (ikhankatha) provides nursing care. The initiates are housed in lodges called mophato.

The initiates rise early each day to perform a variety of tasks and undergo a harsh physical regimen. Skills, such as warfare and cattle-raiding are taught and improved. Initiates are also taught to compose praises and songs to their chiefs and to themselves, the proper expression or articulation of which constitutes the important adult (male) quality of eloquence, bokheleke. The initiates are tutored on the knowledge of family life, including sexuality, which is dealt with extensively. The texts of praise poems (lithoko) refer to a wide range of phenomena, including historical occurrences where former Basotho chiefs featured, and significant experiences in the life of the initiates.

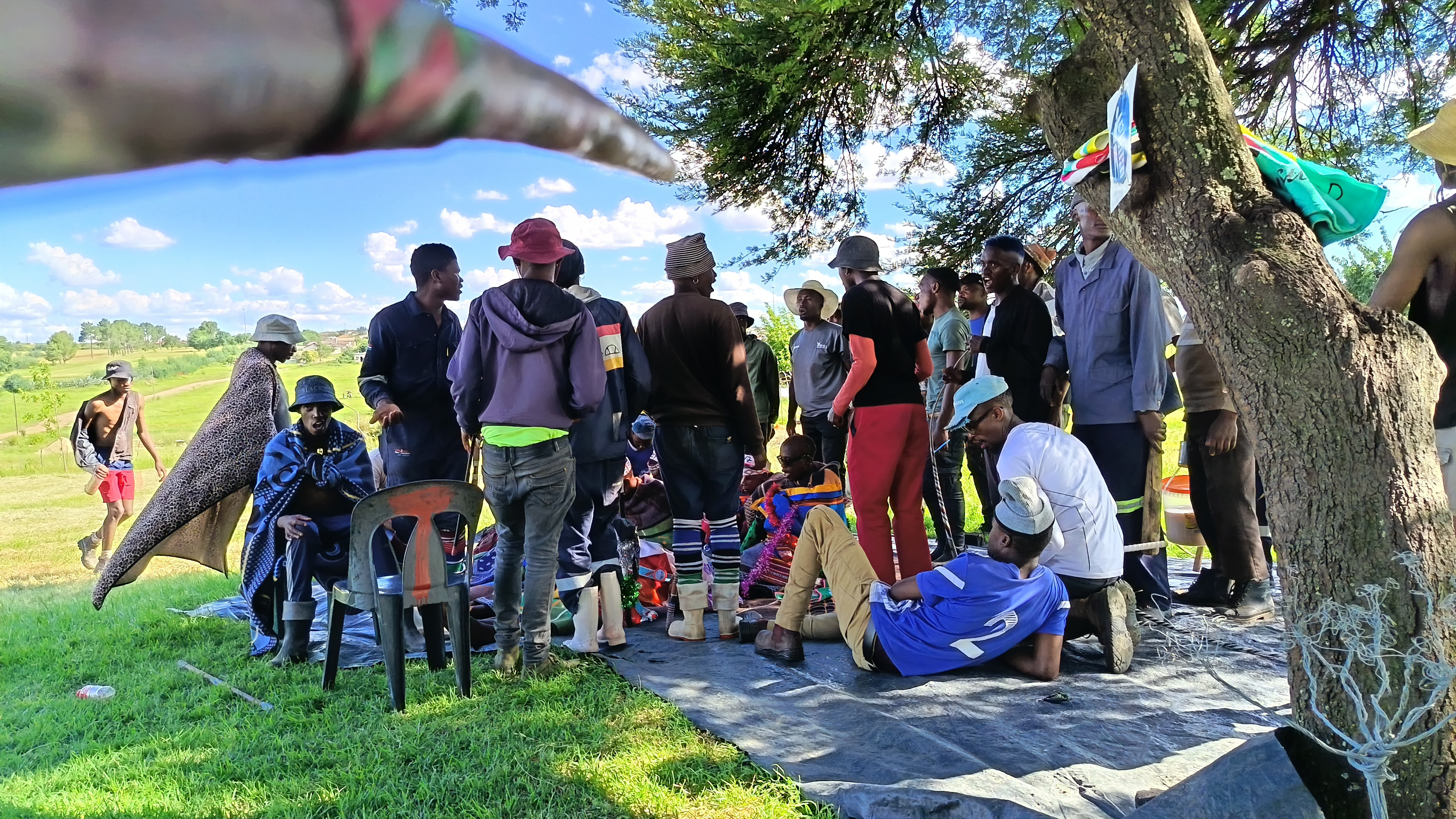
Basotho initiates arriving home from initiation school.

After completing their training, The initiates arrive at their villages smeared with Letsoku (red ochre) and covered in traditional Basotho blankets while surrounded by men and elders, where they are given a new set of clothes. A large feast commences shortly thereafter and each new initiate is given an opportunity to verbalise his own self-composed praise.

=== The incorporation stage ===
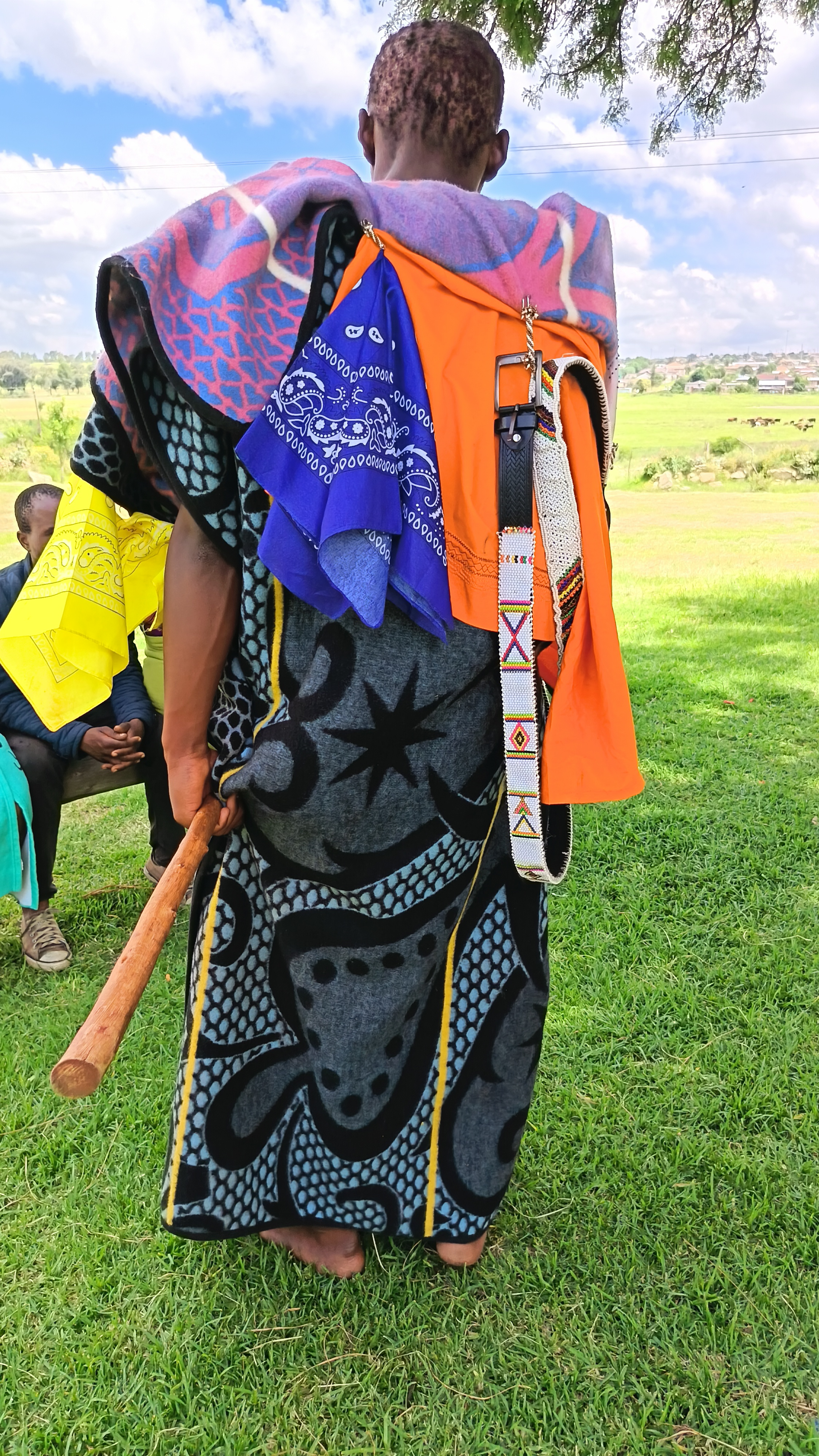
Lekolwane.

The incorporation stage occurs when the newly initiated Basotho men are incorporated into society. They are given new names, which are selected for each individual and confirms the "man's existence", as well as blankets to wear as proof that they have reached manhood. Sometimes the names given after initiation become more popular than the names given at birth.

Initiates are then allowed to participate in social and economic activities. It is considered taboo for newly initiated men to share details of lebollo with females and males who have not been to initiation school. Men who are working, married, and initiated see those that are uncircumcised as inferior. The uninitiated are often ridiculed for not practicing their cultures, and are sometimes seen as "weak" men.

== Effects on behavior ==
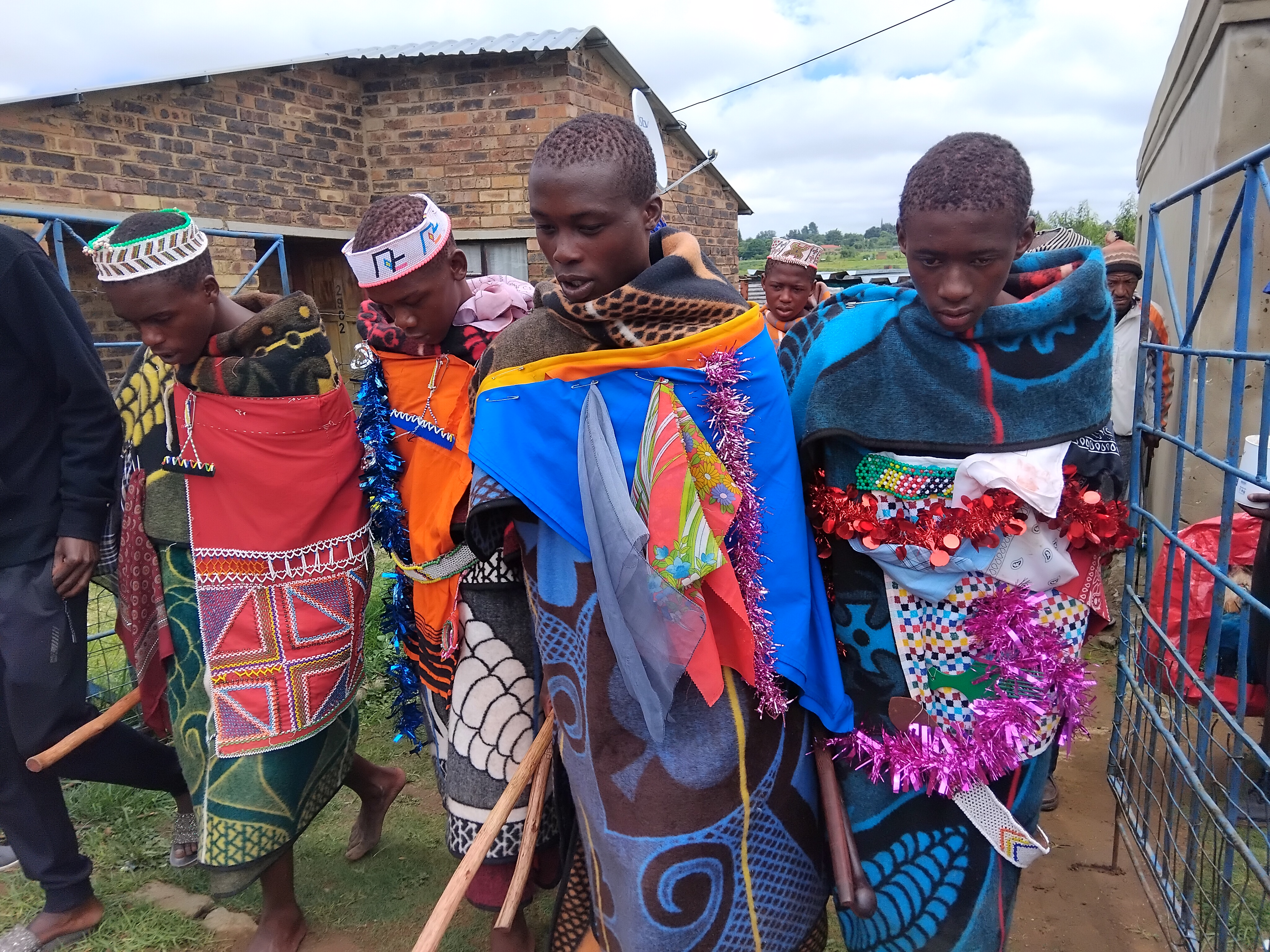
Makolwane, Basotho initiates.

There are varying opinions on whether traditional initiation schools make a positive or negative contribution to the behaviour of initiated Basotho boys and men. Proponents of lebolla believe that the practice produces good moral values in boys and men, and contributes to society by creating responsible law-abiding citizens. The newly initiated, who are seen as men by the larger traditional society, are still seen as boys by the formal education system which means that the status of manhood granted by the ritual is situational.

Opponents of the initiation schools believe that lebolla has little effect on the actions and behaviour of the initiated boys and men. Many formal school teachers struggle to deal with boys returning from initiation schools due to deviant behaviour such as a refusal to participate in class, acting with disdain towards female teachers and uninitiated male teachers, as well as involvement in gangster activities.

The traditional responsibilities after initiation include taking care of their fathers' homesteads, working hard to support themselves and their families, upholding their clan name, and being present at all family and ritual ceremony gatherings. Additionally the initiate is expected to be brave, prove to be a responsible male adult, respect other people, have self-respect and self-discipline, be independent, and abide by laws. However, the responsibilities of an initiate have changed throughout time to meet modern societal needs to include not abusing alcohol, avoiding imprisonment or criminal activities, avoiding multiple sexual partners, avoiding contracting HIV/AIDS, and attaining an education in order to become a financial provider. Privileges after initiation include receiving respect from women and those who have not yet attended initiation schools, sitting and eating with initiated men during rituals and ceremonies, as well as gaining general respect from all members of the community.

== Complications ==
According to the Commission for the Promotion and Protection of the Rights of Cultural, Religious, and Linguistic Communities in South Africa, approximately 251 male youths died between 2014 and 2016 while attending initiation schools throughout South Africa. During a period of 36 weeks between 2014 and 2016, about ten deaths occurred due to complications during traditional circumcision. There was a total of 22 documented deaths related to circumcision between June 2012 to January 2017.

Complications arise in the traditional initiation schools when the traditional surgeons use blunt and unsterilized instruments, which cause infection and sepsis. Further negative effects occur when the physical punishment becomes so severe that it results in some initiates being beaten to death.

== Laws ==
The National House of Traditional Leaders, which has advisory authority over traditional initiations in South Africa, believes that it would be better able to control initiation rites if it was empowered to make laws. The traditional leaders of the national house rejected a proposal by the government suggesting that boys be circumcised in hospitals instead of "the bush". The House argued that the attendance of an initiation school is not only about the physical removal of the foreskin, but also about the promotion of cultural activities, although they acknowledge that beating the initiates is not a cultural activity.

Many traditional leaders accept that initiation schools should not run concurrently with academic schools. The Free State Initiation Schools Health Act of 2004 was promulgated with the specific purpose to provide for adherence to health standards in traditional initiation schools as well as to provide for the granting of permission for the performance of circumcision operations. The act also makes provisions for the approval process by which initiation schools are to be established.

== See also ==
- Mokorotlo
- Circumcision in Africa
- Ulwaluko
