= Waelz process =

Rotary Kiln Recovering Method

The Waelz process is a method of recovering zinc and other relatively low boiling point metals from metallurgical waste (typically electric arc furnace flue dust) and other recycled materials using a rotary kiln (waelz kiln).

The zinc enriched product is referred to as waelz oxide, and the reduced zinc by product as waelz slag.

== History and description ==
The concept of using a rotary kiln for the recovery of Zinc by volatization dates to at least 1888. A process was patented by Edward Dedolph in 1910. Subsequently, the Dedpolph patent was taken up and developed by Metallgesellschaft (Frankfurt) with Chemische Fabrik Griesheim-Elektron but without leading to a production scale ready process. In 1923 the Krupp Grusonwerk independently developed a process (1923), named the Waelz process (from the German Waelzen, a reference to the motion of the materials in the kiln); the two German firms later collaborated and improved the process marketing under the name Waelz-Gemeinschaft (German for Waelz association).

The process consists of treating zinc containing material, in which zinc can be in the form zinc oxide, zinc silicate, zinc ferrite, zinc sulphide together with a carbon containing reductant/fuel, within a rotary kiln at 1000 °C to 1500 °C. The kiln feed material comprising zinc 'waste', fluxes and reductant (coke) is typically pelletized before addition to the kiln. The chemical process involves the reduction of zinc compounds to elemental zinc (boiling point 907 °C) which volatilises, which oxidises in the vapour phase to zinc oxide. The zinc oxide is collected from the kiln outlet exhaust by filters/electrostatic precipitators/settling chambers etc.

Kiln size is typically 50 by 3.6 metres (164 by 12 ft) long / internal diameter, with a rotation speed of around 1 rpm. The recovered dust (Waelz oxide) is enriched in zinc oxide and is a feed product for zinc smelters, the zinc reduced by-product is known as Waelz slag. Sub-optimal features of the process are high energy consumption, and lack of iron recovery (and iron rich slag). The process also captures other low boiling metals in the waelz oxide including lead, cadmium and silver. Halogen compounds are also present in the product oxide.

Increased use of galvanised steel has resulted in increased levels of zinc in steel scrap which in turn leads to higher levels of zinc in electric arc furnace flue dusts. As of 2000, the waelz process is considered to be a "best available technology" for flue dust zinc recovery and the process is used at industrial scale worldwide.

As of 2014, the Waelz process is the preferred or most widely used process for zinc recovery of zinc from electric arc furnace dust (90%).
