= Schlangenberg Nature Reserve =

Nature reserve in North Rhine-Westphalia, Germany

- Naturschutzgebiet Schlangenberg
- IUCN category IV (habitat/species management area)
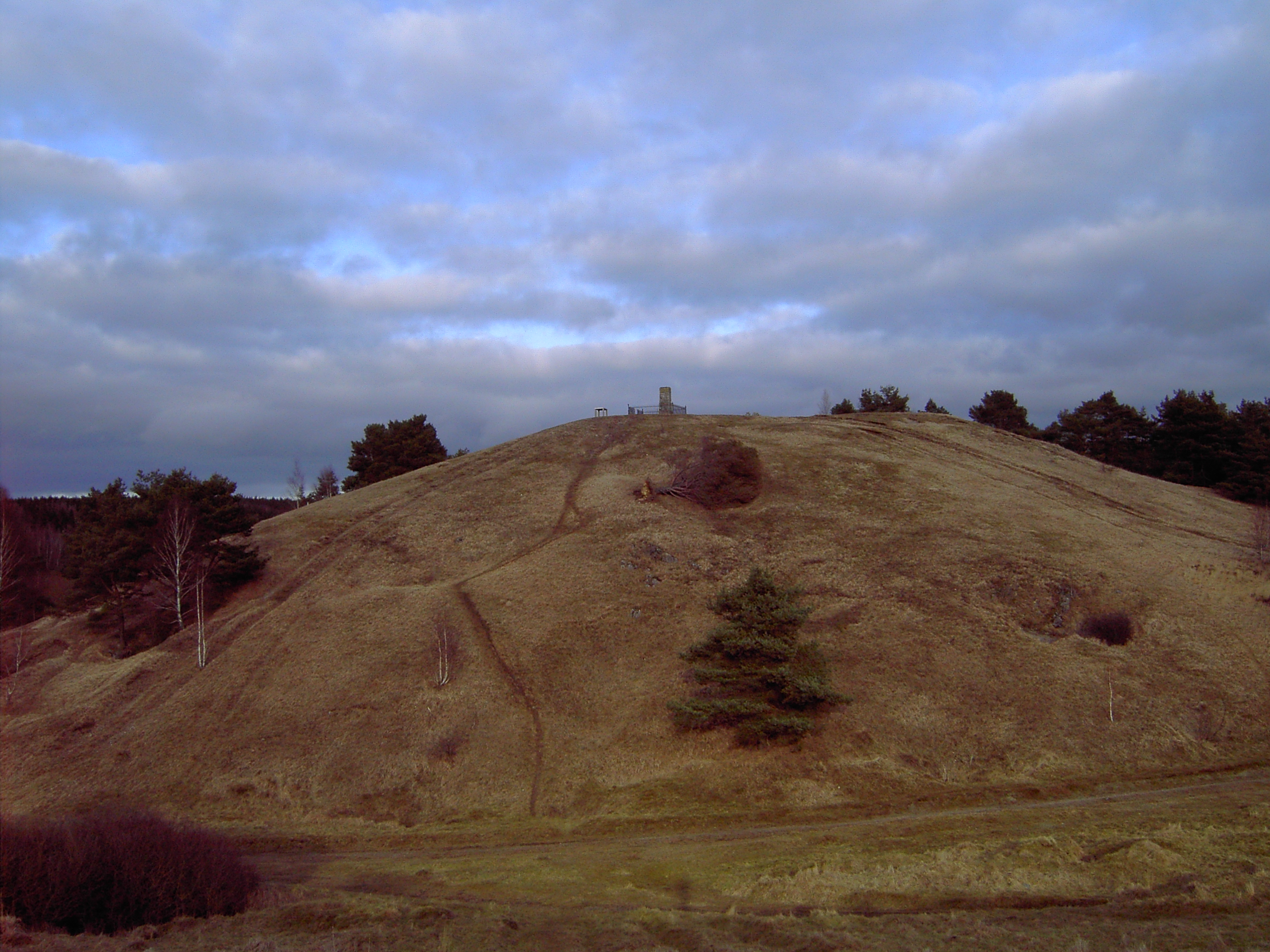
- Schlangenberg in January

- Location within Germany
- Location: Breinigerberg, North Rhine-Westphalia, Germany
- Nearest city: Aachen
- Coordinates: 50°44′14″N 6°14′36″E
- Area: 1.24 km^{2} (0.48 sq mi)
- Established: 2005
- Governing body: NRW-Stiftung

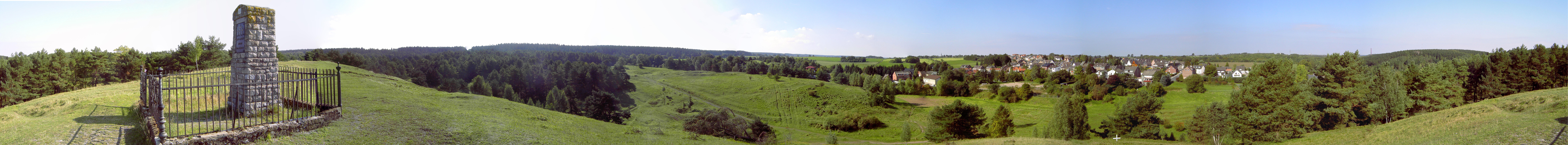
360° View from the Schlangenberg

The nature reserve of Schlangenberg which means snake-mountain is located in the west of Germany close to the Dutch and Belgian border. The reserve is near the village Breinigerberg, 15 kilometres from Aachen or 7 kilometres distant from the city of Stolberg (Rhineland). Schlangenberg itself is a small hill peaking 276 m above sea level.

The 124 hectares (310 acres) large area is famous for its calamine flora.

== Geology ==
The soil of the nature reserve is basically limestone which was precipitated about 400 million years ago by an ancient ocean. In the following million years geological movements carried it to the surface where erosion removed large amounts. About 200 million years ago aqueous metal solutions filled the cavernous rocks. Primary ores were created mostly consisting of Sphalerite, Marcasite and Galena. The process continued and the ore close to the surface decomposed due to the influence of carbon dioxide and water. In this process as a secondary ore calamine ZnCO_{3} which is known as calamine developed.

== History ==
Presumably the Celts had been the first digging for the calamine in the region. Ancient Celtic and Roman coins dated between 100 BC and 92/93 AD as well as remains of a Roman settlement proved the interest in the ore which was mostly used for weapons and vessels.

The greatest interest in calamine had been in the 18th century when brass manufactures settled in Stolberg (Rhineland). For the production of the alloy they needed large amounts of calamine which was melted together with copper.

Before 1800 digging small reaching only surface based ore was the only technique available to the miners. In the 19th century mining changed and more than 20 adits enabled the workers to reach calamine up to 105 m below the surface. During this time the Schlangenberg-area was perforated like a Swiss cheese. More than 700 miners worked at the mining shafts. During this time calamine was spread in the whole area and the poisonous metals zinc and lead contaminated large areas.

In 1871 the Franco-prussian war stopped working on the ore fields and after an attempted restart mining was given up 1883. A renaturation of the Schlangenberg was never attempted. For many years it was even used by the military for their maneuvers.

Nature regained control of the Schlangenberg and in 1990 the Schlangenberg Nature Reserve was founded to protect the unique calamine flora and fauna from destruction.

== Flora ==
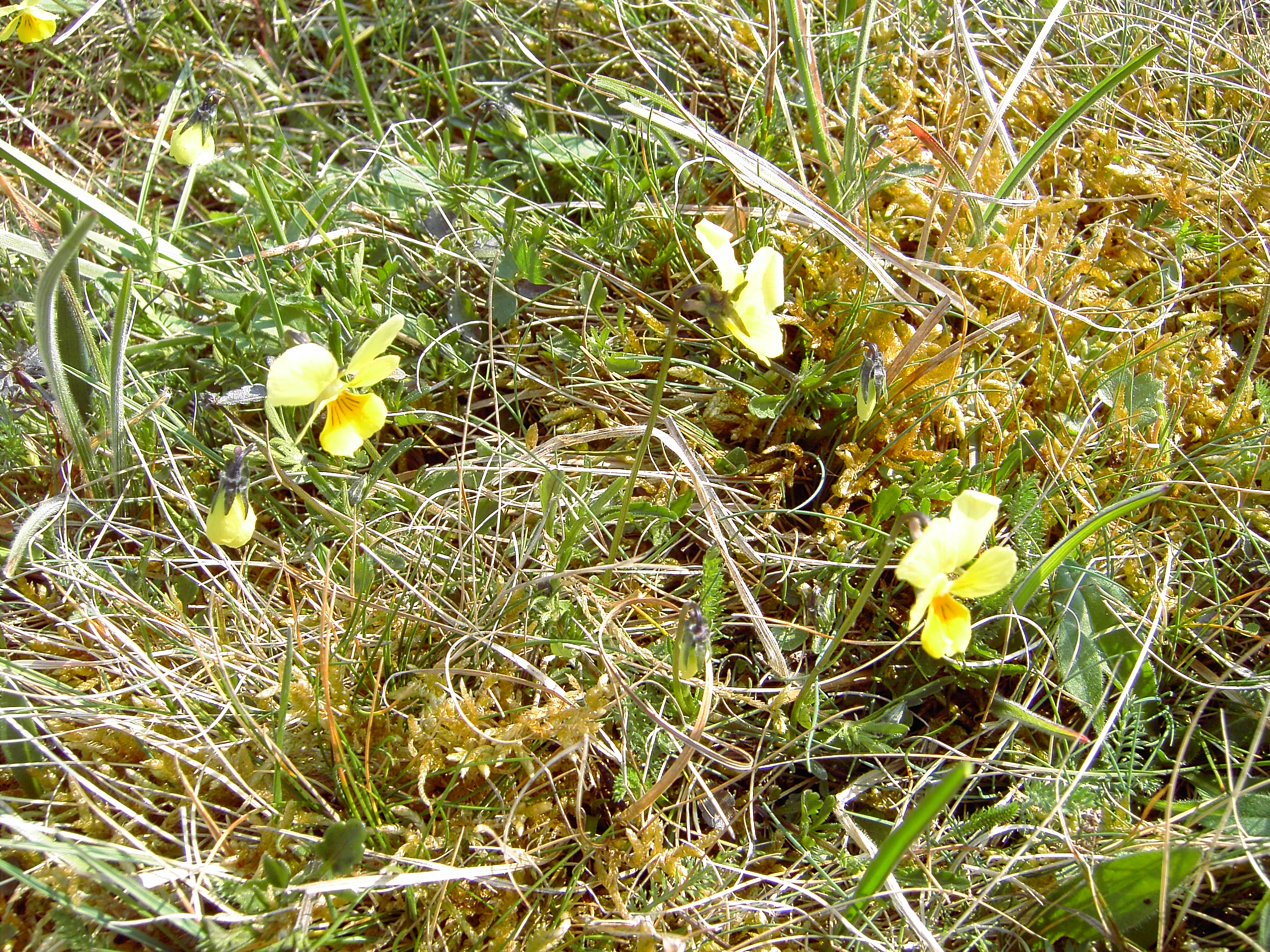
Viola calaminaria

The soil of the nature reserve contains large amounts of calamine, poisonous for most plants. Only specialist plants are able to grow under these conditions. Therefore, the flora is unique to calamine and can only be found in a few other areas worldwide.

The most typical plants are Viola calaminaria and Thlaspi calaminare. Many tourists visit the reserve for these flowers each year.

Beside these plants other specialists found on the toxic floor are: Armeria maritima ssp. elongata, Festuca aquisgranensis, Silene vulgaris ssp. humilis or Minuartia verna ssp. hercynica.

On some hidden parts of the reserve orchids like the dark red helleborine (Epipactis atrorubens) the fly orchid (Ophrys insectifera) and many others grow year by year.

== Fauna ==
The Schlangenberg reserve is famous for its butterflies. More than 300 different kinds have been found there. Some have specialist on calamine resistant plants. Endangered locusts like the wart-biters belong to the important animals.

The Coronella austriaca that give the Schlangenberg its name (snake-mountain) can occasionally be found in the reserve.

The woodlark, an endangered species in Germany, as well as the red-backed shrike live in the reserve in large quantities.

The Biologischen Station im Kreis Aachen e. V. a governmental group of environmental specialists has tried to resettle the yellow-bellied toad.

== Threats to the nature reserve ==
Although the toxic ground prevents most plants from growing in this area, some seem to be resistant to the toxicity. Pines, for example, would destroy most of the nature reserve within a short time, so the Biologischen Station im Kreis Aachen e. V. and accompanying volunteers spend a lot of time cutting pines and reducing their numbers.

Visitors of the nature reserve destroy much of the flora and fauna through the creation and use of hiking trails.

A local group had founded a museum presenting detailed information about the Schlangenberg, its past as a mining area, exhibits of animals and flowers, as well as plenty of photos to visiting tourists.
