= The Gambler (novel) =

1866 novel by Fyodor Dostoyevsky

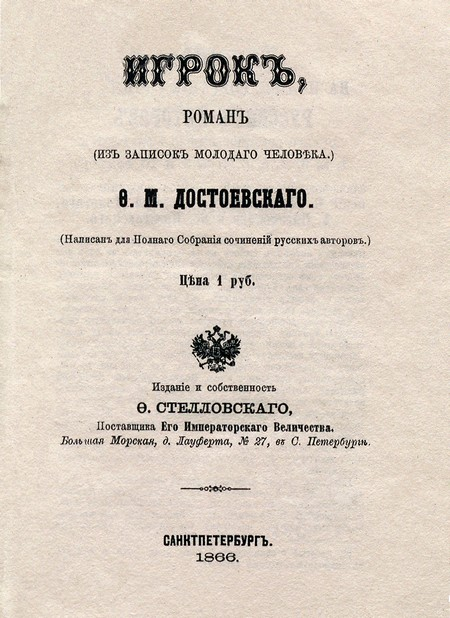
- Title page of first edition. Note the archaic spelling ИГРОКЪ
- Author: Fyodor Dostoevsky
- Original title: Игрокъ (modern spelling without ъ)
- Language: Russian
- Genre: Novel
- Set in: "Roulettenbad", Grand Duchy of Hesse, 1863
- Publisher: Fyodor Stellovsky
- Publication date: 1866
- Publication place: Russian Empire
- English publication date: 1887
- Media type: Print (Hardback & Paperback)
- Pages: 191
- Dewey Decimal: 891.733
- LC Class: PG3326 .I4
- Preceded by: Crime and Punishment
- Followed by: The Idiot
- Text: The Gambler at Wikisource

The Gambler (Russian: Игрокъ, romanized: Igrok; modern spelling Игрок) is a short novel by Fyodor Dostoevsky about a young tutor in the employment of a formerly wealthy Russian general. Set in a hotel and casino in a German city, the theme of gambling reflects Dostoevsky's own experience of addiction to roulette. Dostoevsky completed the novel in 1866 under a strict deadline to pay off gambling debts.

== Background ==
Dostoevsky gambled for the first time at the tables at Wiesbaden in 1863. From that time till 1871, when his passion for gambling subsided, he played at Baden-Baden, Homburg, and Saxon-les-Bains frequently, often beginning by winning a small amount of money and losing far more in the end. He first mentions his interest in gambling in a letter he sent to his first wife's sister on 1 September 1863 describing his initial success:

Please do not think that, in my joy over not having lost, I am showing off by saying that I possess the secret of how to win instead of losing. I really do know the secret — it is terribly silly and simple, merely a matter of keeping oneself under constant control and never getting excited, no matter how the game shifts. That's all there is to it — you just can't lose that way and are sure to win.

Within a week he lost his winnings and was forced to beg his family for money. He wrote to his brother Mikhail on 8 September 1863:

And I believed in my system ... within a quarter of an hour I won 600 francs. This whetted my appetite. Suddenly I started to lose, couldn't control myself and lost everything. After that I ... took my last money, and went to play ... I was carried away by this unusual good fortune and I risked all 35 napoleons and lost them all. I had 6 napoleons d'or left to pay the landlady and for the journey. In Geneva I pawned my watch.

Dostoevsky then agreed to a hazardous contract with F. T. Stellovsky that if he did not deliver a novel of 12 or more signatures by 1 November 1866, Stellovsky would acquire the right to publish Dostoevsky's works for nine years, until 1 November 1875, without any compensation to the writer. He noted down parts of his story, then dictated them to one of the first stenographers in Russia, the 19 year old Anna Grigorevna Snitkina, who transcribed them and copied it neatly out for him. With her help, he was able to finish the book in time. Anna later became his wife.

== Plot summary ==
The first-person narrative is told from the point of view of Alexei Ivanovich, a tutor working for a Russian family living in a suite at a German hotel. The patriarch of the family, The General, is indebted to the Frenchman de Grieux and has mortgaged his property in Russia to pay only a small amount of his debt. Upon learning of the illness of his wealthy aunt, "Grandmother", he sends streams of telegrams to Moscow and awaits the news of her demise. His expected inheritance will pay his debts and gain Mademoiselle Blanche de Cominges's hand in marriage.

Alexei is hopelessly in love with Polina, the General's stepdaughter. She asks him to go to the town's casino and place a bet for her. After hesitations, he succumbs and ends up winning at the roulette table. He returns to her with the winnings, but she will not tell him why she is in such need of money. She laughs at him (as she does when he professes his love) and treats him with apparent indifference. Alexei only learns the details of the General's and Polina's financial state later in the story through his long-time acquaintance, Mr. Astley. Astley is a shy Englishman who seems to share Alexei's fondness for Polina. He comes from English nobility and is very wealthy.

One day, while Polina and Alexei are on a walk on the Schlangenberg (a mountain in the German town), he swears an oath of servitude to her. He tells her that all she has to do is give the word and he will gladly walk off the edge and plummet to his death. Polina dares him to insult the aristocratic couple Baron and Baroness Wurmerhelm, whom they have just seen, and he does so. This sets off a chain of events that explains Mademoiselle Blanche's interest in the General and gets Alexei fired as tutor of the General's children. Shortly after this, Grandmother shows up and surprises the whole party of debtors and indebted. She tells them all that she knows all about the General's debt and why the Frenchman and woman are waiting around the suite day after day. She leaves the party of death-profiteers, telling them that none of them are getting any of her money. She asks Alexei to be her guide around the town, famous for its healing waters and infamous for its casino; she wants to gamble.

Grandmother plays at the roulette table and wins a large amount of money. She briefly returns to the hotel, but she has caught the gambling bug and soon returns to the casino. After three days, she has lost over a hundred thousand roubles.

After sending Grandmother off at the railway station, Alexei returns to his room where he is greeted by Polina. She shows him a letter where des Grieux says he has started legal proceedings to sell the General's properties mortgaged to him, but he is returning properties worth fifty thousand roubles to the General for Polina's benefit. Des Grieux says he feels he has fulfilled all his obligations. Polina tells Alexei that she is des Grieux's mistress and she wishes she had fifty thousand roubles to fling in des Grieux's face. Upon hearing this, Alexei runs out of the room and to the casino where, over a few hours, he wins two hundred thousand florins (100,000 francs) and becomes a rich man. When he gets back to his room and the waiting Polina, he empties the gold and bank notes from his pockets onto the bed. At first Polina accuses him of trying to buy her like des Grieux, but then she embraces him. They fall asleep on the couch. Next day, she asks for fifty thousand roubles (25,000 francs) and when he gives it to her, she flings the money in his face and runs off to Mr. Astley (Polina and Mr. Astley had been secretly meeting; she was supposed to meet Astley the night before, but had come by mistake to Alexei's room). Alexei doesn't see her again.

After learning that the General won't be getting his inheritance, Mademoiselle Blanche leaves for Paris with her mother and seduces Alexei to follow her. They stay together for almost a month; he allows Mlle Blanche to spend his entire fortune on her own personal expenses, carriages and horses, dinner dances, and a wedding-party. After getting herself financially secured, Mlle Blanche, desiring an established social status, unexpectedly marries the General, who has followed her to Paris.

Alexei starts to gamble to survive. One day he passes Mr. Astley on a park bench in Bad Homburg and has a talk with him. He finds out from Astley that Polina is in Switzerland and actually does love Alexei. Astley tells him that Grandmother has died and left Polina and the children financially secured. The General has died in Paris. Astley gives him some money but shows little hope that he will not use it for gambling. Alexei goes home dreaming of going to Switzerland the next day and recollects what made him win at the roulette tables in the past.

== Characters ==
In order of appearance:

Chapter 1

I can't stand this lackeyishness in the gossip columns of the whole world, and mainly in our Russian newspapers: ... first, the extraordinary magnificence and splendor of the gaming rooms in the roulette towns on the Rhine, and second, the heaps of gold that supposedly lie on the tables ... There is no magnificence in these trashy rooms, and as for the gold, not only are there no heaps on the tables, but there's scarcely even the slightest trace.

- Alexei Ivanovich – The narrator of the story; nobleman, wiseacre. Tutor of The General's young children Nadjenka and Misha. Pathologically in love with Polina Alexandrovna: "...two days ago on the Schlangenberg you challenged me, and I whispered: say the word and I'll jump into this abyss. If you had said the word then I would have jumped."
- The General – Sagorjanski, 55, a widower, in love with Mlle Blanche. In thrall to the Marquis Des Grieux since the latter made up a shortfall in public funds that the general had to cover before he could hand over his government post.
- Polina Alexandrovna Praskovja – The General's stepdaughter. Spitefully manipulates the smitten narrator. Cares nothing for gambling.
- Maria Filippovna – The General's sister
- Marquis des Grieux – The "little Frenchman", called "Monsieur le Comte" by the servants. Pompous, holds forth about finance at the dinner table. Deeply concerned that The General receive his inheritance so that des Grieux can be repaid.
- Mr. Astley – Englishman, nephew of Lord Piebrook, serves as a steadying influence on Alexei Ivanovich. "I have never met a shyer man ... very nice and quiet". Far wealthier than des Grieux.

Chapter 3

Why is gambling worse than any other way of making money—trade, for instance?

- Mademoiselle Blanche de Cominges – The General's fiancée, assumed to be a French noblewoman. About 25, "tall and well built, with shapely shoulders ... her hair is black as ink, and there is a terrible amount of it, enough for two coiffures ... She dresses showily, richly, with chic, but with great taste". Returns the attentions of The General only insofar as she is interested in his prospective inheritance.

Chapter 6

...is it really not clear yet which is more vile—Russian outrageousness or the German way of accumulation through honest work?

- Baroness Wurmerhelm – "...short and extraordinarily fat, with a terribly fat, pendulous chin, so that her neck couldn't be seen at all. A purple face. Small eyes, wicked and insolent. She walks along as if she's doing everyone an honor."
- Baron Wurmerhelm – "...dry, tall. His face, as German faces usually are, is crooked and covered with a thousand tiny wrinkles; eyeglasses; forty-five years old ... Proud as a peacock. A bit clumsy".

Chapter 9

Des Grieux was like all Frenchmen, that is, cheerful and amiable when it was necessary and profitable, and insufferably dull when the necessity to be cheerful and amiable ceased. A Frenchman is rarely amiable by nature; he is always amiable as if on command, out of calculation.

- Antonida Vasilevna Tarasevitcheva – The General's aunt, called la baboulinka (The Grandmother). "...formidable and rich, seventy-five years old ... a landowner and a Moscow grande dame ... perky, self-satisfied, straight-backed, shouting loudly and commandingly, scolding everybody..." Takes an instant liking to roulette, with disastrous consequences.
- Potapyts – The Grandmother's butler
- Marfa – The Grandmother's maid, "a forty-year-old maiden, red-cheeked but already beginning to go gray..."
- Madame de Cominges (no dialog) – Assumed to be Mlle Blanche's mother; called "Madame la Comtesse" by the servants.
- The Little Prince (no dialog) – Companion to Mlle Blanche when it appears there may be some trouble with The General's inheritance.
- Fedosja (no dialog) – General's nanny
- Prince Nilski (no dialog)

Chapter 15

- Albert (no dialog) – Army officer in Paris, Mlle Blanche's lover

== English translations ==
- Fred Whishaw
- C. J. Hogarth
- Constance Garnett
- Ivy Litvinov
- Jessie Coulson
- Jane Kentish
- Richard Pevear and Larissa Volokhonsky
- Hugh Aplin
- Ronald Meyer

== Adaptations ==
Everyman Library edition of The Gambler

The novel was the basis of a 1929 opera by Sergei Prokofiev, The Gambler.

Several films have been inspired by the book. The Great Sinner, a loose adaptation, starred Gregory Peck and Ava Gardner under the direction of Robert Siodmak in 1949. Le joueur, a 1958 French film adaptation by Claude Autant-Lara, starred by Gérard Philipe. A 1972 co-production of the USSR and Czechoslovakia by Lenfilm studio and Barrandov Studios, directed by Alexei Batalov, follows the book closely.

There are two movies based on Dostoevsky's life during the time when he was writing the novel. The 1981 Soviet film, Twenty Six Days from the Life of Dostoyevsky and the Hungarian director Károly Makk's 1997 film The Gambler.

A TV mini-series was broadcast on BBC in 1969, and rebroadcast by Masterpiece Theatre in the US.

The novel was the basis for the 2010 French comic book Le Joueur by Stéphane Miquel and Loïc Godart.

A radio play version was aired by BBC Radio 4 in December 2010, written by Glyn Maxwell and directed by Guy Retallack.

A two-part modern-day adaptation, written by Dolya Gavanski (who also played "Polina") and entitled The Russian Gambler, was broadcast on BBC Radio 4 as part of its Classic Serial series in November 2013 and re-broadcast on BBC Radio 4 Extra in March 2018. The cast also included Ed Stoppard as Alexei.
