= James Smithson =

British chemist and mineralogist (c. 1765–1829)

James Smithson FRS
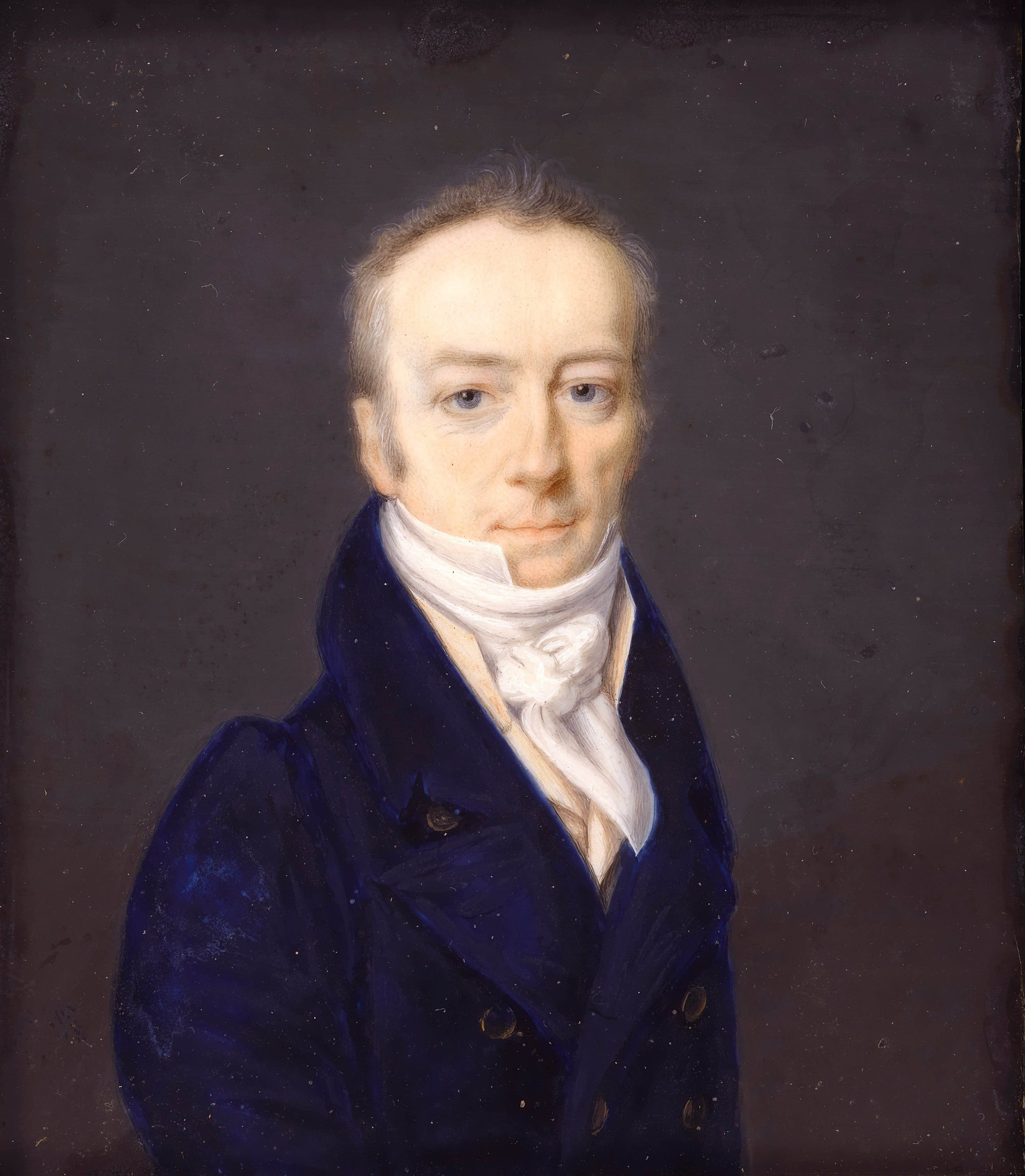
- James Smithson by Henri-Joseph Johns, 1816
- Born: Jacques-Louis Macie c. 1765; Paris, Kingdom of France
- Died: 27 June 1829 (aged 63–64); Genoa, Kingdom of Sardinia
- Burial place: Smithsonian Castle, Washington, D.C.
- Education: Pembroke College, Oxford
- Occupations: Chemist, mineralogist
- Known for: Founding donor of the Smithsonian Institution

James Smithson (c. 1765 – 27 June 1829) was a British chemist and mineralogist. He published numerous scientific papers for the Royal Society during the early 1800s as well as defining calamine, which would eventually be renamed after him as "smithsonite". He was the founding donor of the Smithsonian Institution, which also bears his name.

Born in Paris, France, as the illegitimate child of Elizabeth Hungerford Keate Macie and Hugh Percy (born Hugh Smithson), the 1st Duke of Northumberland, he was given the French name Jacques-Louis Macie. His birth date was not recorded and the exact location of his birth is unknown; it is possibly in the Pentemont Abbey. Shortly after his birth, he naturalised in Britain, where his name was anglicised to James Louis Macie. He adopted his father's original surname of Smithson in 1800, following his mother's death. He attended university at Pembroke College, Oxford, in 1782, eventually graduating with a Master of Arts in 1786. As a student he participated in a geological expedition to Scotland and studied chemistry and mineralogy. Highly regarded for his blowpipe analysis and his ability to work in miniature, Smithson spent much of his life traveling extensively throughout Europe; he published some 27 papers in his life.

Smithson never married and had no children; therefore, when he wrote his will, he left his estate to his nephew, or his nephew's family if his nephew died before Smithson. If his nephew were to die without heirs, however, Smithson's will stipulated that his estate be used "to found in Washington, under the name of the Smithsonian Institution, an establishment for the increase and diffusion of knowledge among men". He died in Genoa, Italy, on 27 June 1829, aged 64. Six years later, in 1835, his nephew died without heir, setting in motion the bequest to the United States. In this way Smithson became the patron of the Smithsonian Institution in Washington, D.C., despite having never visited the United States.

== Early life ==
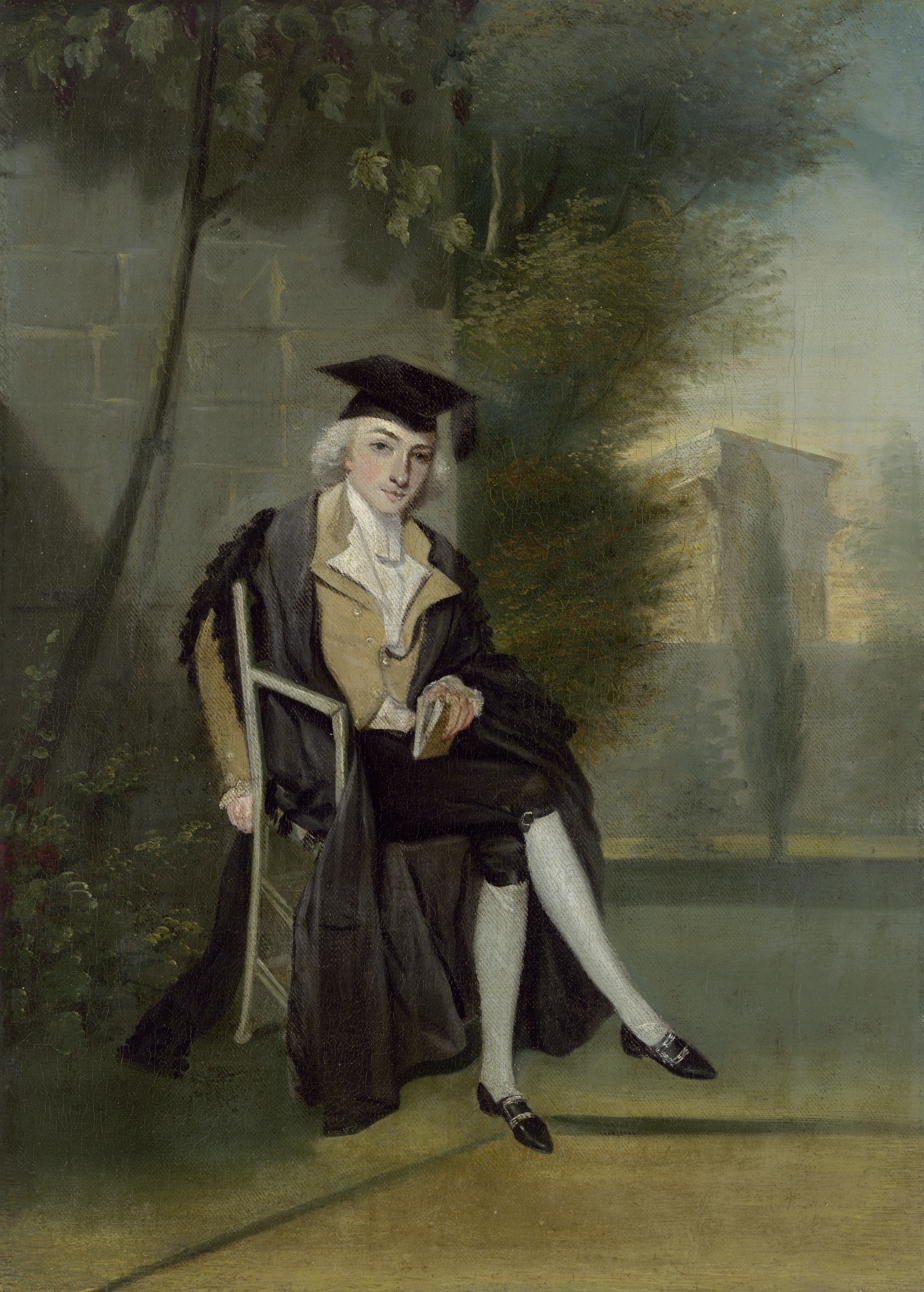
A young James Louis Macie, dressed in Oxford regalia, by James Roberts, c. 1786

James Smithson was born in c. 1765 to Hugh Percy, 1st Duke of Northumberland and Elizabeth Hungerford Keate Macie. His mother was the widow of John Macie, a wealthy man from Weston, Bath. An illegitimate child, Smithson was born in secret in Paris, resulting in his birth name being the Francophone Jacques-Louis Macie (later altered to James Louis Macie). In 1801 when he was about 36, after the death of his again-widowed mother, he changed his last name to Smithson, the original surname of his biological father. (Sir Hugh Smithson, 4th Baronet, had changed his surname to Percy in 1749 upon inheriting, by special remainder, the Earldom of Northumberland, from his father-in-law, the Duke of Somerset. Sir Hugh, in 1740 married Lady Elizabeth Seymour (later suo jure Baroness Percy), an heiress of the Percy family, one of the leading landowning families of Britain. He was later created Duke of Northumberland in 1766.).

James was educated and eventually naturalised in England. He enrolled at Pembroke College, Oxford in 1782 and graduated in 1786 with an MA. The poet George Keate was a first cousin once removed, on his mother's side.

Smithson was nomadic in his lifestyle, travelling throughout Europe. As a student, in 1784, he participated in a geological expedition with Barthélemy Faujas de Saint-Fond, William Thornton and Paolo Andreani to Scotland and especially the Hebrides. He was in Paris during the French Revolution. In August 1807 Smithson became a prisoner of war while in Tönning during the Napoleonic Wars. He arranged a transfer to Hamburg, where he was again imprisoned, now by the French. The following year, Smithson wrote to Sir Joseph Banks and asked him to use his influence to gain release; Banks succeeded and Smithson returned to England. He never married or had children.

In 1766, his mother had inherited from the Hungerford family of Studley, where her brother had lived up until his death. His controversial legal step-father John Marshe Dickinson (aka Dickenson) of Dunstable died in 1771. Smithson's wealth stemmed from the splitting of his mother's estate with his half-brother, Col. Henry Louis Dickenson.

== Scientific work ==
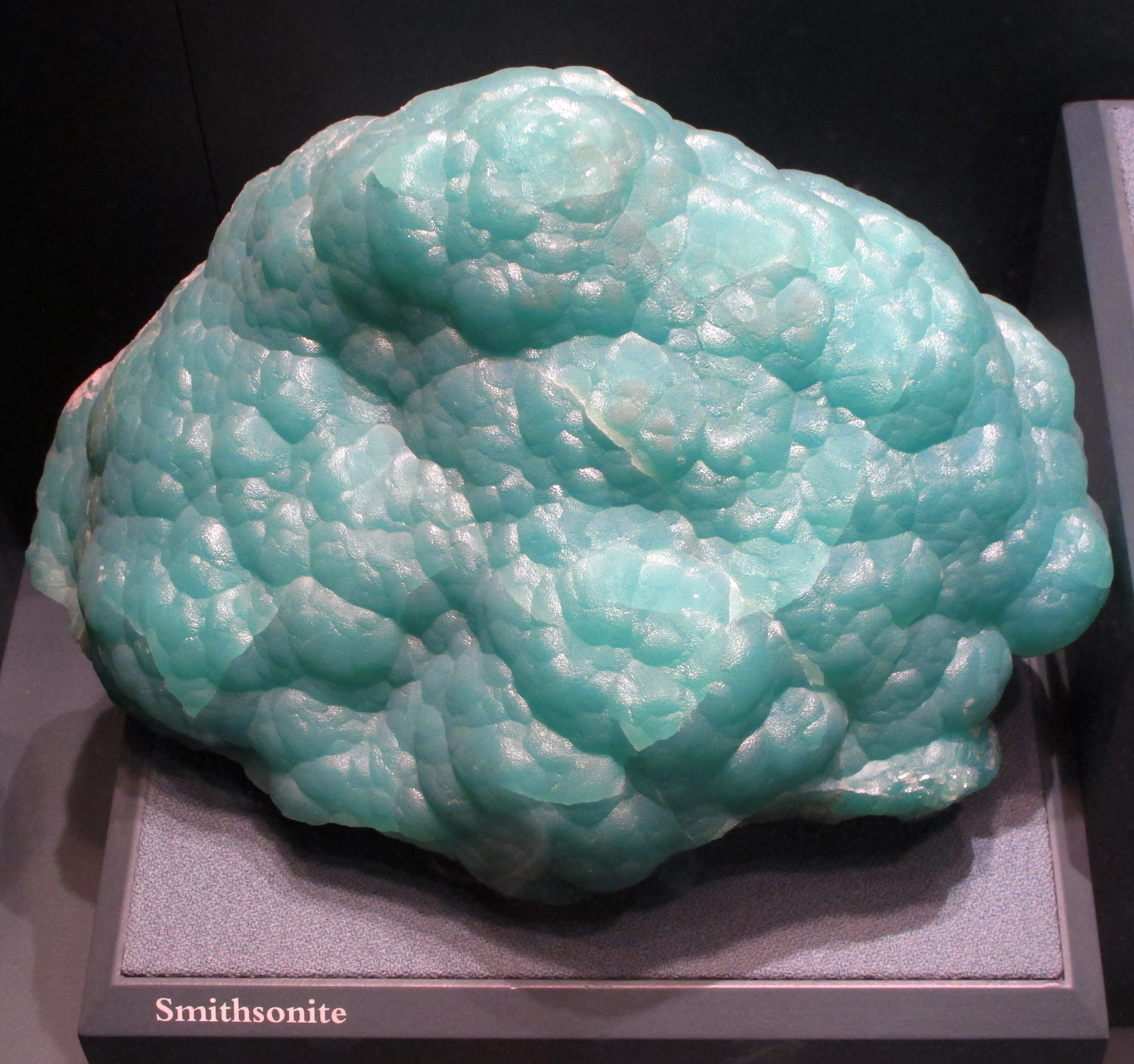
Smithsonite, which was named after Smithson

Smithson's research work was eclectic. He studied subjects ranging from coffee making to the use of calamine, eventually renamed smithsonite, in making brass. He also studied the chemistry of human tears, snake venom and other natural occurrences. Smithson published twenty-seven papers. He was nominated to the Royal Society of London by Henry Cavendish and was made a fellow on 26 April 1787. Smithson socialised and worked with scientists Joseph Priestley, Sir Joseph Banks, Antoine Lavoisier, and Richard Kirwan.

His first paper was presented at the Royal Society on 7 July 1791, "An Account of Some Chemical Experiments on Tabasheer". Tabasheer is a substance used in traditional Indian medicine and derived from material collected inside bamboo culms. The samples that Macie analysed had been sent by Patrick Russell, physician-naturalist in India.

In 1802 he read his second paper, "A Chemical Analysis of Some Calamines," at the Royal Society. It was published in the Philosophical Transactions of the Royal Society of London and was the documented instance of his new name, James Smithson. In the paper, Smithson challenges the idea that the mineral calamine is an oxide of zinc. His discoveries made calamine a "true mineral".

He explored and examined Kirkdale Cave; his findings, published in 1824, successfully challenged previous beliefs that the fossils within the formations at the cave were from the Great Flood.

Smithson is credited with first using the word "silicates"; Smithson's bank records at C. Hoare & Co show extensive and regular income derived from Apsley Pellatt, which suggests that Smithson had a strong financial or scientific relationship with the Blackfriars glass maker.

== Later life and death ==
Smithson died in Genoa, Italy on 27 June 1829. He was buried in a Protestant cemetery overlooking Sampierdarena. In his will written in 1826, Smithson left his fortune to the son of his brother – that is, his nephew, Henry James Dickenson. Dickenson had to change his surname to Hungerford as a condition of receiving the inheritance. In the will Smithson stated that Henry James Hungerford, or Hungerford's children, would receive his inheritance, and that if his nephew did not live, and had no children to receive the fortune, it would be donated to the United States to establish an educational institution to be called the Smithsonian Institution.

Henry Hungerford died on 5 June 1835, unmarried and leaving behind no children, and the United States was the recipient. In his will, Smithson explained the Smithsonian mission:

I then bequeath the whole of my property, . . . to the United States of America, to found at Washington, under the name of the Smithsonian Institution, an Establishment for the increase & diffusion of knowledge among men.

== Legacy and the Smithsonian ==
Later in the year of his death the United States government was informed about the bequest when Aaron Vail wrote to Secretary of State John Forsyth. This information was then passed onto President Andrew Jackson who then informed Congress; a committee was organized, and after much debate the Smithsonian Institution was established by legislation. In 1836 President Jackson sent Richard Rush, former Treasury Secretary, to England as Commissioner to proceed in Chancery Court to secure the funds. In 1838 he was successful and returned, accompanied by 104,960 gold sovereigns (in eleven crates) and Smithson's personal items, scientific notes, minerals, and library. The gold was transferred to the treasury in Philadelphia and was reminted into $508,318.46 (equivalent to $15,369,000 in 2025). The final funds from Smithson were received in 1864 from Marie de la Batut, Smithson's nephew's mother. This final amount totalled $54,165.38

On 24 February 1847 the Board of Regents, which oversaw the creation of the Smithsonian, approved the seal for the institution. The seal, based on an engraving by Pierre Joseph Tiolier, was manufactured by Edward Stabler and designed by Robert Dale Owen. Although Smithson's papers and collection of minerals were destroyed in a fire in 1865, his collection of 213 books remains intact at the Smithsonian. The Board of Regents acquired a portrait of Smithson dressed in Oxford University student attire, painted by James Roberts, that is now on display in the crypt at the Smithsonian Castle. An additional portrait, a miniature, and the original draft of Smithson's will were acquired in 1877; they now reside in the National Portrait Gallery and Smithsonian Institution Archives, respectively. Additional items were acquired from Smithson's relatives in 1878.

The circumstances of his birth seem to have created in him a desire for posthumous fame, although he had established quite a reputation in the scientific community and lived proud of his descent. Smithson once wrote:

The best blood of England flows in my veins. On my father's side I am a Northumberland, on my mother's I am related to kings; but this avails me not. My name shall live in the memory of man when the titles of the Northumberlands and the Percys are extinct and forgotten.

=== Relocation of Smithson's remains to Washington ===
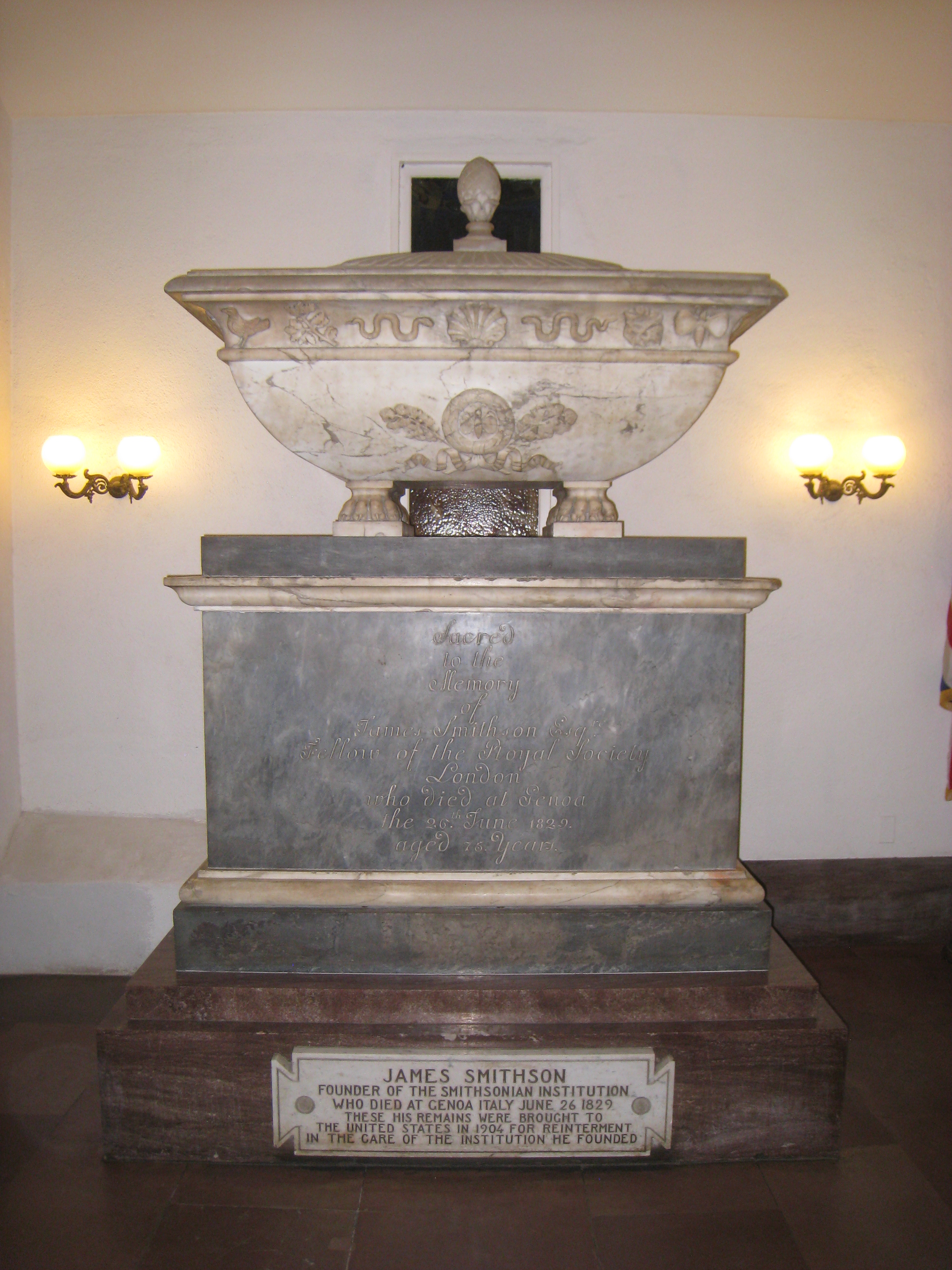
Smithson's crypt in Washington

Smithson was buried in Sampierdarena, Genoa, Italy. The United States consul in Genoa was asked to maintain the grave site, with sponsorship for its maintenance coming from the Smithsonian Institution. Smithsonian Secretary Samuel P. Langley visited the site, contributing further money to maintain it and requested a plaque be designed for the grave site. Three plaques were created by William Ordway Partridge. One was placed at the grave site, a second at a Protestant chapel in Genoa, and the last was gifted to Pembroke College, Oxford. Only one of the plaques exists today. The plaque at the grave site was stolen and then replaced with a marble version. During World War II, the Protestant chapel was destroyed and the plaque was looted. A copy was eventually placed at the site in 1963.

The cemetery where Smithson rested was going to be moved in 1905, for the expansion of an adjacent quarry. In response, Alexander Graham Bell, then a regent of the Smithsonian, proposed that Smithson's remains be moved to the Smithsonian Institution Building; in 1903, he and his wife, Mabel Gardiner Hubbard, traveled to Genoa to exhume the body. A steamship departed Genoa on 7 January 1904 with the remains and arrived in Hoboken, New Jersey on 20 January, where they were transferred to the USS Dolphin (PG-24) for the trip to Washington.

On 25 January a ceremony was held in Washington, D.C., and the body was escorted by the United States Cavalry to the Castle. When handing over the remains to the Smithsonian, Bell stated: "And now... my mission is ended and I deliver into your hands ... the remains of this great benefactor of the United States.” The coffin then lay in state in the Board of Regents' room, where objects from Smithson's personal collection were on display.

=== Memorial ===
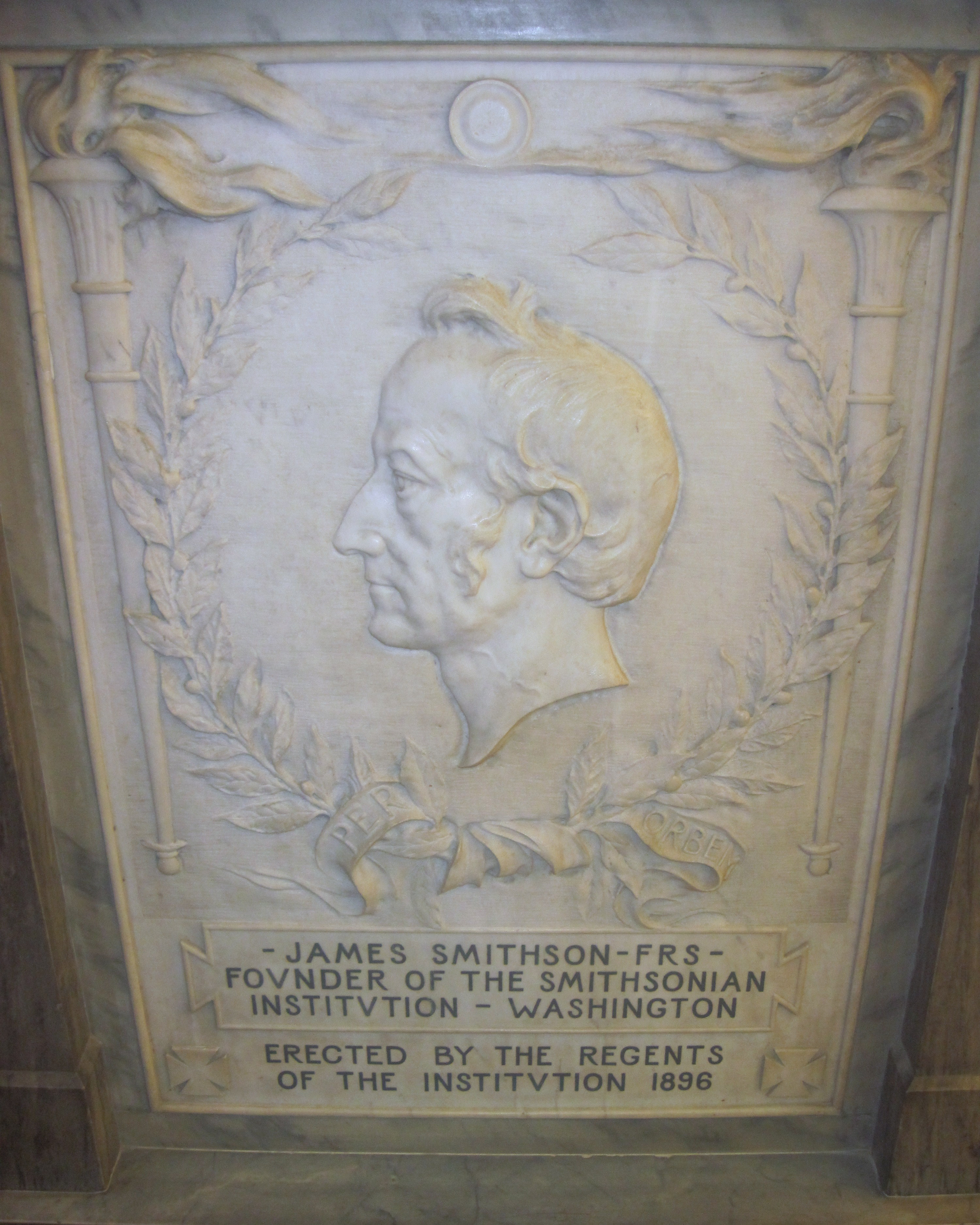
Smithson's gravestone in the Smithsonian Institution Castle

After the arrival of Smithson's remains, the Board of Regents asked Congress to fund a memorial. Artists and architects were solicited to create proposals for the monument. Augustus Saint-Gaudens, Louis Saint-Gaudens, Gutzon Borglum, Totten & Rogers, Henry Bacon, and Hornblower & Marshall were some of the many artists and architectural firms who submitted proposals. The proposals varied in design, from elaborate monumental tombs that, if built, would have been bigger than the Lincoln Memorial, to smaller monuments just outside the Smithsonian Castle. Congress decided not to fund the memorial. To accommodate the fact that the Smithsonian would have to fund the memorial, they used the design of Gutzon Borglum, which suggested a remodel of the south tower room of the Smithsonian Castle to house the memorial surrounded by four Corinthian columns and a vaulted ceiling. Instead of the tower room, a smaller room (at the time it was the janitor's closet) at the north entrance would house an Italian-style sarcophagus.

On 8 December 1904 the Italian crypt was shipped, in sixteen crates from Italy. It travelled on the same ship that the remains of Smithson had travelled on. Architecture firm Hornblower & Marshall designed the mortuary chapel, which included marble laurel wreaths and a neo-classical design. Smithson was entombed on 6 March 1905. His casket, which had been held in the Regent's Room, was placed into the ground underneath the crypt. This chapel was to serve as a temporary space for Smithson's remains until Congress approved a larger memorial. However, that never happened, and the remains of Smithson still lie there today.
