= Letsoku =

Clay-like soil used in Southern Africa

Letsoku is a clay-like soil used by several tribes in Southern Africa and other parts of the African continent.The Sotho-Tswana of Southern Africa have described a number of clay soils as letsoku. These are named differently by other tribes in the region, it is known as chomane in Shona, ilibovu in Swati, imbola in Xhosa and luvhundi in Venda, there are many other names given by other ethnic groups. Letsoku occurs naturally in a number of colours and it has many use, it is mostly used for cosmetic applications in Southern Africa. However, other functions of it is related to artwork, medicinal use, cultural symbolism and traditional beliefs

== Letsoku nature and processing ==
Letsoku is a native earth coloured with hydrated iron oxide, it varies in colour from pale yellow to deep red, brown and from off-white to black, with some having a light grey colour. Letsoku occurs in two distinctive kinds; one has a clayey basis while the other is chalky earth. The former generally is richer and purer in colour than the other. both variations occur naturally in stratified rocks and rubble and rarely as extensive deposits. Letsoku can artificially be prepared through calcination and can be transformed into other colours like mars orange, violet and red.

Letsoku has been described as a substance that never solidifies or as a soft stone. The raw letsoku chunks are crushed with traditional pestle and mortar, it is also grinded on top of a stone with another stone called tshilo in Sotho-Tswana. Sieving is done thereafter to yield a fine powder. Some letsoku users heat the dry raw chunks in an empty pot to disintegrate it into fine powder.

== Letsoku applications/uses ==
=== Cosmetics ===
In cosmetics, each colour is associated with a specific function. Yellow letsoku is used as a face powder to enhance complexion. Red is mixed with water and used as a mask and face wash. It is believed to remove pimples and blemishes, reddish pink and orange is used as a face powder just like the yellow one. White is for general body cleansing and hygiene, as it removes body and mouth odour. Maroon removes dark patches around the eyes( known as "ditshubaba" in Setswana). Purple/violet is for anti-aging, it is mixed with Vaseline and applied around the problem areas to eliminate wrinkles. The moisturizing properties of letsoku mixed with Vaseline is believed to have a sunscreen effect, women working outdoor on the farm apply it to protect the skin against harmful effects of the sun. The practice is believed to also make the skin soft and supple.

Application of letsoku is also believed to lighten the skin and remove any dark marks, or blemishes.The clay soil has been used as a pressed powder or foundation to produce a matte effect. Skin peeling has been known to be treated with a mixture of letsoku fine powder and makhura (butter) or petroleum jelly. Its application to hair has been known to promote hair growth.

=== Cultural symbolism ===
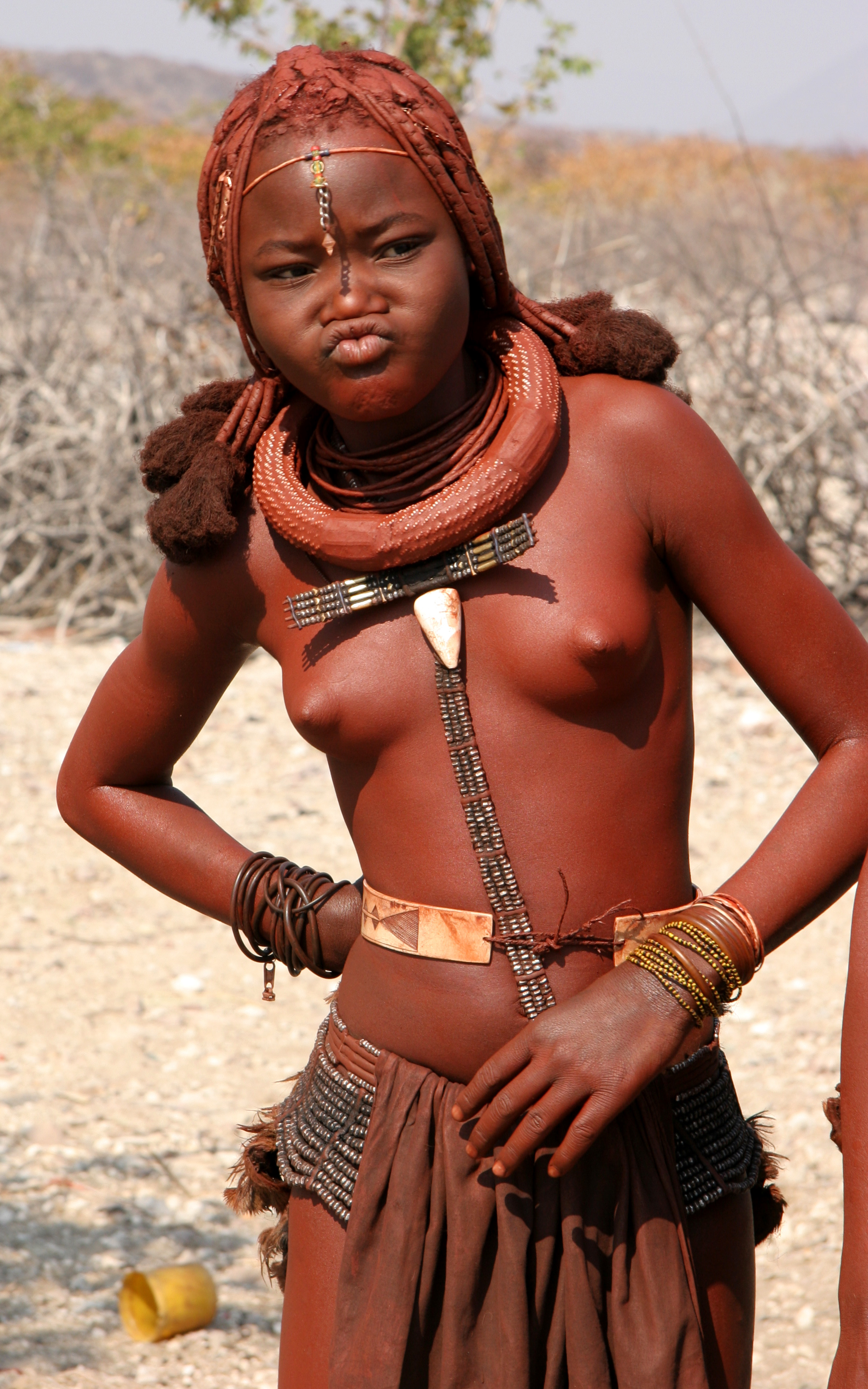
Himba girl adorned with red letsoku

Letsoku in Southern Africa has been used to mark important stages of human life growth, like puberty, marriage and graduation from initiation schools in setswana known as bojale and bogwera. In some parts of Botswana, the ethnic groups still use letsoku to cover bodies of the initiates.Their caretakers help shave their heads and cover their bodies with red or maroon. It is believed that letsoku keeps initiates warm at the circumcision school. The girls are covered enough to ward off winter colds. In the past young girls used to wear fringed skirts (makgabe) with letsoku used to cover each stand of the fringe skirt.The Basotho have a leather apron called semola which is made for young women when they are received from the initiation school. The apron is decorated with red letsoku, which signifies womanhood. Other traditional celebrations like welcoming the bride into a new family are marked by the application of letsoku. In the culture of the San people, during the girls' puberty rituals, a young girl is isolated in her hut at her first menstruation. The women of the tribe perform a dance of the Eland Bull where they imitate the mating behaviour of eland cows, the girl is said to be suffering from the 'eland illness', in her seclusion she is ritually painted with red letsoku, wood ash and charcoal, all mixed with animal fat and plant pigments. As part of the marriage ritual a man gives the fat from the eland's heart to the parents of the girl, at a later stage the girl is anointed with the fat mixed with red letsoku as a way to mark her as a married woman.

The Namibian Himba women are known for the red letsoku that they apply on their whole bodies as a symbol of womanhood, the red letsoku is only applied by married women and young woman who just started their menstruation. They are constantly adorned with red ochre/letsoku made into a paste of a mixture of butter, fat, and red letsoku, known as otjize. The paste is applied to skin and hair.

=== Medicinal applications ===
In addition to symbolic uses, there is some evidence that letsoku had practical functions, for instance letsoku has been shown to have medicinal purposes as an antibacterial agent. It is also used for the treatment of chicken pox, protection against lighting and witchcraft, luck and ritual cleansing. In chicken pox treatment, an aqueous mixture of letsoku is used in a manner similar to calamine lotion. Burns may also be healed by applying the dry powder directly to the blisters allowing contact until it has dried up, it is also used to treat wounds, ulcers and rashes. Similarly the Australian Aboriginal people use ochre/letsoku to treat wounds and sores by covering a wound with chewed red ochre and then with leaves. Aqueous ochre is used in any sores on any part of the body and even for internal body pains;here the patient is covered in ochre and placed in the midday sun to provoke sweating thereby healing the person. Excessive menopausal bleeding was believed to be remedied or managed by the application of letsoku. An aqueous mixture of red and lighter yellow coloured letsoku is prepared and ingested orally, pregnant women who experience pica (abnormal food cravings) may be relieved by oral ingestion of letsoku.

=== Traditional beliefs ===
Crops in the field are believed to be protected using letsoku, some farmers mix their seeds with the red or maroon letsoku in the ritual in Sotho-Tswana community known as "go gotlha dipeo"(to rub the seeds). This is meant to protect the seeds, chase away evil spirits and keep hailstorms from damaging the plants. Farmers rub seeds scrupulously, using both hands, before planting as a form of nurturing the fields in advance. Crops are treated just like infants going through stages of being born, treating the umbilical cord, shaving and smearing the head for protection, others believe use of letsoku links the new born with ancestors. It is also believed that application of letsoku repels dangerous elements such as snakes and lions, and thereby acts as camouflage for the hunters in the forest.

=== Artwork ===
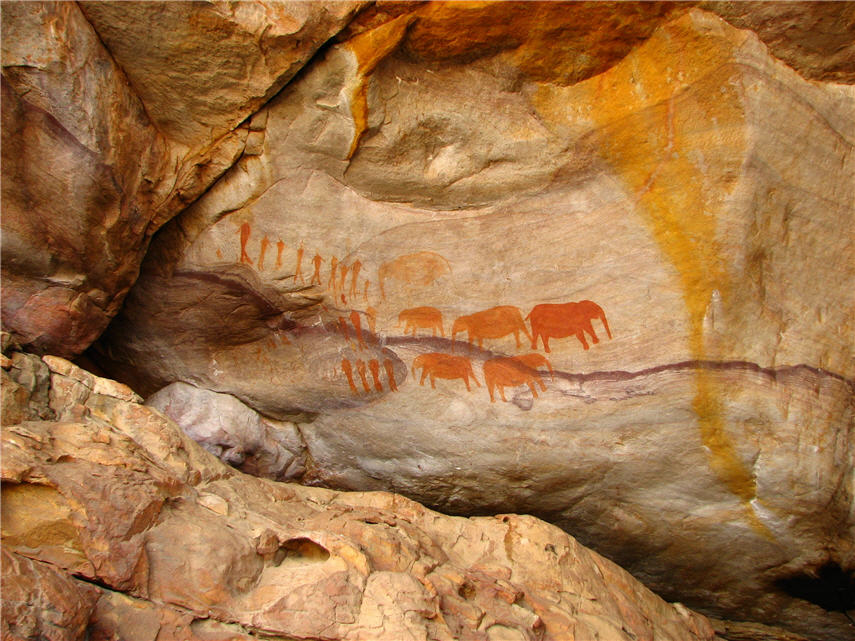
letsoku rock paintings by the san people at South Africa

Potters use letsoku to enhance the colour of the finished pot. During the final stage of polishing a pot with a fine stone, letsoku is added for adornment. As an antibacterial agent, it has been shown that letsoku inhibits collagenase, making it ideal for tanning, softening and colouring leather. Sotho-Tswana tanners use either motsitsima (a herb) or letsoku as a pigment to paint leather skins a bright red colour, especially skin that is used for clothing and shoes. The San of Southern Africa have also used letsoku in the rock paintings found in Kwa-zulu Natal, Eastern and Western Cape provinces (South Africa) and Tsodilo hills in Botswana. They mainly used red, ranging from orange to brown, white, black and yellow in their paintings. The red and yellow colours were derived from letsoku, the blood of an Eland, an animal of great religious and symbolic significance, was mixed with letsoku to make pigmentation for the art paintings. Basotho have the mural tradition called Litema, which refers to four mural techniques; engraved patterns, created by drawing into wet plaster. Painted designs formally consisted of natural ochres (letsoku) and pigments.
