= Zinc silicate =

Zinc silicate may refer to:

- Hemimorphite, a zinc sorosilicate, Zn_{4}(Si_{2}O_{7})(OH)_{2}·H_{2}O
- Willemite, a zinc nesosilicate, Zn_{2}SiO_{4}
- Sauconite, a zinc phyllosilicate, Na_{0.3}Zn_{3}(SiAl)_{4}O_{10}(OH)_{2}·4H_{2}O
