= Calamine =

Cream or lotion for treating skin conditions

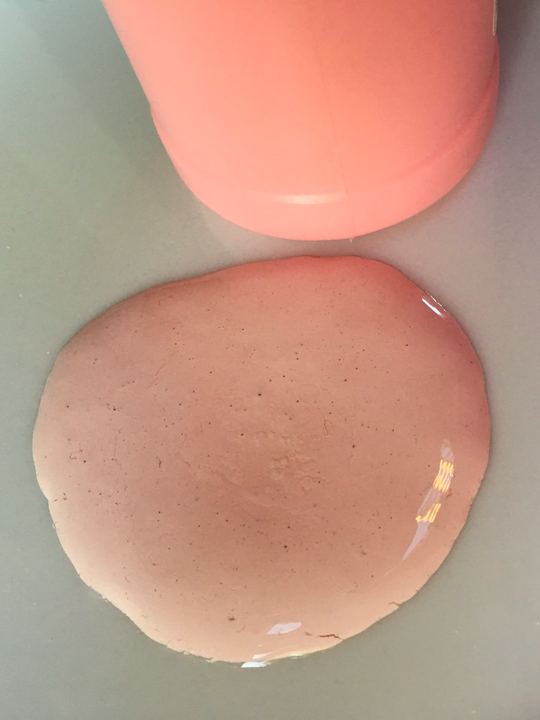
- A puddle of calamine lotion next to a pink plastic bottle

Combination of
- zinc oxide: astringent
- ferric oxide: antipruritic

Clinical data
- Pronunciation: KAL-ə-mine
- Other names: Calamine lotion
- License data: US DailyMed: Calamine
- Routes of administration: Topical
- ATC code: D02AB (WHO)

Legal status
- Legal status: US: OTC

Identifiers
- CAS Number: 8011-96-9
- PubChem CID: 23083748
- ChemSpider: 16112062
- KEGG: D03284
- ChEMBL: ChEMBL3989426

Chemical and physical data
- 3D model (JSmol): Interactive image
- SMILES: [O-2].[O-2].[O-2].[O-2].[Fe+3].[Fe+3].[Zn+2]
- InChI: InChI=1S/2Fe.4O.Zn/q2*+3;4*-2;+2; Key:CPYIZQLXMGRKSW-UHFFFAOYSA-N

Calamine, also known as calamine lotion, is a medication made from a combination of powdered zinc oxide and 0.5% ferric oxide (Fe_{2}O_{3}) that is used to treat mild itching. It benefits sunburn, insect bites, allergenic irritation, and other mild skin conditions, and may also help dry out secretions resulting from skin irritation. Calamine has also been used as a treatment for acne and acne scars, although it may damage the barrier of sensitive skin. Its name comes from calamine, a historic name for the zinc ores smithsonite and hemimorphite.

Calamine is applied to the skin as a cream or lotion. The lotion has been in use since 1500 BC and is now produced with additional ingredients such as phenol and calcium hydroxide.

Calamine is on the World Health Organization's List of Essential Medicines. It is sold over the counter as a generic medication. Side effects may include skin irritation. It is considered to be safe in pregnancy.

== Medical uses ==
Calamine is used to treat itch, as from sunburn, insect bite, poison ivy, poison oak, and other skin irritants. The FDA recommends applying topical over-the-counter skin products such as calamine to absorb skin weeping caused by poisonous plants such as poison ivy, poison oak, and poison sumac, although the FDA advises a cold water compress and topical corticosteroids to treat pain and itch they cause.
