= Hemimorphite =

Silicate mineral

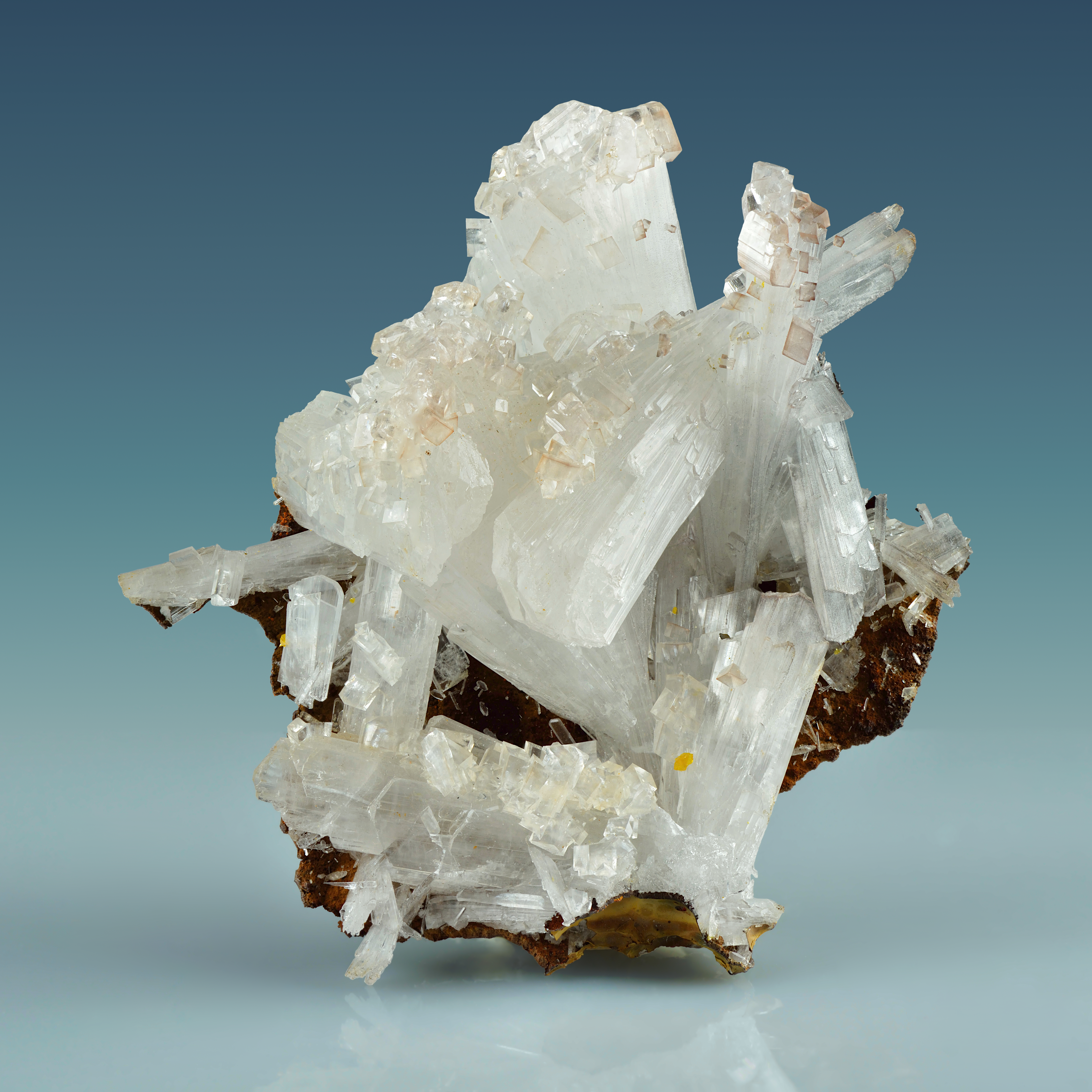

General
- Category: Sorosilicates
- Formula: Zn_{4}Si_{2}O_{7}(OH)_{2}·H_{2}O
- IMA symbol: Hmp
- Strunz classification: 9.BD.10
- Crystal system: Orthorhombic
- Crystal class: Pyramidal (mm2); H-M symbol: (mm2)
- Space group: Imm2
- Unit cell: a = 8.367(5), b = 10.73 c = 5.155(3) [Å]; Z = 2

Identification
- Colour: White, grey, blue
- Crystal habit: Polar crystals, with different or hemimorphic ends. Also coxcomb masses, mammillary, stalactitic, or massive
- Twinning: Rare on {001}
- Cleavage: Perfect on {110}, poor on {101}, {001} rare
- Fracture: Uneven to conchoidal
- Tenacity: Brittle
- Mohs scale hardness: 4.5–5
- Luster: Vitreous, adamantine, rarely silky
- Streak: White
- Diaphaneity: Transparent to translucent
- Specific gravity: 3.516–3.525
- Optical properties: Biaxial (+)
- Refractive index: n_{α} = 1.614 n_{β} = 1.617 n_{γ} = 1.636
- Birefringence: δ = 0.022
- 2V angle: Measured: 46°, calculated: 44°
- Solubility: Soluble in acid

Hemimorphite is the chemical compound Zn_{4}(Si_{2}O_{7})(OH)_{2}·H_{2}O, a component of mineral calamine. It is a silicate mineral which, together with smithsonite (ZnCO_{3}), has been historically mined from the upper parts of zinc and lead ores. Both compounds were originally believed to be the same mineral and classified as calamine. In the second half of the 18th century, it was discovered that these two different compounds were both present in calamine. They closely resemble one another.

The silicate was the rarer of the two and was named hemimorphite because of the hemimorph development of its crystals. This unusual form, which is typical of only a few minerals, means that the crystals are terminated by dissimilar faces. The mineral's most common forms include massive crystalline crusts and layers; granular, rounded, and reniform aggregates, concentrically striated; or finely needle-shaped, fibrous or stalactitic, and rarely fan-shaped clusters of crystals.

Some specimens show strong green fluorescence in shortwave ultraviolet light (253.7 nm) and weak light pink fluorescence in longwave UV.

== Occurrence ==
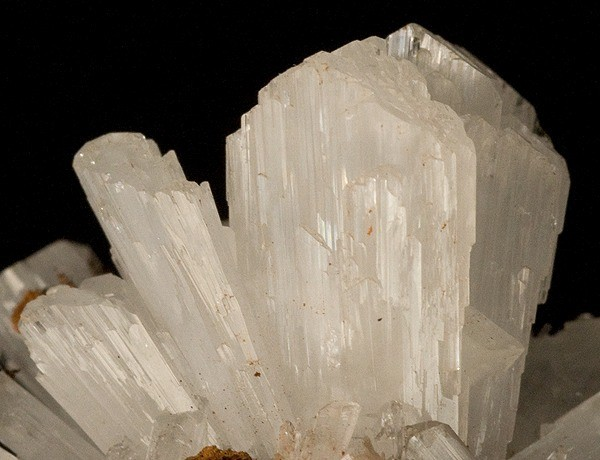
Hemimorphite "spray" of crystals from Durango, Mexico (size: 2.9 × 2.1 × 2.0 cm)

Hemimorphite most frequently occurs as the product of the oxidation of the upper parts of sphalerite-bearing ore bodies, accompanied by other secondary minerals which form the so-called iron cap or gossan. Hemimorphite is an important ore of zinc and contains up to 54.2% of the metal, together with silicon, oxygen and hydrogen. The crystals are blunt at one end and sharp at the other.

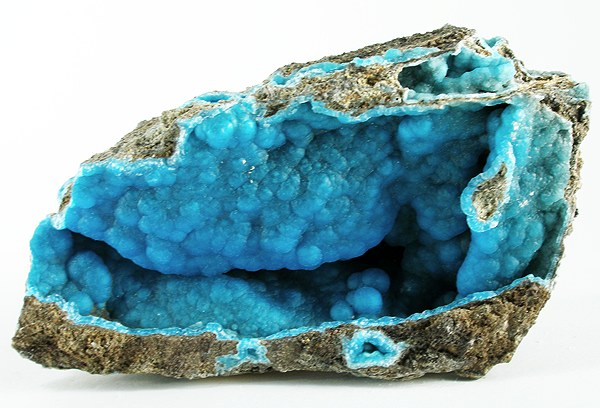
Blue vug-filling hemimorphite from Wenshan, Yunnan Province, China (size: 9.2 × 4.8 × 3.1 cm)

The regions on the Belgian-German border are well known for their deposits of hemimorphite of metasomatic origin, especially Vieille Montagne in Belgium and Aachen in Germany. Other deposits are in the Missouri lead-zinc district; Elkhorn, Montana; Leadville, Colorado; Organ Mountains, New Mexico; and near Phoenixville, Pennsylvania (all in the United States); in Tarnowskie Góry area in Upper Silesia, Poland; and in several localities in North Africa. Further hemimorphite occurrences are the Padaeng deposit near Mae Sod in western Thailand; Sardinia; Nerchinsk, Siberia; Cave del Predil, Italy; Bleiberg, Carinthia, Austria; and Matlock, Derbyshire, England.
