= Breinigerberg =

- Village of Stolberg
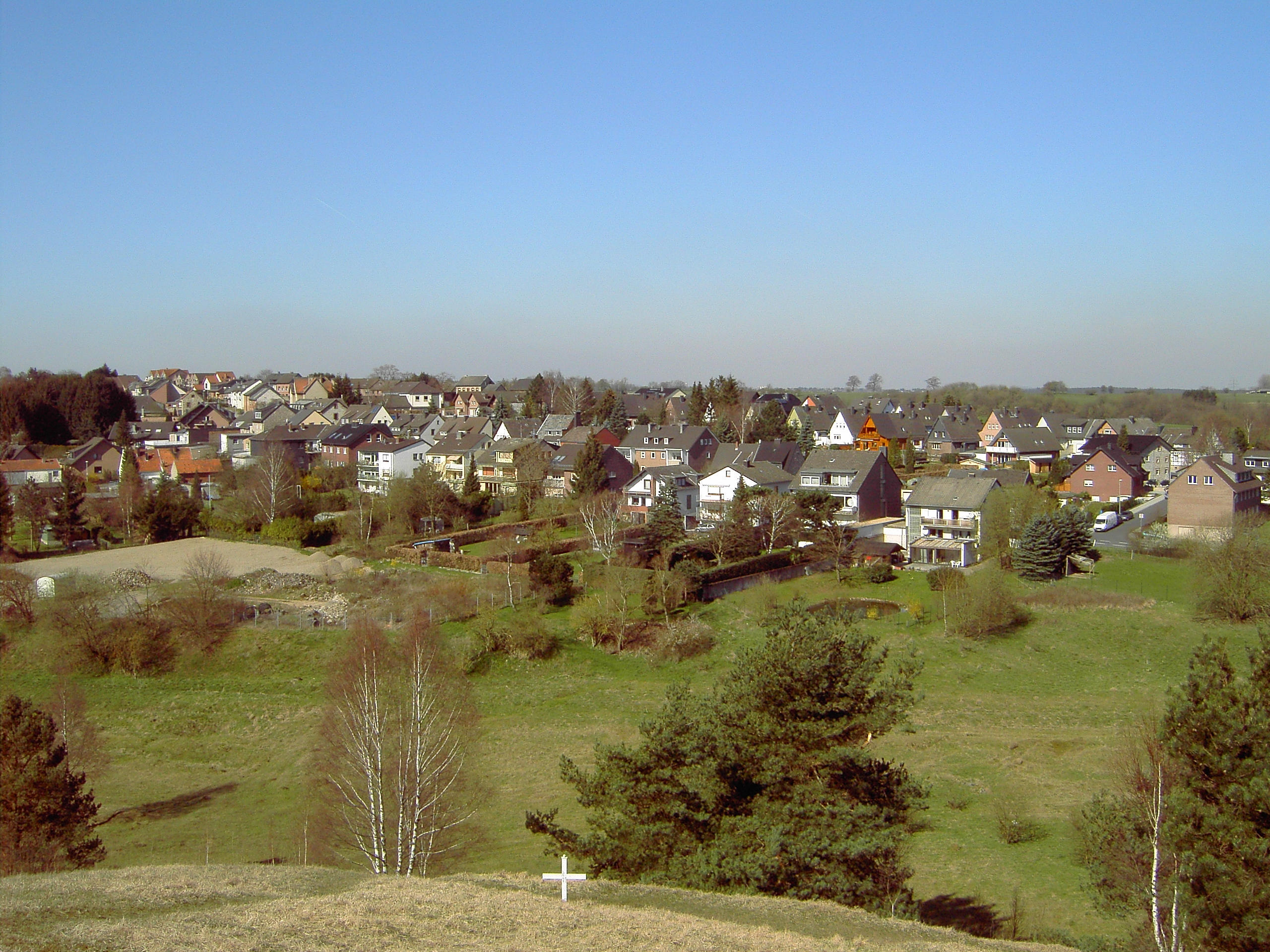
- Interactive map of Breinigerberg
- Location within Germany Location within North Rhine-Westphalia
- Coordinates: 50°44′N 6°14′E
- Country: Germany
- State: North Rhine-Westphalia
- Admin. region: Köln
- District: Aachen
- Town: Stolberg

Population (2017)
  - Total: 916
- Time zone: UTC+01:00 (CET)
  - Summer (DST): UTC+02:00 (CEST)
- Postal codes: 52223
- Dialling codes: 02402
- Vehicle registration: AC

Breinigerberg (German pronunciation: [ˈbʁaɪnɪɡɐˌbɛʁk]) is one of 17 districts and villages belonging to the town of Stolberg (Rhineland), which is one of the major towns in the borough of Aachen. According to a census dated 31 December 2005, the village had 971 inhabitants.

== Overview ==
The L12 country road passes through the centre of Breinigerberg and links it to Breinig to the west and the crossing of Nachtigaellchen to the east, which in turn is west of Mausbach.

To the east of Breinigerberg is the forest of Stolberg (part of the North Eifel Nature Park) and the Schlangenberg Nature Reserve which is famous for its calamine flora. The hill of Schlangenberg is 276 metres above sea level and originates in the former ore mine of Breinigerberg. Names like Bleiweg, which means "Way of lead", even today, give hints to the history of the village. The calamine from the ore mine Breinigerberg was used exclusively in Stolberg for the production of brass.

The history of Breinigerberg can be traced back to the Romans. Twenty five coins dated between 100 BC and the year 92/93 AD as well as remains of a Roman craftsmen settlement had been found in the village. The buildings show that the ancient Romans worked between 100 and 400 AD in this Breinigerberg region.

In the former primary school which was closed in 1988 an information centre on the Schlangenberg nature reserve has been opened by the Eifel- und Heimatverein Breinig. It is open to the public and presents detailed information on the special flora and fauna of the Schlangenberg region. Historical tools used in the ore mines of Breinigerberg are exhibited as well.

To the north and south of Breinigerberg there are further nature reserves like the Brockenberg or Baerenstein. Most of them are former chalk pits.

Breinigerberg has two sports grounds used by the local football team FC. Breinigerberg. The former primary school is also used as a youth centre (Remember).

One of the major events at Breinigerberg is the funfair one week after Pentecost.

== Literature ==
- Information sheet Naturschutzgebiet Schlangenberg of the Informationszentrum Breinigerberg by Eifel- und Heimatverein Breinig (in German)
- Zeitung d. Aachener Geschichtsvereins 45 Bd. (1923) p. 283/284 (in German)
