= 2008 Skorpion Zinc strike =

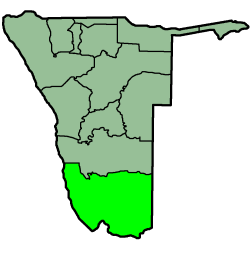
Map of Namibia featuring ǁKaras Region

The 2008 Skorpion Zinc strike was a worker's strike against the ownership of the Skorpion Zinc mine near the southern Namibian town of Rosh Pinah in ǁKaras Region. Skorpion Zinc is the largest zinc mine in Africa and the eighth largest in the world. Lasting 19 days (from May 10, 2008, to May 29, 2008), the workers ended their strike when management agreed to a 12 percent raise in wages plus overtime and travel expenses. The workers had originally demanded a 14 percent raise in wages. The strike was supported by the Namibia's Mineworkers Union of Namibia, who accused Skorpion Zinc of practising racial discrimination and of negotiating in bad faith.

== Effects ==
The strike only marginally affected outputs, as only a day's worth of production was lost during the 19-day strike.
