= Mineworkers Union of Namibia =

SWAPO-affiliated trade union in Namibia

Mineworkers' Union of Namibia
- "A People United Shall Never Be Defeated"

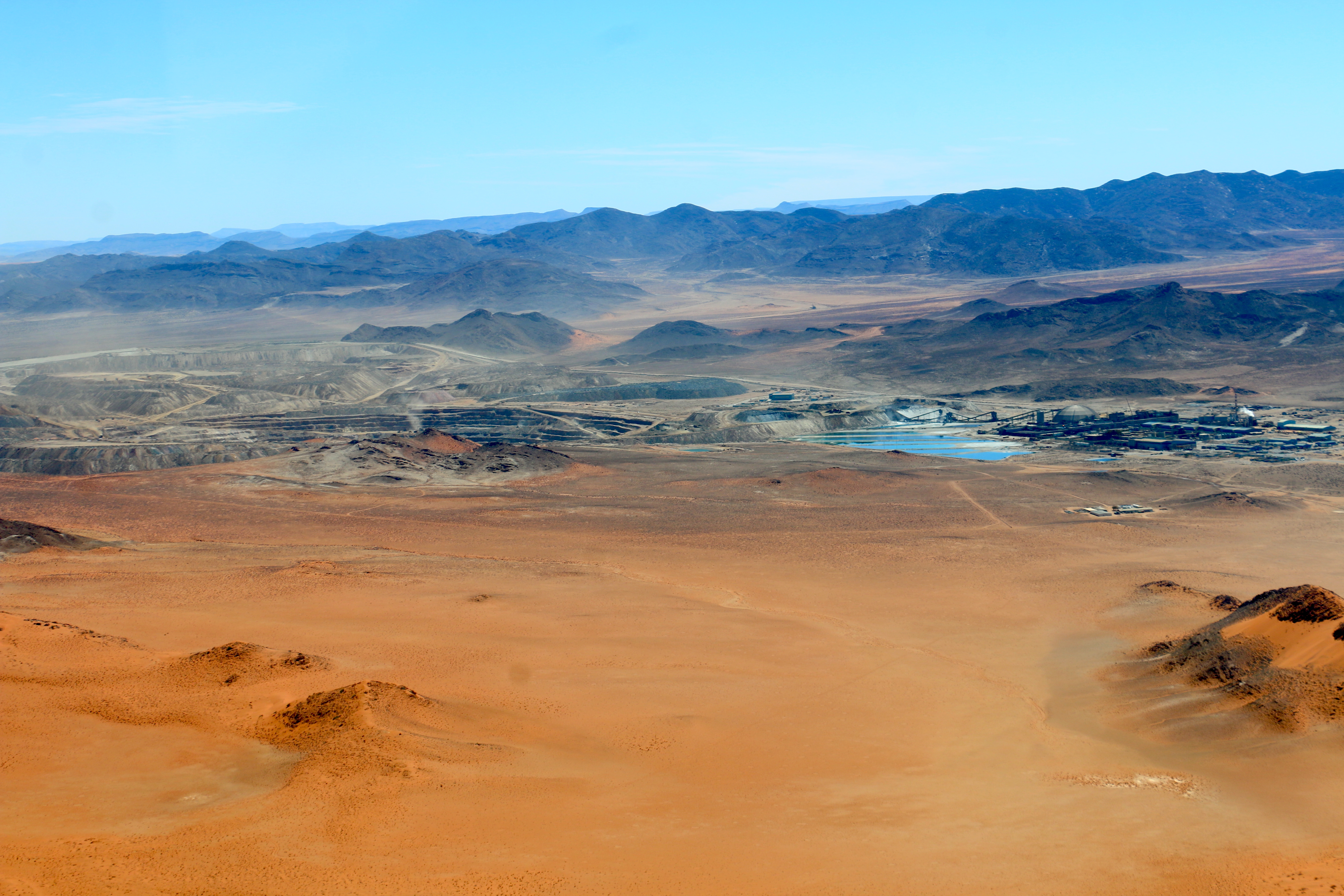
- Site of 2008 zinc strike
- Abbreviation: M.U.N.
- Established: 1986; 40 years ago
- Founder: Ben Ulenga
- Type: Trade union
- Headquarters: 7353 Mungunda Street, Windhoek, Namibia
- Region served: Namibia
- Methods: Collective bargaining, political advocacy, benefits administration
- Fields: Mining
- Members: 10,000 (2025)
- Secretary General: George Ampweya
- President (acting): Poco-Key Mberiuana
- VP (acting): Shavuka Mbidhi
- Secretary: Cde. Rebekka Bengela
- Treasurer: Maria Shikongo
- Subsidiaries: NAMIT
- Affiliations: National Union of Namibian Workers, South West Africa People's Organization
- Website: Official site

The Mineworkers Union of Namibia (MUN) is one of the most powerful of Namibia's trade unions. It plays a leading public role in the Namibian political space and is an ally of the ruling South West Africa People's Organization (SWAPO) government. The MUN was established in 1986. It is affiliated with the National Union of Namibian Workers (NUNW) national trade union center and had about 8,000 members in 2017.

== Strikes ==
The MUN supported the 2008 Skorpion Zinc Strike, accusing Skorpion Zinc of practising racial discrimination and of negotiating in bad faith.

== Criticisms ==
MUN has been accused of "dishonesty and neglect over unfulfilled promises to beneficiaries" in connection with a company it owns, Namibia Miners Investment Trust (Namit), established to support union members. When in 2025 government pushed for a majority stake in all new mining operations, MUN was criticised for defending this policy.

== Notable members ==
- John Shaetonhodi, union president 1986–1995, later deputy labour minister
- Bernhardt Esau, secretary general of NUNW, a national trade union center, later fisheries minister
- Asser Kuveri Kapere, president from 1987-1991
- Peter Naholo, secretary general from 1993-2001
- Ben Ulenga, founder of MUN
