= Oranjemund Constituency =

Electoral constituency in ǁKaras region, Namibia

Coordinates: 28°33′S 16°26′E

Oranjemund constituency (red) in the ǁKaras Region

Oranjemund is a constituency in the ǁKaras Region of Namibia. It covers an area of 4,623 km^{2} (1,785 sq mi) and had a population of 9,837 in 2011, up from 7,789 in 2001. The main towns are the district capital Oranjemund and the mining town of Rosh Pinah, the constituency also contains the Sendelingsdrift border post. As of 2020 the constituency had 7,894 registered voters.

Economic activities concentrate on mining and tourism, the current unemployment rate is 48%.

== Politics ==
Oranjemund Constituency is traditionally a stronghold of the South West Africa People's Organization (SWAPO) party. In the 2004 regional elections, its candidate Toivo Nambala declared winner and became councillor after no opposition party nominated a candidate. In the 2010 regional elections, SWAPO's Eliphas Iita won the constituency with 1,928 votes. His only challenger was Ignatius Murorua of the Rally for Democracy and Progress (RDP), who received 257 votes.

Also in the 2015 regional elections the candidate of SWAPO won and Lasarus Angula Nangolo was elected with 2,607 votes against his challenger Simon Haulofu of RDP who received 201 votes. Nangolo was re-elected in the 2020 regional election after obtaining 1,730 votes. Ruben Andreas of the Independent Patriots for Change (IPC, an opposition party formed in August 2020) came second with 980 votes, and Emerentia Riekert of the Landless People's Movement (LPM, a new party registered in 2018) came third with 628 votes.
