= Peter Naholo =

Namibian politician and former trade unionist

Peter Naholo is a Namibian politician and former trade unionist. Naholo was a combatant with the People's Liberation Army of Namibia (PLAN), the military wing of the SWAPO liberation movement. In 2009, he was placed sixth on the National Assembly list for the newly formed Rally for Democracy and Progress and earned a seat in the National Assembly of Namibia. On 14 September 2010, Naholo and 8 other opposition NA members were sworn in after boycotting the National Assembly due to electoral irregularities in the 2009 general election. On 19 October 2010, Naholo gave his first speech a member of the National Assembly; in that speech, Naholo asserted that some SWAPO politicians had enriched themselves through government since independence before being shouted down and asked to withdraw the accusation by Speaker Theo-Ben Gurirab. Later in the same session, several members of SWAPO accused Naholo and other RDP members of enriching themselves while in government as SWAPO members.

== Trade Unions ==
Naholo was the Secretary General of the Mineworkers Union of Namibia from 1993 to 2001.
