= Rosh Pinah =

- Settlement
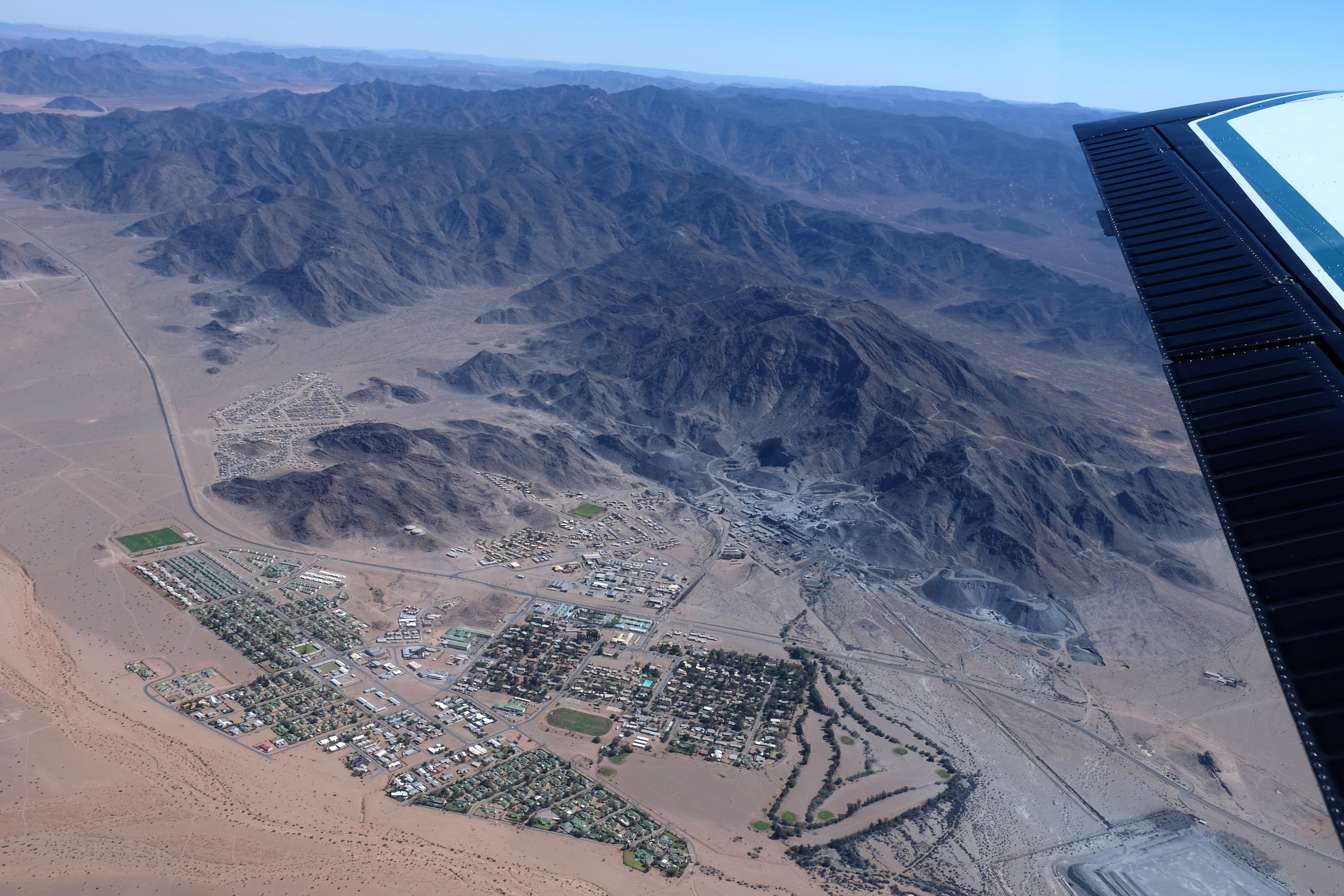
- Bird's eye view of Rosh Pinah (October 2016)

- Location in Namibia
- Coordinates: 27°57′54″S 16°45′36″E
- Country: Namibia
- Region: ǁKaras Region
- Constituency: Oranjemund Constituency

Population (2011)
  - Total: 2,835
- Time zone: UTC+2 (South African Standard Time)

Rosh Pinah is a mining town located in southern Namibia, close to the border with South Africa. It is situated 360 kilometres (220 mi) south of Keetmanshoop in Namibia's ǁKaras Region. West of the town lies Diamond Area 1, the main diamond mining area of Namibia. Rosh Pinah is in the Oranjemund electoral constituency. The town is connected via road to Aus and Oranjemund.

Copper was discovered here in the 1920s, and German-born Jew Mose Kohan discovered zinc in the nearby Hunz Mountains in 1963. He also coined the name "Rosh Pinah" which is a Hebrew term for "cornerstone". More significant deposits of zinc were found in 1968.

Rosh Pinah is home to two mines, Skorpion Zinc and Rosh Pinah mine. Both mines extract mainly zinc and lead. Like other mining towns in Namibia, the settlement was created when the first mine opened. The Rosh Pinah mine was established in 1969 and has been in continuous operation since then. Skorpion Zinc opened in 2001 and is the eighth-largest zinc mine in the world. It is the largest employer in town, providing 1,900 jobs.

The settlement is administered by the company RoshSkor (named after and co-owned by both mining operators) because it does not have its own local government authority and falls, like all Namibian settlements, under its regional administration. The town manager is Slabbert Burger. The town is economically entirely dependent on its mines which own 90% of the property and provide the vast majority of jobs. "If the mines close, Rosh Pinah will become another Kolmanskop, as we are not sustainable as a town", Burger stated in 2019. Hoeksteen Combined School and Tsau ǁKhaeb Secondary School are government schools located in town.

Decades of mining lead and zinc have led to chronic lead exposure of Rosh Pinah's inhabitants. In 2020, a report was compiled by the company medical practitioner of the zinc mine, confirming chronic lead exposure of all 30 children that were tested. The report was not published, and the doctor was dismissed. When the lead poisoning came to light in 2023, accounts from local doctors hint at hundreds of cases over several years.

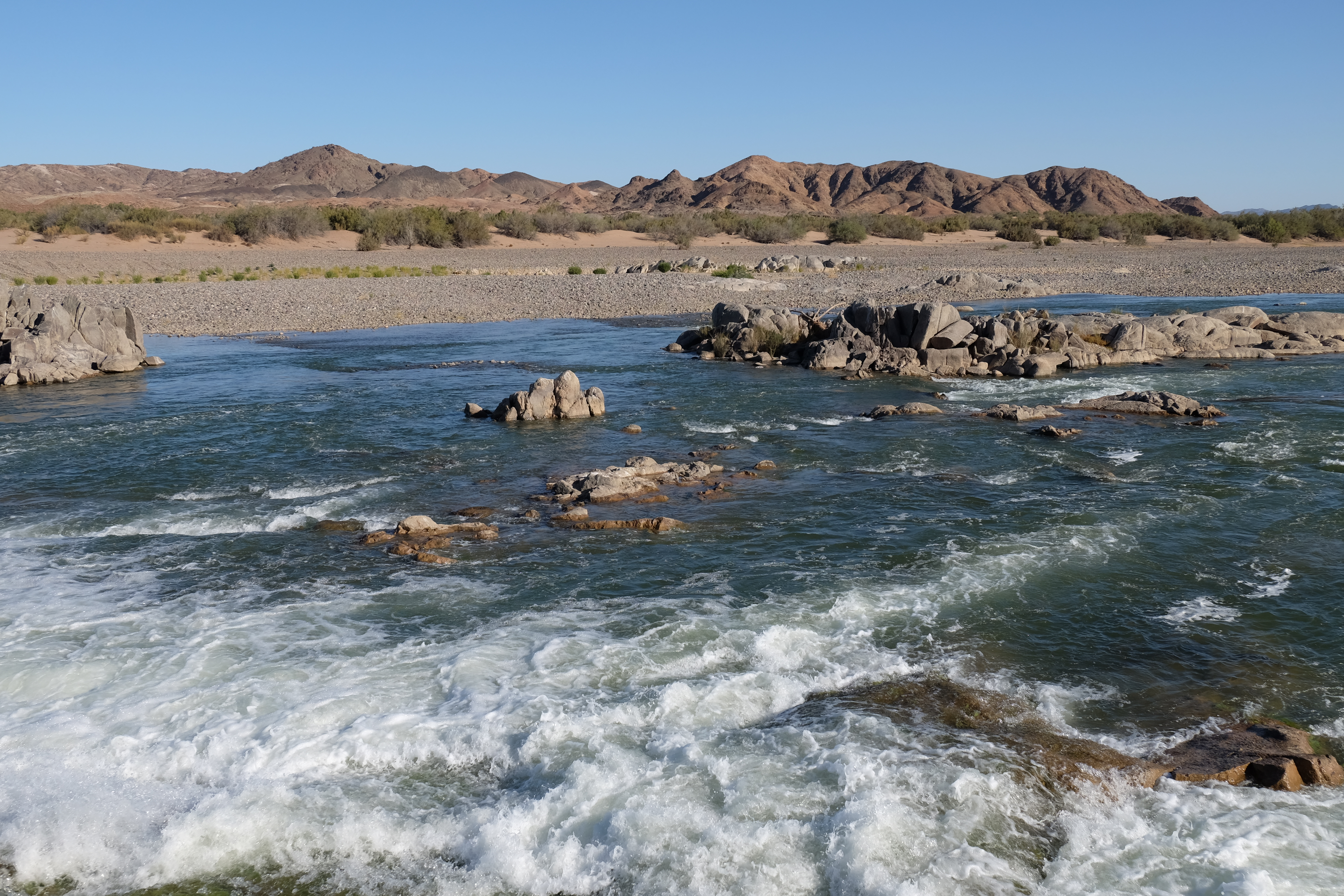
Orange River near Rosh Pinah (October 2016)

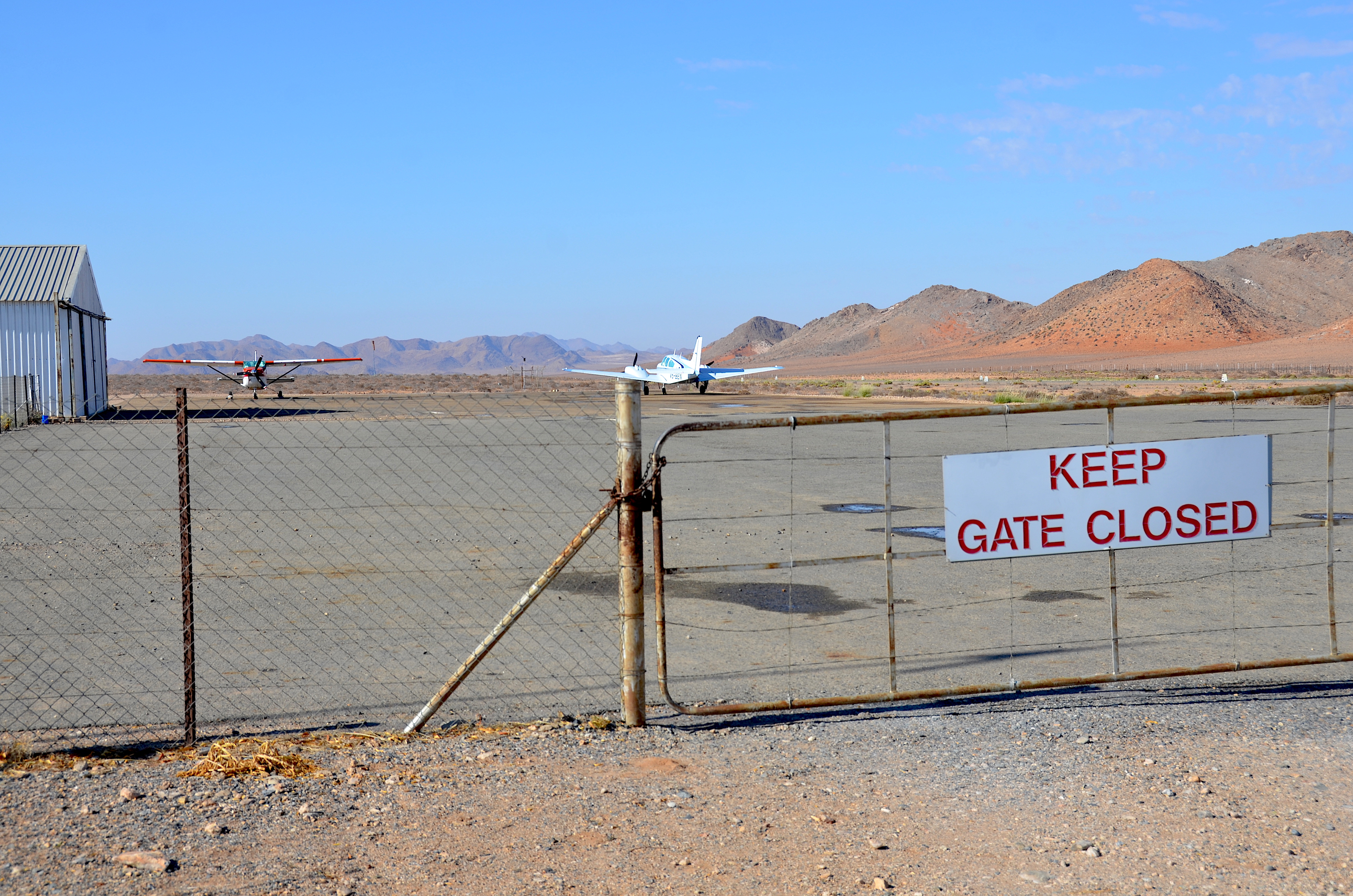
Rosh Pinah Skorpion Airfield (2017)

Pronunciation of Rosh Pinah
