= Zinc molybdate =

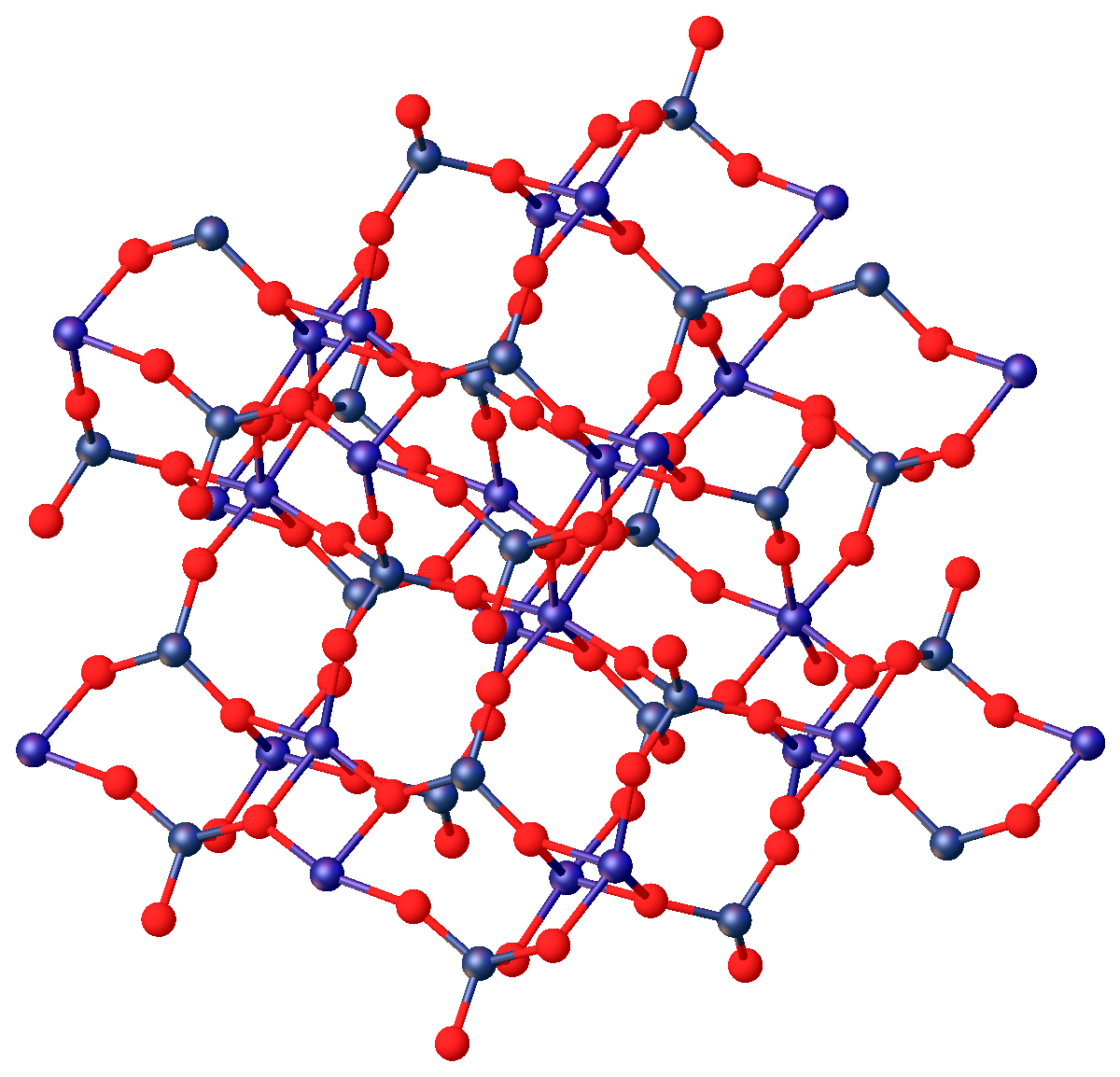

Identifiers
CAS Number	13767-32-3
3D model (JSmol)	Interactive image
ECHA InfoCard	100.033.965
EC Number	237-377-8
PubChem CID	16213780
UNII	302KZX2NIS
CompTox Dashboard (EPA)	DTXSID10893960
- InChI: InChI=1S/Mo.4O.Zn/q;;;2*-1;+2 Key: XAEWLETZEZXLHR-UHFFFAOYSA-N
- SMILES: [O-][Mo](=O)(=O)[O-].[Zn+2]

Properties
Chemical formula	ZnMoO_{4}
Molar mass	225.33 g/mol
Appearance	white tetragonal crystals
Density	4.32 g/cm^{3}
Melting point	900 °C (1,650 °F; 1,170 K)
Solubility in water	insoluble

Structure
Crystal structure	tetragonal

Hazards
- GHS labelling
Pictograms	(GHS07: Exclamation mark) (GHS09: Environmental hazard)
Signal word	Warning
Hazard statements	H315, H319, H335, H411
Precautionary statements	P261, P264, P264+P265, P271, P273, P280, P302+P352, P304+P340, P305+P351+P338, P319, P321, P332+P317, P337+P317, P362+P364, P391, P403+P233, P405, P501
NFPA 704 (fire diamond)	2 0 0
- Lethal dose or concentration (LD, LC)
LD_{50} (median dose)	11,500 mg/kg (oral, rat)
- Except where otherwise noted, data are given for materials in their standard state (at 25 °C [77 °F], 100 kPa). verify (what is ?) Infobox references

Zinc molybdate is an inorganic compound with the formula ZnMoO_{4}. It is used as a white pigment, which is also a corrosion inhibitor. A related pigment is sodium zinc molybdate, Na_{2}Zn(MoO_{4})_{2}. The material has also been investigated as an electrode material.

In terms of its structure, the Mo(VI) centers are tetrahedral and the Zn(II) centers are octahedral.

== Safety ==
While highly soluble molybdates like e.g. sodium molybdate are toxic in higher doses, zinc molybdate is essentially non-toxic because of its insolubility in water. Molybdates possess a lower toxicity than chromates or lead salts and are therefore seen as an alternative to these salts for corrosion inhibition.
