= Zinc transporter 3 =

Protein found in humans

SLC30A3

Identifiers
- Aliases: SLC30A3, ZNT3, solute carrier family 30 member 3
- External IDs: OMIM: 602878; MGI: 1345280; GeneCards: SLC30A3

Gene location (Human)
Chr.	Chromosome 2 (human)
Band	2p23.3	Start	27,253,684 bp
Band	2p23.3	End	27,275,817 bp

Gene location (Mouse)
Chr.	Chromosome 5 (mouse)
Band	5 B1|5 16.97 cM	Start	31,243,450 bp
Band	5 B1|5 16.97 cM	End	31,265,581 bp
RNA expression pattern
Bgee	Human / Mouse (ortholog); Top expressed in: corpus epididymis; Brodmann area 10; left testis; right testis; endothelial cell; right frontal lobe; dorsolateral prefrontal cortex; Brodmann area 9; Brodmann area 46; middle temporal gyrus / Top expressed in: entorhinal cortex; perirhinal cortex; zygote; CA3 field; visual cortex; primary visual cortex; secondary oocyte; superior frontal gyrus; dentate gyrus of hippocampal formation granule cell; Ileal epithelium; More reference expression data
BioGPS	n/a
Gene ontology
Molecular function	ABC-type zinc transporter activity; protein binding; cation transmembrane transporter activity; zinc ion transmembrane transporter activity
Cellular component	synapse; integral component of plasma membrane; late endosome membrane; lysosomal membrane; synaptic vesicle membrane; cytoplasm; endosome; cell junction; lysosome; integral component of membrane; late endosome; membrane; cytoplasmic vesicle; neuron projection; synaptic vesicle; integral component of synaptic vesicle membrane; hippocampal mossy fiber to CA3 synapse; glutamatergic synapse; plasma membrane
Biological process	response to zinc ion; ion transport; positive regulation of transport; cation transport; regulation of sequestering of zinc ion; cation transmembrane transport; zinc ion transport; zinc ion transmembrane transport; transmembrane transport; zinc ion import into synaptic vesicle
Sources:Amigo / QuickGO
Orthologs
Databases	NCBI: entry; OMA: entry
Species	Human	Mouse
Entrez	7781	22784
Ensembl	ENSG00000115194	ENSMUSG00000029151
UniProt	Q99726	P97441
RefSeq (mRNA)	NM_003459; NM_001318949; NM_001318950; NM_001318951	NM_011773; NM_001347323
RefSeq (protein)	NP_001305878; NP_001305879; NP_001305880; NP_003450	NP_001334252; NP_035903
Location (UCSC)	Chr 2: 27.25 – 27.28 Mb	Chr 5: 31.24 – 31.27 Mb
PubMed search
- Wikidata
View/Edit Human	View/Edit Mouse

Zinc transporter 3 also known as solute carrier family 30 member 3 is a protein in humans that is encoded by the SLC30A3 gene.

The SLC30A3 gene codes for the ZnT-3 SLC30A family membrane transport protein. ZnT-3 is required for the accumulation of zinc ions inside synaptic vesicles. In mice, ZnT-3 is required for some forms of memory that depend on the hippocampus and the amygdala. Zinc transport by ZnT-3 modulates memory formation by acting through the extracellular signal-regulated kinases signaling pathway. Angiotensin II-induced senescence of vascular smooth muscle cells requires down-regulation of ZnT-3 and ZnT-10.

== See also ==
- Solute carrier family
