= Skorpion Zinc =

Zinc mine in Namibia

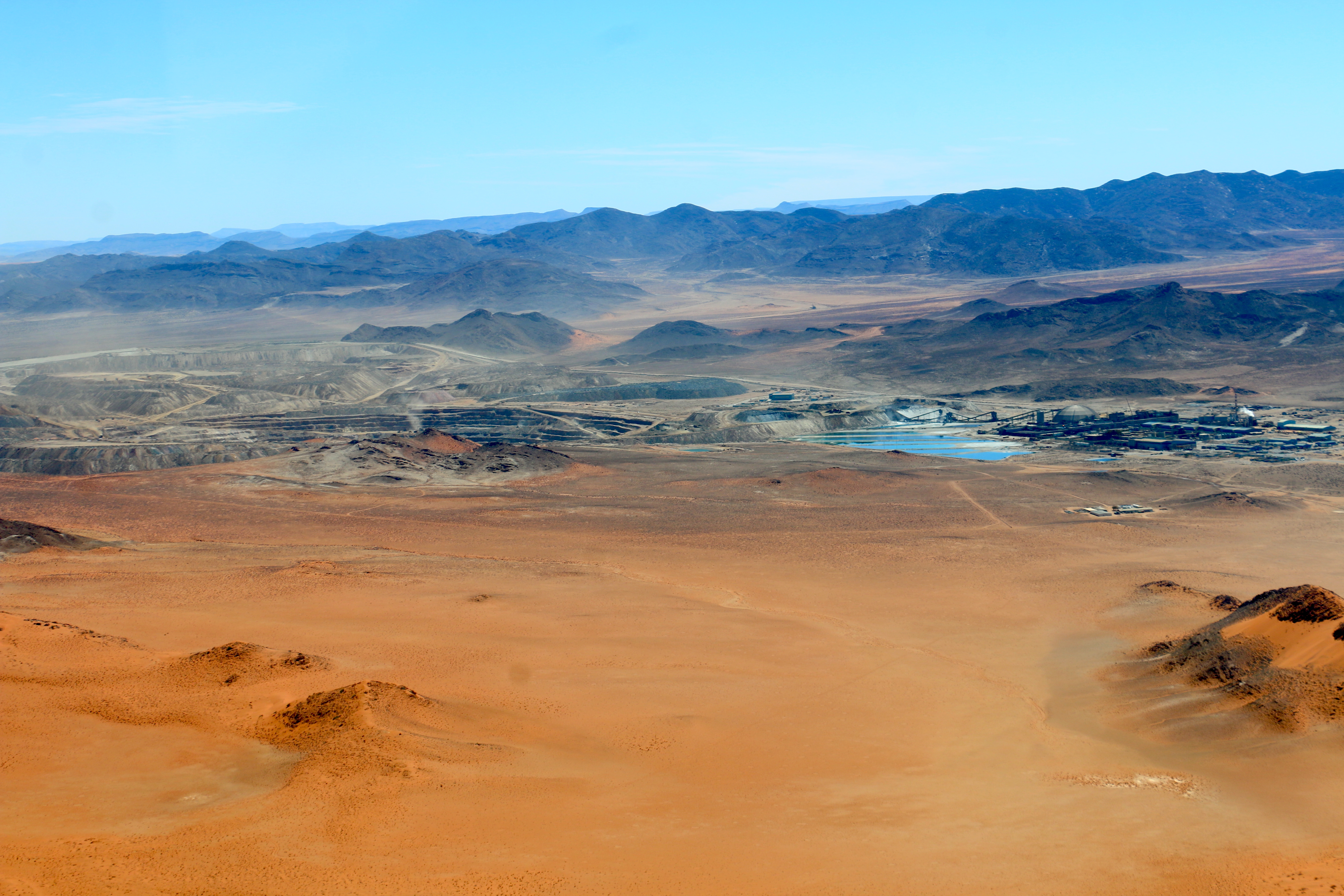
- Aerial view of Skorpion Zink Mine

- Location in Namibia
- Location: Rosh Pinah, ǁKharas Region, Namibia; 27°49′07″S 016°36′00″E
- Products: Zinc
- Production: 66,000 tonnes
- Financial year: 2018
- Opened: 2003
- Company: Vedanta Resources
- Website: Vedanta Subpage
- Acquired: 2010

Skorpion Zinc is a zinc mine in the ǁKaras Region of southern Namibia, producing Special High Grade (SHG) zinc. The mine is situated near Rosh Pinah. It was established at a cost of US$450 million by Anglo American in 2003. It is the tenth-largest zinc mine in the world, and the largest employer in Rosh Pinah, providing 1,900 jobs.

Skorpion is a unique mine in several ways. Firstly, it is a supergene zinc ore body composed of alluvial accumulations of zinc carbonate and silicate minerals of detrital nature deposited within a palaeochannel. There are no other commercially viable deposits of this type. It is also one of the few mines in the world that mines zinc oxides, a mixture of non-sulphidic zinc minerals such as smithsonite, hydrozincite, tarbuttite and willemite. Finally, it is the only zinc processing facility to use solvent extraction-electrowinning metallurgy to process and refine its zinc products (others using conventional smelting and roasting).

The Skorpion SX-EW plant creates Special High Grade, ultra-pure zinc cathode as a primary product, which is so low in impurities that it commands a price premium.

In November 2010 the project was acquired by Vedanta Resources at a cost of US$707 million. In 2019, Vedanta announced mining would be suspended for a four months due to technical problems. Then in 2020 Vedanta placed the mine on care and maintenance due to pit failures.

== See also ==
- Rosh Pinah mine
- 2008 Skorpion Zinc strike

== Sources ==
- Gregor Borg, Katrin Kärner, Mike Buxton, Richard Armstrong, Schalk W. van der Merwe (2003). "Geology of the Skorpion Supergene Zinc Deposit, Southern Namibia". Economic Geology. 98 (4): 749–771. doi:10.2113/98.4.749.

== See also ==
- Mining in Namibia
