= South African Marine Corps =

South African Corps of Marines
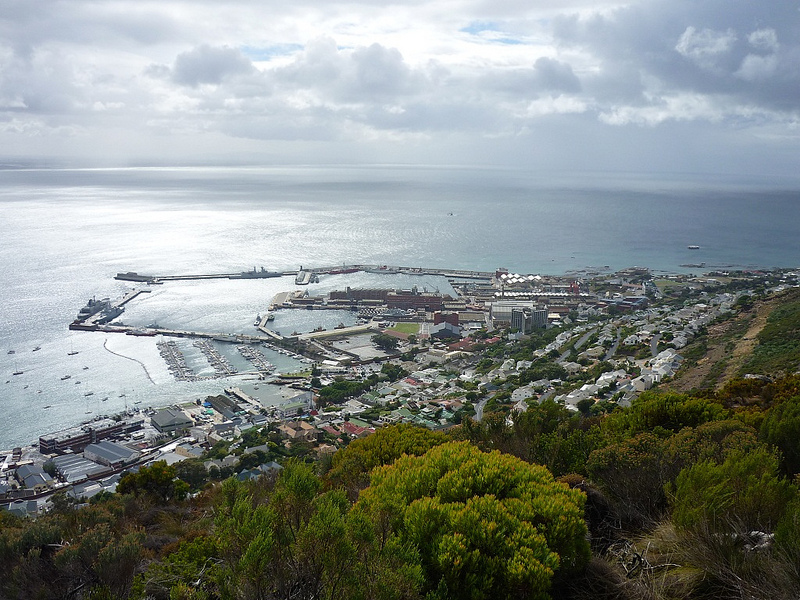
- Simonstown Naval Base entrances were protected by guns of the Marines coastal and AA artillery
- Founded: 1951; 75 years ago
- Disbanded: 1 October 1955; 71 years ago
- Country: South Africa
- Branch: South African Navy
- Role: Coastal and anti-aircraft artillery
- Size: Division

1 South African Marine Brigade
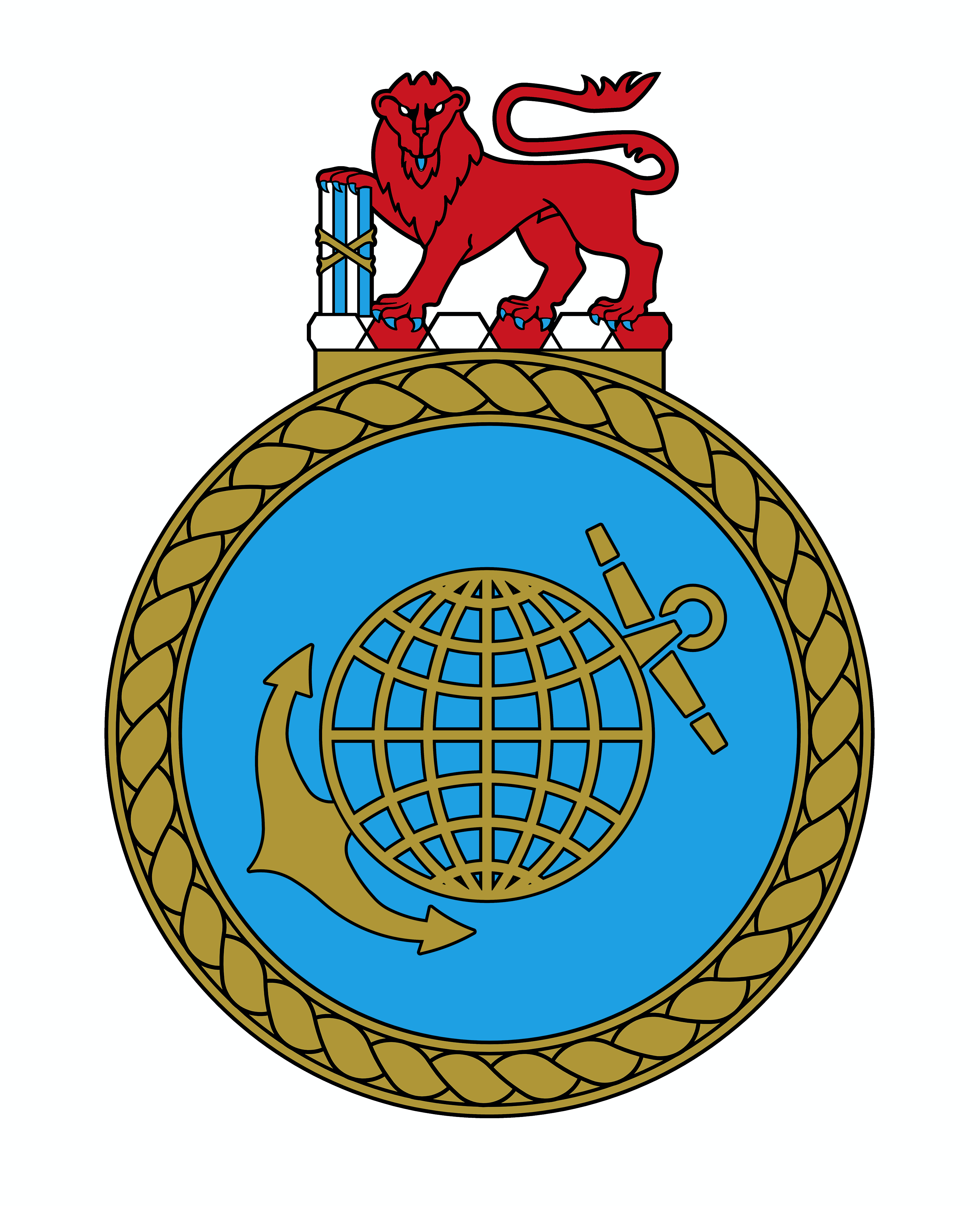
- 1 Marine Bde crest
- Active: 1979–1990
- Disbanded: 1990
- Country: South Africa
- Branch: South African Navy
- Type: Amphibious light infantry
- Role: Marine infantry
- Size: Brigade

Commanders
- First OC 1 Mrn Bde: Capt (SAN) R. (Dick) Shelver
- Second and last OC 1 Marine Bde: Capt (SAN) Michael St.J. Thomson

Insignia
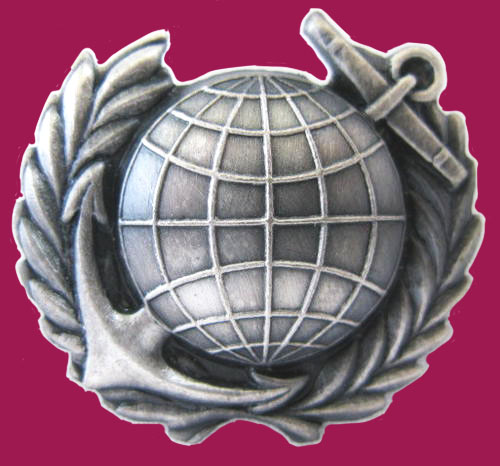
- 1 Mrn Bde Marine Breast Badge

South Africa does not currently have a marine corps, though in the past it did. It was originally set up as a sub-branch of the South African Navy during the apartheid era, with the primary purpose of protecting the country's harbours (1951–1955). Then it was recreated in 1979 during the South African Border War as 1 Marine Brigade with the aim of serving as marine infantry (1979–1990). Today, the SAN Maritime Reaction Squadron is the closest analogue to a marine corps South Africa has.

== South African Corps of Marines ==
=== Establishment of Coast Garrison Force ===
The South African Corps of Marines was established as a corps in 1951, though the unit has it origins much earlier than 1951.

In 1912, a Coast Garrison Force was established consisting of two Corps, the South African Garrison Artillery (SAGA) and the South African Coast Defence Corps. In turn, the South African Garrison Artillery consisted of two Divisions.

- 1st Division SAGA – this division had previously been a Cape Colonial Force Volunteer unit, and became the Cape Garrison Artillery. The Cape Garrison Artillery manned batteries at Sea Point, Fort Wynyard, The Castle at Cape Town, as well as Noah's Ark and other Batteries at Simonstown.
- 2nd Division SAGA. This division was converted from "A" and "B" Batteries of the Natal Field Artillery and was known as the "Durban Garrison Artillery," commanded by Lt. Col. C. Wilson. They manned four 15-pounder guns mounted on the concrete gunpits on Durban Bluff which years previously had been manned by the Royal Naval Volunteer Reserve.

==== First World War ====
On the decision to invade German South-West Africa, the need for Heavy Artillery was recognised and a Heavy Artillery Brigade was formed in 1915 to accompany the SA Expeditionary Force. Command was given to Lt. Col. J. M. Rose, Royal Marine Artillery, and the Brigade was constituted from elements of the RMA stationed in South Africa, together with officers and men of the Cape and Durban Garrison Artilleries. The initial one Brigade was eventually expanded into three Brigades, ultimately consisting of 60 officers and 1,000 other ranks. Durban Garrison Artillery provided "K" Heavy Battery armed with 12-pounders, which accompanied Col. Berrange's Eastern Force in German South-West Africa, and "N" Heavy Battery armed with 6-inch 30-cwt. Howitzers was attached to Northern Force. The Northern Force was also strengthened by the remainder of the Heavy Artillery Brigade consisting of "0" Battery, armed with 4-inch Naval Guns; "D" Battery with 12-pounder Naval Guns and "F" Battery with 5-inch Howitzers.

On the conclusion of the War, the Coast Garrison Force was reconstituted, and in 1921 the SA Permanent Garrison Artillery was established to undertake maintenance and instruction with the Coast Garrison Force. In due course the Permanent Garrison Artillery and the Coast Garrison Force became so integrated that Coast Garrison units were commanded and administered by permanent force officers who were in turn understudied by the more numerous Coast Garrison Force officers.

==== World War II ====
The approach of war led to expansion of artillery forces and in 1934, the Cape Garrison Artillery became 1st and 2nd Batteries of the Cape Artillery Brigade which was equipped with Heavy Coast Batteries, two medium Batteries with 60-pounders and 6-inch howitzers, and was also responsible for the operation of No.1 Armoured Train. During World War II, permanent Batteries of Heavy Artillery were established from Walvis Bay to Durban, being responsible for general coast defence. With the aid of the new part-time Coast Defence Corps units specially created to assist the Permanent Units, many Cape Artillery Brigade troops were released for full-time volunteer service with Artillery in the Desert and Italy.

This Coast Defence Corps was different from the South African Coast Defence Corps created by the South Africa Defence Act, 1912. It was created at the time of Japanese landings in the Far East and when the East Coast of Africa was believed threatened. Consequently, the objective was to form a force specially mustered to repulse coastal landings. The effectiveness of the SA Coast Defences can be gauged from the fact that no German vessels ever attempted to bombard South African ports and the only time that a shot was fired in anger was when the Portuguese frigate Afonso d'Albuquerque neglected to respond to signals on passing a shore station. One round was sufficient to bring her to, and she was duly identified.

=== South African Corps of Marines ===
Brig. Pieter de Waal on insistence of South African officers who had served in the Royal Marines, led the establishment of the SA Corps of Marines on 1 July 1951, when he became the first Naval and Marine Chief of Staff, on the abolition of the post of Director-General of Naval Forces. In tribute to his services, De Waal Battery, the heavy battery on Robben Island, is named after him.

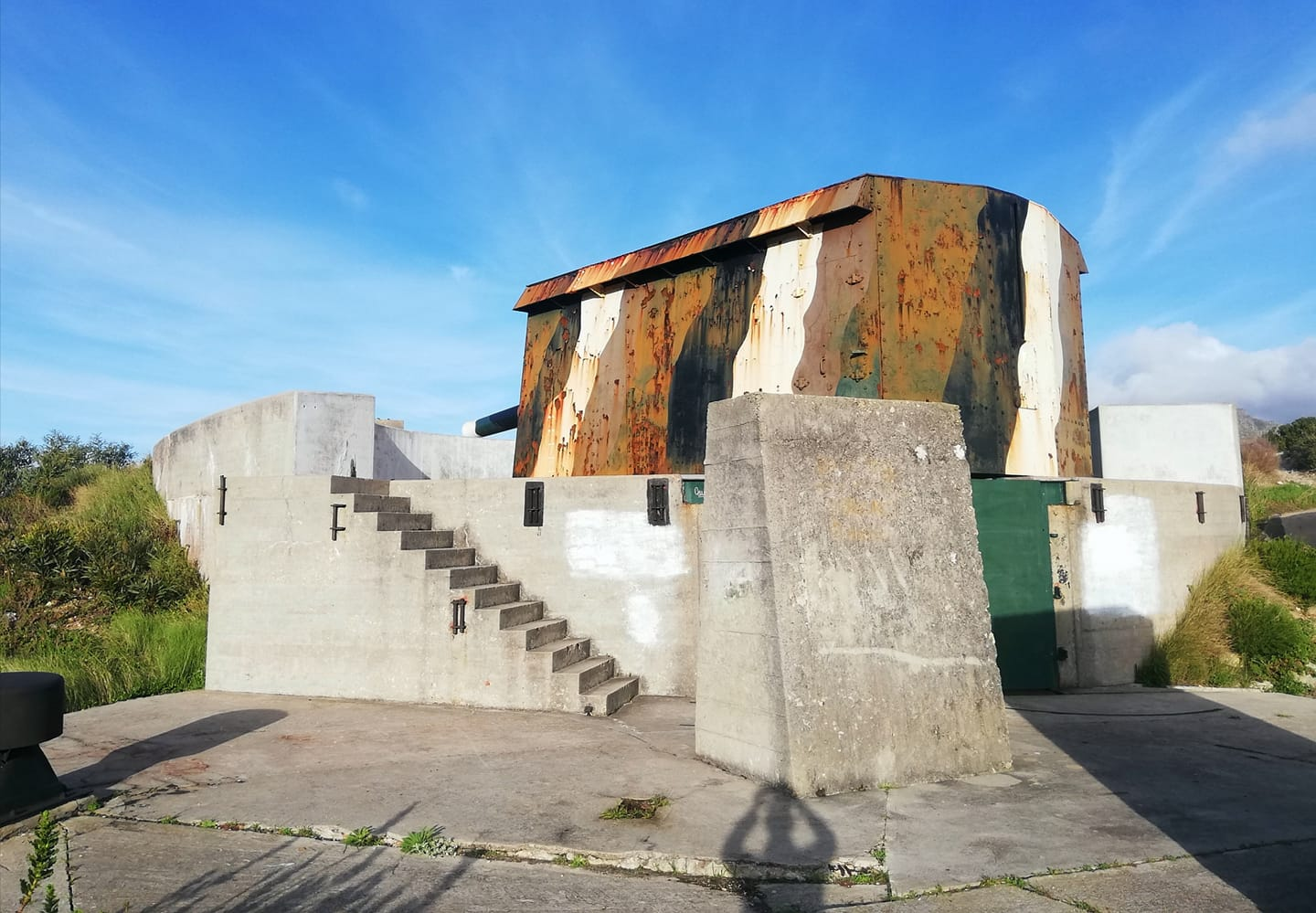
Naval gun and gun emplacement manned by Coastal Artillery during WWII, Simonstown, South Africa

The South African Corps of Marines which began to function as a Corps in 1951, consisted of:

- 8 Permanent Force Coast Regiments,
- A Marine Technical Centre,
- The Marine Branch of the Naval and Marine Gymnasium,
- One Training Unit (PF),
- Seven Citizen Force Coast Regiments including I and 2 Coast Regiments (CGA) and 4 Coast Regiment (DGA),
- One Heavy Battery at Walvis Bay,
- Two Light Anti-Aircraft Regiments,
- Four Heavy Anti-Aircraft Batteries
- Three Radar Companies

The role of the Marines was the Coastal Artillery, Anti-Aircraft and Radar defence of South African ports and coast, the Anti-Aircraft defence of other strategic points in South Africa and provision of Light Anti-Aircraft Artillery for South African forces in the field. In addition Marines, including the Active Citizen Force Marines were trained on water assault tactics and also in infantry patrolling and tactics. Marine complements were maintained on certain ships and the SAS Simon van der Stel, was brought to South Africa by a crew containing a Permanent Force Marine complement. On occasion, small groups of Citizen Force Marines also accompanied naval vessels afloat. Brig. de Waal's object was to train a Marine Corps to the same standard as those of the Royal Marines and the United States Marine Corps.

The Marines were greatly favoured for ceremonial activities, owing to their striking dark blue service dress embellished with orange trouser stripes. They frequently formed the guard at Government House when the Governor-General was in Durban or Cape Town and also furnished a guard of honour for Prince Bernhard of the Netherlands on his visit in 1954. On Union Day 1952 they provided the Colour Guard for the Naval Colour at the combined parade held by all the fighting services at Kingsmead, Durban, when Brig. de Waal was inspecting officer and the parade was commanded by Commandant P. F. van der Hoven, O.C., 4 Coast Regiment, SACM. It is understood that the Governor-General of the time contemplated their constitution as a Household Corps in the manner of the Brigade of Guards, but that their disbandment prevented this. A detachment led by Comdt. van der Hoven, led the South African contingent in the Coronation parade in London in 1953.

By 1954 the Marines had been found to be functioning well and it was hoped to extend their functions to the manning of guns on defensively equipped merchant ships and the manning of coast defence vessels, such as the Gelderland (for which purpose officers would have obtained the Board of Trade Navigation Certificate). It was also intended to form fully integrated composite regiments where Coast, Anti-Aircraft and Radar elements were found at one centre, and for this purpose units were to be renamed "Marine Regiments", and the title of "Coast Regiments" being abandoned. A Marine band was established for the Fleet under the direction of Capt. Imrie.

The introduction of Soviet warships equipped with guided missile launchers at this time rendered counter-bombardment forces out-of-date and an unwarranted expense. Acting on advice from abroad, the authorities decided to abandon Coastal Artillery since it was felt there was no justification for the retention of the Corps and in the absence of the main function, the Marine Corps was disbanded on 1 October 1955. Anti-Aircraft Artillery reverted to the Army, and the Coast and Radar units were embodied in the Navy.

The last time the Marines were seen on a large parade was when the 1st Coast Regiment was disbanded and their Colours were laid up in St. George's Cathedral, Cape Town in 1955

== 1 South African Marine Brigade ==
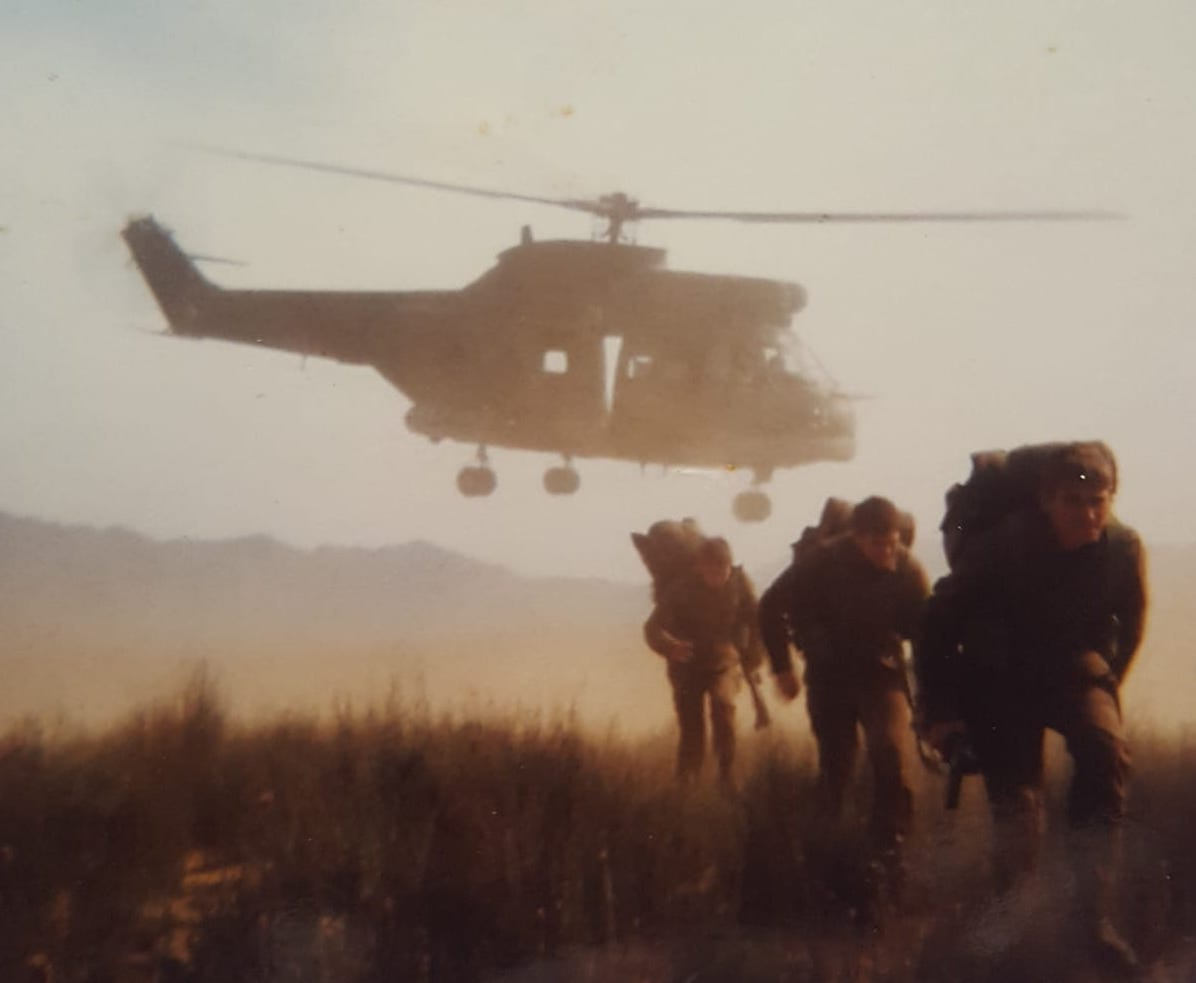
South African Marines in training in Touwsriver, Cape. 1983

The second marine force was formed in 1979 in order to enable the South African Navy to take a greater part in counterinsurgency operations. A brigade-strength unit was envisaged and was designated as 1 South African Marine Brigade. However, training and operational units never exceeded one or two battalions in strength. The initial vision was for a fully seaborne amphibious brigade that could be deployed on operations in the southern Angolan and Mozambique regions and ports. However, budget cuts, a greater emphasis on land-based raids into southern Angola by the SADF as well as the strong defensive capabilities of the major Angolan ports led to the original plans being changed. A more limited role was envisaged, which included developing a force capable of providing beachhead protection to allow the extraction of special forces when required.

Furthermore, the Marines deployed Marine Companies which operated as regular infantry but were also responsible for conducting riverine patrols in the eastern Caprivi of the north eastern border of South-West Africa until 1988. Thereafter their role became that of conducting counter-insurgency operations inside South Africa while small Marine platoon sized units performed harbour protection duties using Namacurra-class harbour patrol boat (HPBs) in the major South African harbours.

A limited Marine amphibious landing capability, using Delta boat landing craft from SAS Tafelberg, was retained until the brigade was disbanded.

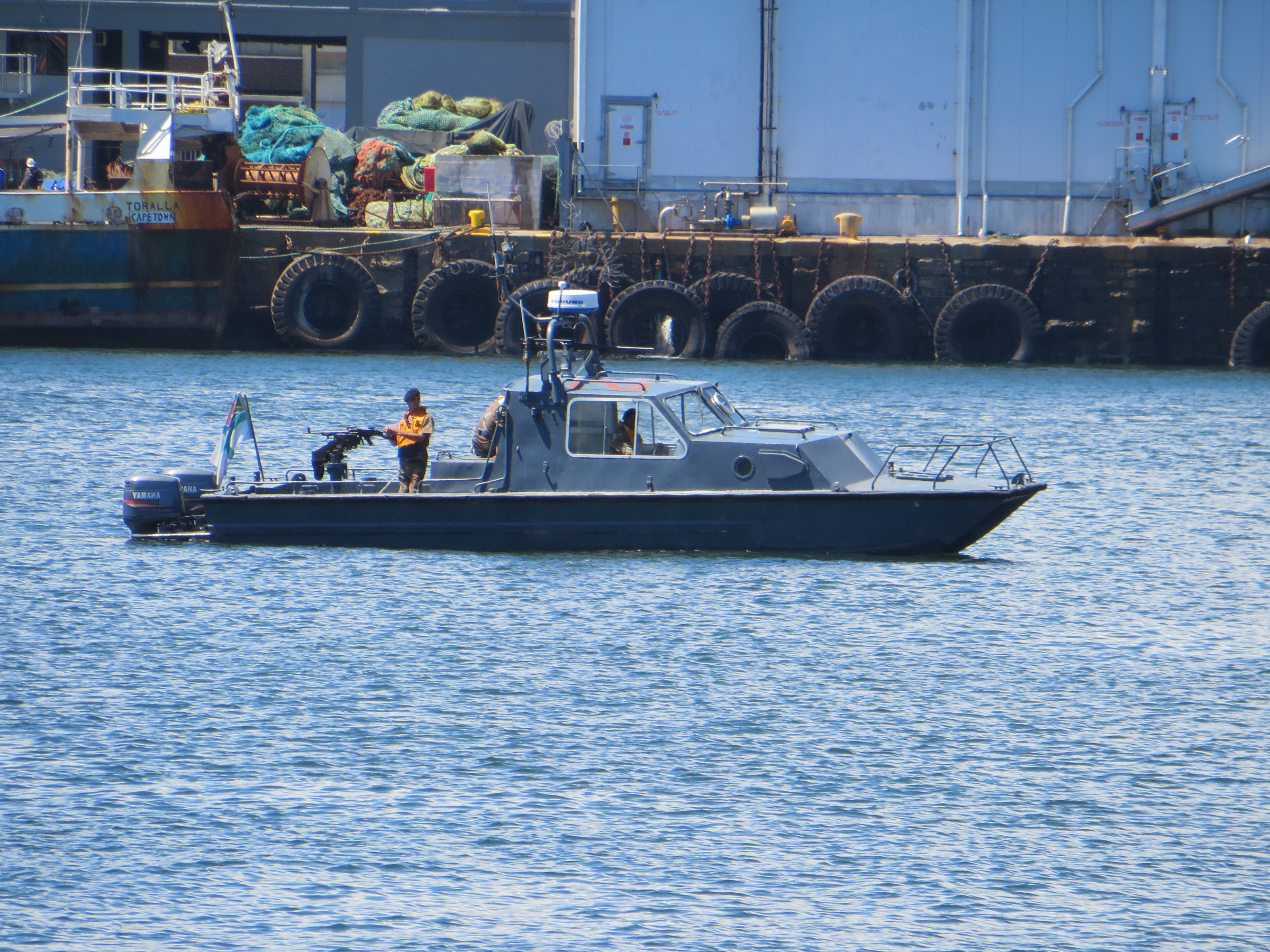
Namacurra harbour patrol boat

=== Establishment and training ===
The initial officer cadre of the brigade was drawn from South African infantry units as well as a number of officers from the Rhodesian forces. Senior NCO's were selected from the South African Navy and Rhodesian Light Infantry squadrons. Officers were required to complete all SADF infantry training courses as well as specialised navy training courses for promotional purposes. Recruit training focused on regimental training as well as conventional warfare, which was then followed by rural counterinsurgency operations. After this training, some recruits moved into specialist fields whilst the majority were posted on a rotational basis to naval units and to operational deployments in South-West Africa. Advanced training was carried out with 44 Parachute Brigade for conventional amphibious operations, with 4 Reconnaissance Regiment (See South African Special Forces Brigade) for small tactics amphibious operations and with 1 Reconnaissance Regiment in Durban for advanced urban counter-insurgency operations. Forward Observation Officer / Fire control training, involving directing ship's artillery fire onto enemy position targets from within enemy territory, was also regularly conducted with naval strike craft in northern Zululand. Brigade staff members were responsible for defining SADF amphibious warfare doctrine.

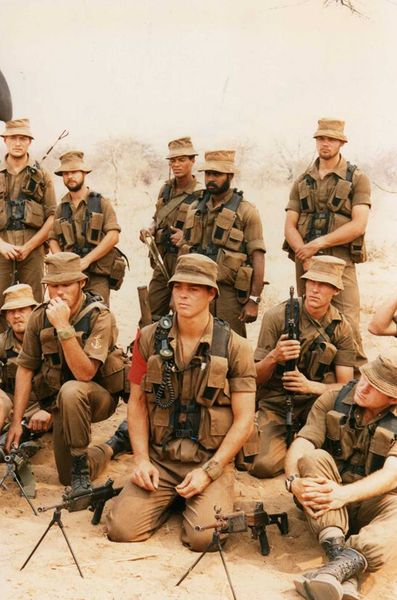
South African Marines being briefed prior to a patrol on the Caprivi / Zambia border in 1984

=== Amphibious operations ===
Together with the SA Navy and 44 Parachute Brigade, the Marines demonstrated their capability during a small amphibious exercise held during the negotiations on Angola and Namibia – Exercise "Magersfontein", in Walvis Bay in September / October 1988. It was referred to by senior Cuban officers as having convinced them that "the South Africans were serious" and certainly influenced the negotiations.

=== Bush War operations ===
Operations included deployments to Sector 10 in central Owambo for counter insurgency operations as well as deployment in support of SADF and SWATF units during Operation Daisy in November 1981 and later SADF raids into southern Angola. Subsequently, the Marines were withdrawn from Section 10 and re-deployed to Sector 70 in the north east of South-West Africa, where deployments were made from Wenela in the eastern Caprivi covering a 50 km land border with Zambia to the west and 200 km of riverine border to the east. The Marines occupied the most easterly point of South-West Africa – Impalila island at the confluence of the Zambezi and Chobe rivers, observing and photographing vehicle traffic crossing the Zambezi on the Kazungula ferry. The base is now utilised as Naval Base Impalila after it has been refurbished by the Namibian Navy.

=== Dress and equipment ===
Marine combat dress comprised a black beret, web belt and boots, worn with nutria brown fatigues. Early marines were distinguished by being issued with the H&K G3 7.62 LAR as opposed to the traditional FN FAL used by the SADF. The G3s were later replaced by the SADF standard R4 assault rifle and later R5s.

=== Disbanded ===
The South African Marines were disbanded on 18 January 1990, following a major restructuring of the Navy at the end of the South African Border War.

== Maritime Reaction Squadron ==
After the integration of the South African National Defence Force the Navy was increasingly called on to assist with peacekeeping operations. Realising that this situation would continue, the then Chief of the Navy Refiloe Johannes Mudimu, decided to create this capability by creating a Naval Rapid Deployment Force. An Operational Boat Squadron was formed in 2006 to ensure that South Africa could commit meaningfully to the peacekeeping at the Great Lakes.

The Rapid Deployment Force became the Maritime Reaction Squadron on 1 September 2006.
