= Naval Base Capt (N) P.N. Sacharia =

Namibian Navy installation

- Near Walvis Bay in Namibia

Site information
- Type: Naval base
- Owner: Ministry of Defence (Namibia)
- Operator: Namibian Navy
- Controlled by: Namibian Defence Force
- Condition: Active

Location
- Coordinates: 22°55′37″S 14°31′13″E

Site history
- Built: 2002

Garrison information
- Current commander: Capt (N) Paulinus Nuuyoma
- Past commanders: Sinsy Nghipandua

Naval Base Capt (N) P.N. Sacharia is the Namibian Navy's largest naval base, situated at Walvis Bay. The base provides naval support functions to the Namibian Navy and hosts the Navy Command.

== History ==
In 1998 following the first graduation of the Namibian Navy Pioneer officers in Brazil, the site, north of the port of Walvis Bay identified as a potential Naval Base. After the ministry of Defence bought the piece of land, construction then started of the facility in 2002. In 2011 the construction of the 200 meter long jetty commenced and was completed afterwards.

The Base was commissioned in 2012 by president Hifikepunye Pohamba. A bust of Capt (N) Sacharia stands and the gate of the Base and is dedicated to Sailors that have passed on in the line of duty. At this occasion the NS Elephant and jetty were commissioned as well. Dredging of the seabed was done to seven meters.

== Current status ==
The base is the homeport of the Navy fleet. It also currently hosts the Navy headquarters, the Navy operations headquarters and Navy support headquarters and fleet headquarters. All change-of-Navy-command parades are held here.

== Namesake ==
The Base is named after Captain (N) Phestus Sacharia, the first maritime wing commander. Sacharia was the commander of the first group of core officers that went for training to Brazil.

== Commandants ==
Naval Base Capt (N) P.N. Sacharia
From	Commandant	To	Ribbon
2005	Capt (N) Sinsy Nghipandua (Note: Later Rear Admiral)	2009	
2009	Capt (N) Richard Kopano	31 October 2017	
24 February 2023	Capt (N) Paulinus Nuuyoma	incumbent	
