= Alweendo Amungulu =

Namibian military officer

Alweendo Paulus Amungulu
- Born: 16 December 1963 (age 62); Okafitu ka Kahala, Ombalantu
- Military career
- Allegiance: Namibia
- Branch: PLAN; Namibian Army; Namibian Navy
- Service years: 1987 – 2024 (37 years, 6 months)
- Rank: Rear Admiral
- Commands: Navy Commander (2020-2024) Commander Naval Operations (2017-2020) Commander Naval Support (2010-2017) NS Lt Gen Dimo Hamaambo
- Conflicts: Namibian War of Independence

Rear Admiral Alweendo Paulus Amungulu is a retired Namibian military officer who served as the Commander of the Namibian Navy. He was appointed the Commander of the Namibian Navy in September 2020. Prior to that he served as Commander of Naval Operations (CNO) with the rank of Rear Admiral (JG).

== Career ==
=== Exile ===
Admiral Amungulu joined SWAPO in Angola in 1979 where he undertook his Secondary schooling in Kwanza Sul at the Namibia Education Centre. Between 1981 and 1984 he trained in the German Democratic Republic and earned his diploma in Auto mechanics and deployed as a mechanic at a SWAPO transit camp at Viana outside Luanda, Angola. In 1985 he was appointed as the Road construction secretary at Kwaza Sul. He would join the People's Liberation Army of Namibia under SWAPO in 1987 and received military training at the Tobias Hainyeko training centre in Lubango, Angola and specialized as a signaler.

=== NDF career ===
Rear Admiral Amungulu's career in the Namibian Defence Force started in 1990 as a corporal in the policy, plans and operations department as a Field Intelligence Operative Officer, he would then after be promoted to the rank of lieutenant. In 1995 he was part of the first group of ten Army officers sent to Brazil as Naval Pioneers led by Phestus Sacharia and consisted of officers such as Peter Vilho and Sinsy Nghipandua. He obtained a Diploma in Naval Science in 1998 upon completion of his studies, he was then promoted to the rank of Navy Lieutenant and later promoted to Commander until 2010. At the commissioning of the Namibian Defence Force Maritime Wing in 1998 he was appointed as the Chief of Staff Intelligence. In 2004 the Brazilian Navy donated the corvette Purrus to Namibia and Amungulu was appointed as the first Captain of the NS Lt Gen Dimo Hamaambo with the rank of Lieutenant Commander. In 2010 he was appointed as the Chief of Staff Naval Support with the rank of naval captain. Amungulu achieved flag officer status in 2015 when he was promoted to rear admiral (JG) . In September 2017 following the promotion and Appointment of Admiral Nghipandua as Navy Commander, Amungulu was appointed as Commander Naval Operations and in this position he represented Namibia in military exercises such as Obangame Express multinational maritime exercise in 2018. Between September 2019 and July 2020 he attended the International College of Defence Studies of PLA National Defence University. In September 2020 he rose to the rank of Rear Admiral and appointed as Navy Commander. He retired in December 2024 after more than 37 years in uniform being succeed by Rear Admiral !Gonteb.

=== Qualifications ===
- Certificate of Staff Method and Instructor from the South African Naval Staff College
- Certificate of Advance Intelligence from the South African Defence Intelligence College
- Certificate of Quality Assurance on Fiber Technology and Inspections from the South African Bureau of Standards
- Diploma in Auto Mechanics GDR
- Diploma in Naval Science, Brazil
- National Diploma: Joint and Multi-National Operations from the Tshwane University of Technology, South Africa
- Advanced Diploma in Defence and Strategic Studies from the PLA National Defence University, China.

=== Military Decorations ===
- Namibian Army Pioneer Medal
- Naval Pioneers Medal
- Ten Year Service Medal
- Meritorious Medal “First Class”
- The Southern Cross Medal
- Captain (Navy) Sacharia Medal
- Namibian Navy Pioneer Medal,
- 250 Sea Days Medal,
- Gold Star Medal
- Silver Star Medal
- Namibian Navy Achievement Medal
- Tamandaré Medal (Brazilian Navy)
- Naval Merit Order Medal(Brazilian Navy)

Military offices
Preceded by Rear Admiral Sinsy Nghipandua	Namibian Navy Commander; 2017 – Incumbent	Incumbent
Preceded by Rear Admiral Sinsy Nghipandua	Commander Naval Operations; 2017 – 2020	Succeeded by Sacheus !Gonteb
