= NS Daures =

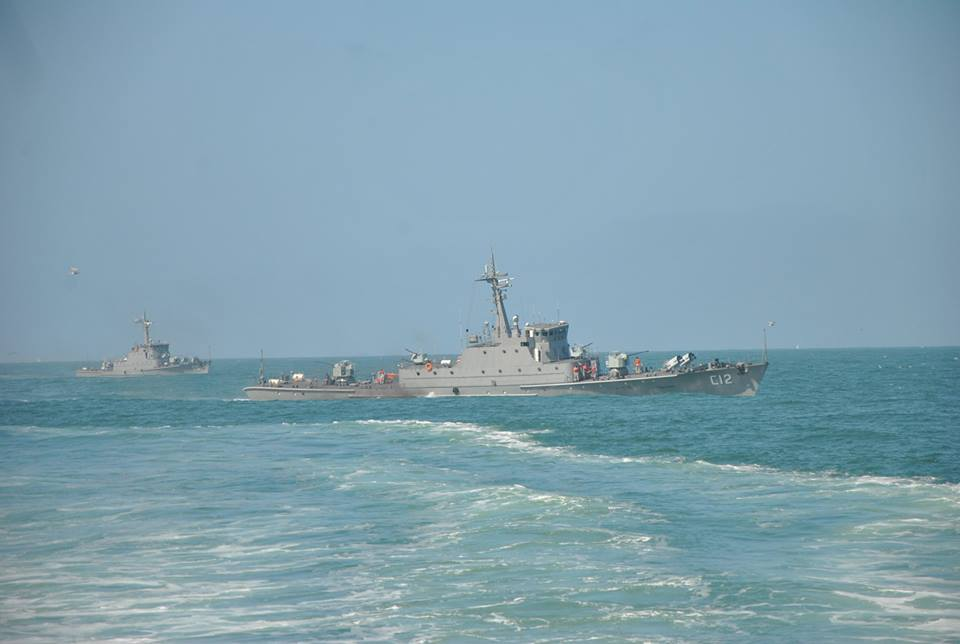
- NS Daures in the foreground

History

Namibia
- Name: Daures
- Namesake: Daures
- Recommissioned: 27 October 2017
- Home port: Walvis Bay
- Status: in active service

General characteristics
- Class & type: Haiqing-class patrol boat
- Displacement: 478 tonnes (470 long tons)
- Length: 62.8 m (206 ft 0 in)
- Beam: 7.2 m (23 ft 7 in)
- Draught: 2.4 m (7 ft 10 in)
- Installed power: 4 × Chinese PR 230ZC diesel engines; 4,000 hp (2,983 kW)
- Propulsion: 4 shafts
- Speed: 28 knots (52 km/h; 32 mph)
- Range: 1,300 nmi (2,400 km) at 15 kn (28 km/h)
- Boats & landing craft carried: 2 Rigid-hulled inflatable boats
- Complement: 71
- Sensors & processing systems: 1 × Type 723 surface search radar; Chinese copy of French Thomson-Sintra medium frequency SS-12 VDS sonar
- Armament: 2 × 37 mm gun (2 × 1); 2 × Type 69 14.5 mm heavy machine guns (2 × 2); 2 × Type 87 6-tubed ASW mortar

NS Daures (C12) is a patrol boat of the Namibian Navy and sister ship of NS Brukkaros. Formerly a People's Liberation Army Navy Haiqing-class submarine chaser, it was commissioned on 27 October 2017 into the Namibian Navy. The vessel is used to patrol Namibia's exclusive economic zone.

Current CO/ Captain CDR Muzamayi Simasiku

Current Boatswain/ Ship Master Chief Emmanuel Samuel

== Description ==
The Haiqing class are a follow-on class of submarine chasers to the preceding Type 037 submarine chasers of the People's Liberation Army Navy. The ship is armed with two 6-tubed anti-submarine mortar launchers. It is also armed with two 37 mm guns. It served in the PLA Navy as Wanning (hull 786) before being decommissioned on the 3 June 2016 at a Naval port in China's Hainan province.

== Operational history ==
The boat was previously a PLA Navy ship. In 2014 the Chinese government offered to donate it to the Namibian Navy. The patrol boat was then refurbished by Poly Technologies after which Namibian crews went to China for training on the ship. The ship was then sent to Namibia on the deck of the cargo ship Da Qing and arrived in Namibia on 9 July 2017.

The ship is named after Daures Constituency in Erongo Region and was commissioned into the Namibian Navy on 27 October 2017 by President Hage Geingob. The ship is operationally utilised for general exclusive economic zone management.
