= NS Brendan Simbwaye =

History

Namibia
- Name: Brendan Simbwaye
- Namesake: Brendan Simbwaye
- Builder: INACE
- Laid down: 25 February 2005
- Launched: 1 May 2008
- Commissioned: 16 January 2009
- Home port: Walvis Bay
- Identification: MMSI number: 659357000; Callsign: V5SB
- Status: in active service

General characteristics
- Class & type: Grajaú-class patrol boat
- Displacement: 263 long tons (267 t) full load
- Length: 46.5 m (152 ft 7 in)
- Beam: 7.5 m (24 ft 7 in)
- Draught: 2.3 m (7 ft 7 in)
- Installed power: 2 × MTU 16V 396 TB94 diesel engines; 5,800 hp (4,300 kW)
- Propulsion: 2 shafts
- Speed: 26 knots (48 km/h; 30 mph)
- Range: 2,200 nmi (4,100 km; 2,500 mi) at 12 knots (22 km/h; 14 mph)
- Complement: 29
- Sensors & processing systems: Decca 1290A surface search radar; Global Maritime Distress Safety System
- Armament: 1 × Bofors L/70 40 mm cannon; 2 × Oerlikon 20 mm cannon

Namibian Ship (NS) Brendan Simbwaye (P11) is a patrol boat of the Namibian Navy. Constructed and launched in Brazil, it was commissioned into the Namibian Navy in 2009. Its design was based on the Brazilian Navy's Grajaú-class patrol boats. The vessel is used for patrolling Namibia's exclusive economic zone.

== Description ==
Based on the Brazilian Navy's Grajaú-class patrol boat design, the ship has a full load displacement of 263 long tons (267 t) and measures 46.5 m (152 ft 7 in) long with a beam of 7.5 m (24 ft 7 in) and a draught of 7.5 m (24 ft 7 in). The vessel is powered by two MTU 16V 396 TB94 diesel engines rated at 5,800 horsepower (4,300 kW) driving two shafts. This gives the vessel a maximum speed of 26 knots (48 km/h; 30 mph) and a range of 2,200 nmi (4,100 km; 2,500 mi) at 12 knots (22 km/h; 14 mph).

The vessel is armed one Bofors L/70 40 mm cannon and two Oerlikon 20 mm cannon. Brendan Simbwaye is equipped with Decca 1290A surface search radar. The patrol boat has a complement of 29 including four officers.

== Operational history ==
In 2003, Namibia and Brazil entered into an agreement whereby Brazil would construct a patrol boat for Namibia based on its Grajaú class. The vessel was built by INACE at Fortaleza and was laid down on 25 February 2005. Named for Brendan Simbwaye, the patrol boat was launched on 1 May 2008 and commissioned on 16 January 2009 at Fortaleza. The ship then set sail to Namibia on 31 March 2009 and arrived in Walvis Bay 22 days later under the stewarship of its then Commanding Officer Lieutenant Commander Sacheus !Gonteb. During its maiden voyage to Namibia it was accompanied by the Brazilian Navy corvette Caboclo and made stops at Ascension Island and Saint Helena. The ship is operationally utilised for general exclusive economic zone management. The boat participated in the Southern African Development Community maritime exercise code named Golfinho in 2009.
