= Naval Base Lieutenant General John Sinvula Mutwa =

- Near Katima Mulilo in Namibia

Site information
- Type: Naval base
- Owner: Ministry of Defence (Namibia)
- Operator: Namibian Navy
- Controlled by: Namibian Defence Force
- Condition: Active

Garrison information
- Current commander: Commander

Naval Base Lieutenant General John Sinvula Mutwa is a riverine base of the Namibian Navy. It is located on Impalila Island at the confluence of the Zambezi and Chobe rivers.

== History ==
The base was originally constructed by the South African Defence Force and used by the South African Marine Corps. It was abandoned in 1989 during South Africa's withdrawal from Namibia. After Namibia's independence it was used as a secondary school. In 2011 the Namibian Navy conducted a Navy Coastal-land, Riverine and Meteorological survey, which found critical security gaps. The report led to the creation of the naval district in the Zambezi region covering Zambezi, Chobe and Okavango rivers. Rehabilitation of the base began in 2014 and was completed in 2017. On 21 June 2019 Naval Base Impalila was commissioned into service. In March 2024 it was renamed in honour of the former Chief of Defence Lieutenant General John Mutwa.

== Current status ==
The base was commissioned into service by the Minister of Defence Penda ya Ndakolo on 21 June 2019. A Namibian Marine Corps Operational Boat Team is permanently stationed at the base and conducts riverine patrols.

== Commandants ==
Naval Base Lieutenant General John Sinvula Mutwa
From	Commandant	To	Ribbon
21 June 2019	Commander Christian Keendjele	Unknown	
