= Grajaú-class patrol boat =

Class of patrol boats of the Brazilian Navy

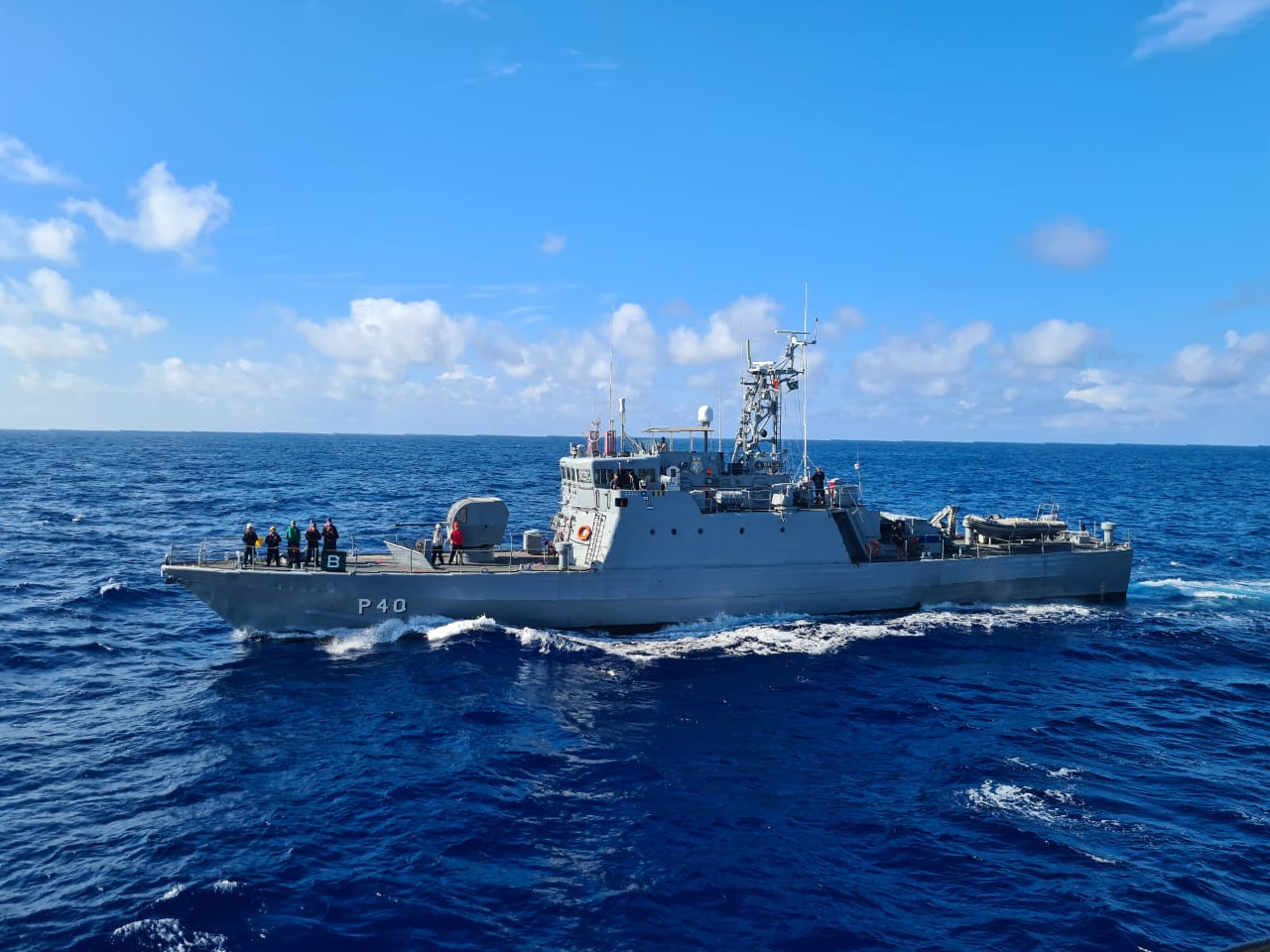
- Grajaú

Class overview
- Name: Grajaú class
- Builders: AMRJ, Estaleiro Mauá, Peene-Werft, INACE
- Operators: Brazilian Navy; Namibian Navy
- Succeeded by: Macaé class
- In commission: 1993-present
- Building: 1993-2009
- Completed: 13 (1 Namibian Navy)
- Active: 13 (1 Namibian Navy)

General characteristics
- Type: Patrol vessel
- Displacement: 197 tons standard, 217 tons full load
- Length: 46.5 m (152 ft 7 in)
- Beam: 7.5 m (24 ft 7 in)
- Draught: 2.3 m (7 ft 7 in)
- Installed power: 2 × 2,740 hp (2,040 kW)
- Propulsion: 2 MTU 16V 396 TB94 diesel engines
- Speed: 26.5 knots (49.1 km/h; 30.5 mph)
- Range: 2,200 nmi (4,100 km; 2,500 mi) at 12 knots (22 km/h; 14 mph)
- Boats & landing craft carried: 2 × Rigid-hulled inflatable boat
- Complement: 31
- Crew: 29
- Sensors & processing systems: Decca 1290A, equipped with Global Maritime Distress Safety System and night vision
- Armament: 1 Bofors L/70 40 mm cannon; 2 Oerlikon 20 mm cannon

The Grajaú class is a class of patrol boats of the Brazilian Navy. Grajaú was the first of twelve Grajaú-class patrol boats ordered by the Brazilian Navy in September 1990. Grajaú was launched on 21 May 1993, and was commissioned on 1 December 1993.

== History ==
In June 2009, NPa Grajaú participated in the recovery mission of the wreckage of Air France Flight 447.

== Ships ==
Boat	No.	Comm	Displacement	Type	Origin	N.B.
Grajaú	P40	1993	200 tonnes	Offshore patrol vessel	Brazil	
Guaíba	P41		200 tonnes	Offshore patrol vessel	Brazil	
Graúna	P42		200 tonnes	Offshore patrol vessel	Brazil	
Goiana	P43		200 tonnes	Offshore patrol vessel	Brazil	
Guajará	P44		200 tonnes	Offshore patrol vessel	Brazil	
Guaporé	P45		200 tonnes	Offshore patrol vessel	Brazil	
Gurupá	P46		200 tonnes	Offshore patrol vessel	Brazil	
Gurupi	P47		200 tonnes	Offshore patrol vessel	Brazil	
Guanabara	P48		200 tonnes	Offshore patrol vessel	Brazil	
Guarujá	P49		200 tonnes	Offshore patrol vessel	Brazil	
Guaratuba	P50		200 tonnes	Offshore patrol vessel	Brazil	
Gravataí	P51		200 tonnes	Offshore patrol vessel	Brazil	
Brendan Simbwaye	P11	2009	200 tonnes	Offshore patrol vessel	Brazil	Operated by Namibian Navy
