= NS Lt Gen Dimo Hamaambo =

Corvette used in the Brazilian and Namibian navies

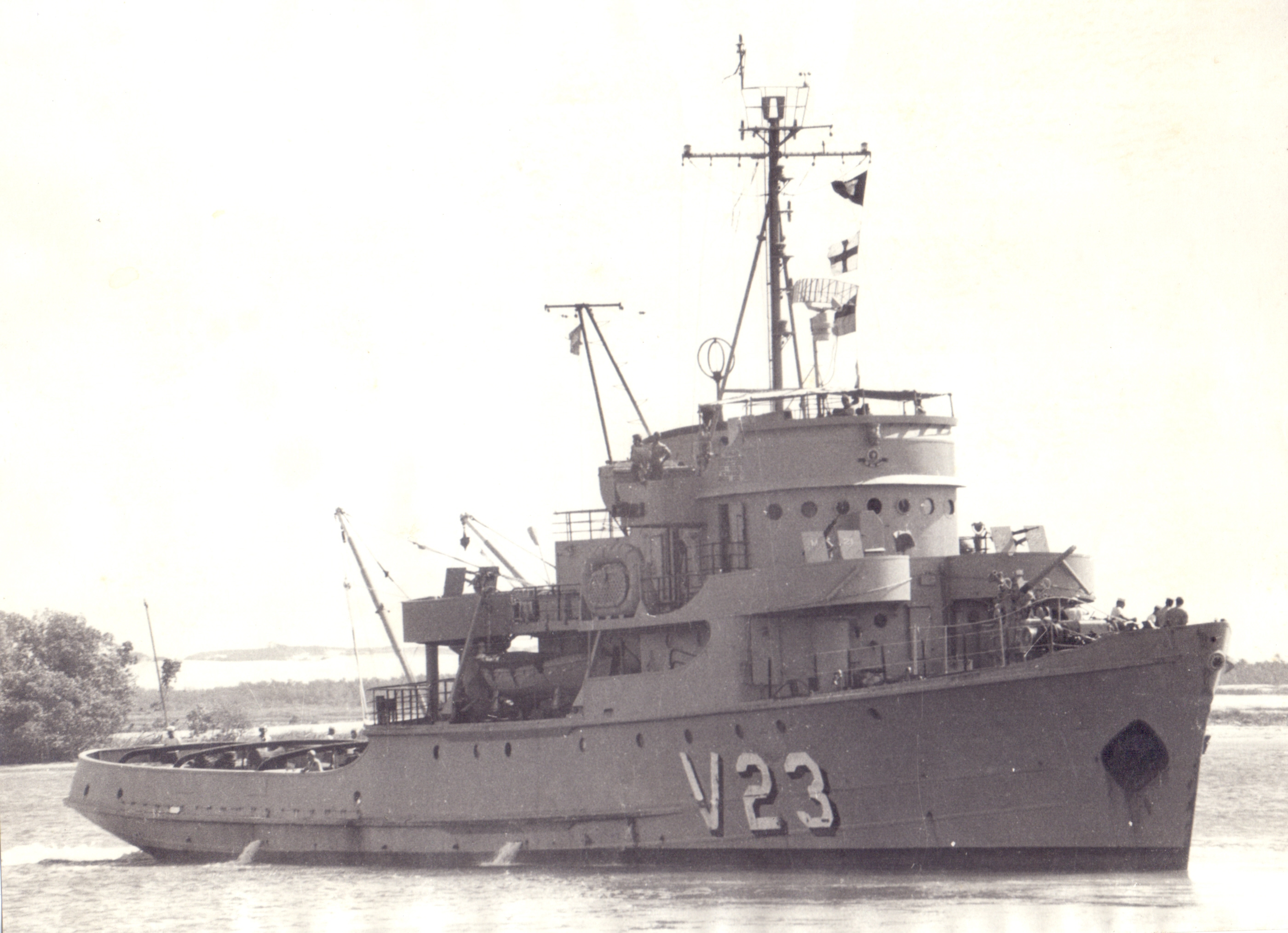
- Lt Gen Dimo Hamaambo while she was in service with the Brazilian Navy as Purus

History

Brazil
- Name: Purus
- Builder: Bodewes Scheepswerf
- Launched: 6 November 1954
- Commissioned: 4 July 1955
- Decommissioned: 18 October 2002
- Fate: Transferred to Namibia

Namibia
- Name: Lt Gen Dimo Hamaambo
- Namesake: Dimo Hamaambo
- Acquired: 5 June 2003
- Recommissioned: 25 June 2004
- Decommissioned: 12 August 2012
- Fate: Scrapped 2012

General characteristics
- Class & type: Imperial Marinheiro-class corvette
- Displacement: 911 tons standard, 1,025 tons full load
- Length: 55.72 m (182 ft 10 in)
- Beam: 9.55 m (31 ft 4 in)
- Draught: 3.6 m (11 ft 10 in)
- Ice class: 1A
- Propulsion: 2 Sulzer 6TD36 1,080 hp (810 kW)
- Speed: 18 knots (33 km/h; 21 mph)
- Range: 19,000 nmi (35,000 km; 22,000 mi)
- Complement: 64
- Armament: 1 × 3-inch/50-caliber gun; 4 × Oerlikon 20 mm cannon

NS Lt Gen Dimo Hamaambo (C11) was an Imperial Marinheiro-class corvette of the Namibian Navy. Originally built for the Brazilian Navy as Purus. Purus was part of ten ships of the class ordered by the Brazilian Navy in 1953. Purus was laid down on 20 November 1953, launched on 6 November 1954, and commissioned on 4 July 1955.

== Brazilian service ==
It spent 48 years in service with the Brazilian Navy before it was decommissioned on 18 October 2002. During this time it spent 2,092 days at sea and sailed 49,4318.4 miles. On 5 June 2003 its transfer to Namibia was authorized by Law No. 10,685 (DOU 06/06/2003).

== Namibian service ==
On 25 June 2004, the transfer ceremony of the corvette Purus to the Namibian Navy took place in the city of Salvador, Brazil. Namibia was represented by Minister of Defence Erkki Nghimtina and Navy Commander Peter Vilho and Brazil was represented by Jose Viegas Filho, Minister of Defence. The ship was rechristened as Lt Gen Dimo Hamaambo at the ceremony, named after Lieutenant General Dimo Hamaambo the First Namibian Chief of Defence Force. General Hamaambo was Chief of Defence between 1990 and 2000, a period in which the formative steps were taken to establish the Maritime wing of the Namibian Military. At the Aratu Naval Base, the ship was then refurbished focusing on accommodation, machinery, electronic and communication equipment.

The Namibian crew led by its commanding officer Commander Alweendo Amungulu first embarked on 15 June 2004 sailing out to sea the same afternoon. On 6 August 2004, the ship set sail for Walvis Bay. On 10 August the ship suffered a fire in the funnel which was promptly put out. Lt Gen Dimo Hamaambo arrived on 25 August after a 19-day voyage. In Namibian service, it was utilized in the coastal patrol role. The ship was decommissioned 12 August 2012 by President Hifikepunye Pohamba. It was revealed during the decommissioning ceremony that it was intended to be at sea for only two years before mid life upgrades for the hull structure, piping and wiring system and to the main and auxiliary engines had to be undertaken which could not happen due to financial constraints. During it service with Namibia the corvette spent 24 days at sea covering 5,127 miles.
