= NS Möwe Bay =

Harbour patrol boat of the Namibian Navy

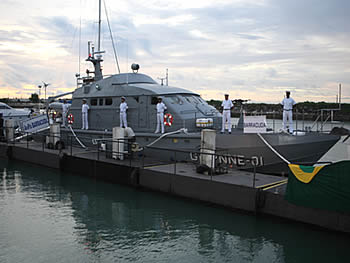
- Marlim sister ship of the Möwe Bay

History

Namibia
- Name: Möwe Bay
- Namesake: Möwe Bay
- Builder: INACE
- Laid down: 2009
- Commissioned: 2010
- Home port: Walvis Bay
- Status: in active service

General characteristics
- Displacement: 45.15 long tons (45.87 t) full load
- Length: 22.80 m (74 ft 10 in)
- Beam: 5.50 m (18 ft 1 in)
- Draught: 1.6 m (5 ft 3 in)
- Installed power: 2 × MTU 8V 2000 M92 diesel engines; 1,000 hp (750 kW)
- Propulsion: 2 shafts
- Speed: 25 knots (46 km/h; 29 mph)
- Range: 850 nmi (1,570 km; 980 mi) at 15 knots (28 km/h; 17 mph)
- Complement: 8
- Armament: 1 × Oerlikon 20 mm cannon

Möwe Bay (HPB21) is a harbour patrol boat of the Namibian Navy. Constructed and launched in Brazil, it was commissioned into the Namibian Navy in 2010. Its design is based on the Brazilian Navy's Marlim class. The vessel is used for patrolling Namibia's Harbours.

== Description ==
Based on the Brazilian Navy's Marlim design, the ship has a full load displacement of 45.15 long tons (45.87 t) and measures 22.80 m (74 ft 10 in) long with a beam of 5.5 m (18 ft 1 in) and a draught of 1.6 m (5 ft 3 in). The vessel is powered by two MTU 8V 2000 M92 diesel engines rated at 1,000 horsepower (750 kW) driving two shafts. This gives the vessel a maximum speed of 25 knots (46 km/h; 29 mph) and a range of 850 nmi (1,570 km; 980 mi) at 15 knots (28 km/h; 17 mph).

The vessel is armed with one Oerlikon 20 mm cannon. The patrol boat has a complement of 8 including two officers.

== Operational history ==
The boat is utilised by the Namibian Navy for policing harbours, Coastal search and rescue, anti smuggling operations and illegal fishing patrols
