= Impalila =

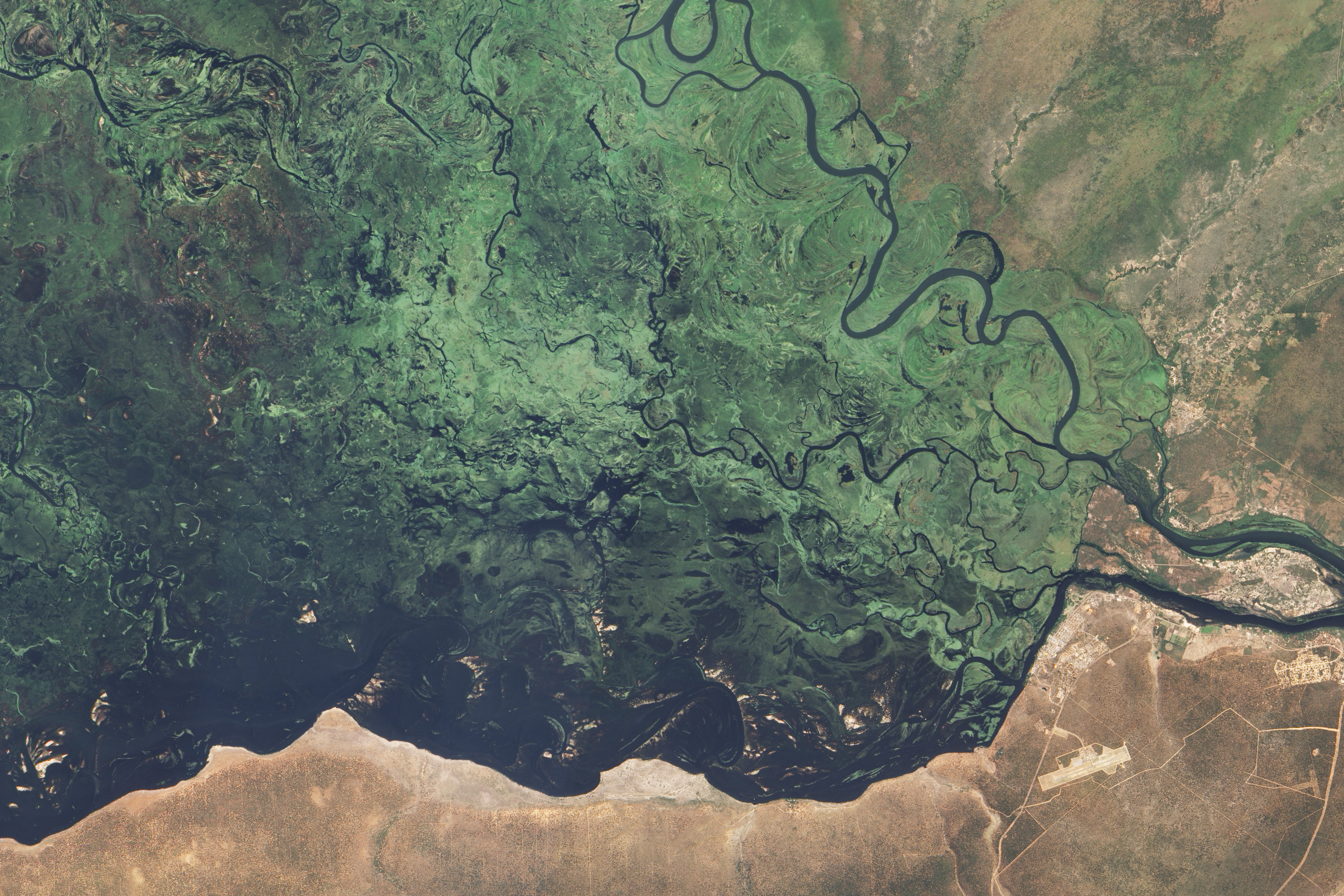
- May 2010 satellite view of the Zambezi floodplain, west of the Zambezi-Chobe confluency, showing Impalila Island on the right edge of the picture.

- Location within Namibia

Geography
- Coordinates: 17°47′00″S 25°13′24″E

Demographics
- Population: 2500-3000

Impalila (sometimes spelt Mpalila) is an island in the Zambezi Region, the far eastern tip of Namibia, bounded on the north by the waters of the Zambezi river and on the south by the Chobe River. It is home to some 2500–3000 mainly Tswana (from Botswana) and Subia people (from Namibia) in 25 small villages. The largest settlement on the island is Kafubu.

Impalila island is completely cut off from Namibian road infrastructure. It can only be reached by boat. Most residents use the Botswana–Namibia border crossing on the island and buy groceries in Botswana. As a result, inhabitants on Impalila use the Botswana pula as their main currency instead of the Namibian dollar. They are also subject to import duty on their shopping.

There is an air strip with a 1,300 metre runway, used for charter flights to bring tourists to the various lodges on the island. The airport is a relic of a military base used in the 1980s by the South African Defence Forces, strategically positioned within sight of Botswana, Zambia and Zimbabwe. The Namibian Navy has refurbished the Naval Base Impalila, which is now operated by the Namibian Marine Corps.
