= Kafubu =

Kafubu may refer to:

- Kafubu, Namibia, village in Namibia
- Kafubu Stadium, stadium in Luanshya, Zambia
- Kafubu (bug), a genus of shield bugs in the subfamily Phyllocephalinae
