= Phestus Sacharia =

Namibian military officer

Phestus Nopoudjuu Sacharia
- Born: 12 October 1956; Namibia
- Died: July 12, 2002 (aged 45)
- Military career
- Allegiance: Namibia
- Branch: Namibian Navy
- Service years: 1975-2002
- Rank: Captain(N)
- Commands: NDF Maritime Wing (1998-2002)

Captain (Naval) Phestus Nopoudjuu Sacharia (1956 - 2002) was a Namibian military officer who is served as the Commander of the Namibian Defence Force Maritime Wing the forerunner to the Namibian Navy. He was appointed the Commander of the Maritime Wing in 1998.

== Career ==
=== Exile ===
Sacharia joined People's Liberation Army of Namibia under SWAPO in exile in 1975 as a 19 year old teenager and served in various Capacities and returned to Namibia in 1991.

=== NDF career ===
Sacharia's career in the Namibian Defence Force started in 1991 when he and the last PLAN Combatant group arrived in Namibia. After Namibia's independence when he was appointed as a He was appointed as a Major in the Namibian Army. In 1994 he was appointed as the commander of the First group of ten Army officers sent to Brazil for training as Naval Officers. This group consisting of officers such as Peter Vilho, Sinsy Nghipandua graduated in 1998 from the Admiral Wandenkolk Naval Officers Formative School. Being commander of that group he was then Appointed as the first Commander of the Namibian Defence Force Maritime Wing in 1998 at this occasion he was promoted to the rank of Naval Captain, he held this position until his death in 2002. In 2012 the new Naval Base North of Walvis Bay was named in his honour. It is official known as the Naval Base Capt (N) P.N. Sacharia.

=== Qualifications ===
- Naval Officers Formative Course in Brazil

=== Military Decorations ===
- Namibian Army Pioneer Medal
- Naval Pioneers Medal

Military offices
Preceded by Vacant	Namibian Defence Force Maritime Wing Commander; 1998 – 2002	Succeeded by Peter Vilho
