= Namibian Marine Corps =

Combat body created in 2016

- Active: 22 July 2016 – present (9 years, 11 months)
- Country: Namibia
- Type: Marines
- Part of: Namibian Navy
- Garrison/HQ: Walvis Bay, Namibia

Commanders
- Commander-In-Chief: Nangolo Mbumba
- Minister of Defence: Frans Kapofi
- Namibian Navy Commander: Rear Admiral Sacheus !Gonteb
- Commandant: Captain Olavi Shipunda

The Namibian Marines Corps are the marines of Namibia and part of the Namibian Navy and the overall Namibian Defence Force.

== History ==
The Marine Corps are a recent addition to the Namibian Defence Force due to the gradual establishment of the Namibian Navy. The first Marines were trained in Brazil in 2005. The Marine Commandant is subordinate to the Commander of the Namibian Navy. The current Marine Corps Commandant is Captain Olavi Shipunda.

== Training ==
Aspirant Marines are trained in Namibia by a combination of Namibian instructors and the Brazilian Military Advisory Team (BRAZMATT) based in Walvis Bay at the Naval Training School. The first course to complete before induction as a marine is the Marines Soldier Formation Course which lasts for five months, after completion of that course induction into the marine corps takes place and the marine is promoted to the rank of able seaman. Marines specializing in infantry are required to complete a six-month infantry specialization course. The year-long Marine Amphibious Commandos Special Operations Course (MACSOC) is the toughest course in the corps and has a one-in-two failure rate.

== Force Structure ==
During the corps' infancy, the Navy Chief of Naval Support indicated that the short-term goal was to have a force consisting of a Marine Corps Infantry Company, Service Support Company, Provost Company, and Brass Band. However due to operation requirements, a Marine Battalion with its own organic rapid Reaction, Operational Boats Unit, and Operational Diving Team were envisioned.

- Rapid Reaction Force
  - Marine Corps Infantry Battalion
  - Service Support Company
  - Provost Company
  - Brass Band
- Amphibious Special Operations Unit
- Operational Boats Unit
- Operational Diving Team

=== Rapid Reaction Force ===
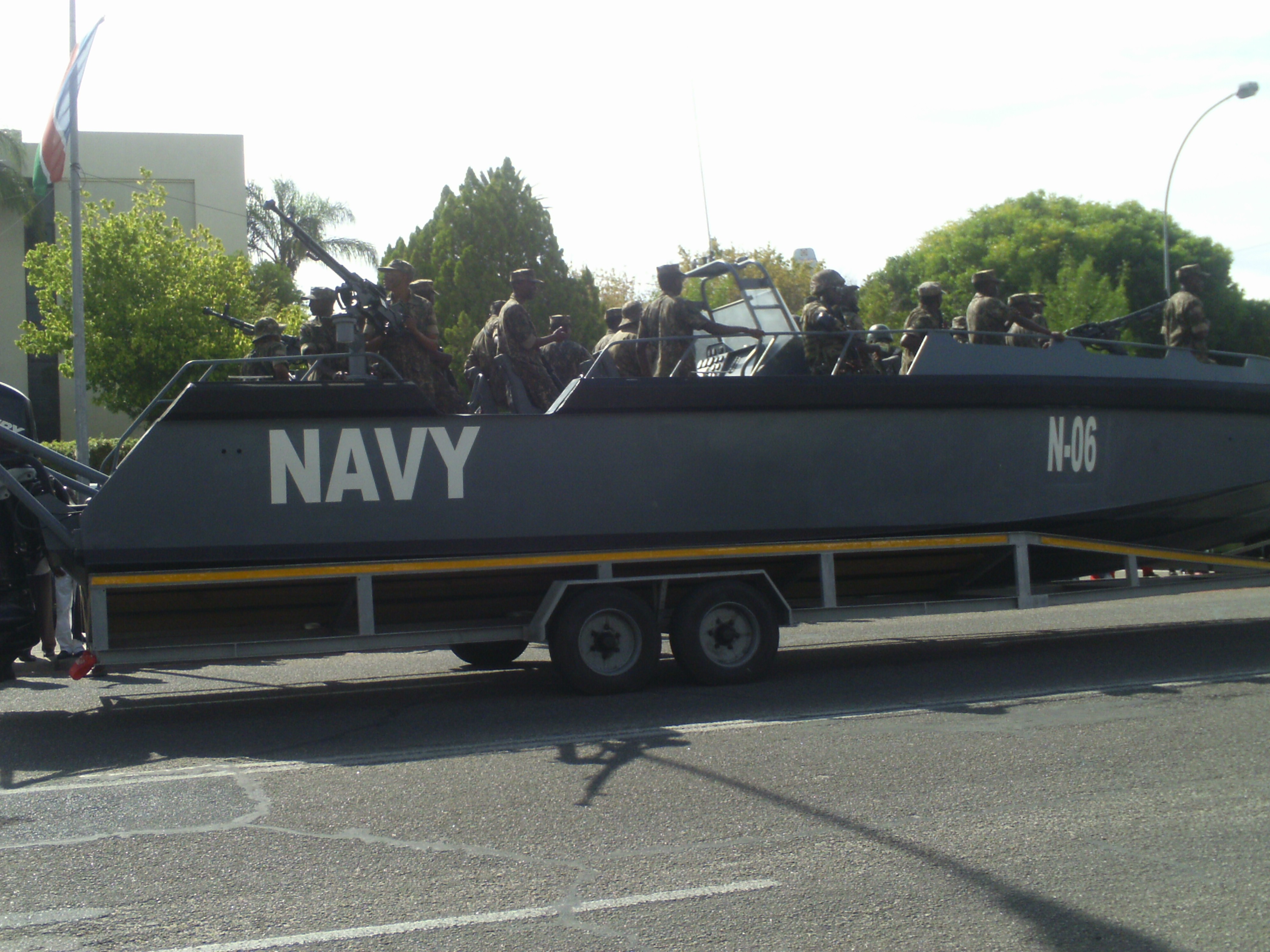
Marines from the Operational Boat Unit on parade in downtown Windhoek on 20 March 2015 during Namibia's Independence celebrations

A marine light infantry unit responsible for protection of static, FOB and naval bases.

==== Marine Corps Infantry Battalion ====
The Marine Corps Infantry Battalion is the unit responsible for undertaking amphibious warfare operations. A full marine battalion has been raised initially from a single company.

==== Service Support Company ====
Service support company provides direct and indirect sustainment services to the Marine Battalion as it conducts operations. Support service offered by the sub-unit includes but not limited to:

- Quartermaster
- Finance
- Medical
- Transportation

==== Provost Company ====
The provost company is responsible for the policing of Navy service personnel.

==== Brass Band ====
The band performs musical duties for military functions and any other apolitical functions for the general public. The band emulates the United States Marine Drum and Bugle Corps and the 5 bands of the Royal Marines Band Service. The Brass Band performs at many important events every year, and is considered an integral part of state funerals, state arrival ceremonies, state dinners, parades, and other social events. Although it is a band in the Namibian Navy, it is a separate unit from the navy's flagship ensemble, the Namibian Navy Band.

=== Amphibious Commandos Unit ===
Provides amphibious warfare and maritime special operations capability to the Navy.The Amphibious Special Operations Unit are trained in Walvis Bay by Brazilian instructors. The amphibious commando basic training course is 12 months after which the successful marine is then given the Operators badge and an Amphibious Commando patched to wear on their left arm. Only existing Marines are eligible for this training.

=== Operational Boat Unit ===
Conduct riverine patrol and naval boarding with small boats particularly in the riverine areas of the Zambezi Region's Zambezi River and Chobe River.

=== Operational Diving Unit ===
It is a clearance diving unit that specializes in the disposal of hazardous materials. Its role varies depending on the situation, with duties ranging from counterterrorism to explosive ordnance disposal.

== Deployments ==
Marines Corps infantry are deployed on Namibian Navy vessels and shore installations.

== Marine Corps equipment ==
=== Rifles ===
Name	Photo	Type	Calibre	Origin
AK-47		Assault rifle	7.62×39mm	Soviet Union
AK-105		Assault rifle	5.45×39mm	Russia
AK-103		Assault rifle	7.62×39mm	Russia
Norinco CQ-A		Assault rifle	5.56×45mm	China

=== Submachine guns ===
Name	Photo	Type	Calibre	Origin
Vityaz-SN		Submachine gun	9×19mm	Russia
FAMAE SAF		Submachine gun	9×19mm	Chile

=== Machine guns ===
Name	Photo	Type	Calibre	Origin
PKP Pecheneg		Machine gun	7.62×54mm	Russia
RPK		Machine gun	7.62×39mm	Soviet Union
Kord machine gun		Machine gun	12.7×108mm	Soviet Union

=== Grenades and grenade launchers ===
Name	Photo	Type	Calibre	Origin
AGS-30		Grenade launcher	30 mm	Russia
GP-34		Grenade launcher	40 mm	Soviet Union

=== Anti-tank weapons ===
Name	Photo	Type	Origin
RPG-7		Grenade launcher	Soviet Union

=== Vehicles ===
- RG-32 Scout South Africa

== Ranks and insignia ==
Marine Corps ranks are based on Commonwealth Navy ranks.

The highest peacetime rank a commissioned officer can attain in the Marine Corps is captain. Career progression in the force for Marine officers is possible well beyond the rank of Navy captain. A Marine officer can be posted outside the Marine unit and progress up the ranks to the singular appointment of Chief of Defence Force. The highest rank an enlisted member can attain is Warrant Officer Class 1, but the highest appointment they can hold is the Namibian Defence Force Sergeant Major.

Commissioned officers

Rank group	General / flag officers	Senior officers			Junior officers
Namibian Marine Corps
Namibian Marine Corps		Marine Commandant	Commander	Lieutenant commander	Lieutenant	Lieutenant (junior grade)	Ensign

Non-commissioned officers/other ranks

Rank group	Senior NCOs				Junior NCOs		Enlisted
Namibian Marine Corps							No insignia
Namibian Marine Corps	Warrant officer class 1	Warrant officer class 2	Chief petty officer	Petty officer	Leading seaman	Able seaman	Seaman

== Gallery ==
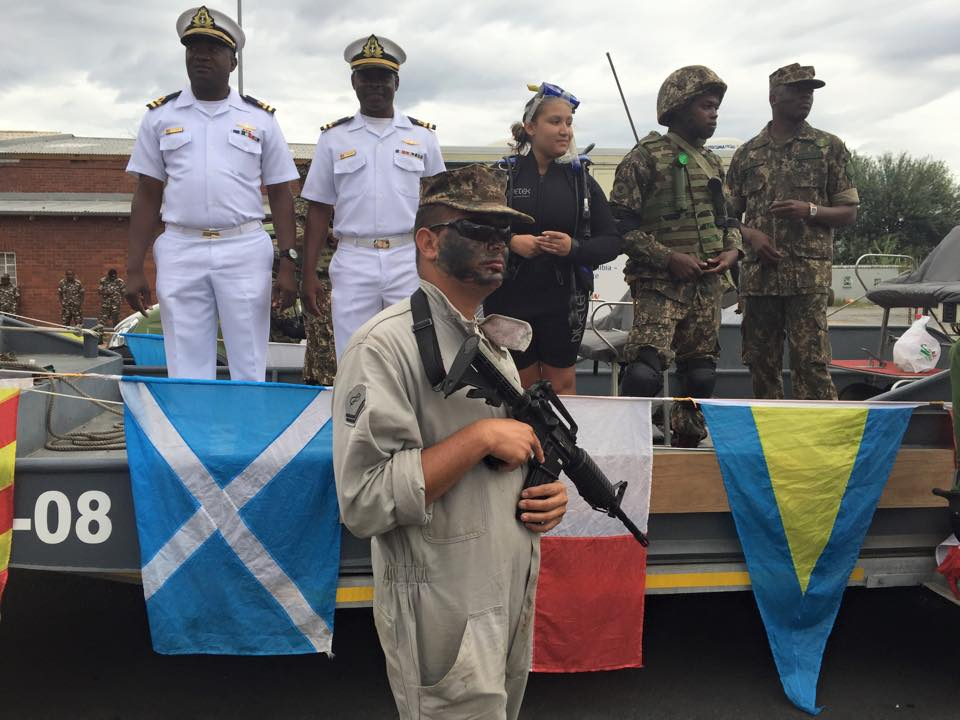
Naval officers and marines of the Namibian Navy

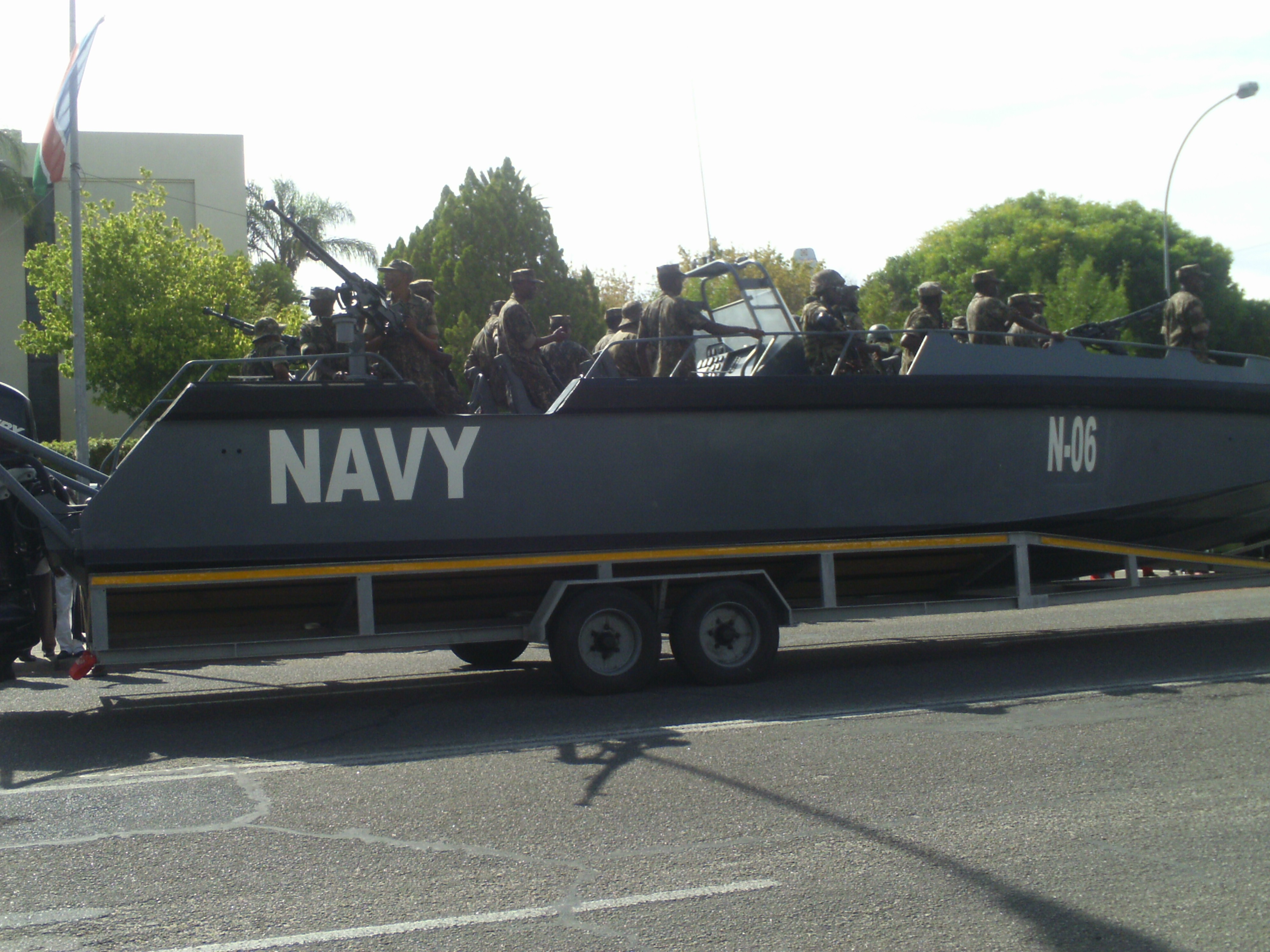
Marines aboard a Navy Interceptor

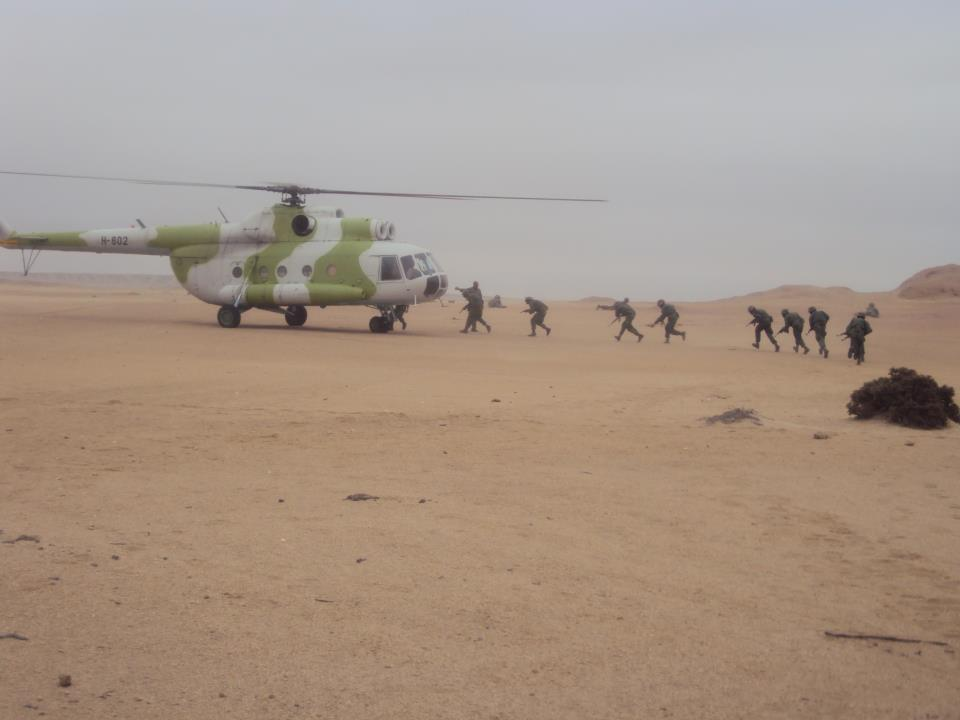
Air Force Mi-17 carrying out exercises with Namibian Marines

External videos
- Namibian Marines tackling an obstacle course
- A video of the Marines performing tactical demonstration
