= Penda Ya Ndakolo =

Namibian politician

Jafet Penda Ya Ndakolo

Governor of Oshikoto Region
- In office 2020 – 28 March 2025
- President: Hage Geingob
- Prime Minister: Saara Kuugongelwa
- Preceded by: Henock Kankoshi
- Succeeded by: Sacky Kathindi
- In office 2004–2015
- President: Hifikepunye Pohamba
- Prime Minister: Nahas Angula
- Succeeded by: Henock Kankoshi

Minister of Defence
- In office 2015–2020
- President: Hage Geingob
- Prime Minister: Saara Kuugongelwa
- Preceded by: Nahas Angula
- Succeeded by: Peter Vilho

Personal details
- Born: 23 March 1960 (age 66) Oshigambo, Oshikoto Region, South West Africa (now Namibia)
- Party: SWAPO

Jafet Penda Ya Ndakolo (born 23 March 1960 at Oshigambo) is a Namibian SWAPO politician and a former governor of Oshikoto Region. He served as Minister of Defence from 2015 to 2020. After losing his position as minister in 2020 he was appointed to his old position as governor again.

Ya Ndakolo fought for the Peoples Liberation Army of Namibia (PLAN). He studied at the Eastern and Southern Management Institute (ESAMA), and was from 1980 to 1989 a specialist in radio communication warfare.

He was a SWAPO district coordinator between 1990 and 1992 before getting elected as Regional Councillor for Omuthiya Gwiipundi Constituency in Oshikoto Region, eventually being elevated as the Region's governor. He replaced Nico Kaiyamo as a member of the National Council in 2004.

In 2014, he was awarded The Most Distinguished Order of Namibia: First Class by president Hifikepunye Pohamba.
