= Commander of the Navy (Namibia) =

The commander of the Navy is the professional head of the Namibian Navy. The current commander of the Navy is Rear Admiral Sacheus !Gonteb. It is a position equivalent to that of Chief of the Navy in South Africa or Chief of Naval Operations in the United States Navy.

By convention, serving Navy commanders hold the rank of rear admiral.

== List of commanders ==
The following officers have held the appointment of Navy Commander or its previous title Maritime Wing Commander since the commissioning of the Maritime Wing on 11 September 1998.

Navy Commanders
Rank	Name	Term Start	Term End	President
Captain	Phestus Sacharia	1998	2002	Sam Nujoma
Rear Admiral	Peter Vilho	2002	2017	Sam Nujoma Hifikepunye Pohamba
Rear Admiral	Sinsy Nghipandua	2017	2020	Hage Geingob
Rear Admiral	Alweendo Amungulu	2020	2024	Hage Geingob
Rear Admiral	Sacheus !Gonteb	2024	Present	Nangolo Mbumba Netumbo Nandi-Ndaitwah

== See also ==
- Namibian Defence Force
