= NS Oryx =

History

Namibia
- Name: Oryx
- Namesake: Oryx
- Builder: Abeking & Rasmussen
- Launched: 1975
- Recommissioned: 2002
- Home port: Walvis Bay
- Identification: MMSI number: 659011000; Callsign: V5KX
- Status: in active service

General characteristics
- Displacement: 406 tonnes (400 long tons)
- Length: 41 m (134 ft 6 in)
- Beam: 9.12 m (29 ft 11 in)
- Draught: 2.94 m (9 ft 8 in)
- Installed power: 2 × Deutz RSBA16M528 diesel engines; 2,000 hp (1,491 kW)
- Propulsion: 1 shaft
- Speed: 14 knots (26 km/h; 16 mph)
- Range: 4,100 nmi (7,600 km) at 11 kn (20 km/h)
- Complement: 20
- Sensors & processing systems: 1 ×Furuno FR1525 radar; 1× Furuno FR805D radar
- Armament: 1 × 12.7/90 mm gun (1 × 1)

NS Oryx (P01) is a patrol vessel of the Namibian Navy. Formerly a civilian fisheries patrol vessel it was transferred to the Ministry of Defence in 2002, it was commissioned in 2002 into the Namibian Navy.

== Operational history ==
The vessel was donated by the Namibian Ministry of Fisheries (NMF) to the Navy in 2002 making it the first ship of the Namibian Navy in service joining two smaller Namacurra boat donated by the South African Navy. The first Commanding Officer of the vessel was Commander Sinsy Nghipandua.The vessel is utilised by the Namibian Navy for general Exclusive Economic Zone management.
