= Sacheus !Gonteb =

Namibian military officer

Sacheus Randy !Gonteb
- Born: c.1970s South West Africa, South Africa
- Military career
- Allegiance: South Africa (until 1990); Namibia
- Branch: Namibian Navy
- Service years: 1994 – present (32 years, 7 months)
- Rank: Rear admiral
- Commands: Navy Commander (2024-present) Commanding Officer NS Brendan Simbwaye

Sacheus Randy !Gonteb (Note: ! signifies a "click" sound. See Exclamation mark#Phonetics.) is a Namibian military officer who is serving as the current commander of the Namibian Navy. He was appointed to office in December 2024. Prior to that, he served as Deputy Navy Commander (DNC) with the rank of Rear Admiral (JG).

== Career ==
=== NDF career ===
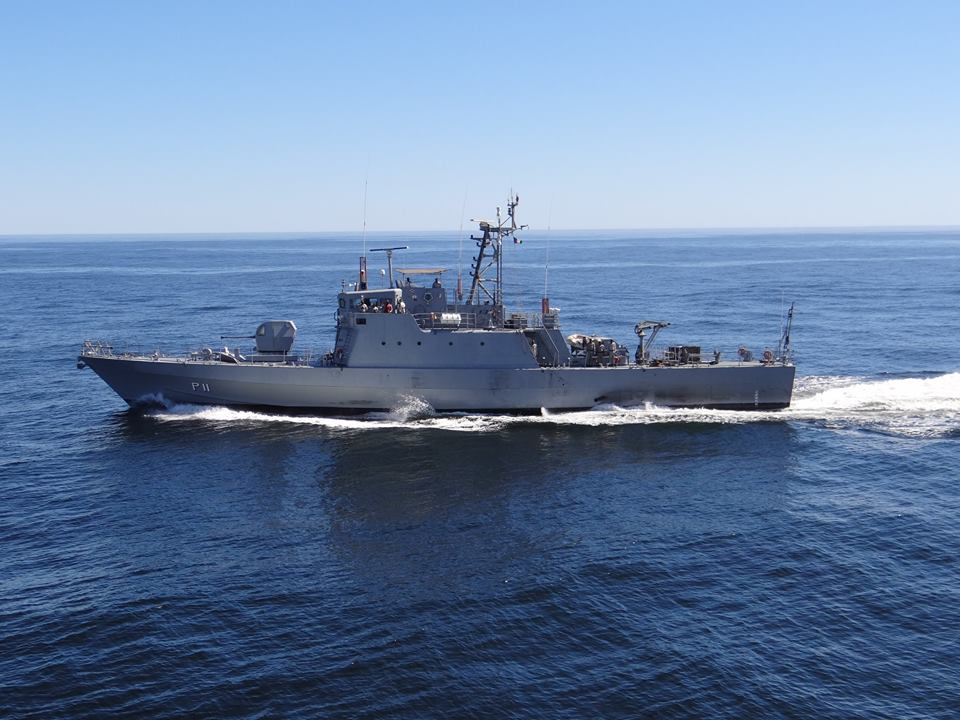
NS Brendan Simbwaye, a boat previously commanded by Admiral !Gonteb

!Gonteb's career in the Namibian Defence Force started in the 1994. He was sent to Brazil for Naval training . He was trained in Brazil by the Brazilian Navy as a naval officer. He is a graduate of Admiral Ary Rongel Class of 1999. He served in different command positions within the Navy. In 2009, as a lieutenant commander he served as the first Commanding Officer of NS Brendan Simbwaye and captained it on its 22-day maiden voyage from Brazil to Walvis Bay. He has also served as Defence Attache to the People's Republic of China. In 2020, he was promoted to the flag rank of Rear Admiral (JG) and appointed as Deputy Navy Commander. In December 2024 following the retirement of Rear Admiral Alweendo Amungulu he was promoted to rear admiral and appointed as navy commander.

=== Qualifications ===
- National Defense Course - (Zimbabwe National Defence University)

=== Military decorations ===
- Navy Foreign Service Medal
- The Southern Cross Medal
- Naval Merit Order Medal(Brazilian Navy)
- Navy Pioneer Medal
- NDF Commendation Medal
- NDF 10 Years Service Medal
- NDF 20 Years Service Medal
- NDF 30 Years Service Medal

Military offices
Preceded by Rear Admiral Alweendo Amungulu	Namibian Navy Commander; 2024 – Incumbent	Incumbent
