= Kafubu, Namibia =

Kafubu Kafuvu
- Country: Namibia
- Region: Zambezi Region
- Constituency: Kabbe South

Population
  - Total: 200–300

Kafubu (also Kafuvu) is the largest settlement on Impalila, an island in the far north-east of Namibia. It is situated on the eastern tip of the Caprivi Strip on the Chobe River in Namibia. Across the Chobe is the Botswana town of Kasane. With a population of between 200 and 300, Kafubu villagers are mostly Subiya farmers and fishermen. Kafubu belongs to the Kabbe South electoral constituency.

Impalila island is completely cut off from Namibian road infrastructure. It can only be reached by boat. Most residents use the Botswana–Namibia border crossing on the island and buy groceries in Botswana. As a result, inhabitants on Impalila use the Botswana pula as their main currency instead of the Namibian dollar. They are also subject to import duty on their shopping.

Several large baobab trees dot the area. Most homes in Kafubu are made of reeds and dirt. Tourists visiting Kafubu from nearby Kasane and Chobe National Park can tour the village and buy crafts.
