= Sinsy Nghipandua =

Sinsy Ndeshi Bamba Nghipandua
- Born: 8 August 1960 (age 66); Omundundu
- Military career
- Allegiance: Namibia
- Branch: PLAN; Namibian Army; Namibian Navy
- Service years: 1978 – 2020 (42 years, 7 months)
- Rank: Rear Admiral
- Commands: Namibian Navy (2017-2020); Naval Operations (2009-2017); Naval Base Capt (N) P.N. Sacharia (2005-2009); NPV Oryx (2002-2005)
- Conflicts: Namibian War of Independence
- Awards: Namibia’s Independence medal

Rear Admiral Sinsy Ndeshi Bamba Nghipandua is a retired Namibian military officer who is currently serving as director general of the Namibia Central Intelligence Service. His last military appointment he served as the commander of the Namibian Navy, to which he was appointed 2017. Prior to that he served as commander of naval operations with the rank of rear admiral (junior grade).

== Career ==
=== Exile ===
Admiral Nghipandua joined People's Liberation Army of Namibia under SWAPO in exile in 1978 as a 17-year-old and received military training in the Soviet Union, Yugoslavia and Cuba.

=== NDF career ===
Nghipandua's career in the Namibian Defence Force started in 1990 as a captain after Namibia's independence when he was appointed as a staff officer in the military intelligence branch of the Namibian Army. In 1995 he attended the Naval Surface Warfare Course in Brazil. In 2000 he was attached to the Brazilian Navy as a ship captain under instruction as an executive officer. Nghipandua became the first Namibian ship commanding officer as he was appointed as captain of the patrol vessel NPV Oryx in 2002 with the rank of commander. In 2005 he was appointed as the commanding officer of the Naval Base Capt (N) P.N. Sacharia with the rank of navy captain. In 2009 he was appointed as the commander naval operations with the rank of rear admiral (junior grade). In 2017 he rose to the rank of rear admiral and appointed as navy commander. He served in that position until his retirement in August 2020.

=== Intelligence career ===
In 2025, president Netumbo Nandi-Ndaitwah appointed Nghipandua as the director general of Namibia Central Intelligence Service.

=== Qualifications ===
- Command and Staff Course and NDC programme in Kenya in 2008
- Naval Senior Staff Course in USA
- Naval Officers Formative Course in Brazil
- Junior Staff Course (BMATT)
- Recce Training in Lubango, Angola
- Intelligence and Special Operations in Cuba
- Counter Intelligence
- Advance military Law

He also holds a:

- Bachelor of technology in business administration from the University of South Africa
- National diploma in public administration from the then Polytechnic of Namibia.
- Postgraduate diploma in national security and strategic studies from the United States naval staff college

=== Military Decorations ===
- Namibian Army Pioneer Medal
- Independence Medal
- Meritorious services (10) years’ services medal
- NDF Commendation Medal
- Naval Merit Order Medal(Brazilian Navy)
- Namibian Navy Achievement Medal
- The Sea Services 250 days Medal
- The ten years (Navy) Meritorious Services Medal
- The Namibian Navy Pioneer Medal
- The Silver Star Medal
- The Southern Cross Medal
- Navy Cross Medal

Military offices
Preceded by Peter Vilho	Namibian Navy Commander; 2017 – 2020	Succeeded by Alweendo Amungulu
Preceded by Vacant	Commander Naval Operations; 2009 – 2017	Succeeded by Alweendo Amungulu
