= NS Elephant =

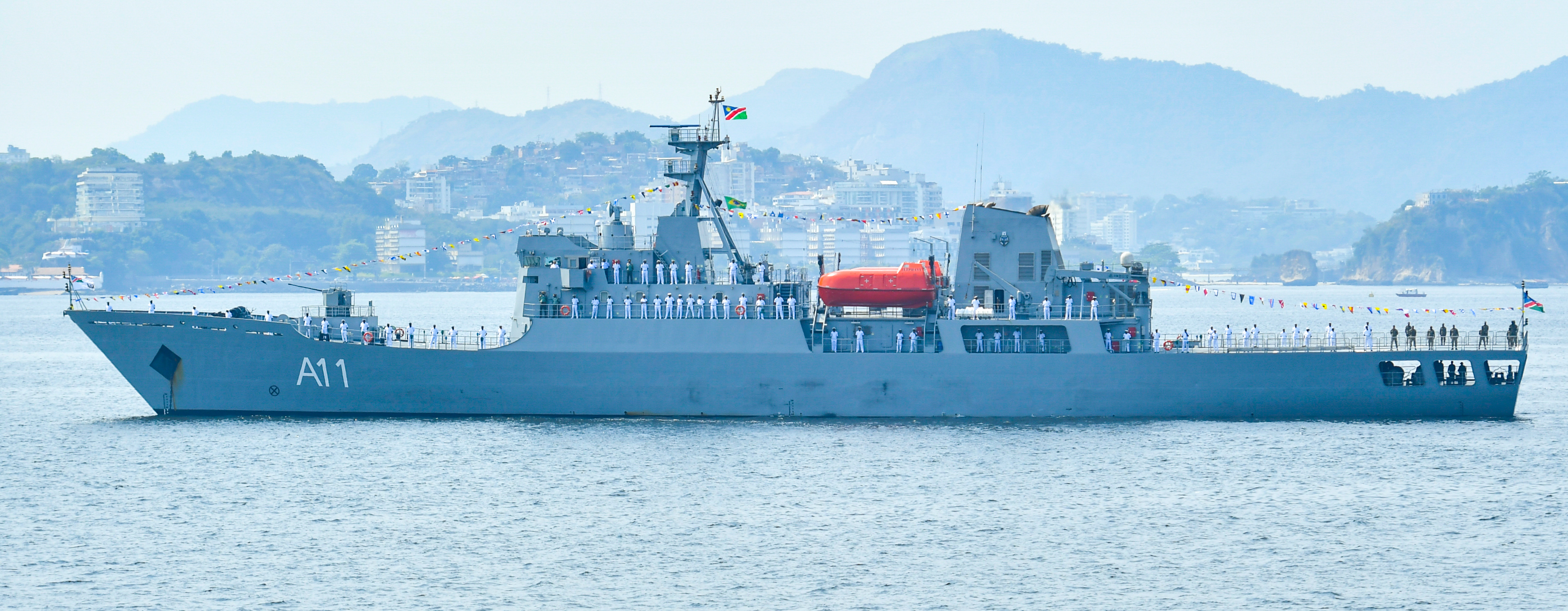
- NS Elephant in 2022

History

Namibia
- Name: Elephant
- Namesake: Elephant
- Builder: Wuhan (Qingshan) Shipyards, Wuhan, China
- Laid down: 2011
- Launched: 2012
- Acquired: 2012
- Commissioned: 7 September 2012
- In service: 2012-present
- Home port: Walvis Bay
- Status: Ship in active service

General characteristics
- Displacement: 2,858 long tons (2,904 t)
- Length: 108 m (354 ft 4 in)
- Beam: 14 m (45 ft 11 in)
- Draught: 3.9
- Range: 6,000 nmi (11,000 km) at 18 knots (33 km/h; 21 mph)
- Complement: 68
- Armament: 1 × 37 mm gun; 2 × twin 14.5 mm guns
- Aviation facilities: Flight deck

NS Elephant (A11) is a Chinese-built multipurpose warship of the Namibian Navy. Construction of NS Elephant began in mid-2011 and the ship was officially handed over to the Namibian Navy on 3 July 2012 after sea acceptance trials were completed. The vessel is used to monitor Namibia's exclusive economic zone.

== Description ==
The ship resembles Chinese Haixun 01 patrol vessels. NS Elephant has a large flight deck but no hangar. It has bunks to take on an additional 150 passengers. On its deck it may carry 6-by-12-foot (1.8 m × 3.7 m) containers, totalling 24 tonnes or six armoured personnel carriers of 12 tonnes each. The superstructure has a fire control radar mounted for targeting the main 37 mm gun. The two twin 14.5 mm guns are manually operated. The ship carries two large lifeboats amidships. There is also a crane on the port side and a smaller launch boat on the starboard side. Elephant is powered by two Caterpillar V16 diesel engines and has three generators and a fourth emergency power generator plus a bow thruster.

== Operational history ==
Construction of NS Elephant began in mid-2011 at the Wuhan Shipyard. Named for the largest African land animal, the elephant, the ship was accepted by the Namibian Navy on 3 July 2012 after sea acceptance trials were completed. The ship is operational, utilised for general exclusive economic zone management. The ship is also used to train and qualify junior sailors and officers. It also participates in training operations with the marines with marine amphibious operations being launched from the ship.
