= Namacurra-class patrol boat =

Small harbour patrol boat

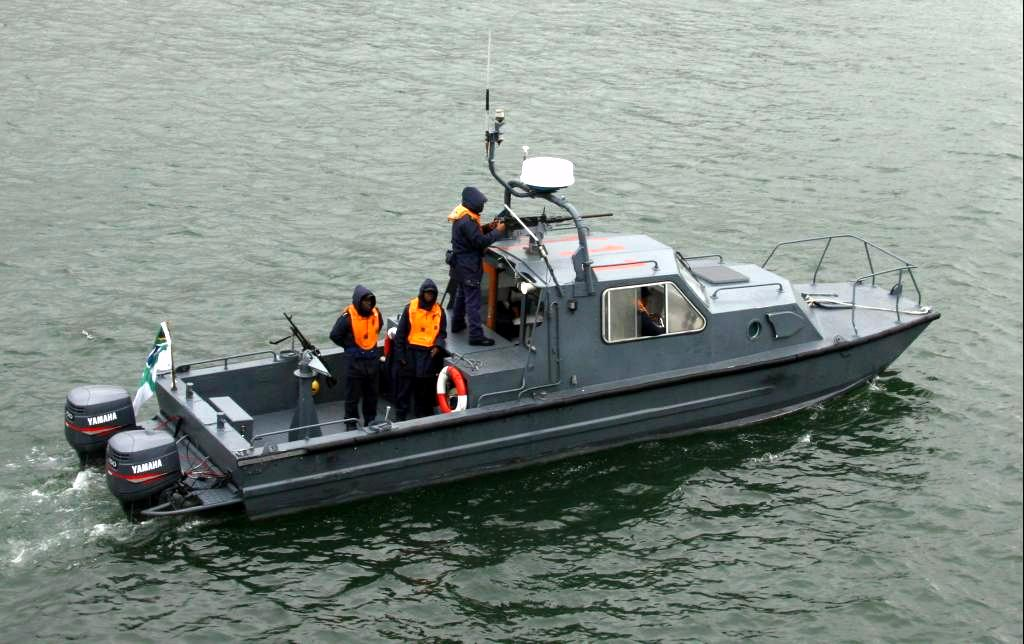
- Namacurra-class patrol boats

Class overview
- Name: Namacurra class
- Builders: Tornado Products, South Africa
- Operators: South African Navy; Angolan Navy; Malawi Navy; Mozambique Naval Command; Namibian Navy
- Built: 1980–1981
- In commission: 1980–present
- Completed: 33
- Active: 32
- Lost: 1

General characteristics
- Class & type: Harbour patrol craft
- Displacement: 4 t (3.9 long tons) light; 5.2 t (5.1 long tons) fully loaded
- Length: 9.5 m (31 ft 2 in)
- Beam: 2.7 m (8 ft 10 in)
- Draught: 0.8 m (2 ft 7 in)
- Propulsion: 2 × 280 kW (380 bhp) gasoline engines
- Speed: 30 knots (56 km/h; 35 mph)
- Range: 180 nmi (330 km; 210 mi) at 20 knots (37 km/h; 23 mph)
- Complement: 4
- Sensors & processing systems: Surface search: Furuno I-band
- Armament: 1 × 12.7 mm (0.50 in) machine gun; 2 × 7.62 mm (0.30 in) light machine guns

The Namacurra-class patrol boats are a series of small harbour patrol boats currently in service with South Africa, Namibia, Malawi and Mozambique.

== Background and description ==
The Namacurra class (also spelled "Namicurra") is a series of small harbour patrol craft designed and built in South Africa. Their catamaran-type hulls are made of glass-reinforced plastic. They have a displacement of 4 tonnes (3.9 long tons) light and 5.2 t (5.1 long tons) fully loaded and measure 9.5 metres (31 ft 2 in) with a beam of 2.7 m (8 ft 10 in) and a draught of 0.8 m (2 ft 7 in). The boats are powered by two BMW or Yamaha 280-kilowatt (380 bhp) gasoline engines turning two propellers giving the vessels a maximum speed of 30 knots (56 km/h; 35 mph) With a crew of four they have a maximum range of 180 nautical miles (330 km; 210 mi) at 20 knots (37 km/h; 23 mph).

The patrol boats mount a Furuno surface search radar operating on the I band. They are armed with a 12.7-millimetre (0.50 in) machine gun or two 7.62 mm (0.30 in) light machine guns. When fitted the 12.7 mm gun is placed atop the pilothouse facing forward and the 7.62 mm guns are mounted facing aft. Their small size allows the vessels to be transported by trailers and transported by road.

== Construction and career ==
33 patrol boats were built in South Africa between 1980 and 1981 for service with the South African Navy. They were initially numbered beginning with Y 1500, but they were later renamed in South African service beginning keeping only the final two digits of their initial names, beginning with Y 02. These boats are in use with the harbour patrol forces in Cape Town, Port Elizabeth, Durban and Walvis Bay. Y 1506 was lost at sea off Port Elizabeth. Several boats were transferred to other nations. Five were refitted for advanced riverine operations as part of Project Xena. Three were operated on Lake Tanganyika.

== Export ==
Y 1520 transferred to Malawi in October 1988. The vessel was renamed Kaning'a. Kaning'a was refitted in 2007. A second boat was transferred in October 2008. Two, Y 1501 and Y 1510 were transferred to Namibia on 29 October 2002. They were renamed Y 01 and Y 10 respectively. Y 1507 and Y 1530 were donated to Mozambique on 14 September 2004 They too were renamed to Y 07 and Y 30. In 2006, a further two were donated to Angola.
