= Naval Training School =

Training institution of the Namibian Navy

- Active: 2016
- Country: (Namibia)
- Branch: Namibian Navy
- Current Base: Rooikop Base, Walvis Bay

Commanders
- Current commander: Captain (Navy) Fanuel Iyambo

The Naval Training School is the main training institution of the Namibian Navy. It was created in 2009, and is located at the Wilbard Tashiya Nakada Military Base, Walvis Bay.

== History ==
Recognizing the need to locally train its personnel as it was not sustainable to send sailors abroad for training for the most basic courses, the Navy set up the school in 2009. The school is assisted by the resident Brazilian Military Advisory and Training Team (BRAZMATT) from the Brazilian Navy and was commissioned by President Hage Geingob, who inaugurated the school on 22 July 2016.

== Training ==
Currently the school only trains naval ratings, administratively it is divided into two wings, the Sailors Training Wing and the Marine Training Wing.

Some of the courses offered at the school are:

- Basic Seamanship for Sailors Course
- Marine Soldier Specialization
- Marine Section Commander Course
- Marine Petty Officers Course
- Sailors Petty Officers Course

== Leadership ==
Naval Training School
From	Commandant	To	Ribbon
2016	Capt (Navy) Lazarus Erastus	2021	
29 November 2021	Capt (Navy)Fanuel Iyambo	incumbent	
From	Regimental Sergeant Major	To	Ribbon
	Unknown		
