= Peter Vilho =

Namibian Politician

Rear Admiral Peter Vilho

Minister of Defense
- In office 21 March 2020 – 6 April 2021
- President: Hage Geingob
- Preceded by: Penda Ya Ndakolo
- Succeeded by: Frans Kapofi

Personal details
- Born: 2 February 1962 (age 64) Windhoek, South West Africa
- Awards: Excellent Order of the Eagle, third Class

Military service
- Allegiance: Namibia
- Branch/service: PLAN (1981–1990); Namibian Army (1990–1999); Namibian Navy (1999–2017)
- Years of service: 1981–2017
- Rank: Rear Admiral
- Battles/wars: Namibian War of Independence

Peter Hafeni Vilho (born 2 February 1962) is a Namibian politician and retired rear admiral who is a member of the Parliament of Namibia, a former Minister of Defence, and a former commander of the Namibian Navy. He was appointed the commander of the maritime wing of the Namibian Defence Force in 2002. In September 2017 he was appointed executive director of the Ministry of Defence. In March 2020, Namibian president Hage Geingob appointed Vilho as the Minister of Defense and Veteran Affairs. Vilho served until his resignation in April 2021 after allegations of holding an undeclared bank account.

== Early life and education ==
Vilho joined SWAPO in exile in 1977 as a 15-year-old teenager. After independence of Namibia Vilho studied for an Advanced Course and Resource Management Course at Fort Benning from 1990 to 1992 as a Finance Officer, and in 1994 attended the Junior Staff and Command Course in Namibia. He attended the Naval Officers Formation Course in Brazil between 1995 and 1998 followed by an Advanced Course on Politics and Strategy at the National War College, Brazil. He holds a Master of Business Administration from the Maastricht School of Management in the Netherlands.

== Military career ==
In 1981 Vilho joined the People's Liberation Army of Namibia (PLAN). After joining PLAN in 1981 for basic training he specialised as a combat engineer in 1982, by 1983 Vilho was an engineering instructor at the Tobias Hainyeko Training Centre, Lubango, Angola. In 1984 he was appointed an engineer company commander and anti-tank battery commander at the Northern Front and Striking Unit.

Vilho's career in the Namibian Defence Force started in 1990 after Namibia's independence when he was inducted with the rank of Captain and appointed paymaster for the 125 Battalion in the Namibian Army. In 1993, he was promoted to the rank of Major and appointed the chief paymaster for the army headquarters. Later in the year, he was appointed staff officer grade 2 (SO2) operations and training army headquarters with the same rank. Between 1994 and 1998 he attended the Admiral Wandenkolk Instruction Centre (CIAW) in Rio de Janeiro. Upon graduating he was appointed the chief of staff NDF Maritime Wing in 1998 and promoted to the rank of Commander. In 2001 he was appointed the deputy commander NDF Maritime Wing, and in the following year following the death of Captain (Navy) Phestus Sakaria the Commander NDF Maritime Wing, Vilho was appointed his successor with the rank of Naval Captain. The rank of Commodore was bestowed on him in 2004 at the commissioning of the Maritime Wing as a fully-fledged navy. In 2007 he ascended to the rank of Rear Admiral.

== Political career ==
Vilho retired from active military service in September 2017 and was appointed Executive Director of the Ministry of Defence. On 21 March 2020 president Hage Geingob appointed him as Minister of Defence succeeding Penda ya Ndakolo. With this appointment he also became a non-voting member of parliament.

On 6 April 2021 Vilho resigned due to holding an undeclared bank account in Hong Kong that is "allegedly linked to illicit proceeds". The resignation triggered a cabinet reshuffle in which Vilho was succeeded by Frans Kapofi. He also lost his seat in parliament. Geingob appointed Patience Masua in his stead.

== Honours and decorations ==
- Order of the Eagle 3rd Class – Government of the Republic of Namibia
- NDF 10 years service medal
- NDF Commendation Medal
- Medal of Merit "Tamandare" – Brazilian Navy
- Order of Naval Merit (Grand Officer) Medal – Brazilian Navy
- The Southern Cross Medal – Namibian Navy
- Navy Pioneers Medal – Namibian Navy
- Navy Cross Medal – Namibian Navy
- Gold Star Medal– Namibian Navy
- Sacharia Medal – Namibian Navy
- Achievement Medal — Namibian Navy
- Ten Year service – Namibian Navy
- 750 Days at Sea Service Medal – Namibian Navy
- Medal of Merit "Tamandare" – Brazilian Navy

Military offices
Preceded by Vacant	Namibian Navy Commander; 2004 – 2017	Succeeded by Sinsy Nghipandua
Preceded by Phestus Sacharia	Namibian Defence Force Maritime Wing Commander; 2002 – 2004	Succeeded by Abolished
