= Namibian Navy =

Namibian Defence Force naval warfare branch

- Emblem of the Namibian Navy
- Founded: 10 October 2004; 22 years ago
- Country: Namibia
- Type: Navy
- Size: 3,000
- Part of: Namibian Defence Force
- Garrison/HQ: Walvis Bay, Erongo Region, Namibia
- Anniversaries: 11 September 1998 (Maritime Wing); 10 October 2004 (Navy)

Commanders
- Commander-In-Chief: Netumbo Nandi-Ndaitwah
- Minister of Defence: Frans Kapofi
- Commander: Rear Admiral Sacheus !Gonteb

Insignia
- Naval Ensign

The Namibian Navy is the naval force branch of the Namibian Defence Force.

== History ==
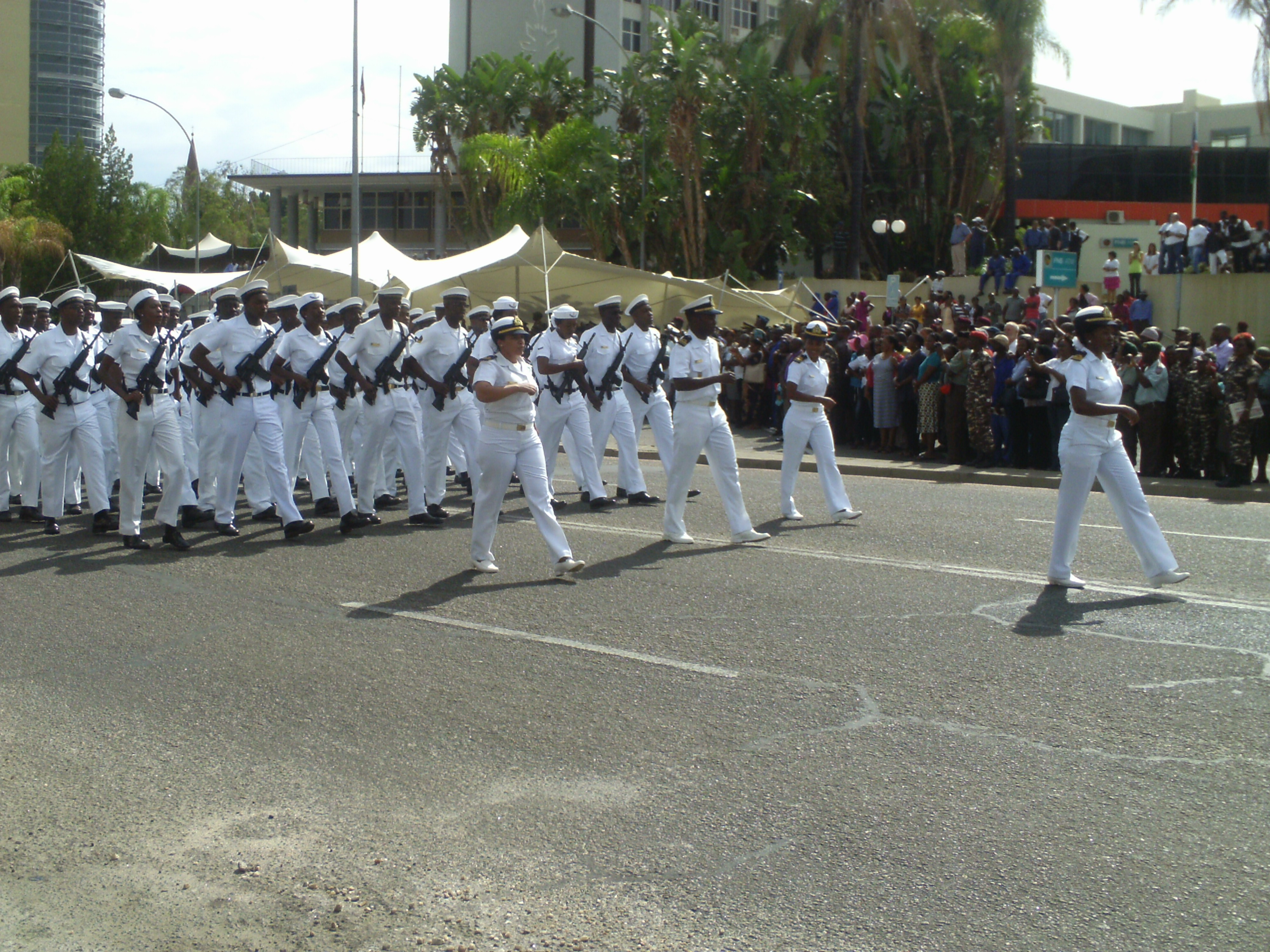
Namibian Navy sailors on parade in downtown Windhoek on 20 March 2015 during Namibia's Independence celebration

Development of Namibia's Navy has been slowest of the three Arms of Service. The force was only formally established on 11 September 1998 as a maritime wing, and in 2004 as a fully-fledged navy.

Extensive Brazilian aid has assisted in the navy's development. Initially, a group of four trainees were dispatched to the Naval Academy in Brazil, complemented by ten officers from the Namibian Army. These personnel formed the core group that were sent to Brazil in August 1995 after Walvis Bay had been integrated into Namibia in 1994.

This group, led by Phestus Sacharia, consisted of officers such as Peter Vilho, Sinsy Nghipandua, Alweendo Amungulu, and Petrus Tjandja, would be the future Headquarters staff and ship captains. Later in the 1990s, two more groups were sent to Brazil to study at Admiral Wandenkolk Instruction Center in Rio de Janeiro.

By 2004, 180 officers and ratings had been trained for the maritime wing, 168 of which had been trained in Brazil. An ongoing co-operation program allows Namibian sailors and naval officers to be trained by the Brazilian Navy; by 2009, 466 seamen had been trained. Brazil also provided assistance in preparing a nautical chart of the approach to Walvis Bay and consulting in charting the outer limits of the continental shelf.

As of 2024, 1200 Navy personnel have been trained in Brazil. The Brazilian Navy has also trained the Namibian Marine Corps of which more than 1400 have been trained at the Naval Training School at Rooikop.

== Operations ==
The Navy's maritime wing headquarters was established in 1998, while in 2000 construction of a naval base began at Walvis Bay. The first maritime wing commander was Captain Phestus Sacharia.

The Navy has approximately 1200 personnel and deploys a small number of lightly armed patrol vessels.

The first ship to be commissioned into service was the donated patrol boat Oryx in 2002. In 2004, Brazil and Namibia signed an agreement for the delivery of a patrol boat and two smaller patrol craft. The newly built 200-ton patrol boat NS Brendan Simbwaye, built at the Brazilian shipyard INACE, was commissioned on 19 January 2009.

== Role ==
The Ministry of Defence has outlined the naval policy as follows:

"In peacetime, the Navy of the NDF have a role of augmenting civil offshore patrol forces, particularly providing the means and the expertise to execute enforcement action effectively. Specific tasks include assisting civil forces to combat illegal immigration, smuggling (arms, drugs etc.) and threats to the environment; conducting maritime surveillance, maritime search and rescue; and assisting the Ministry of Fisheries with enforcing a fisheries protection regime. A longer term peacetime task is the protection of offshore oil, gas, diamonds and other installations. A navy aerial surveillance component is a necessary part of the defence system."

== Equipment ==
The fleet is operationally divided into four squadrons, based on the different roles of the craft. The squadrons, which became active on 24 May 2018, are:

- Combat Squadron
- Combat Support Squadron
- Coastal Patrol Squadron
- Harbour Patrol Squadron

=== Current ===
| Name | Picture | Origin | Class | Type | Built | Entered service (LNF) | Notes |
Combat Support Squadron
| S11 Elephant | | China | Elephant class | Logistics Support Vessel | 2012 | 2012 | Multipurpose offshore Patrol and logistics vessel built at Wuhan Shipyard. |
Coastal Patrol Boat Squadron
| P11 Brendan Simbwaye | | Brazil | Grajaú-class patrol boat | Patrol Boat | 2009 | 2010 | Hull P11 |
| NPV Oryx | | Germany | Oryx Class | Patrol Boat | 1975 | 2002 | Transferred from Namibian Fisheries ministry to Navy |
Combat Squadron
| C12 Daures | | China | Type 037 corvette Class | Corvette | | 2017 | Ex PLAN ship Wanning hull 786 |
| C13 Brukkaros | | China | Type 037 corvette | Corvette | | 2017 | Ex PLAN ship Ledong Hull 748 |
Harbour Patrol Squadron
| HPB20 Terrace Bay | | Brazil | Marlim Class | Patrol Craft | 2009 | 2010 | Hull HPB20 |
| HPB21 Möwe Bay | | Brazil | Marlim Class | Patrol Craft | 2009 | 2010 | Hull HPB21 |
| Y01 and Y10 | | South Africa | Namacurra class | harbour patrol boat | 1980–1981 | 2002 | Donated by the South African Navy |

=== Other boats ===
In 2012/2013 the Namibian Navy ordered 19 new craft from Kobus Naval Design and Veercraft Marine of South Africa.

- 5x 4-meter rowboats
- 5x 6-meter RHIBs
- 2x 6-meter harbour patrol boats
- 2x 8-meter boarding boats
- 2x 8-meter swamp boats
- 1x 11-meter landing craft
- 2x 14-meter interceptors

In 2021 3x Riverine Patrol Boats were commissioned into the Navy at Naval Base Impalila.

=== Decommissioned ships ===
- 1 Imperial Marinheiro class corvette – 1025 standard tons (1954)
  - NS Lt Gen Dimo Hamaambo – ex Brazilian Navy

== Installations ==
Map of Namibia showing the Namibian Navy bases (Click on base icon for link to details)

=== Old Naval Base ===
The 'Old Naval Base' in Walvis Bay functions as the current headquarters of the Namibian Marine Corps.

== Organisation ==
The navy is a hierarchical organisation with the navy commander exercising overall command. The Navy Commander is always a 2 star flag officer who is then deputized by two 1 star flag officers heading the Naval Operations and the Naval Support directorates. The two directorates are made up of divisions headed by Chiefs of Staff(COS) who are usually Captain(N). Division of Naval Plans & Naval Operations falls under Naval Operations Directorate, while Naval Personnel & Naval ICT falls under Naval Support Directorate. The Navy is further augmented by the Namibian Marine Corps.

=== Command structure ===
| Sleeve insignia | Appointment | Rank and Name |
|---|---|---|
| | Navy Commander | Rear Admiral Sacheus !Gonteb |
| | Deputy Navy Commander | Rear Admiral(JG) Lazarus Erastus |
| | Commander Naval Operations | Rear Admiral(JG) |
| | Commander Naval Support | Rear Admiral(JG) |
| | Master at Arms of the Navy | Warrant Officer class 1 |

=== Master at arms of the Navy ===
The Master at arms of the Navy is the senior most appointment a Warrant Officer Class one my hold at the Navy. Roles of the Master at Arms include ensuring that discipline, drills, dressing code, performance standards and morale of the non-commissioned officers are maintained.

- 1998–2007 WO1 DJ Angolo
- 2007 -unknown W01 Hamunyela
- unknown-currently WO1 Kamati

=== Marines ===
The Namibian Marine Corps is the infantry marines unit of the Namibia. The Namibian Marine Corps is a branch of the Namibian Navy responsible for amphibious warfare, naval boarding, providing security at naval base or shore stations, rapid reaction to event of an emergency requiring military force under responsibility, riverine warfare, small boats capability to the Navy, support coastal defense, and underwater demolition.

They are an infantry marines battalion strong. The marines are trained by Brazilian Military Advisory Team (BRAZMATT) instructors at the Naval Training School near Walvis Bay. The marine commandant is Captain Olavi T. Shipunda.

=== Ranks and insignia ===
Naval ranks and insignia are based on the Royal Navy. Non-Commissioned Officers only retain the ranks as their insignia consists of a system of chevrons. The same ranks are also used by the Namibian Marine Corps. The highest rank in peace time a commissioned officer can attain in the navy is Rear Admiral. There may however be an exception when a naval officer is appointed as Chief of the Defence Force for which the individual which ascend to the rank of Vice-Admiral. The highest rank an enlisted member can attain is Warrant Officer Class 1 but the highest appointment is Namibian Defence Force Sergeant Major.

=== Commissioned officer ranks ===
The rank insignia of commissioned officers.

| Rank group | General / flag officers | | | | Senior officers | | | Junior officers |
|---|---|---|---|---|---|---|---|---|---|---|
| Namibian Navy |
| Namibian Navy | Admiral | Vice admiral | Rear admiral | Rear admiral junior grade | Captain | Commander | Lieutenant commander | Lieutenant | Lieutenant junior grade | Ensign |

=== Other ranks ===
The rank insignia of non-commissioned officers and enlisted personnel.

| Rank group | Senior NCOs | | | | Junior NCOs | | Enlisted |
|---|---|---|---|---|---|---|---|
| Namibian Navy | | | | | | | No insignia |
| Namibian Navy | Warrant officer class 1 | Warrant officer class 2 | Chief petty officer | Petty officer | Leading seaman | Able seaman | Seaman |

== Gallery ==
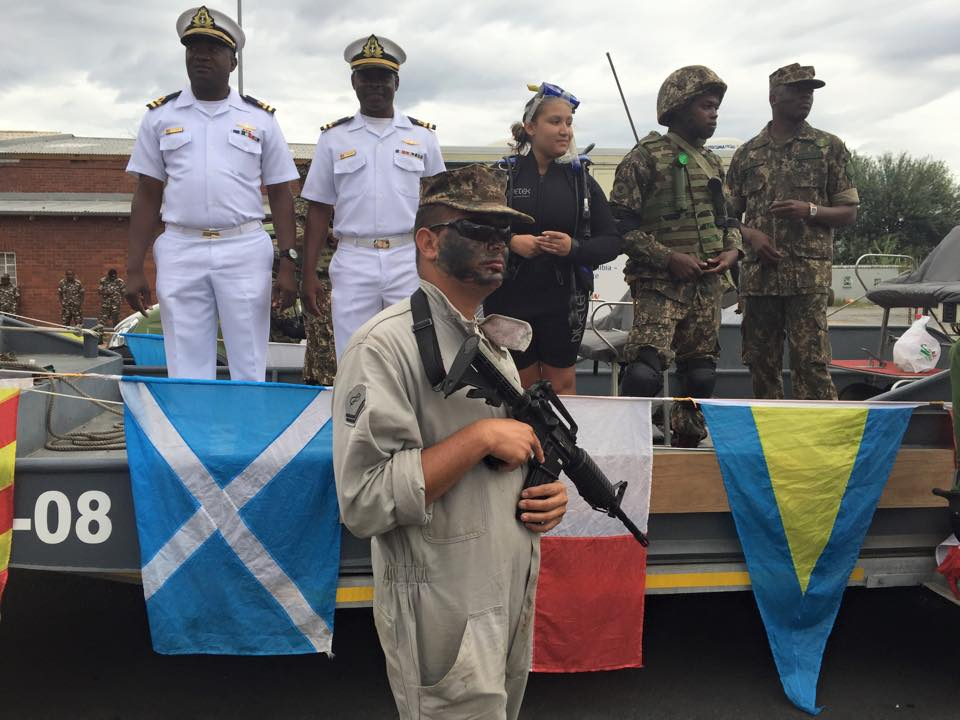
Naval Officers, sailors and marines of the Namibian Navy

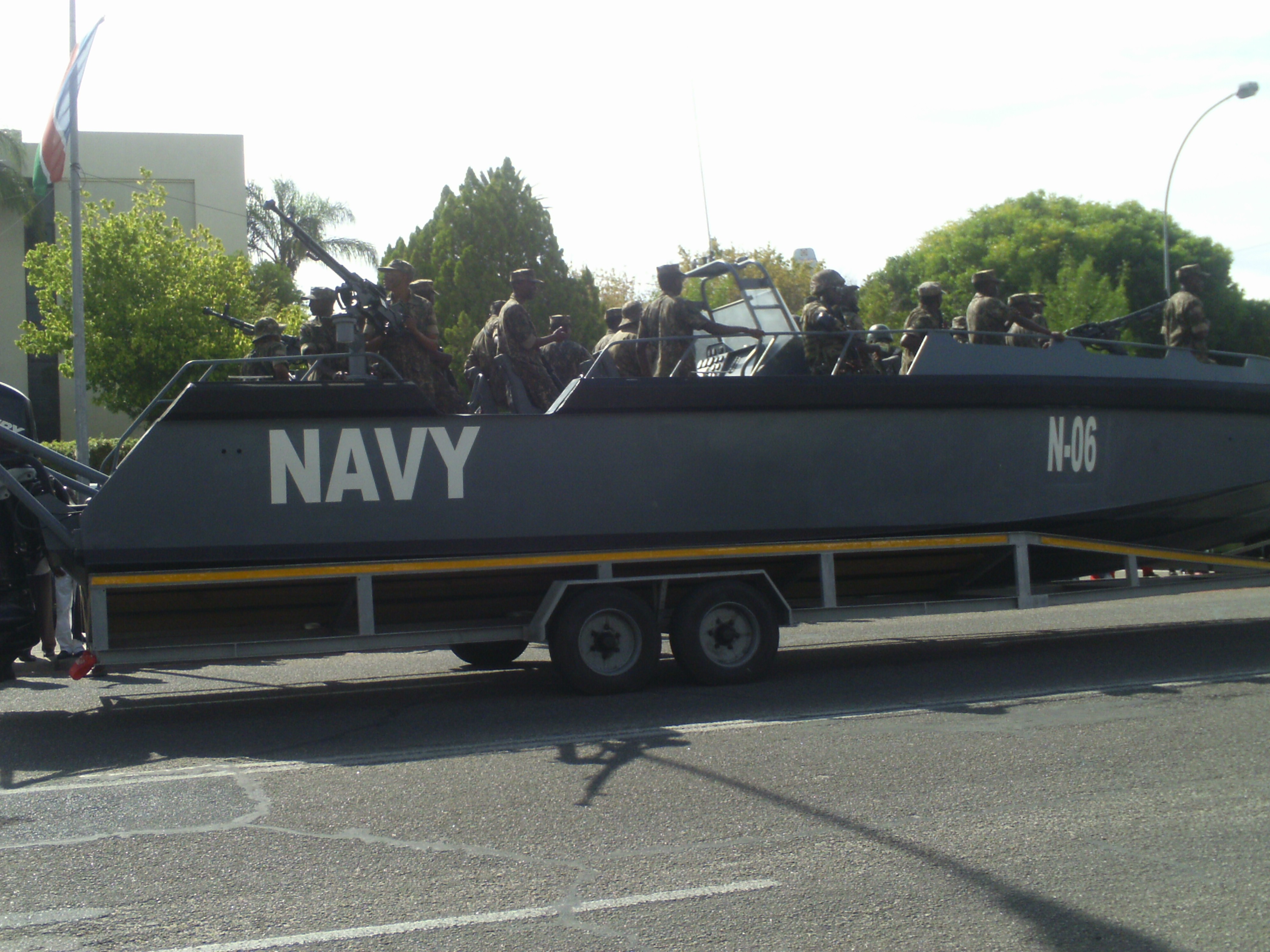
Marines of the Operational Boat Unit

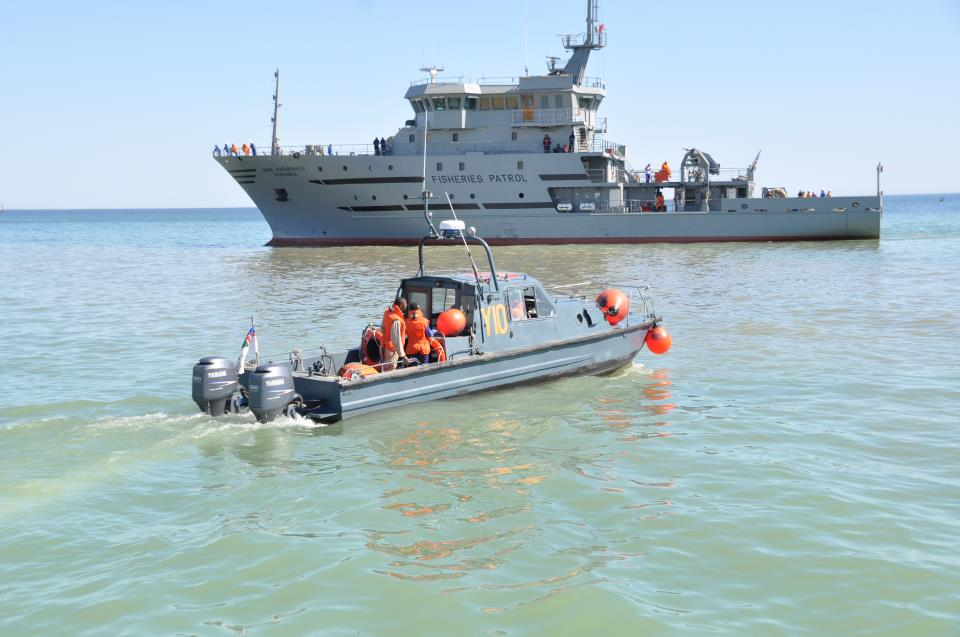
Namibian Navy Namacurra with a fisheries patrol vessel

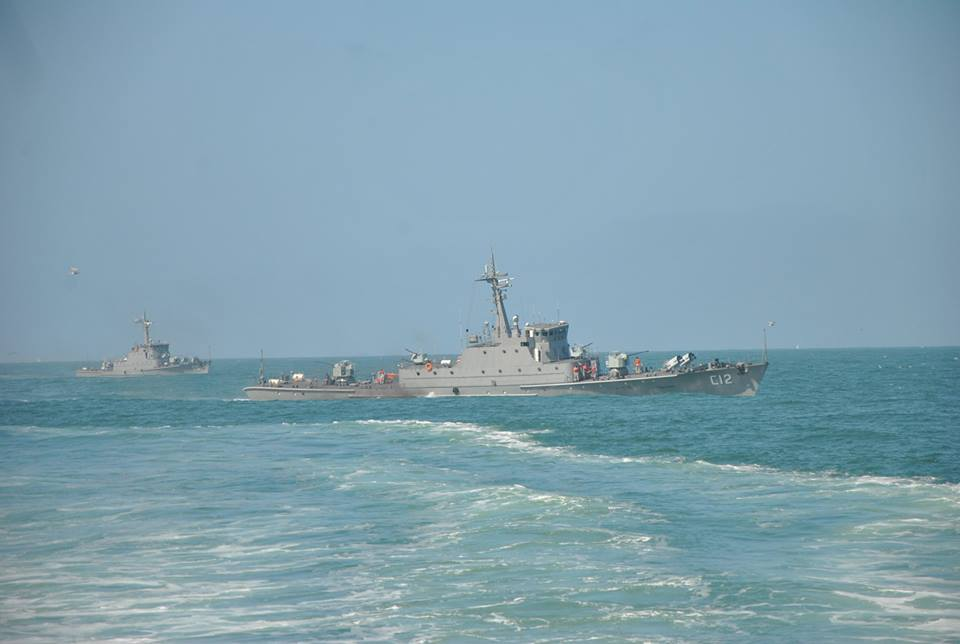
NS Daures & Brukkaros

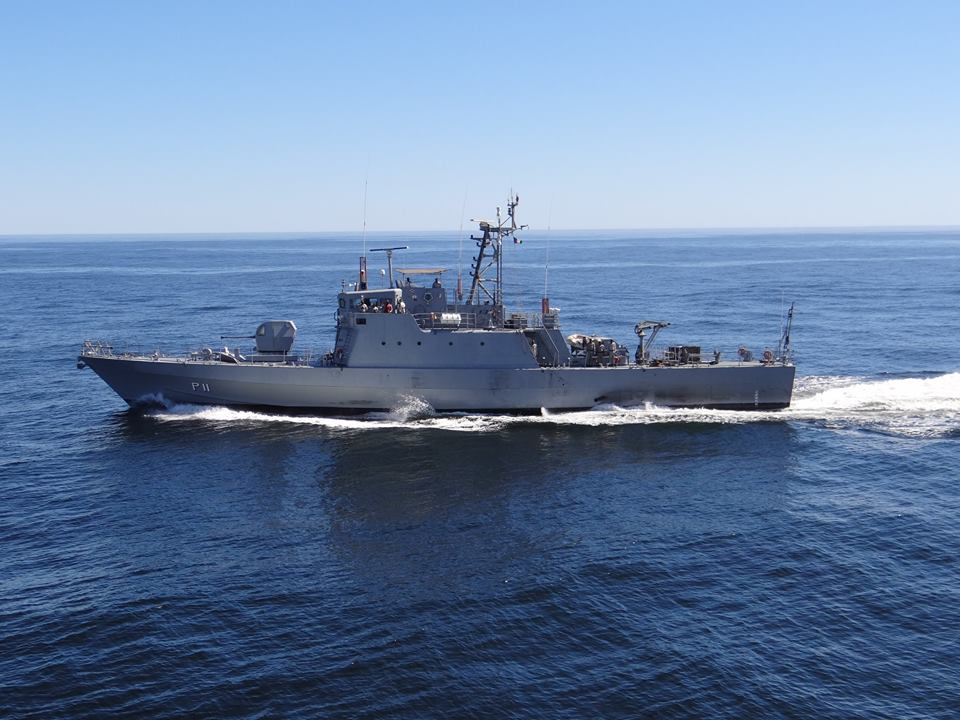
NS Brendan Simbwaye

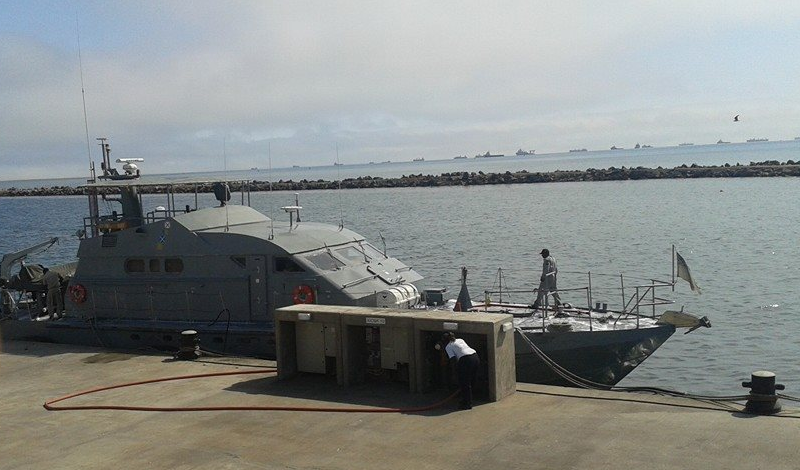
Marlim Class HPB
