= Indústria Naval do Ceará =

Brazilian shipbuilding company

Coordinates: 3.718472°S 38.523417°W

INACE
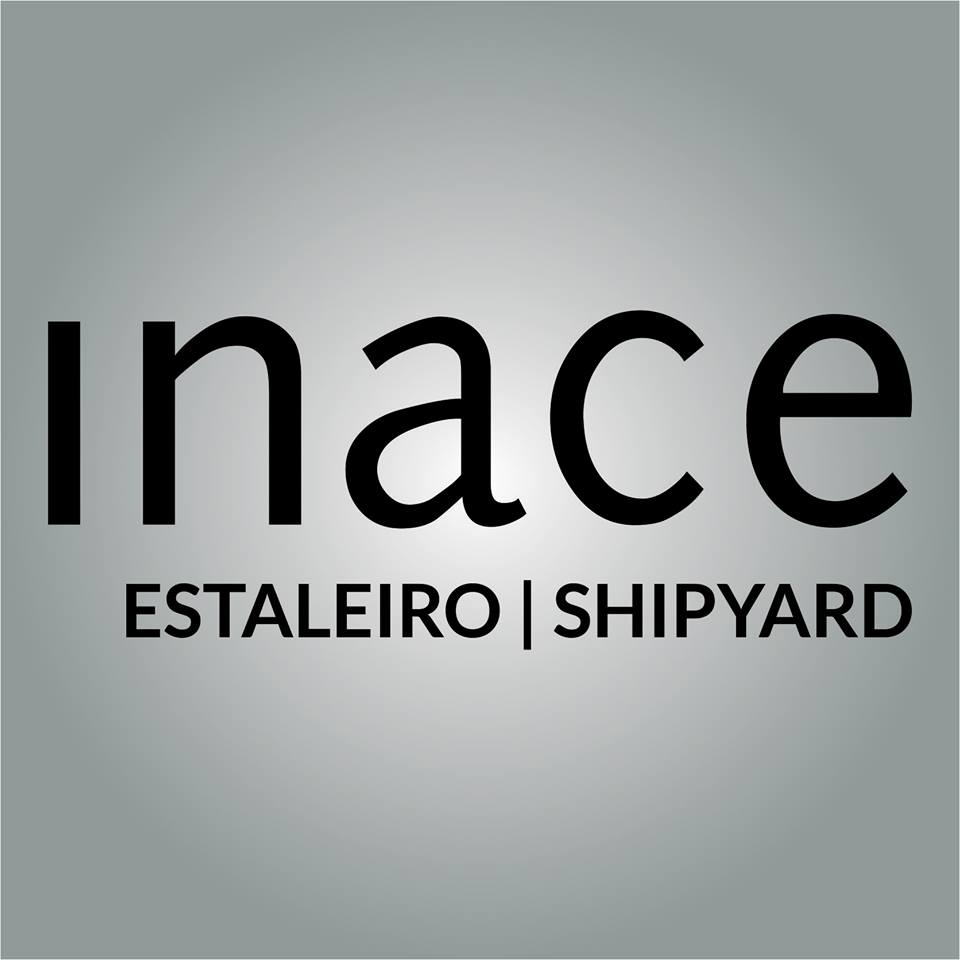
- Native name: Portuguese: Indústria Naval do Ceará S.A.
- Type: S.A.
- Industry: Shipbuilding, Defence
- Founded: 1968; 58 years ago
- Founder: Gil Bezerra
- Headquarters: Fortaleza, Ceará, Brazil
- Number of locations: 1
- Area served: Americas
- Products: Patrol Boats, Fishing Vessels, Work boats, Platform supply vessels, Research vessels, Tugboats
- Services: Ship Construction
- Website: inace.com.br

Indústria Naval do Ceará (INACE) is a shipbuilding company based in Fortaleza, Brazil.

INACE was founded by Gil Bezerra in 1968 as a private shipyard. It produces and repairs research, fishing and tug vessels. It built Yachts and warships.

The company was the first to process aluminium hulls in Brazil. The yard constructed, converted or repaired over 1,000 ships, including fishing boats, tugs, pushers, barges, offshore support vessels, luxury yachts and patrol craft. The company invested in advanced computer aided design capabilities (CAD) and computer systems to support ship production, as well as in production equipment and tooling.

In 1987, the company entered the American market with the first of a six yacht series. After this, more than fifteen luxury yachts were delivered to USA, Canada and Europe, including the Joana II owned by the famous Formula One and CART champion Emerson Fittipaldi. INACE also and exported to US two 65 ft Buccaneer Class yachts.

The relationship between INACE and the Brazilian Navy is effective and close since the company was founded. In 1996, the company has been contracted to build two patrol craft of 240 ton, delivering the first ship (“Guanabara”) in July 1999 and the second (“Guarujá”) in November 1999. The Brazilian Navy acquired 12 ships at the same project, including the 6 constructed in Germany, and these two units made by INACE become the faster in their class.
