= Lobster War =

1961–63 dispute between Brazil and France

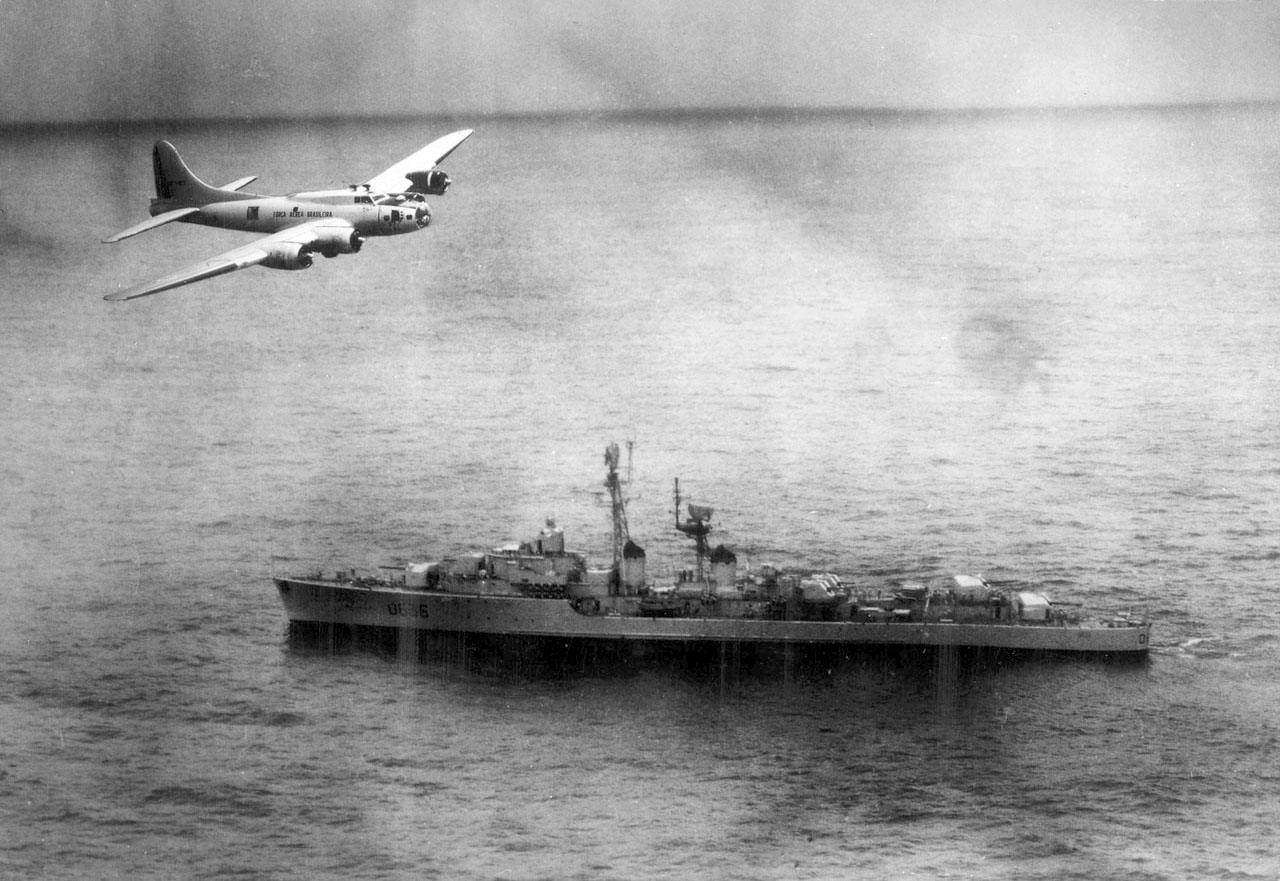
- A Brazilian Air Force Boeing B-17 Flying Fortress flying over the French escort vessel Tartu, off the coast of Brazil in 1963
Date	1961–1963
Location	Waters of Pernambuco, Brazil
Result	Peaceful resolution of the conflict: Withdrawal of French vessels; End of the mobilization of warships on both sides; Fishing authorization granted to French lobster fishing boats for five years if a portion was given to Brazilian lobster fishermen

Belligerents
Brazil	France

Commanders and leaders
Jânio Quadros; João Goulart; Ad. Arnoldo Toscano	Charles de Gaulle

Units involved
Brazilian Navy; Brazilian Air Force	French Navy

Strength
Brazilian Navy fleet in the dispute zone: 1 corvette: Ipiranga; 6 destroyers: Paraná; Babitonga; Pará; Acre; Araguari; Greenhalgh; 2 cruisers: Almirante Barroso; Tamandaré; 1 submarine: Riachuelo; Brazilian Air Force: 1 squadron: 5 B-17 Maritime Patrol; 1 squadron: 12 P-2 Neptune; 1 squadron: 4 S-2 Tracker	Offshore Brazil: First Escort squadron 1 destroyer: Tartu; 1 aviso: Paul Goffeny; Offshore West Africa: 1 aircraft carrier: Clemenceau; 1 cruiser: De Grasse; Second Escort squadron 7 destroyers: Cassard; Jauréguiberry; Picard; Le Gascon; L'Agenais; Le Béarnais; Le Vendéen; 1 tanker: La Baise

Casualties and losses
None	None

The Lobster War (also known as the Lobster Operation; Portuguese: Guerra da Lagosta; French: Conflit de la langouste) was a dispute over spiny lobsters that occurred from 1961 to 1963 between Brazil and France. The Brazilian government refused to allow French fishing vessels to catch spiny lobsters 160 kilometres (100 mi) off Brazil's northeastern coast by arguing that lobsters "crawl along the continental shelf". The French maintained that "lobsters swim" and so they could be caught by any fishing vessel from any country.

Although the historical incident of coercive diplomacy may have taken place long before the drafting of the United Nations Convention on the Law of the Sea, the dispute ended with the signing of an agreement on 10 December 1964 that granted to 26 French ships the right to fish for a period no longer than five years if they delivered to Brazilian fishermen a certain amount of profit from their fishing activities in the so-called "designated areas".

== Context ==
=== The lobster fishing crisis ===
In the early 1960s, France had lost almost all of its colonies on the African continent and consequently lost maritime areas where it exploited and dominated fishing. These losses, especially in Mauritania, put the French stock of lobsters in jeopardy.

==== Interest in the Brazilian Northeast ====
With the shortage, there was increased interest from fishermen at the fishing port of Camaret, on the northwest coast of France, in the Brazilian Northeast and the lobsters that inhabited there. The French then sent a delegation to Recife to conduct research on lobster nurseries. In March 1961, the authorization was issued and was valid for 180 days; however, only three vessels could be sent, following a French request. Moreover, the Brazilian government required representatives from the Brazilian Navy to board as inspectors. Thus, it didn't take long for the reports to show that instead of three, there were four fishing vessels in action. Furthermore, there was no research being conducted. The four boats were fishing and intended to take the lobsters to Europe. (Note: They settled on a spot off the coast of Brazil at which lobsters are found on submerged ledges at depths of 75–200 m (246–656 ft).)

In November of the same year, France requested authorization again, now with João Goulart as the nation's president, as Jânio Quadros had resigned a month earlier. The authorization was granted, and as before, the French continued fishing and were expelled from the Brazilian maritime territory. From then on, vessels began to be seized – but were soon released without further consequences.

Since local fishermen complained that large boats were coming from France to catch lobster off the state of Pernambuco, Brazilian Admiral Arnoldo Toscano ordered two corvettes to sail to the area of the French fishing boats. Seeing that the fishermen's claim was justifiable, the captain of the Brazilian vessel then demanded for the French boats to recede to deeper water and to leave the continental shelf to smaller Brazilian vessels.

=== Diplomatic battle ===
Throughout 1962, a diplomatic dispute between the two countries ensued. Brazil claimed that the lobsters were in the exclusive economic zone of the country, while France relied on the 1958 Geneva Convention, which established guidelines for high seas fishing, even though neither country had signed the convention. Early in the year, the Brazilian corvette Ipiranga seized the fishing vessel Cassiopée, 16 km (10 mi) off the northeast coast.

During the negotiations, to establish a form of modus vivendi regarding the crustacean, France argued that the lobster moved from one place to another by jumping and, therefore, should be considered as a fish and not a resource of the continental shelf. According to Commander Paulo de Castro, of the Brazilian Navy, the argument was weak and, sarcastically, he quipped:

By analogy, if a lobster is a fish because it moves by jumping, then a kangaroo is a bird.

==== Brazilian response ====
With the continued arrival of fishing boats on the Brazilian coast aiming to fish for lobsters, Admiral Arnoldo Toscano, given the reports from fishermen from Pernambuco, decided to send corvettes from the Navy to the region to escort the French out of Brazilian territory. The aircraft carrier Minas Gerais, the star of the Navy at the time, was not sent towards the disputed waters, generating criticism of the government by the population. However, the use of an aircraft carrier would not be necessary in the conflict.

==== French response ====
When peacefully approached by Brazilian warships, the fishermen, instead of ceasing their illegal activities, requested help from the French government, especially the French Navy, which promptly responded.

At the time, the leader of the French was the former general and war hero Charles de Gaulle, known for being nationalist, and conservative. In his third year as president, De Gaulle sent destroyers and an aircraft carrier of the Clemenceau-class to the Atlantic Ocean to escort the fishing boats in their unauthorized activities from Brazilian warships.

The same day, Brazilian Foreign Minister Hermes Lima considered the French approach as an act of hostility: "The attitude of France is inadmissible, and our government will not retreat. The lobster will not be caught." He called a secret meeting with his assistants to review the latest developments in the lobster war against France.

== Incident ==
On 11 February 1963, a Task Force led by the aircraft carrier Clemenceau departed from Toulon, France, along with three destroyers, five frigates, one cruiser, one tanker and one dispatch boat. The explanation given by the French government was that it was just another routine mission in the Atlantic Ocean. On 21 February, these ships arrived in Dakar, Senegal and later headed to Abidjan, in the Ivory Coast. However, one of the Clemenceau escorts took a different course. The destroyer Tartu headed alone to the Brazilian coast. (Note: On 21 February 1963, a task force from Toulon followed, headed by the aircraft carrier Clemenceau and followed by the cruisers De Grasse, Cassard, Jauréguiberry, the destroyer Tartu, the corvettes Le Picard, Le Gascon, L'Agenais, Le Béarnais and Le Vendéen (all T52 class) and the tanker La Baïse and Paul Goffeny. Initially, it was to be only "one more commission" off the west coast of Africa to show the flag and to perform routine exercises.)

From the moment the Navy General Staff (EMA) learned of the movement of a French warship to the Brazilian coast, a search for the vessel began. High-Frequency radiogoniometric stations in Recife and Bahia began tracking the electromagnetic emissions of all French ships sailing in the Atlantic Ocean.

The Brazilian government responded by mobilizing a large contingent of the Navy and Air Force, in preparation for war, on 22 February, on the eve of Carnival. During the mobilization, the US intervened, reminding that the licenses for US equipment used by the Brazilians – such as the B-17 – did not allow them to be used against opponents.

=== First radar contact with the Tartu ===
On 26 February, a P-15 of the Brazilian Air Force (FAB), patrolling far from the coast, detected on radar a large ship heading towards Fernando de Noronha. The next day, a FAB reconnaissance B-17 took the first photos of the French ship which, from then on, would receive constant daytime and nighttime visits from Brazilian military aircraft. Poggio (2011) describes:

Two aircraft flew in open formation at low altitude with all lights off and total radio silence. For the target approach, they used passive electronic warfare equipment, which detected emissions from the Tartu's radar air search. Near the ship, the planes closed formation and descended to 100 ft (about 30 metres) of altitude until, practically over the destroyer, they turned on everything that could illuminate it. It was a total surprise, and men could be seen running on deck, as if taking combat positions.

=== Response of the Brazilian Navy ===
Days earlier, when the conflict broke out, Brazil was on holiday, and much of the military personnel of the navy were on leave, requiring a major call-up in the early hours of Carnival Saturday. Moreover, the units in Recife were lacking ammunition and fuel.

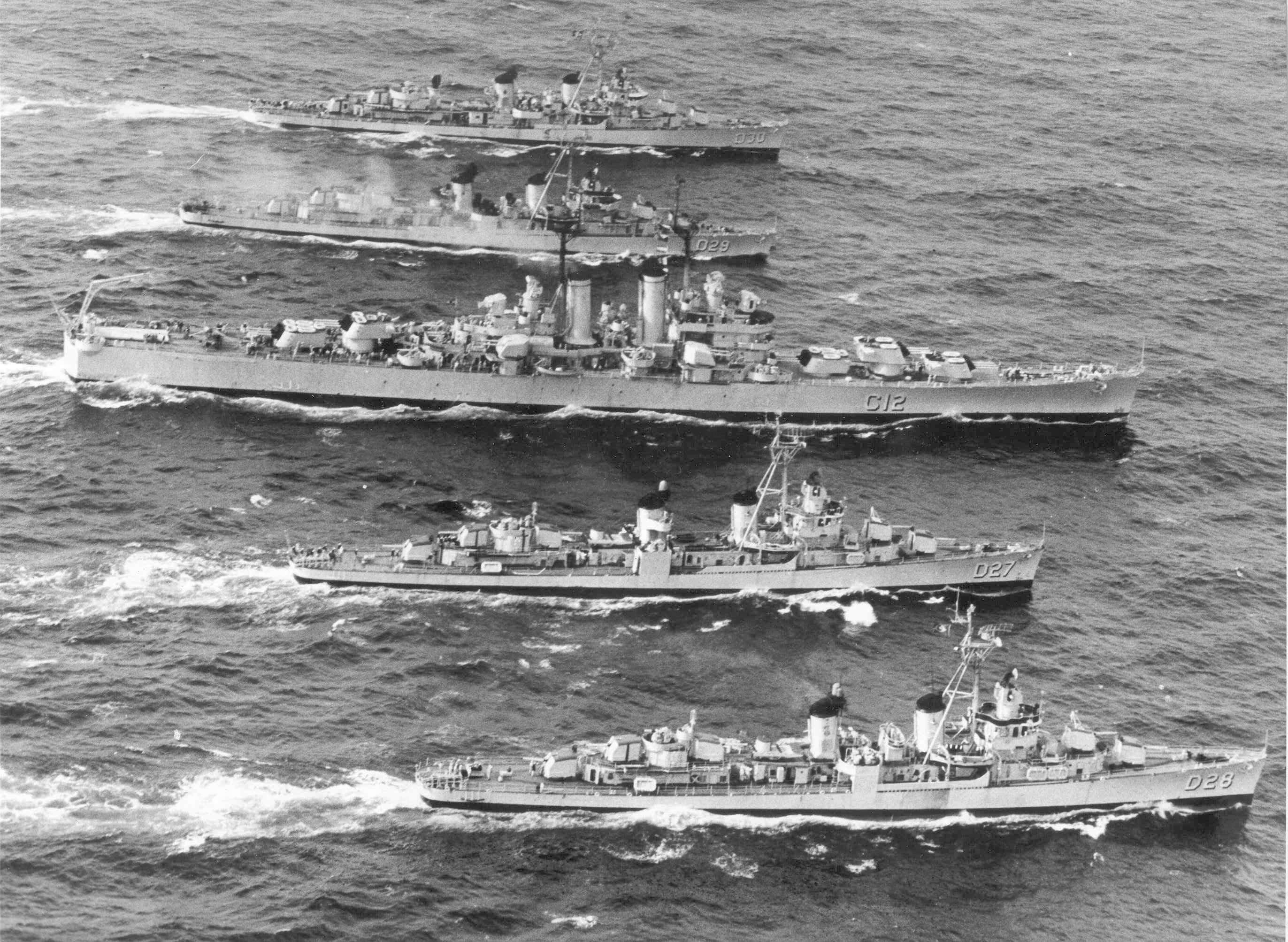
Brazilian warships photographed during the conflict

In Rio de Janeiro, a large Task Force of warships set sail for the capital of Pernambuco. Three days later, the Force arrived in Recife, joining other reinforcements from various parts of the country, and on the same day headed to the open sea, with great anticipation from the press and the public regarding the meeting of the Brazilian ships with the French one.

==== Encounter at sea ====
On board the Brazilian ships, the tension was high. The ships sailed in the dark and the radar operators were fully focused on searching for the enemy ship. The next day at 10:00, the destroyer Paraná made radar contact with a surface target matching the Tartu.

At 13 kilometers away, the Paraná spotted the ship, along with six small fishing boats stopped beside it. The Brazilian ship was also not alone: in escort, there were four more destroyers, one corvette and one submarine. The fleet followed the French ships for some time and monitored radio frequencies, then moved away. From the location, a patrol schedule was established to always keep a ship close to the fishing boats and another at a distance, able to intervene when necessary.

To secure Tartu's position, another destroyer, Paul Gaufeny, was sent to the region, totaling 2 warships and 6 French fishing boats.

=== Withdrawal of ships from the Brazilian coast ===
In the meantime, diplomatic talks and the interference of the United States and the UN sought to end the imminent conflict and, consequently, the declaration of war. The return of the fishing boats and the two destroyers to France was a sign that the conflict was over, with a final, ironic, and humorous signal of “safe travels” sent from the destroyer Paraná to the ship Paul Gaufeny.

== Outcome ==
On 10 March 1963, the French withdrew their ships from the coast, but the diplomatic war had not yet ceased. Before the situation was concluded, a military coup occurred. It was during the dictatorship, on 10 December 1964, that Brazil and France reached a solution: an agreement allowing the exploitation of lobsters by French ships, in limited quantity and time, sharing the profits. Finally, the conflict of interests was resolved through diplomacy.

== Tribunal acts ==
=== On the scientific thesis ===
On 6 July 1966, the Administrative Tribunal of Rennes summarized the French government's claims that lobsters are like fish and that since they swim about in the open sea, they could not be considered part of the continental shelf. Brazil claimed that lobsters are like oysters in that they cling to the bottom of the ocean and so were part of the continental shelf. Admiral Paulo Moreira da Silva, Brazil's Navy expert in the field of oceanography who had been sent to assist the diplomatic committee during the general discussions, argued that for Brazil to accept the French scientific thesis that a lobster would be considered a fish when it "leaps" on the seafloor, it would be required in the same way to accept the Brazilian premise that when a kangaroo "hops", it would be considered a bird.

=== On shipowner claims ===
It was also observed that the claims of Celton and Stephan, two of the shipowners who sought compensation from France for losses occurred during the January–March 1963 fishing season, had no right to any compensation at all once the French government could not be held responsible for the unsuccessful seizure because of the unilateral position by the Brazilian government.

Decisions of the Conseil d'État then dismissed the allegations that the French government had authorized the plaintiff shipowners to send their vessels to go fish for lobsters on high seas or to off the coast of Brazil. It stated that the licenses given to the plaintiffs accorded to the masters of the vessels and not to the shipowners. The derogation was decided to have authorized the masters to exercise full command of their vessels for fishing on high seas, not in a particular zone. There is no evidence that the French government had authorized such actions and so their claims were rejected.

== See also ==
- Brazil–France relations
- Cod Wars
- Turbot War
- 1993 Cherbourg incident
- French invasions in Brazil
