= Imperial Marinheiro =

Imperial Marinheiro may refer to:

- Brazilian ship Imperial Marinheiro, multiple ships
- Imperial Marinheiro-class corvette, a Brazilian class of corvettes

== See also ==
- Marinheiro
