= USS Benham (DD-796) =

Fletcher-class destroyer

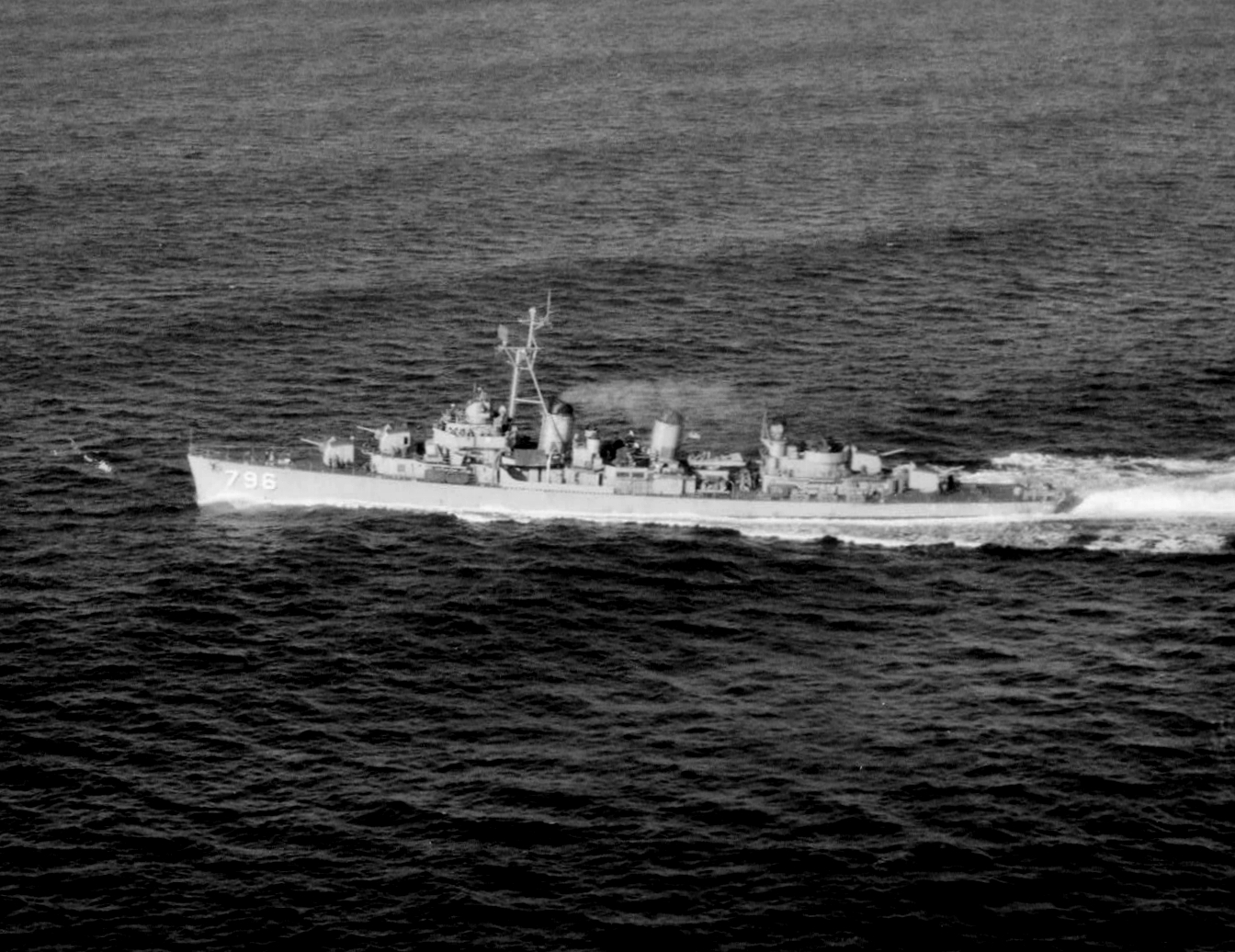

History

United States
- Name: Benham
- Namesake: Andrew E. K. Benham
- Builder: Bethlehem Steel Company, Staten Island
- Laid down: 23 April 1943
- Launched: 30 August 1943
- Commissioned: 20 December 1943 to 18 October 1946; 24 March 1951 to 30 June 1960
- Stricken: 15 January 1974
- Fate: Loaned to Peru, 15 December 1960
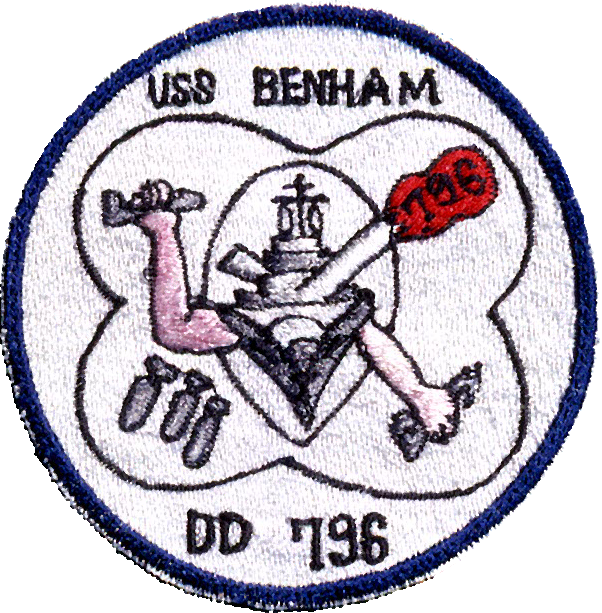
- Badge

Peru
- Name: Villar
- Acquired: 15 December 1960
- Identification: DD-71
- Fate: Scrapped, 1980

General characteristics
- Class & type: Fletcher-class destroyer
- Displacement: 2,050 tons
- Length: 376 ft 6 in (114.76 m)
- Beam: 39 ft (12 m)
- Draft: 17 ft 9 in (5.41 m)
- Propulsion: 60,000 shp (45,000 kW); geared turbines; 2 propellers
- Speed: 38 knots (70 km/h; 44 mph)
- Range: 6,500 nmi (12,000 km; 7,500 mi) at 15 kn (28 km/h; 17 mph)
- Complement: 329
- Armament: 5 × single Mk 12 5 in (127 mm)/38 guns; 5 × twin 40 mm (1.6 in) Bofors AA guns; 7 × single 20 mm (0.8 in) Oerlikon AA guns; 2 × quintuple 21 in (533 mm) torpedo tubes; 6 × single depth charge throwers; 2 × depth charge racks

USS Benham (DD-796) was a Fletcher-class destroyer in service with the United States Navy from 1943 to 1946 and from 1951 to 1960. She was then transferred to Peru where she served as BAP Villar (DD-71) until being scrapped in 1980.

== Service history ==
Benham was the third ship of the U.S. Navy to be named for Rear Admiral Andrew E. K. Benham (1832–1905). She was launched on 30 August 1943 by Bethlehem Steel Company, Staten Island, New York; sponsored by Mrs. Harold Benham, wife of a grandson of Rear Admiral Benham; and commissioned on 20 December 1943.

=== World War II ===
==== 1944 ====
After fitting out at New York, Benham conducted her initial shakedown training in Long Island Sound before sailing southeast to Bermuda in early January 1944. After arriving in Kingston, Jamaica on 14 January, she carried out four weeks of shore bombardment, anti-submarine, and carrier escort exercises before returning to New York on 13 February. Following post-shakedown availability, she proceeded to Norfolk, Virginia on 28 February, joined with Piedmont, and escorted the destroyer tender through the Panama Canal to Hawaii, arriving at Pearl Harbor on 27 March.

Benham then conducted destroyer type training—carrier screen exercises, antiaircraft gunnery practice, and antisubmarine drills—in preparation for Operation Forager, the planned invasion of the Marianas. On 24 April, however, the destroyer collided with Uhlmann during a night screening exercise, causing extensive damage to her bow. Given the priority accorded "Forager" preparations, Benham's repairs proved slow, and the warship did not return to duty until 14 May.

On 29 May, Benham joined Task Group 52.11 (TG 52.11), comprising Kitkun Bay, Gambier Bay, Laws, and Morrison, and sailed for Eniwetok, arriving there a week later. Steaming to Saipan in the Marianas on 15 June, Benham screened the two escort carriers as they launched air strikes against Japanese ground troops ashore. After hearing reports of a large enemy naval force from the Philippines headed toward the Marianas, the fast carriers—which had also been flying ground support missions—moved west to fight and win the Battle of the Philippine Sea on 19 and 20 June. Meanwhile, the American troops ashore had to rely on the seven escort carriers of TG 52.1 for any close air support.

The first Japanese counterattack around Saipan took place on the night of 15 June when three small air raids attacked TG 52.1. Although none closed Benham that night, a strike by a dozen or so Aichi D3A "Val" dive bombers attacked the escort carriers at dusk on 17 June. Benham joined in the ensuing antiaircraft barrage, helping to shoot down two of the attackers without loss. The following day, several more raids closed the task group; but combat air patrol (CAP) fighters drove off the attackers.

The destroyer remained with the escort carriers until 2 July when she shifted to the screening and fire support group (TG 52.12) to back up mopping-up operations on Saipan. After that island was secured on the 10th, the destroyer got underway for Eniwetok, arriving there on 16 July. She quickly loaded supplies and ammunition for the next phase of the operation and escorted a convoy of assault troops from Eniwetok to Tinian, arriving off that island on 19 July.

For the next four days, Benham screened troop transports at sea while other warships conducted gunfire missions against enemy forces on Tinian. After the landings on 24 July, the destroyer spent the rest of the month firing at targets around Sunharon town during the day and covering Marine Corps battalions with defensive gunfire at night. Benham also closed the island in the evenings to fire interdiction missions and pound enemy gun emplacements. On 6 August, the destroyer shifted to Guam and spent four days bombarding the last Japanese positions on the northeast corner of the island. With the island declared secure on 10 August, Benham steamed east to Eniwetok for repairs alongside a tender.

As part of the preliminaries to the invasion of the Philippines, the fast carriers were ordered to attack Japanese air strength in the Bonins and the Palaus and on Yap and Mindanao. On 28 August, in company with TG 38.2—consisting of Intrepid, Hancock, Bunker Hill, Cabot, Independence, two battleships, four cruisers, and seventeen other destroyers—Benham steamed west for a large raid on the Palaus. She screened the carriers during attacks there between 6 and 8 September and against Japanese airfields near Sarangani Bay on Mindanao in the Philippines on 9 and 10 September. Returning to the Palaus on 15 September, the destroyer screened the carriers as they flew strikes in support of the landings on Peleliu and Angaur. After a final series of strikes against airfields on Luzon between 21 and 24 September, the task force steamed to Ulithi on 29 September to rearm and refuel.

On 6 October, TG 38.2 put to sea and joined the three other carrier groups of Task Force 38 (TF 38). Then, the entire task force steamed northwest for raids on the Ryukyu Islands, Formosa, and the Philippines. Benham screened Bunker Hill during the strikes on Okinawa and the smaller Ryūkyūs on 10 October. A diversionary raid on Aparri in the Philippines followed on 11 October, and then a large-scale effort to destroy Japanese air power on Formosa began on 12 October.

Although the American attacks neutralized much of the defending Japanese planes on that island, the task force was plagued by night harassing attacks from Mitsubishi G4M "Betty" twin-engine bombers operating out of Kyūshū. Over two nights of attacks, Benham's gunners helped splash nine enemy planes and chalked up a tenth as "probable." The task force then slowly steamed east, covering the retirement of Canberra—heavily damaged by a Japanese torpedo—before striking at Japanese installations in the Philippines starting on 15 October. These attacks, intended to clear the way for an American amphibious landing, continued until 20 October when the first troops landed on Leyte.

Detached from the main body on 24 October, Benham escorted Bunker Hill to Manus Island in the Admiralties for repairs. She therefore missed the series of major engagements in and around the Philippines on 24 and 25 October known as the Battle for Leyte Gulf. Meanwhile, after a brief refit at Manus, the destroyer steamed to Saipan where she rejoined the carrier task force for operations in early November. Arriving off Luzon on 11 November, Benham helped screen the carriers as they provided air support for Leyte ground operations. These continued until 22 November, when the fast carriers returned to Ulithi.

The task force returned to the Philippines on 10 December, this time to support landings on Mindanao. As Japanese air attacks had slackened off by this time, the most notable event to the ships of the task force was a typhoon that swept through the area on 18 December. Caught in the center of the storm, Benham found herself faced with stack-high seas and 100 kn (190 km/h) winds that sent her laboring greatly. More seriously, water flooding through the ventilators shorted out her switchboards, the vent fans failed, and the crew had to bail free water in the extreme heat below decks. After five hours of punishing weather, the worst of the storm passed; and the warship limped to Ulithi for repairs. There, the crew heard the news that the storm had sunk three other destroyers and damaged at least 27 other ships.

==== 1945 ====
Just over a week later, Benham got underway again, this time with TG 38.1, built around Yorktown, Wasp, Cowpens and Monterey. These fast carriers struck at Formosa on 3 and 4 January 1945 in preparation for Operation "Musketeer," the landings on Luzon in the Philippines. On 6 and 7 January, while the American invasion forces suffered under enemy air attacks in the South China Sea and at Lingayen Gulf, the fast carriers retaliated against airfields on Luzon in a successful attempt to suppress these Japanese strikes. After refueling at sea, TF 38 conducted a final raid against Formosa on the 9th.

In an effort to secure the American supply line between Mindoro and Lingayan Gulf, TF 38 steamed through the Luzon Strait into the South China Sea to strike at nearby Japanese defensive installations and shipping. Although plagued by bad weather, the American carriers raided Japanese shipping along the coast of Indochina on 12 January and struck at airfields and ports on Formosa, Hainan, and in China on the 15th and 16. After a brief excursion north to fly photographic missions over Okinawa, the task force returned to Ulithi on 27 January.

With operations on Mindoro and Luzon well underway, the destroyer's crew received two weeks of rest while the fast carriers geared up for their next mission, a major raid on the Japanese home islands. On 10 February, after the carrier force departed Ulithi, Benham and 14 other destroyers formed a scouting and picket line about 35 miles (65 km) ahead of the carriers. Intended to destroy enemy surface pickets and provide early warning for the carriers, the destroyers screened the fast carriers during their air strikes on Honshū on 16 and 17 February. During these operations, the destroyers vectored in combat air patrol (CAP) against enemy "snoopers", helping to splash eight. The task force turned south the next day and began strikes on Iwo Jima in support of the amphibious landings on the 19th. After a second strike on Honshū on 25 and 26 February, the warships returned to Ulithi at the beginning of March.

On 13 March, Benham embarked upon the last major amphibious operation of the war, the invasion of Okinawa. In company with other destroyers in the screen, she covered the carriers during the American attacks on the Kyūshū airfields and enemy naval installations on the shores of the Inland Sea. The destroyer made her first radar contact with enemy "snoopers" on 17 March and fired on, and drove off, a Mitsubishi A6M Zero fighter that closed her position the following morning. The action continued on 19 March, when Benham and Halsey Powell made a submarine contact at 02:50. Over the next four hours, both destroyers exhausted their depth charges on the target but did not sink the Japanese submarine. The destroyer then collected survivors from Franklin—heavily damaged by a kamikaze on 19 March—and delivered them to Wasp.

On 31 March, Cushing obtained a sonar contact and made a depth-charge attack on a suspected Japanese submarine. Benham's crew reported an oil slick and a strong odor of diesel fuel afterwards, but again there were no firm results. On 6 April, five days after landings began on Okinawa, Japanese air activity increased dramatically as they launched the first of their massed kamikaze attacks against American forces in and around the Ryūkyūs. Although these massive raids plagued picket destroyers elsewhere, Benham suffered no direct attacks during this initial foray. At 09:44 on 17 April, however, four Zeros closed her position. One strafed Colahan, pulled up, and then dove straight at Benham. Although antiaircraft fire from several destroyers splashed the plane about 50 feet (15 m) astern, the Zero disintegrated in a large explosion that, in conjunction with antiaircraft fire from adjacent ships, killed one sailor, wounded 14, and knocked out the destroyer's radar.

After temporary repairs, Benham spent the rest of April and early May at sea, helping to protect American forces operating in and around Okinawa. After a brief repair period at Ulithi in mid-May, she once again screened the fast carriers during the naval air strikes against Kyūshū and Nansei Shoto in early June. The warship retired to Leyte on 13 June, intending to conduct a quick replenishment there but was diverted to Guam for more serious repairs on her engineering plant.

Rejoining TF 38 on 21 July, Benham stayed with the fast carriers for the next four weeks, screening them during 24 and 28 July strikes on the Inland Sea, the attacks on Kobe and Nagoya on 30 July, and the final strikes on Honshū and the Tokyo plain in mid-August. During these operations, Benham carried out varied duties including an anti-shipping sweep off Shikoku, a shore bombardment against the naval seaplane base at Shionomisaki, and even shuttle missions ferrying British liaison officers between British and American aircraft carriers.

Following the announcement of the Japanese surrender on 15 August, the destroyer patrolled off the home islands until 27 August, when she joined the long line of ships entering Sagami Wan to receive the surrender of the Yokosuka Naval Base. After a brief trip to Iwo Jima to pick up several million yen of military currency for use in Japan, the destroyer took up station near the port bow of Missouri for the official surrender ceremony on 2 September. The warship remained in Japanese waters until 26 October when she sailed for home. Benham spent the next year at various ports on the west coast until finally decommissioning on 18 October 1946. She was assigned to the Pacific Reserve Fleet at San Diego, California

=== 1951–1960 ===
In 1951, owing to the Korean War and the ensuing requirement for more warships in service, Benham was recommissioned at Long Beach, California, on 24 March 1951. After steaming to the east coast, by way of the Panama Canal, she underwent an extensive overhaul at the Boston Naval Shipyard. Among other modernization efforts, her old 40-millimeter guns were replaced by newer 3-inch (76 mm) guns—thought to be more capable against jet aircraft. Assigned to the Atlantic Fleet, with her home port at Newport, Rhode Island, the destroyer conducted shakedown operations and training exercises along the east coast for the rest of that year.

Benham began her first overseas Atlantic deployment the next spring, sailing on a European goodwill cruise on 22 April 1952. In company with Noa, the warship visited ports in Newfoundland, Iceland, Ireland, England, Sweden, Germany, Libya, and Italy before returning home on 16 September. Following six months of antisubmarine exercises and type training out of Newport, she got underway for a second Mediterranean deployment on 17 April 1953. This cruise, which lasted for five months, took her to Italy, France, Turkey, and Greece. Returning to the east coast on 3 September, she entered the Philadelphia Naval Shipyard for a four-month modernization overhaul. Upon leaving the shipyard in January 1954, she spent the next five months conducting training exercises along the east coast in preparation for a world cruise.

Departing Newport on 1 June, Benham and the rest of Destroyer Division 242 (DesDiv 242) steamed south, passed through the Panama Canal, and crossed the Pacific Ocean to Japan. There, she spent several months training and patrolling with the 7th Fleet. One such patrol took place in the South China Sea after two Chinese communist Lavochkin La. 7 fighters shot down an Air Cathay passenger airplane in late July, killing half of the 18 passengers on board. On 25 July, while Benham searched for survivors, two Chinese fighters attacked nearby American fighters and were promptly splashed for their troubles. The destroyer also conducted antisubmarine training exercises with friendly submarines off Okinawa. Following a two-week yard period at Sasebo, Japan, the destroyer sailed for home in October. She visited Hong Kong and Singapore first, then sailed into the Indian Ocean before stopping at Ceylon and Aden. Other port visits included Naples, Barcelona, Gibraltar, and the Azores before she finally arrived in Newport on 18 December.

After a short leave and upkeep period, she spent most of 1955 conducting brief training missions out of Newport for the Atlantic Fleet antisubmarine and destroyer force commands. On 7 January 1956, Benham entered the Boston Naval Shipyard for another modernization overhaul. She then spent the summer serving as a school ship at Newport, helping to train prospective commanding officers and engineers. In September, the destroyer entered the Philadelphia Naval Shipyard for a two-week availability period. Then, given the growing tensions in the Middle East over the Egyptian nationalization of the Suez Canal, her crew began intensive training exercises out of Newport in preparation for a possible emergency deployment. On 29 October, Israeli forces attacked Egyptian forces in the Sinai, followed two days later by British and French air strikes on British and French paratroopers dropped on Port Said, the start of a larger operation to seize the entire Suez Canal. The next day, however, the Soviet Union declared its intentions to support Egypt in this conflict.

In response, on the morning 6 November, President Dwight D. Eisenhower put all American warships on alert; and some, including Benham, received orders to reinforce the 6th Fleet in the Mediterranean. The destroyer got underway that same day and, after a non-stop 16-day voyage, arrived in the eastern Mediterranean on 22 November. There, she helped protect the deployment to Egypt of an emergency force under the auspices of United Nations. Benham also helped cover the slow withdraw of British, French, and Israeli forces from the Suez Canal region.

With the crisis over, the warship departed for home on 11 February 1957, reaching Newport on 20 February. Soon thereafter, she returned to a regular schedule of training missions off the east coast. Following three months of local exercises out of Newport, the destroyer conducted a midshipman summer cruise to South America in June and July visiting Rio de Janeiro, Brazil; St. Thomas, Virgin Islands; Guantánamo Bay, Cuba; and Culebra, Puerto Rico. In September, Benham steamed northeast from Newport for a series of NATO antisubmarine exercises in the North Atlantic. After these operations, the crew spent two days in Belfast, Northern Ireland, and Chatham, England, before returning to Newport. Moving to Boston for a three-month yard period in January 1958, the crew helped prepare the destroyer for another Mediterranean deployment later that spring.

In the Middle East, meanwhile, the specter of civil war loomed in Lebanon following a Muslim uprising in Beirut in early May. The government of President Camille Chamoun appealed to Britain and the United States for aid. Although wary of becoming involved, President Eisenhower authorized the positioning of a rapid reaction force in the region. On 14 July, following a coup in Iraq, Eisenhower authorized intervention in Lebanon in an attempt to contain the spread of unrest. Some 10,000 marines began landing in Lebanon on the following day. As part of the American response to this crisis, Benham hurriedly deployed to the Mediterranean, sailing for southern Europe from Newport on 14 July. Over the next four months, the warship served in the Mediterranean, the Red Sea, and the Persian Gulf, supporting American troops as they helped restore order in Lebanon.

After the last troops evacuated Beirut on 25 October, she sailed for home, arriving late in November and remaining in port for the rest of the 1958. During 1959, in addition to her normal training routine out of Newport, Benham conducted two major exercises, a carrier familiarization cruise off Mayport, Florida, that spring and an antisubmarine training voyage to the Caribbean that summer. Tapped for foreign transfer under the Military Assistance Program (MAP), the warship moved to the Boston Naval Shipyard in early 1960 for repairs and a substantial overhaul.

Benham was decommissioned at Boston on 30 June 1960. The destroyer was then transferred to Peru as a loan under the Military Assistance Program (MAP) on 15 December 1960. On 15 January 1974, Benham's name was struck from the Naval Vessel Register, and she was sold to the government of Peru that same day.

=== BAP Villar (DD-71) ===
The ship served in the Peruvian Navy as BAP Villar (DD-71) until scrapped in 1980. Before being scrapped Villar was used as a target for Exocet missiles from BAP Ferré.

== Awards ==
Benham (DD-796) earned eight battle stars for World War II service.
