= USS Uhlmann =

Fletcher-class destroyer

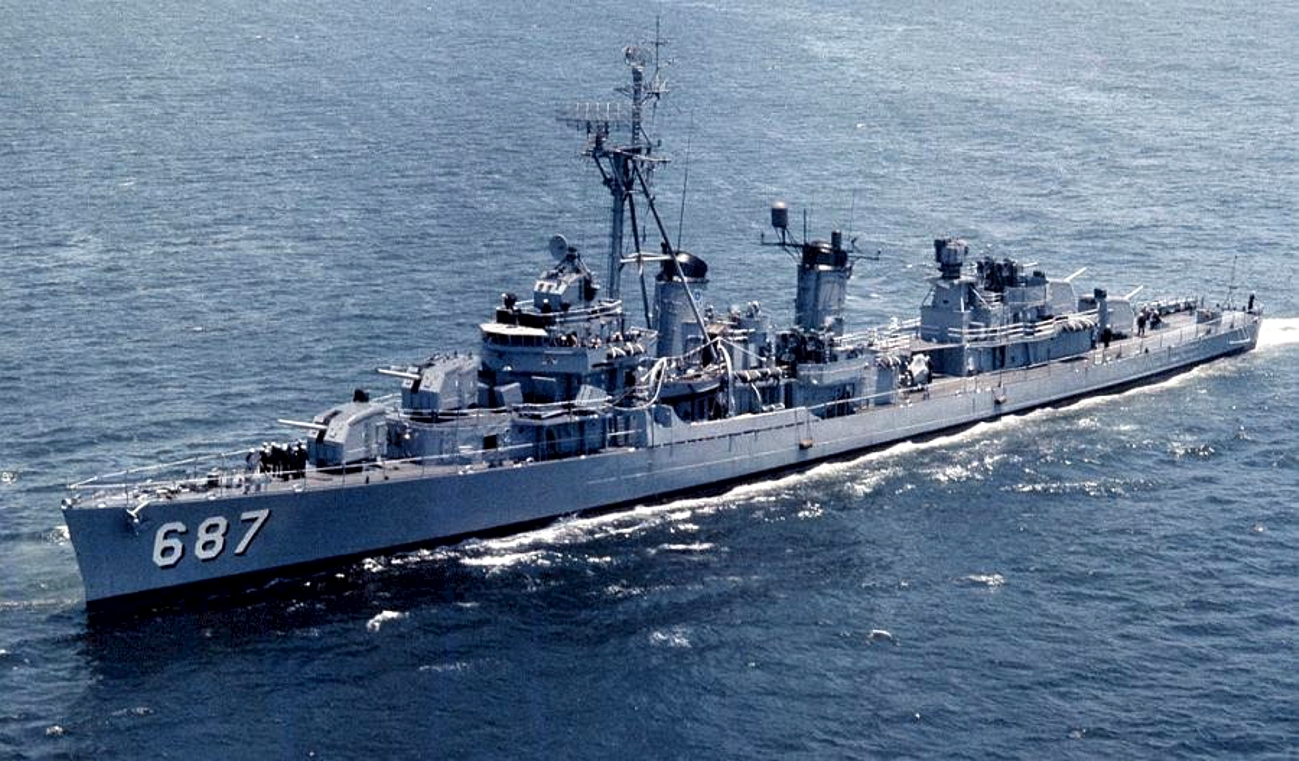

History

United States
- Name: USS Uhlmann
- Namesake: Robert W. Uhlmann
- Builder: Bethlehem Mariners Harbor, Staten Island
- Laid down: 6 March 1943
- Launched: 30 July 1943
- Commissioned: 22 November 1943 to 14 June 1946; 23 May 1950 to 15 July 1972
- Stricken: 15 July 1972
- Fate: Sold 21 March 1974, scrapped

General characteristics
- Class & type: Fletcher-class destroyer
- Displacement: 2,050 tons
- Length: 376 ft 5 in (114.73 m)
- Beam: 39 ft 7 in (12.07 m)
- Draft: 17 ft 9 in (5.41 m)
- Propulsion: 60,000 shp (45,000 kW); 2 propellers
- Speed: 35 knots (65 km/h; 40 mph)
- Complement: 329
- Armament: 5 × 5 in (127 mm)/38 cal. guns; 10 × 40 mm (1.6 in) guns; 7 × 20 mm (0.79 in) guns; 10 × 21 inch (533 mm) torpedo tubes; 6 × depth charge projectors; 2 × depth charge racks

USS Uhlmann (DD-687) was a Fletcher-class destroyer in the service of the United States Navy from 1943 to 1946 and from 1950 to 1972. She was scrapped in 1974.

== Namesake ==
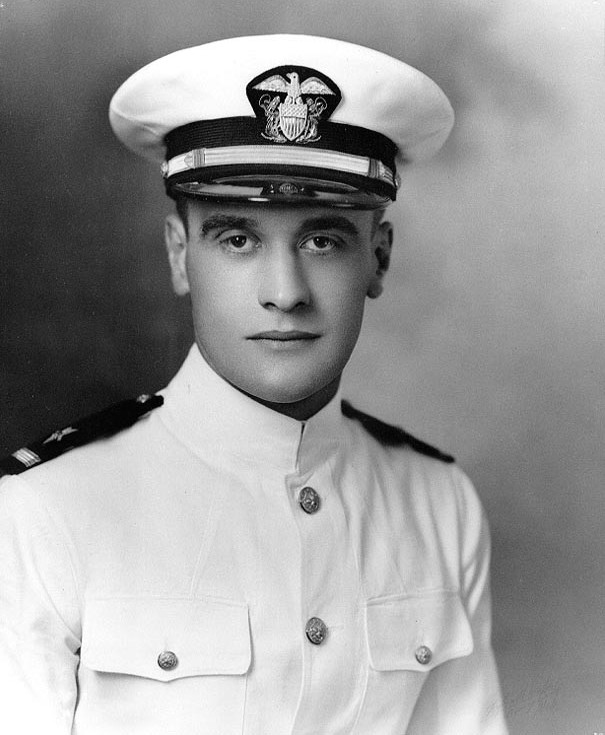
Robert W. Uhlmann in 1941

Robert William Uhlmann was born on 16 August 1919 at Pittsburgh, Pennsylvania. He attended the College of Engineering, University of Michigan, from 1937 until 1940. In September 1940, he enlisted in the United States Naval Reserve as an apprentice seaman and, during November and December, trained on the USS Arkansas. Following his appointment as a midshipman in the Naval Reserve on 17 March 1941, he trained at the Midshipman School, Northwestern University, Chicago, Illinois and on 12 June 1941 was commissioned ensign. After additional training, he reported to Patrol Squadron 24 on 1 August 1941. This squadron, a part of Patrol Wing 2 stationed at Naval Air Station Kaneohe Bay, was redesignated Patrol Squadron 12 (VP-12) in October 1941.

On the morning of 7 December 1941, during the Attack on Pearl Harbor, nine Imperial Japanese Navy fighters circled low over the airfield at Kaneohe and then attacked, machine-gunning the control tower and leaving planes in flames in the bay and on the ramp. The men of VP-12 returned fire with only rifles and machine guns. A short time later, a second wave of enemy planes flew over, bombing hangars and planes and destroying the hangar where many members of VP-12 were obtaining replenishment ammunition for machine guns. Additional strafing attacks followed; and, before the morning was over, eight patrol bomber seaplanes were destroyed, and all 35 planes which had been on the ground when the attack began were out of commission. Air station personnel shot down two Japanese planes and scored hits on the fuel tanks of seven others. Uhlmann was killed in the attack.

== Service history ==
Uhlmann was laid down on 6 March 1943 at Staten Island, New York, by the Bethlehem Steel Co. and launched on 30 July 1943; sponsored by Mrs. C. F. Uhlmann, mother of Ens. Uhlmann. The ship was commissioned on 22 November 1943 at the Brooklyn Navy Yard, Commander Selden G. Hooper in command.

=== 1944 ===
After shakedown out of Bermuda and post-shakedown availability, the destroyer joined Destroyer Squadron 56 on 24 January 1944. Two days later, she got underway to escort Wasp to Trinidad. She then transited the Panama Canal, touched at San Diego, California, and arrived at San Francisco, California on 16 February. There, she embarked passengers for transportation to Hawaii and departed the west coast on 17 February in company with Birmingham and Newcomb.

She arrived at Pearl Harbor on 23 February. During March, Uhlmann underwent availability, conducted training, and rendered occasional convoy screening services in Hawaiian waters. In April, she conducted carrier escort training exercises and honed her skills in shore bombardment and radar tracking in preparation for assignment to carrier screening duties. Two hours after sunset on 24 April, while Uhlmann was participating in training exercises in Hawaiian waters as an antisubmarine screening ship for the carriers of Task Group 19.2, she was struck amidships by destroyer Benham. The collision tore an 8-by-10-foot (2.4 m × 3.0 m) hole in Uhlmann's hull below the water line, flooding her firerooms and the forward engine room. The following day, she was taken in tow by Tekesta and returned to Pearl Harbor on 26 April. After temporary hull and engine repairs, she set her course for San Francisco on 17 May, steaming on her port engine with her forward fire and engine rooms out of commission. On 24 May, she moored at Hunter's Point and, for the next two months, underwent extensive repairs.

In August, she returned to Pearl Harbor and resumed training exercises including torpedo firing and antisubmarine warfare drills. After one false start, she departed Oahu on 18 September with South Dakota and Woodworth and set her course for the Admiralty Islands. En route to Manus, she was diverted to the western Caroline Islands and reported to 3d Fleet at Ulithi on 30 September. During a typhoon on 3 October, a nest of three destroyers drifted down on Uhlmann and pierced three holes in her starboard side. A few hours later, the destroyer made an emergency sortie from the lagoon with Task Group 38.2; but, by nightfall, high seas had carried away her emergency damage control measures and flooded the anchor windlass room. She returned to Ulithi on 4 October for repairs by Dixie and, on 6 October, was underway for an at-sea rendezvous with Task Force 38—the 3d Fleet's Fast Carrier Force—the following day.

At noon on 9 October, the carriers began a high-speed approach to a launch position for strikes on the Ryukyus. On 10 October, planes launched by the carriers struck Okinawa, destroying enemy aircraft, shipping, and shore installations in preparation for the projected landings on Leyte, Cebu, and Negros.

After fueling at sea on 11 October, TF 38 began a high-speed approach on Taiwan for two days of strikes on that island, again in support of the impending American assault on the Philippines. On 12 and 13 October, as the carriers steamed 85 miles (137 km) east of Taiwan and launched strike after strike against that island, Uhlmann operated in their antiaircraft screen. Planes from the carriers attempted to destroy Japanese air strength on Taiwan to eliminate that island as a staging base for the enemy.

Shortly after dusk on 12 October, low flying Japanese bombers and torpedo planes approached Task Group 38.2 from the west and northwest. Although most of the Japanese planes were intercepted by the task force's combat air patrol, more than a dozen broke through and attacked the formation. Uhlmann opened fire on a Japanese medium torpedo bomber at 7,000 yards (6,400 m). However, undeterred, the plane continued to approach the zigzagging destroyer from port until it was hit at close range by Uhlmann's 40-millimeter fire, crossed over the ship, and splashed 100 yards (91 m) off the destroyer's starboard bow. The plane sank at once leaving a large quantity of gas and oil floating on the sea.

A second wave of attackers followed two minutes after the first, and Uhlmann, maneuvering with the formation, joined in the fire which downed some seven Japanese raiders during the night. At 2200, she hit an enemy plane which burst into flame and illuminated the moonless overcast night before splashing off the stern of the ship. Minutes before midnight, Uhlmann picked up another aerial intruder on radar and opened up with 5-inch fire. The plane countered by dropping flares as a diversionary tactic and pulled away, but Uhlmann's deadly fire found its mark as the raider burst into flame and splashed into the sea. The destroyers began laying smoke around midnight, and the raids tapered off. For the remainder of the night, Japanese planes merely approached within 6 to 7 miles (9.7 to 11.3 km), dropped flares, and retired without attacking the formation.

Japanese planes again ventured near the formation late on 14 October only to be routed by night fliers of the combat air patrol. The next day, TF 38 began a high-speed run in for strikes on Luzon, with Uhlmann providing antisubmarine protection for the fast carriers of TG 38.2. On 16 and 17 October, the carriers launched heavy strikes on Luzon concentrating on ships and installations in the Manila Bay area. Late on 17 October, the formation set a southerly course to get into position for strikes farther south, with the fighter planes of the task force dispersing light Japanese air opposition en route. Steaming east and northeast of Samar, the task force made strikes on Negros on 20 October in strategic support of the landings on Leyte and also provided direct air support for those landings.

Meanwhile, upon first sighting American minesweepers in the approaches to Leyte Gulf, Japan had sent her naval forces into Philippine waters. On 24 October, Uhlmann protected the carriers of Rear Admiral Gerald F. Bogan's TG 38.2 as they launched strikes against the Japanese Center Force which was approaching San Bernardino Strait. In an action known as the Battle of the Sibuyan Sea, American naval aircraft sank Japanese battleship Musashi and damaged several other enemy warships. At 2022 that evening, Task Force 38 turned north to seek out and destroy the Japanese Northern Force whose carriers had been spotted north of Luzon where they had been stationed in the hope of luring the 3d Fleet away from the beaches of Leyte.

However, a gallant group of American destroyers, destroyer escorts, and escort carriers had fought off the overwhelmingly superior Japanese Center Force and induced it to abandon its plan of attacking the amphibious ships which were supporting the Allied beachheads on Leyte. Thus, when TG 34.5 returned within aircraft range of San Bernardino Strait, the chastened Japanese Center Force had already retreated back through that strategic passage to safety. In the days that followed the historic Battle of Leyte Gulf, Uhlmann continued to screen TG 38.2 while its carriers conducted strikes on land targets, including raids on Luzon on 29 and 30 October. Shortly before noon on 29 October, as the carriers recovered aircraft from a strike against Japanese targets in the Manila area, Uhlmann left the formation to investigate what appeared to be the splash of a downed plane but was later determined to be a bomb splash. As the destroyer attempted to discover the cause of the splash, a Navy torpedo bomber from Hancock made a water landing nearby, and Uhlmann quickly rescued the pilot and two crewmen. Meanwhile, an enemy attack had materialized, and the destroyer went to general quarters, increased her speed to 25 knots (46 km/h; 29 mph), and executed evasive maneuvers as she attempted to rejoin the formation. As she steamed to her assigned position, she joined in the general fire against the attackers—10 to 12 Japanese planes which made notably inaccurate high altitude bombing runs and retired after one or two of their members had been splashed by the American ships' accurate fire.

On 4 November, TF 38.2 began a high-speed approach for strikes on Luzon. For two days, carrier-based aircraft pounded Luzon and Bicol. Then, on 7 November, Uhlmann set her course for Ulithi. En route, heavy seas caused flooding in the boatswain's stores and chain locker; and Uhlmann, accompanied by Yarnall, left the formation and ran with the wind while damage-control measures were being effected. She arrived at Ulithi on 9 November, underwent repairs, and got underway again on 16 November. She rendezvoused with TG 38.2 the following day and took up an antisubmarine screening station. Following carrier strikes on Luzon on 19 November, Uhlmann returned to Ulithi on 22 November.

The destroyer conducted exercises out of Ulithi until 10 December when she got underway and rendezvoused with Task Force 38 on 12 November. From 14 to 16 December, the carriers made strikes against air installations on Luzon and against shipping in water off that island to support landings on Mindoro. Toward dusk on 16 December, the task force began its retirement. As the American warships fueled northeast of Samar on 17 December, weather conditions worsened. At 1330, Uhlmann abandoned fueling from Massachusetts due to rough seas and 26-knot (48 km/h; 30 mph) winds stirred up by an approaching typhoon. On 18 December, Uhlmann recorded 69-knot (128 km/h; 79 mph) winds, and rolls up to 58 degrees as the typhoon's center passed within 30 nautical miles (56 km; 35 mi) of the formation. During the afternoon, winds decreased; and, by 2000, they had subsided to 25 knots (46 km/h; 29 mph). On 19 and 20 December, the ships of the battered task force resumed fueling which continued into the next day while its escorts searched for survivors of the three destroyers which had failed to survive the tropical storm. Late on 20 December, due to heavy seas, the carriers aborted a high-speed run in for strikes on Luzon; and Uhlmann returned to the storm area and searched for survivors. She made port at Ulithi on 24 December.

=== 1945 ===
Underway again with TG 38.1 on 30 December, she screened the carriers during strikes on Formosa and Luzon early in the new year and, an hour before midnight on 9 January 1945, transited Bashi Channel into the South China Sea. The carriers launched strikes on French Indochina, Taiwan, and Hong Kong before retiring from the South China Sea on 19 January. Steaming 75 miles (121 km) north of Luzon at dusk the next day, the formation came under attack by enemy aircraft, and Uhlmann joined other ships of the formation in repelling raiders. Following strikes on Formosa and Okinawa, TF 38 returned to Ulithi on 26 January. That day, the 3d Fleet was redesignated 5th Fleet and placed under the command of Admiral Raymond A. Spruance.

Following antisubmarine training, Uhlmann got underway from Ulithi with TG 58.2 on 10 February. During a Japanese air raid on 16 February, the first of two days of strikes on the Tokyo area, Uhlmann took under fire an enemy fighter which made a low-glide, diving attack on the ship's port beam and dropped a bomb 100 yards (91 m) in the wake of destroyer Halsey Powell. Neither destroyer suffered any damage in this exchange. On 19 February, Uhlmann screened TF 58 as it steamed north of Iwo Jima launching strikes on that island in support of the initial landings there. On 20 February, mechanical difficulties in her steering mechanism forced Uhlmann to part company with the task force, and she put in at Ulithi on 23 February for repairs. Underway on 14 March, she rendezvoused with TG 58.2 on 16 March. The next day, the carriers began a highspeed run in for strikes on Kyūshū. While the planes of TP 58 pounded that Japanese homeland, Uhlmann protected the carriers from air and submarine attack. Air activity began early on 18 March; and Uhlmann, acting as linking vessel between TF 58 and its picket line, began firing on aerial snoopers before dawn. Shortly before 0700, she joined the picket line and, at 0956, rescued three Navy aviators from a torpedo bomber which had splashed nearby.

Throughout the dav and into the night, alerts prompted by Japanese surveillance planes brought the ship's crew to general quarters. Four minutes before midnight, Uhlmann opened fire on an enemy aircraft at 10,000 yards (9,100 m). The plane burst into flame and splashed 7,000 yards (6,400 m) off the destroyer's starboard quarter and burned brightly for several minutes. Air activity continued into the early hours of 19 March. Before dawn that day, Uhlmann joined Cushing in firing on a high-altitude Japanese raider which burst into flames and splashed. Fifty miles (80 km) off the eastern shore of Shikoku on the morning of 19 March, a Japanese plane dove toward the destroyer and, despite fire from the ship, dropped a small bomb which hit 50 feet (15 m) off the ship's starboard quarter. No further action occurred that day as Uhlmann, screening TG 58.2, proceeded southward to rejoin the rest of TF 58 southeast of Kyūshū.

Ships of the task force began refueling on the 20th but were forced to discontinue when an air attack developed in mid-afternoon. Uhlmann was transferring aviation personnel to San Jacinto at 1453 when a kamikaze dove at carrier Hancock, missed, and crashed into Halsey Powell. Uhlmann fired on enemy dive bombers throughout the remainder of the afternoon, was hit by some shrapnel, but suffered no casualties. Air activity continued to be heavy as strikes on Japan continued on 21 March. During a surprise attack early in the afternoon, a bomb fell only 200 yards (180 m) from Cushing, and another bomb narrowly missed a carrier of the force. Ten minutes before midnight on 22 March, while Uhlmann steamed on picket station, she made a surface radar contact which was later identified as a Japanese submarine. In company with Haggard, she proceeded at high speed toward the submerging target and stood by while Haggard forced the enemy ship to the surface with depth charges. Haggard then rammed the submarine which exploded and sank. Uhlmann escorted the slightly damaged destroyer back to Ulithi where they arrived on 25 March.

She departed Ulithi on 30 March and set a northwesterly course. After weathering a typhoon on 2 April, she rendezvoused with TG 58.4 on 5 April and, toward dusk, began an approach for strikes on Okinawa. Following rendezvous with TF 58, she alternated radar picket and screening duties as the carrier-based planes pounded Okinawa.

In April, Japan began concentrated massed kamikaze attacks against American ships in the waters of the Ryukyus; and the carrier forces, despite their discreet distance from Okinawa, were not exempt from the attentions of the kamikazes. On 12 April, combat air patrol from the formation splashed three Mitsubishi A6M Zeroes ("Zekes") within sight of Uhlmann as she stood her picket station 25 miles (40 km) north of TF 58. Two days later, snoopers and nuisance raiders kept the air patrol occupied in the afternoon and early evening.

On radar picket with TG 58.4 on 17 April, Uhlmann joined in fire that downed two enemy aircraft, one of which splashed near Benham causing minor damage to that ship. That night, Uhlmann added her depth charges to a combined attack which sent I-56 to the bottom. Late on the afternoon of 29 April, as enemy planes began closing from the northward, destroyer Haggard joined Uhlman to strengthen the picket station in the face of attack. Minutes before 1700, a Japanese fighter plane, taken under fire by Uhlmann, nosed over and dove toward Haggard. The crash and explosion of the kamikaze and its bomb tore a hole in Haggard's starboard side, flooding her firerooms and number one engine room, and leaving her dead in the water. Meanwhile, a second "Zeke" began a run in. Uhlmann splashed the attacker close aboard Haggard and rescued two of the damaged destroyer's crew from the water. Uhlmann then requested assistance from the task group which responded with a combat air patrol of two divisions. An hour later, light cruiser USS San Diego and Destroyer Division 104 came to the aid of the stricken destroyer. Uhlmann escorted Haggard a short distance toward Kerama Retto and returned to her picket duty the next day. She screened the carrier strike force until 11 May when she headed for the Caroline Islands. The ship arrived at Ulithi on the 14th.

Underway with TG 58.4 on 24 May, the destroyer returned to a strike launch area off Okinawa and resumed her picket duties. On 28 May, operational control of the task force was returned to the 3d Fleet and TG 58.4 became TG 38.4. Uhlmann continued patrolling picket station and screening the fast carriers until 13 June when she arrived at San Pedro Bay, Leyte, for replenishment and maintenance. On 1 July, she set a northerly course; and, throughout July, the carriers conducted strikes on targets in the Japanese islands to soften up this last stronghold of Japanese power for the projected invasion. On 25 May, Uhlmann joined specially formed TG 35.3 for an antishipping sweep across Kii Suido between Honshū and Shikoku. Two hours after midnight on this completely overcast night, Uhlmann bombarded a radio tower on the southern tip of Uwano Hanto while other ships of the group shelled nearby airfields.

Until the cessation of hostilities on 15 August, Uhlmann continued to operate with the carrier force as it launched strikes against Japan. On 23 August, she rendezvoused with TF 47—a combined British-American force—for temporary escort duty in connection with the occupation of Japan. She arrived in Sagami Wan on 27 August, and immediately manned a picket station. On 30 August, while acting as plane guard for Cowpens, she rescued that carrier's landing signal officer who had jumped over the side in an attempt to rescue the pilot of a downed plane. That same day, the destroyer anchored in Sagami Wan, ending 61 days of continuous operation and, on 31 August, shifted anchorages to Tokyo Bay.

Her occupation duties included mail, freight, and passenger runs between Iwo Jima and Japanese ports. Late in October, she participated in training exercises; then, on 31 October, departed Yokosuka, steamed via Pearl Harbor, and arrived at Bremerton late in November. Following alterations, she got underway on 20 April 1946 and arrived at San Diego on 24 April. There, on 14 June 1946, she was decommissioned and placed in reserve. On 12 August, she was assigned to the Naval Reserve Training Program and underwent an overhaul at Terminal Island before reporting to the Commandant, 11th Naval District, in November 1946.

Operating out of San Diego, she trained reserve crews until the end of the decade. On 23 May 1950, she was recommissioned, but remained in reserve and, that summer, made a southward voyage, visiting Central and South American ports. She returned to San Diego in July and, on 18 November, was assigned active status.

=== Korean War ===
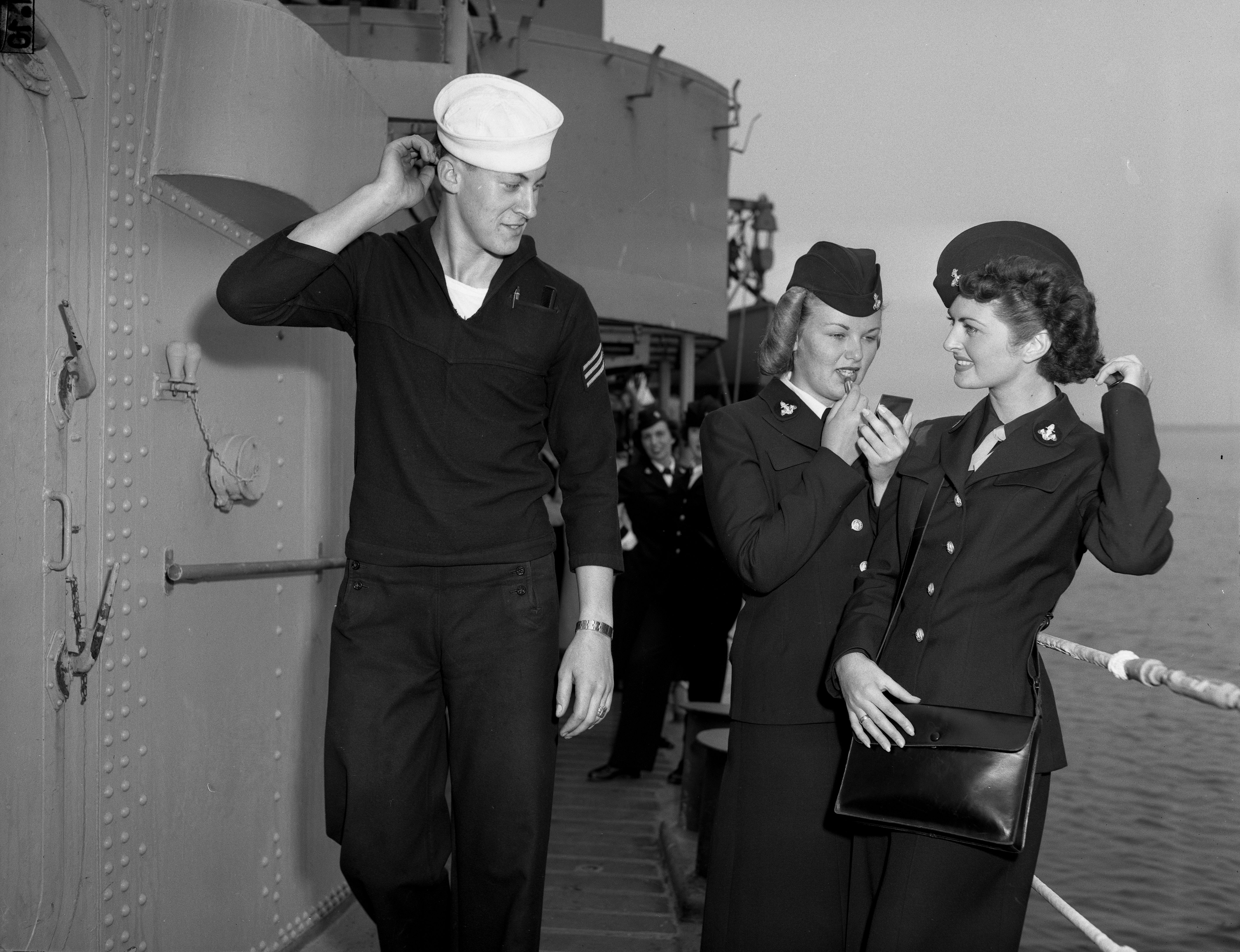
A male sailor and two WAVES on board USS Uhlmann in 1950

On 27 January 1951, she reported to the Commander in Chief, Pacific Fleet, for duty and, on 16 June, departed San Diego with units of Destroyer Division 152, setting her course for Korean waters. Commander P.A. "Tony" Lilly was in command. Assigned to TF 77—the fast carrier force operating in the Sea of Japan—Uhlmann resumed the screening and plane guard duties which had occupied much of her time in World War II. She later joined TF 95, a blockade and escort force, and carried out day and night bombardment of the Korean coast. While conducting a routine observation patrol off Wonsan Harbor's Hodo Peninsula on the morning of 20 August, the destroyer came under fire from seven enemy shore batteries. Gun flashes on the beach provided a warning only moments before shells began to fall 1,000 yards (910 m) from the destroyer. All hands went quickly to battle stations as Uhlmann commenced evasive maneuvers, increased to flank speed, and opened fire on the shore installations. In short order, she reduced the enemy on shore to two guns, while she steamed among near misses, some of which came as close as 15 yards (14 m). Fragments from the shell explosions carried away a radio antenna during the half hour engagement. Ordered by TG 95.2 to break off the action, Uhlmann withdrew out of range of the shore batteries. Commander Lilly was awarded the Bronze Star with combat "V" for "inflicting extensive damage upon the enemy" and contributing "immeasurably to the success of the siege of Wonsan". Lilly recalled another non-combat mission. "We had one espionage mission. We took three or four South Koreans up north and put them ashore near Hungnam in North Korea from our whaleboat at night. We went back some time later to pick them back up and got only one returning who was injured."

In the fall, she patrolled Taiwanese waters and participated in hunter-killer antisubmarine training off Okinawa. In November, she rejoined TF 77 and, operating in the Sea of Japan, rescued several pilots before leaving Yokosuka on 22 January 1952.

She returned to San Diego on 6 February and, in the months that followed, underwent drydocking and alterations which included the installation of new armament. She conducted exercises; then departed San Diego on 11 August 1952 in company with Destroyer Division 152, escorting Kearsarge and Toledo to the Far East.

During this seven-month Korean deployment, Uhlmann operated with fast carrier forces, conducted hunter-killer activities, and patrolled off Taiwan. She also conducted shore bombardment which destroyed enemy gun emplacements, a factory, and storage facilities, while damaging buildings, bunkers, and railways. On the morning of 3 November, as she was firing interdiction rounds on a railroad and tunnel on the east coast of North Korea near Hangwon, the destroyer was taken under fire by shore guns, mortars, and machine guns. Brought to alert by shell splashes only 100 yards (91 m) off her port bow, Uhlmann accelerated to 25 knots (46 km/h), began evasive maneuvers, and opened fire with her 3-and-5-inch (76 and 127 mm) guns. She scored a direct hit on an enemy gun emplacement and suffered only minor damages in the exchange. However, she emerged from the encounter with 13 wounded. After putting in at Hong Kong over Christmas, she departed Yokosuka on 3 March 1953, steamed via Midway and Pearl Harbor, and arrived at San Diego on 19 March 1953.

=== 1953-1958 ===
Following exercises off the west coast, Uhlmann was again deployed to the western Pacific. She proceeded via the Hawaiian Islands, and she arrived at Yokosuka on 20 November 1953. During this seven-month tour, the destroyer plied waters off Japan and Korea and engaged in training and operations out of Yokosuka and Sasebo with TF 77. In February 1954, Uhlmann joined with elements of the French and British Far Eastern Fleets for Exercise "Sonata" which included extensive antisubmarine warfare training and visits to Philippine and Indochina ports. During March, she embarked personnel of the Nationalist Chinese Navy for training.

While patrolling Taiwan Strait in the first week of March, she assisted the grounded Chinese Nationalist merchant ship Kiang Shan which was stranded on an island in the Pescadores. In the course of a daring rescue of crewmen from the Chinese steamer, Uhlmann lost her whaleboat and bent her propellers, shafts, and rudder on reefs in the shallow water. After the successful completion of her mission, she put in at Kaohsiung on 5 March. To prevent vibration damage to her reduction gears, she was towed from that port on 11 March and, on 14 March, arrived at Subic Bay for repairs. On her return to San Diego, she resumed the stateside routine of upkeep and training.

Over the next 15 years, Uhlmann made 11 more deployments to the western Pacific (WestPac). On deployment to the Far East in 1954 with Destroyer Division 152, she took part in the evacuation of the Tachen Islands—located off Hangzhou Bay—in the American attempt to defuse the explosive situation which had developed between Nationalist China and the People's Republic of China. In 1958, during a period of heightened tension over the Chinese offshore islands, the destroyer again supported American interests in the Far East. Between deployments, Uhlmann operated out of San Diego, participating in fleet exercises, receiving upkeep, and performing goodwill assignments.

=== Vietnam War ===
In the 1960s, trouble flared in the area formerly known as French Indochina; and Uhlmann served three more wartime tours in Pacific waters, this time off the coast of Vietnam. Her duties included gunfire support of land action, often coordinated by an airborne spotter, illumination missions, and routine bombardment assignments. Off Vietnam in 1965, she searched junks for contraband; supplied shore bombardment; and served as a plane guard for carrier Bon Homme Richard. In 1968, a year of heavy fighting in the Republic of Vietnam, Uhlmann acted as a plane guard in the Gulf of Tonkin and fired 50 naval gunfire support missions off Huế.

In 1969, she participated in fleet exercises in Hawaiian waters; then, on 1 October, she returned to the west coast and assumed new duties as a Group I Naval Reserve Training Ship operating out of Tacoma, Washington. For the next three years, she conducted reserve training cruises out of that port and participated in fleet exercises. During Exercise "Head Beagle" in August 1970, she conducted intensive training in the Strait of Juan de Fuca and off the coast of Washington in conjunction with Canadian naval forces.

=== Decommissioning ===
The oldest commissioned destroyer in the Navy, she was found unfit for service on 24 November 1971; and, on 15 July 1972, Uhlmann, the U.S. Navy's last Fletcher-class destroyer, was decommissioned at the Naval Reserve Center Pier, Tacoma. Her name was struck from the Navy List the same day, and she was transferred to the custody of the Inactive Ship Facility, Bremerton, for disposal. She was scrapped in 1974.

== Awards ==
- Combat Action Ribbon with two stars
- Asiatic-Pacific Campaign Medal with seven battle stars
- World War II Victory Medal
- Navy Occupation Medal with "ASIA" clasp
- National Defense Service Medal with star
- Korean Service Medal with two battle stars
- Vietnam Service Medal with five battle stars
- Philippine Presidential Unit Citation
- Korean Presidential Unit Citation
- Philippine Liberation Medal with two stars
- United Nations Korea Medal
- Korean War Service Medal
- Republic of Vietnam Campaign Medal
