= Admiral Hooper =

Admiral Hooper may refer to:

- Edwin B. Hooper (1909–1986), U.S. Navy vice admiral
- Selden G. Hooper (1904–1976), U.S. Navy rear admiral
- Stanford Caldwell Hooper (1884–1955), U.S. Navy rear admiral
