= Marinheiro =

Marinheiro is a Portuguese surname derived from the word "sailor". Notable people with the surname include:

- Elizabeth Marinheiro, Brazilian writer
- Fábio Marinheiro
- Paulo Sérgio Soares Marinheiro
- Pedro Vaz Marinheiro

== See also ==
- Brazilian ship Imperial Marinheiro
- Imperial Marinheiro (disambiguation)
- Ilha dos Marinheiros, "Island of the Sailors"
- Os Velhos Marinheiros ou o Capitao de Longo Curso, a novel
