= Brazilian ship Imperial Marinheiro =

Imperial Marinheiro is the name of the following ships of the Brazilian Navy:

- Brazilian corvette Imperial Marinheiro (1852–1865)
- Brazilian corvette Imperial Marinheiro, lead Imperial Marinheiro-class corvette, in commission 1955–2014, preserved as a museum ship
- Brazilian cruiser Imperial Marinheiro, launched in 1883, sunk in 1887

== See also ==
- Marinheiro
