= William Keith (artist) =

Scottish-American painter (1838–1911)

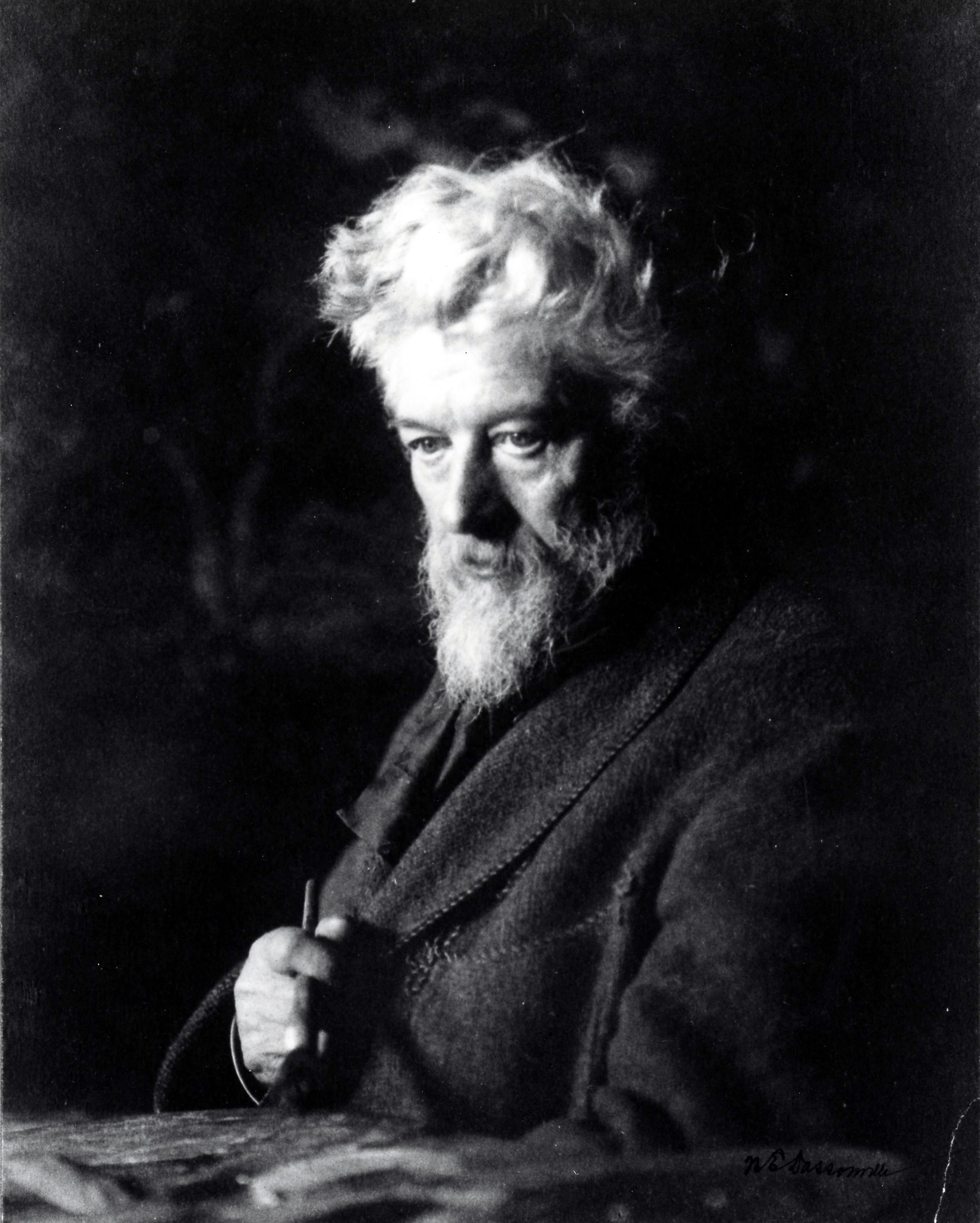
- William Keith, 1909
- Born: November 21, 1838; Oldmeldrum, Aberdeenshire, Scotland
- Died: April 13, 1911 (aged 72); Berkeley, California, U.S.
- Resting place: Mountain View Cemetery, plot 14b
- Occupation: Painter
- Spouses: Elizabeth Emerson (1864–1882); Mary McHenry (1883–1947)
- Children: Charles Van Vleck Keith (1865–); Mary Hortense Keith (1869–1948)
- Parents: William Keith (1806–1838); Elizabeth Bruce (1813–1868)

William Keith (November 21, 1838 – April 13, 1911) was a Scottish-American painter famous for his California landscapes. He is associated with Tonalism and the American Barbizon school. Although most of his career was spent in California, he started out in New York, made two extended study trips to Europe, and had a studio in Boston in 1871–72 and one in New York in 1880.

== Early life ==
Keith was born in Oldmeldrum, Aberdeenshire, Scotland, where he was raised at first by his grandparents, his father having died months before he was born. William claimed to have been a direct descendant of the noble Clan Keith. He emigrated with his mother and sisters to the United States in 1850. They settled in New York City, where he attended school for several years and became an apprentice wood engraver in 1856. He was hired to do illustrations for Harper's Magazine. In 1858 he visited Scotland and England and briefly worked for the London Daily News. He was then offered an opportunity in San Francisco and sailed there in May 1859.

My subjective pictures are the ones that come from the inside. I feel some emotion and I immediately paint a picture that expresses it. The sentiment is the only thing of real value in my pictures, and only a few people understand that. Suppose I want to paint something recalling meditation or repose. If people do not feel that sensation when my work is completed, they do not appreciate nor realize the picture. The fact that they like it means nothing. Any one who can use paint and brushes can paint a true scene of nature — that is an objective picture. The artist must not depend on extraneous things. There is no reality in his art if he must depend on outside influences — it must come from within.

— William Keith, from 1913 Exhibition booklet, Art Institute of Chicago

== California and Europe ==
Upon Keith's arrival in San Francisco the job he had hoped for did not materialize, so he set up his own engraving business. He formed a partnership with Harrison Eastman in 1862 and with Durbin Van Vleck in 1864. He first studied painting with Samuel Marsden Brookes in 1863, and may have taken watercolor instruction from Elizabeth Emerson, whom he married in 1864. He first exhibited his watercolors in 1866, and they were praised by critics. His subject matter already included views of Yosemite and other High Sierra locations. By 1868 he had begun painting in oils. That year Keith was able to end his engraving career and pursue painting full-time when he received a commission from the Oregon Navigation and Railroad Company to paint scenes of the Pacific Northwest.

The Keiths went to Düsseldorf, Germany, in 1869–1871, following in the footsteps of American artists such as Albert Bierstadt and Worthington Whittredge. While there, Keith studied under Albert Flamm, but also wrote enthusiastically in letters about the free, "suggestive" brushwork of Andreas Achenbach. He also spent time in Paris, where he admired both the old masters and the Barbizon school painters. Upon his return to the United States, he shared a studio in Boston with William Hahn from 1871 to 1872.

== Friendship with John Muir ==
Keith then returned to California, and traveled to Yosemite Valley with a letter of introduction to John Muir. The two men became deep friends for the next 38 years. Both had been born in Scotland the same year, and they shared a love for the mountains of California. James Mitchell Clarke described their friendship as one "in which deep affection and admiration were expressed through a kind of verbal boxing, counter-jibe answering jibe, counter-insult responding to insult."

== "Epic" paintings of the High Sierra, 1870s ==
During the 1870s Keith painted a number of six- by ten-foot panoramas, including Kings River Canyon (Oakland Museum, originally owned by Governor Leland Stanford) and "California Alps" (Mission Inn, Riverside). These competed with paintings of similar size and subject matter by Albert Bierstadt and Thomas Hill.

== The 1880s ==
Keith's wife Elizabeth died in 1882. He turned for comfort to a friend, the Swedenborgian minister Joseph Worcester, who ultimately had a strong influence on Keith's approach to landscape painting.

In 1883 Keith married Mary McHenry, who was the first female graduate of Hastings Law School and a leading suffragist. For their honeymoon, they went on a painting tour of the old California missions. A few months later they traveled to the East Coast and then to Munich, where Keith was determined to learn figure and portrait painting. He primarily worked on his own, occasionally receiving criticism from artists including Carl von Marr and J. Frank Currier. They returned to San Francisco in mid 1885.

Through Joseph Worcester, Keith met the architect Daniel Burnham in Chicago while en route to Europe. Burnham became an important patron and agent, showing and selling Keith paintings to collectors in the Chicago area.

In 1886 the Keiths moved into a custom-built house in Berkeley, from where he would commute to his studio in San Francisco each day. That year Keith also cruised Alaska's Inland Passage and sketched some of its glaciers.

Keith painted some portraits on commission and also supplemented his income by giving painting lessons, mostly to women. Among his pupils was the miniaturist Rosa Hooper and Leola Hall who painted Keith's portrait.

In 1888 Keith traveled north with Muir, visiting Mount Shasta and Mount Rainier to create illustrations for Muir's Picturesque California. Muir encouraged Keith to depict mountain scenery realistically, but as Keith's artistic sense had matured, he felt free to depart from geologic reality, placing an imagined glacier or a river in a scene to enhance the beauty of the painting. The two friends argued frequently about such artistic issues. It was said that Muir said, "You never saw a sunrise like that, Keith. Why in the deuce don't you imitate nature?' William would goad Muir by responding, 'Look here now, John, if you'll go out early tomorrow morning and look toward the East you'll see nature imitating my sunrise.".

Keith was part of a group of friends of John Muir who met in San Francisco starting in 1889 to support the establishment of Yosemite National Park. This group went on to encourage Muir to establish an association to protect the Sierra Nevada. In 1892, this plan was realized when the Sierra Club was founded.

== Later years ==
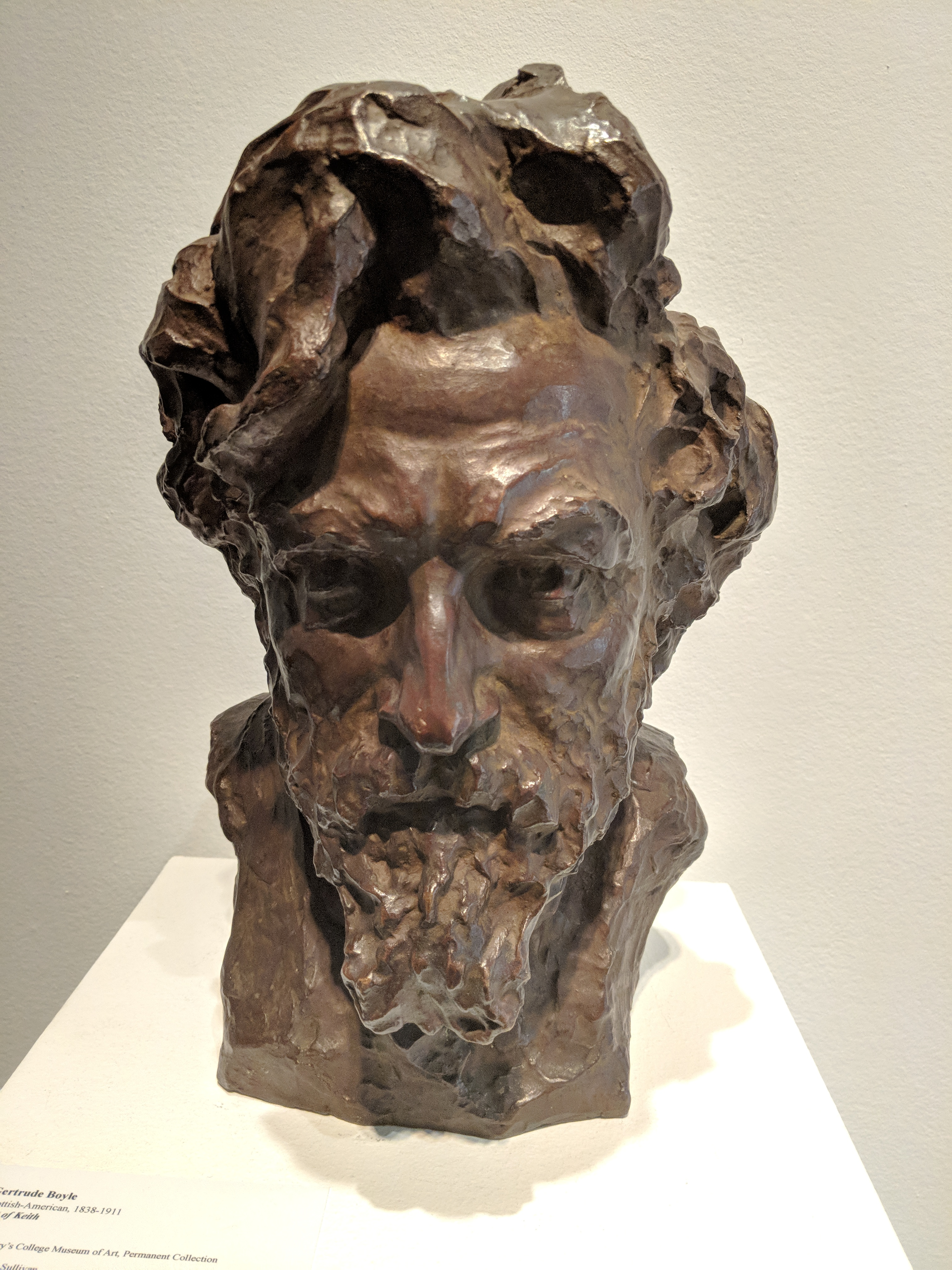
Bust of Keith in 1904 by Gertrude Boyle

From the late 1880s on, Keith painted primarily in a subjective vein in which his emotional and spiritual reactions to the landscape were more important than topographical facts. He painted many woodland views that resembled those of Théodore Rousseau and other Barbizon painters, as well as the American painter George Inness. Inness came to visit the San Francisco Bay Area in 1891. He and Keith painted together, and Keith felt he was learning a lot and regaining an enthusiasm for painting that he had begun to lose. Inness's fame and enthusiasm for Keith's work gave a substantial boost to sales of Keith's paintings.

In the 1890s and early 1900s Keith painted landscapes of Carmel Bay and Cypress Point from his trips to the Monterey Peninsula. He painted the California missions, including Mission San Carlos Borromeo de Carmelo. He was one of the earliest artists to buy land in Carmel-by-the-Sea, California.

=== Great San Francisco Earthquake of 1906 ===
Keith's San Francisco studio was destroyed in the fires that followed the 1906 San Francisco earthquake. This resulted in the loss of many paintings. Some accounts place the number at several thousand. The psychologist William James, then a professor at Stanford University, reported that in the immediate aftermath of the quake a pair of Keith vigilantes had circulated in San Francisco, breaking into homes to save the Keith paintings within. According to James,

[T]hese two citizens, lovers of his work, early in the day diverted their attention from all other interests, their own private ones included, and made it their duty to visit every place which they knew to contain a Keith painting. They cut them from their frames, rolled them up, and in this way got all the more important ones into a place of safety.

These benefactors presented the recovered paintings to Keith, who was then working from his primary studio at his Berkeley home. Keith was reportedly so touched at the gesture and "having given up his previous work for lost, [Keith] resolved to lose no time in making what amends he could for the disaster." This experience led to Keith's promise, despite his declining health, to replace for his buyers all paintings lost during the fires.

=== Last years and death ===
He remained a revered but reclusive figure in the large Berkeley art colony and refused to participate in the founding of the Berkeley Art Association in 1907. He consistently contributed paintings to the colony's exhibitions between 1906 and 1911. In the summer of 1906 he briefly appeared in public to support Harry W. Seawell, a drawing instructor at the University of California, in what became an embarrassing scandal. When the university forbade Seawell from using nude models in his life classes, Keith published a blunt declaration of support in the local press, proclaiming that the nude model is "essential to real art."

Keith did not entirely abandon realistic depictions of mountain scenery. In October 1907, accompanied by Muir, Keith visited and painted the Hetch Hetchy Valley in Yosemite National Park, soon to be dammed to create a reservoir to provide water and power for San Francisco. Linnie Marsh Wolfe wrote that Keith "left behind all his synthetics of the last twenty-five years and humbly, reverently portrayed what he saw, as objectively as in the seventies when Muir first infused into him his own spirit and vision." Keith expressed great annoyance with the many high-quality forgeries of his work on the San Francisco market.

What I want to do is to study nature. The best way to do that is to be near her, and I have vague ideas about living in such close communion with her that she may adopt me and show me things hidden to every eye but that which loves her sincerely.

— William Keith, A Selection of American Paintings at Mission San Francisco Solano de Sonoma. California: The Sonoma Index-Tribune, 1976.

What a landscape painter wants to render is not the natural landscape, but the state of feeling which the landscape produces in himself.

— Cornelius, Brother. Keith, Old Master of California. New York: Putnam, 1942

There is the suggestion... we cannot see the cow, her hoofs. her horns, and her tail, but she is there.I can see her...every detail is worked out. I will sell that without any trouble.The buyer will look at it; see just exactly what it is and his intelligence is flattered. He has understood. He is wise. He is critic. He is a buyer. How few people really know what a sketch means to a painter who produces it.

— Cornelius, Brother. Keith, Old Master of California. New York: Putnam, 1942

Keith died in his home at 2207 Atherton Street in Berkeley, California, in 1911. He is buried in plot 14b at Mountain View Cemetery in Oakland.

== Legacy ==
- Saint Mary's College of California in Moraga owns more than 180 paintings by William Keith. The collection was started by Brother Fidelis Cornelius, a Christian Brother who taught art at the college and who wrote a 900-page, 2-volume biography, William Keith, Old Master of California. Two thematic exhibitions of his work are held each year in the Keith Room of the Saint Mary's College Museum of Art (formerly the Hearst Art Gallery).
- Keith Avenue in Berkeley was named after William Keith.
- Mount Keith was named after William Keith by Helen Gompertz (later Helen LeConte) in July 1896.
- San Francisco Mayor Edward Robeson Taylor published an 1898 book of sonnets based on Keith's paintings.

== Gallery ==
Selected Artwork by William Keith
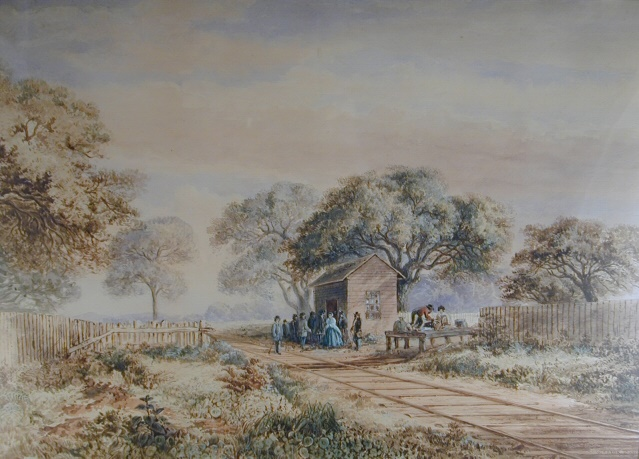
Early Oakland, 7th and Adeline Streets, The Southern Pacific Depot, 1867

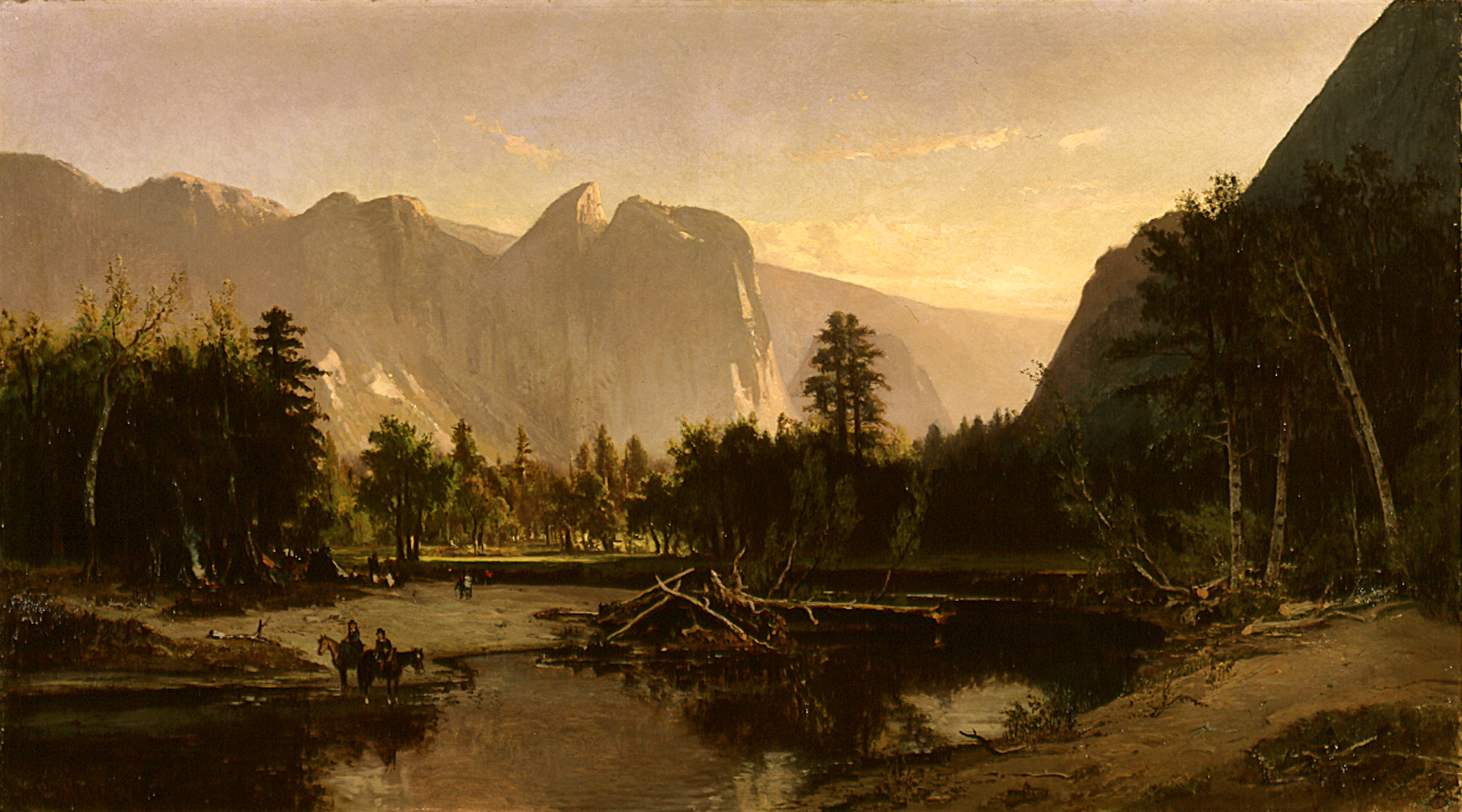
Yosemite Valley, 1875

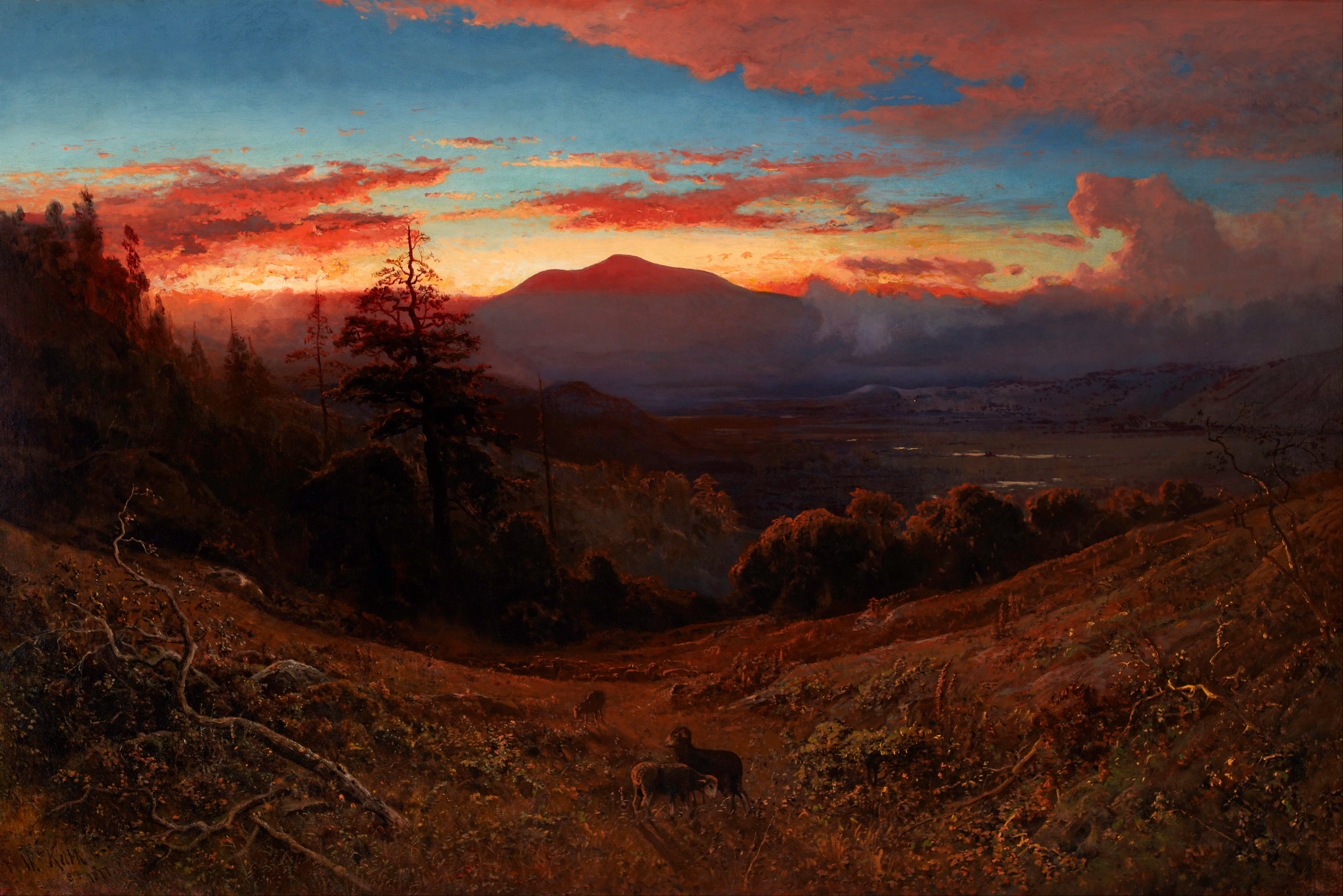
Sunset on Mount Diablo, 1877

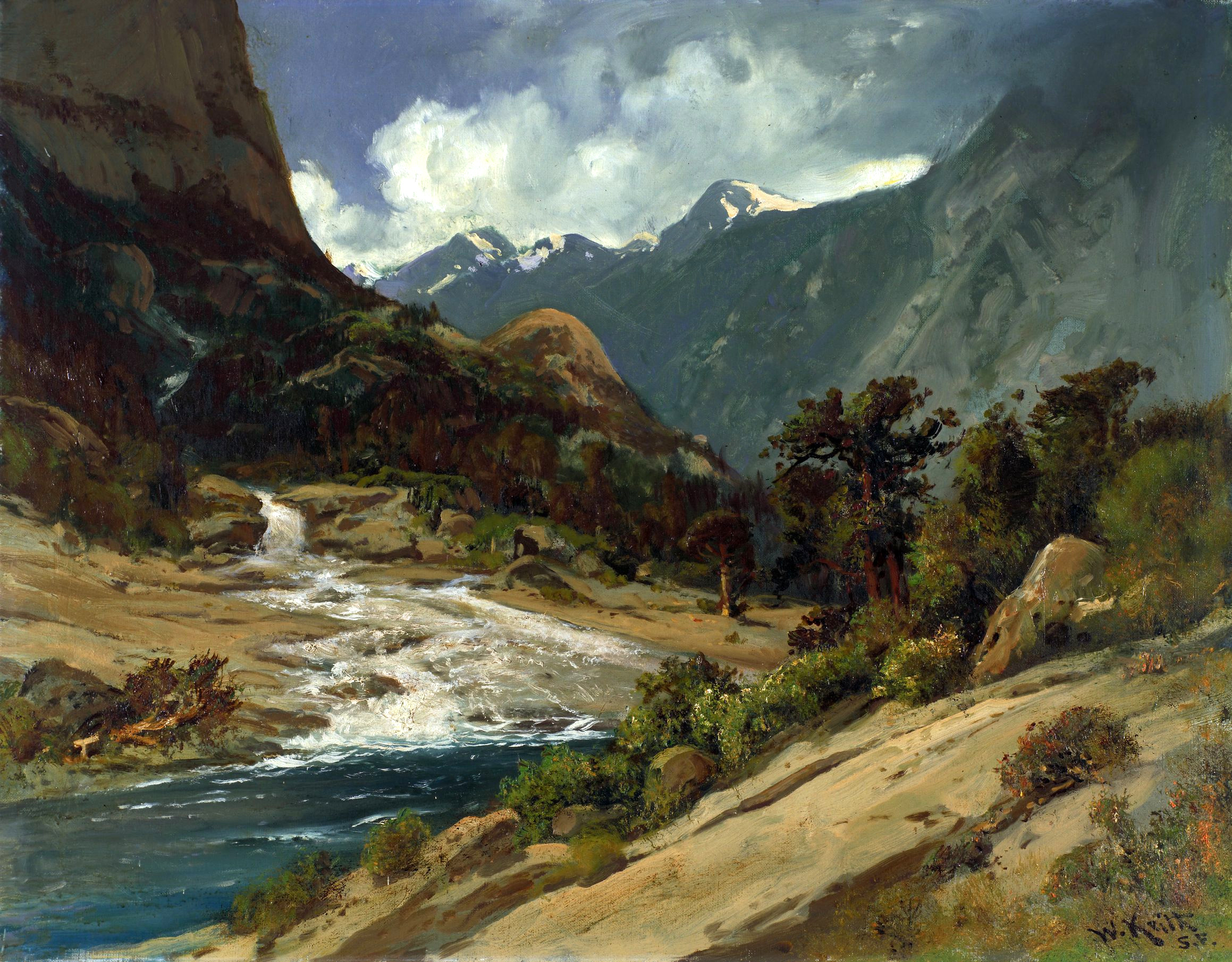
Hetch Hetchy Side Canyon, I, c. 1908

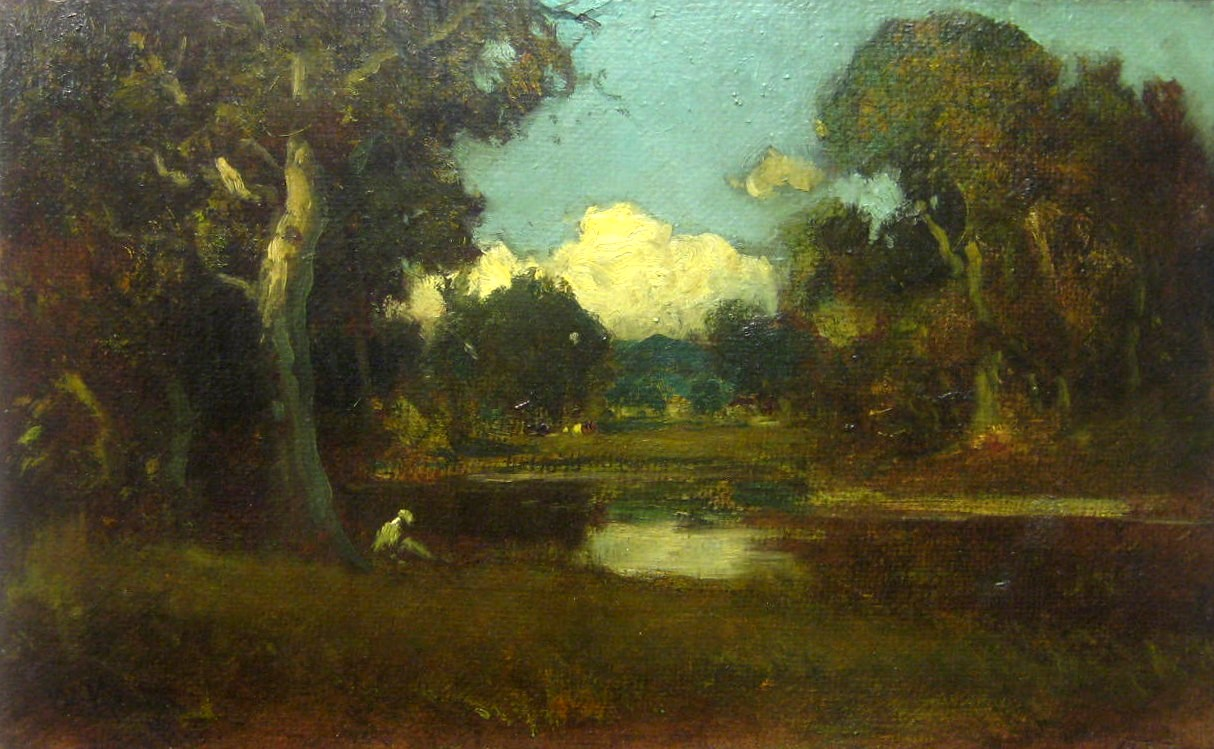
Berkeley Oaks

== Bibliography ==
=== Essays online ===
- "An Artist's Trip in the Sierra. Yosemite Valley, July 5th, 1875"
- "An Artist's Trip in the Sierra. Second Letter"
- George Wharton James, "William Keith," The Craftsman, vol. 7 (1904), pp. 299ff.
