= Rosa Hooper =

American painter (1876–1963)

- Born: 1876; San Francisco, California, U.S.
- Died: 1963 (aged 86–87); San Francisco, California, U.S.
- Education: San Francisco Art League
- Occupation: Painter of miniatures

Rose Hooper (1876–1963) was an American painter of miniatures. Born in San Francisco, California, she was the daughter of Col. William B. Hooper, proprietor of the Occidental Hotel in San Francisco, and his wife, Eleanor. The family was part of high society in San Francisco, and Rose Hooper was a debutante in the 1895–1896 season. Hooper married Charles Albert Plotner on October 25, 1903, in Philadelphia, PA. The couple had a son, Selden Hooper Plotner, but divorced in 1910. Hooper's second husband was William C. Lyons.

She studied at the San Francisco Art League under William Keith and Emil Carlsen. Further instruction in New York followed, under Amalia Küssner Coudert. She studied in Dresden, Germany, with Otto Eckhardt and in Paris, France, with Gabrielle Debillemont-Chardon. In 1903, Hooper returned to her native city, and in 1926 she moved to New York, remaining there until 1939. She later returned to California, living in Coronado from 1946 until 1958 and thereafter in San Francisco until her death.

Hooper received awards at the Alaska–Yukon–Pacific Exposition of 1909, the Panama–Pacific Exposition of 1915, and the 1929 exhibition of the California Society of Miniature Painters, of which organization she was a founding member. A portrait of a lady attributed to her is in the collection of the Metropolitan Museum of Art.
