= Amalia Küssner Coudert =

American painter

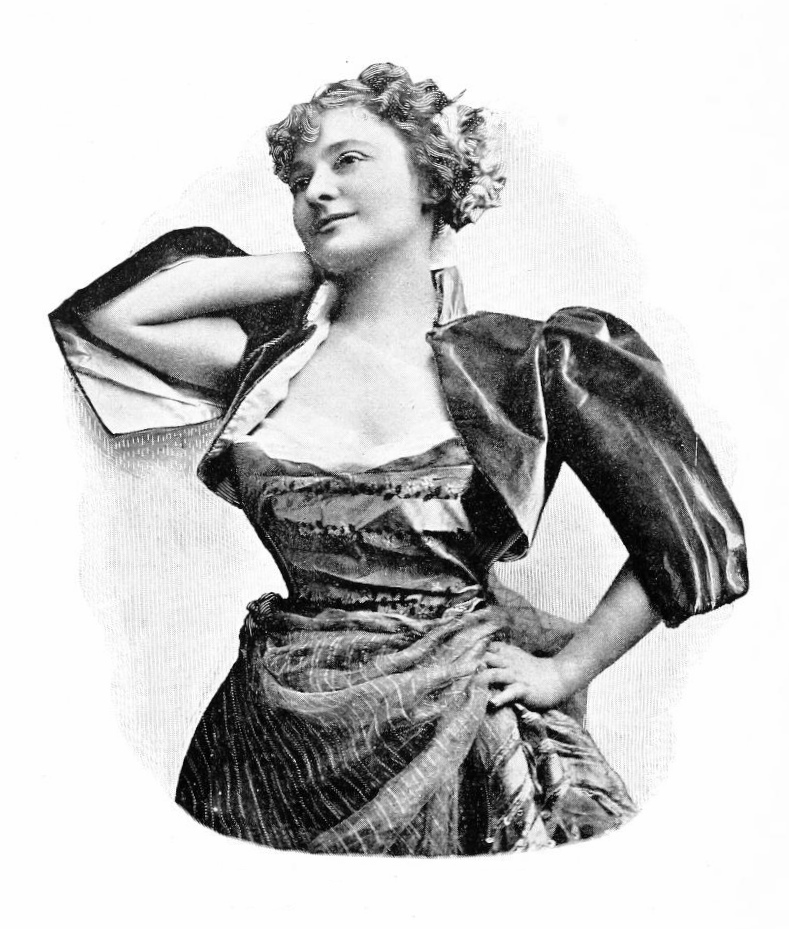
- Born: Amalia Küssner; March 26, 1863; Crawfordsville, Indiana
- Died: May 1932; Montreux, Switzerland
- Education: Saint Mary-of-the-Woods Academy
- Known for: Portrait miniature painting
- Patrons: Minnie Paget

Amalia Küssner Coudert (March 26, 1863 – May 1932) was an American known for her portrait miniatures of prominent American and European figures of the late 19th and early 20th century. From Terre Haute, Indiana, subjects of her paintings include actresses Lillian Russell and Marie Tempest; wealthy socialites Caroline Schermerhorn Astor, Emily Havemeyer (the wife of Theodore Havemeyer); members of Britain's royal family and London society such as King Edward VII, Alice Keppel, and Consuelo Vanderbilt, the Duchess of Marlborough; as well as members of the Russian royal family, including Czar Nicholas II and his wife, Czarina Alexandra Feodorovna; and wealthy industrialists such as Cecil Rhodes.

== Early life and education ==
Amalia "Amalie" Küssner was born on March 26, 1863, in Crawfordsville, Indiana, to German immigrants, Lorenz and Emilie (Weinhardt) Küssner. The family, including Amalia's older siblings, Albert and Louisa, lived briefly in Greencastle, Indiana, before moving to Terre Haute, Indiana, on February 24, 1864. At Terre Haute, Lorenze Küssner ran the Palace of Music, a musical instrument repair shop at 213 Ohio Street. In 1867, after a fire destroyed the building, the Küssner music business moved to 219 Ohio Street, where the family lived in an apartment above the shop. Lorenz Küssner gave his daughter her first a miniature portrait on ivory when she was twelve years old. She enjoyed sketching the local scenery and began painting her own miniature portraits of family and friends on pieces of ivory, often from the discarded piano keys of damaged pianos.

Küssner attended local elementary schools in Terre Haute and studied art in 1872–74 with Sister Maurice Schnell at Saint Mary's Academy, which later became Saint Mary-of-the-Woods College. Küssner graduated from Terre Haute High School in June 1881. From 1883 to 1885, she continued her education at the boarding school of Madame Da Saliva and Mrs. Bradford in New York. After returning to Terre Haute, Küssner studied under local tutor Helen Minshall, became a charter member of the city's Decorative Arts Society, established an art studio, and began her career as a painter of portrait miniatures.

== Career ==
Matilda Thora Wainwright Scott Strong, c. 1894, is representative of Coudert's watercolor miniatures on ivory.

During the early years of her career in Terre Haute, Indiana, Küssner painted miniature portraits of the likenesses of wealthy local residents that included members of the Fairbanks, Minshall, Baker, and Reynolds families. After moving to New York City in 1891, she became famous for her miniature portrait work. Her typical miniature portraits were painted on small, oval discs of ivory from one to three inches in diameter. She reportedly completed more than 200 miniature portraits of notable individuals during her career. In many instances, the artist portrayed her subjects in a favorable light, choosing to emphasize their best features instead of reproducing exact likenesses.

=== New York City and Chicago ===
By 1892 Küssner had settled in New York City to pursue a career painting miniature portraits. Armed with introductions from her school friend and state actress Alice Fischer, as well as examples of her work, Küssner began to receive commissions to paint portraits of Manhattan's elite. She maintained a studio at her apartments in the Windsor Hotel and was paid an estimated US$1,000 per portrait.

Küssner's early clients included Emily Havemeyer, the wife of Theodore Havemeyer; actresses Lillian Russell and Marie Tempest; and Caroline Schermerhorn Astor, the wife of William B. Astor (grandson of John Jacob Astor). While visiting her brother's family in Chicago, Illinois, in 1894, Küssner was commissioned to paint miniature portraits of the Armour family, founders of the successful meatpacking firm, Armour and Company. In addition to painting, Küssner taught art. Among her pupils was the miniaturist Rosa Hooper.

By the mid-1890s, coverage of Küssner in New York and Chicago newspapers and magazines introduced some inaccuracies in the details of her life. In the February 2, 1895, issue of Harper's Bazaar, for example, a writer profiled her luxuriously decorated studio and described her as a 22-year-old child prodigy, even though she was 31 at the time. Küssner did nothing to correct the error. Throughout her life, she claimed to be a full decade younger than her actual age. Küssner also encouraged those who described her as "girl artist" and took advantage of the publicity to promote herself and her work.

=== Paintings of royalty ===
Küssner traveled to Europe in March 1896 under the patronage of socialite Minnie Paget. Through Paget's social connections, Küssner received commissions to paint miniature portraits of British royalty and London society that included Consuelo Vanderbilt, the Duchess of Marlborough. Küssner became well known for her miniature paintings of European royalty after returning to London in 1897 to paint miniature portraits of the Prince of Wales, who later became King Edward VII. In 1899, Küssner traveled to St. Petersburg, Russia, to paint miniature portraits of several members of the Russian royal family, including Czar Nicholas II and his wife, Czarina Alexandra Feodorovna at the Winter Palace. Küssner also painted miniature portraits of Grand Duchess Maria Pavlovna, an aunt of Czar Nicholas II, and Grand Duchess Elena Vladimirovna, the daughter of Grand Duke Vladimir Alexandrovich of Russia. At the height of her career in the late 1890s, Küssner earned her as much as US$4,000 per portrait.

== Later years ==
In 1899 Küssner traveled to southern Africa to obtain permission from Cecil Rhodes, a British diamond mining magnate, to paint his miniature portrait. She began the work at his summer home in Africa and completed the portrait after returning to New York City. Following her marriage in July 1900, she accepted only a few commissions for her portrait work, but did not give it up entirely. A New York Times article in 1901 claimed that Amalia Küssner Coudert was "meeting with great success" in London, but, for the most part, her career dwindled and eventually ended after her marriage.

Küssner duPont Coudert's most notable work after 1900 included a return trip to Russia in 1902 to paint a second miniature portrait of Czarina Alexandra Feodorovna. After returning to England, she painted a miniature portrait in 1903 of Alice Keppel, the mistress of the King Edward VII. In 1904, Küssner Coudert was involved in a lawsuit in London with Ada Watney regarding payment for a miniature portrait.

Although Amalia and Charles duPont Coudert maintained a mansion in New York, which was a wedding gift from his mother, the couple spent most of their married life traveling throughout Europe. The couple also owned at least one piece of notable art. In 1911, the duPont Couderts loaned a Pierre Puvis de Chavannes painting titled "Child Gathering Apples" to the Metropolitan Museum of Art. The duPont Couderts sold the family home in New York in 1914 and purchased Windlesham Hall, a Tudor castle in Surrey, England.

== Personal life ==
Küssner met Charles duPont Coudert, a wealthy international lawyer, during a trip to Paris, France, in March 1896. Their courtship was interrupted in 1898 due to his military service in the Philippines during the Spanish–American War, but it resumed after his return to the United States in autumn of 1899. On July 4, 1900, Küssner married Captain duPont Coudert in a private ceremony attended only by their mothers in the sacristy at St. Patrick's Cathedral in New York City. A small dinner party at the Hotel Savoy followed the ceremony and the newlyweds sailed for England the next day. The New York Times society page reported that the surprisingly "hasty wedding ... made quite a little stir", although the couple had known each other for more than four years at the time of their wedding and had been frequent companions at public events and social gatherings in New York. Coudert was born in 1875, which would make him eleven or twelve years younger than Küssner.

== Death and legacy ==
Amalia Küssner duPont Coudert died of a "lung ailment" at Montreux, Switzerland, in May 1932. Examples of her miniature portraits are in the collections of the Swope Art Museum in Terre Haute, Indiana, and the Cincinnati Art Museum in Cincinnati, Ohio.

In addition to her paintings, Küssner Coudert is remembered for a 1906 article she wrote for Century Magazine about her experience painting Czar Nicholas II and Czarina Alexandra of Russia in March 1899. In "The Human Side of the Tsar," the artist describes in significant detail the royal lodgings, her interactions with the royal family and staff, and the process of painting their portraits, providing a rare glimpse into the personal lives of the family. She also relayed that the royal family referred to each other as "Emperor" and "Empress" and spoke English in the home.
