= Brazilian corvette Caboclo =

Corvette used in the Brazilian and Namibian navies

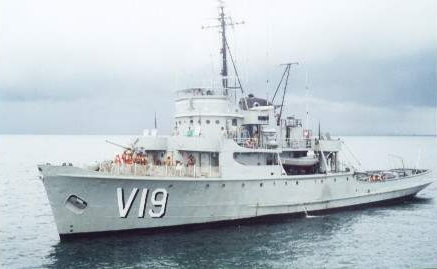
- Cv Caboclo (V19)

History

Brazil
- Name: Caboclo
- Namesake: Caboclo
- Operator: Brazilian Navy
- Builder: Bodewes Scheepswerf
- Launched: 26 August 1954
- Christened: 8 October 1953
- Commissioned: 16 July 1955
- Identification: MMSI number: 710470000; Callsign: PWCE
- Nickname(s): Chico Bento (Chuck Billy)
- Status: in active service

General characteristics
- Class & type: Imperial Marinheiro-class corvette
- Displacement: 911 tons standard, 1,025 tons full load
- Length: 55.72 m (182.8 ft)
- Beam: 9.55 m (31.3 ft)
- Draught: 3.6 m (12 ft)
- Ice class: 1A
- Propulsion: 2 Sulzer 6TD36 1,080 hp
- Speed: 18 knots (33 km/h; 21 mph)
- Range: 19,000 nmi (35,000 km; 22,000 mi)
- Crew: 64
- Sensors & processing systems: Navigation Radar
- Armament: 1 3"/50 caliber gun; 4 Oerlikon 20 mm cannon

Cv Caboclo (V19) is an Imperial Marinheiro-class corvette of the Brazilian Navy. Caboclo was the fifth of the Imperial Marinheiro-class corvettes ordered by the Brazilian Navy in 1953. Caboclo was launched on 19 August 1954, and commissioned on 16 July 1955.

== History ==
The corvette Caboclo (V19) is the fourth ship to bear this name in the Brazilian Navy.

In June 2009, Caboclo participated in the recovery mission of the wreckage of Air France Flight 447.
