= Selden G. Hooper =

Selden G. Hooper (25 December 1904 – 7 February 1976) was the only admiral of the United States Navy to be convicted by court-martial, for homosexual acts carried out post-service.

Hooper was the commissioning commanding officer of the Fletcher-class destroyer USS Uhlmann on 22 November 1943.

In U.S. V. Hooper, 26 CMR 417 (CMA, 1958), Hooper was tried by general court-martial for sodomy, conduct of a nature to bring discredit upon the Armed Forces, and conduct unbecoming an officer and a gentleman. Hooper had retired as a rear admiral in 1950, and the acts for which he was tried were committed after he had retired. The defense questioned the military court's jurisdiction, but the court explained that "retired personnel are a part of the land or naval forces." The military retiree, then, is not simply a civilian. The court held that the admiral was "a part of the military forces of this country." He was described as "an officer of the Navy of the United States, entitled to wear the uniform and to draw pay as such." He was convicted and sentenced to dismissal and forfeiture of all pay and allowances.

Hooper was the only flag officer of the U.S. Navy to be convicted by court-martial, and strictly speaking, the only Navy flag officer to ever be tried by court-martial. In 1995, Everett L. Greene was acquitted of sexual harassment and other related charges; he had been selected for promotion to rear admiral, but was still a captain when he was tried.

== Personal life and career ==
Son to Rosa Hooper, Hooper's career in the military started when he left San Francisco, the town he'd been raised, to join the National Guard. After graduating from the US Naval Academy of Annapolis, Hooper joined the US Navy as the rank of Ensign. After quickly making lieutenant, he married a daughter of a wealthy paper manufacturer, Kathryn Rising. Just four years later, the United States would enter as a belligerent to World War 2, Hooper was made the commander of the Fletcher class destroyer, the USS Uhlmann. During service, Hooper was credited with having adverted a crippling attack on American Amphibious Ships.

== Court martial ==
After a series of intelligence missions carried out over 4 weeks in the winter of 1957, four officers of the Office of Naval Intelligence, in which they utilized surveillance gear in an adjacent house they rented out, Hooper was found to be engaging in several homosexual acts. On the first night of surveillance, the officers found a young sailor, Roscoe Braddock, dancing with the retired Navy admiral before witnessing the two kiss. After several subsequent return trips to surveil Hooper's residence, the officers discovered another enlisted sailor, John Schmidt, and witnessed the three together, before Hooper and Schmidt undressed and then proceeded to turn the lights out; leaving the officers with strong evidence of homosexual conduct.

In April, the following year, retired Admiral Hooper was officially notified that the commandant of the Eleventh Naval District, Rear Admiral Charles Hartman, has filed charges against him related to the Uniform Code of Military Justice:

- Article 125 - sodomy;
- Article 134 - conduct of a nature to bring discredit on the armed forces;
- Article 135 - conduct unbecoming to an officer and a gentleman.

During the court proceedings, the prosecution (The Navy) enlisted a slew of character witnesses. A significant number were other sailors, including Roscoe Braddock, who, under oath, was forced to admit to sharing a bed with Hooper, thereby corroborating claims of homosexual conduct. The defense for Hooper called upon their own character witnesses, that all testified that Hooper was an upstanding citizen, with a distinguished military record. They also called upon a psychiatrist from San Diego County Hospital, who testified that Hooper was not a homosexual. Despite this, the panel returned a unanimous verdict against Hooper.
