= Brazilian corvette Ipiranga =

Shipwrecked Brazilian military vessel

Ipiranga
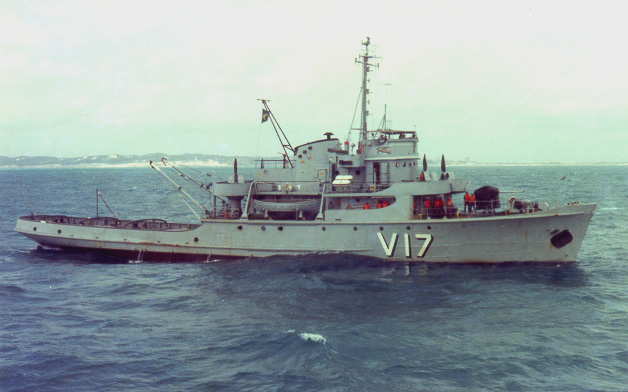

History

Brazil
- Name: Ipiranga
- Namesake: Ipiranga River
- Builder: Smit, Netherlands
- Laid down: 17 October 1953
- Launched: 26 June 1954
- Commissioned: 6 January 1955
- Stricken: October 1983
- Identification: Hull number: V17
- Fate: Sank in 1983

General characteristics
- Class & type: Imperial Marinheiro-class corvette
- Displacement: 911 t (897 long tons) standard; 962 t (947 long tons) full load
- Length: 55.72 m (182 ft 10 in)
- Beam: 9.55 m (31 ft 4 in)
- Draft: 3.60 m (11 ft 10 in)
- Propulsion: 2 shafts; 2 diesel engines, 1,610 kW (2,160 bhp)
- Speed: 16 knots (30 km/h; 18 mph)
- Range: 15,000 nmi (28,000 km; 17,000 mi) at 14 knots (26 km/h; 16 mph)
- Complement: 64
- Armament: 1 × 76.2 mm (3 in) dual-purpose gun; 4 × single 20 mm (0.79 in) anti-aircraft guns

Ipiranga (V17) was a corvette of the Imperial Marinheiro class constructed for the Brazilian Navy (Marinha do Brasil). The ship was laid down in 1953 and launched in 1954. The vessel entered service in 1955 and was primarily used for enforcement of Brazil's territorial waters and district patrols. Based on a sea-going tugboat design, the corvette was also capable of performing coast guard duties such as towing and was equipped for firefighting. Ipiranga could also be converted for minesweeping and minelaying duties. In 1961, Ipiranga was deployed to prohibit French encroachment on Brazilian fisheries. In 1983, the corvette struck an underwater pinnacle and sank off the northeast coast of Brazil.

== Background ==
Imperial Marinheiro-class corvettes were built and designed following the order of Brazilian Navy Minister Admiral Renato de Almeida Guillobel in the early 1950s. Designated corvettes by the Brazilian Navy, they were based on a sea-going tugboat design and could be converted for minesweeping or minelaying. They could also be used for coast guard duties such as towing and were equipped for firefighting. The ship measured 55.72 meters (182 ft 10 in) long with a beam of 9.55 m (31 ft 4 in) and a draft of 3.60 m (11 ft 10 in). The corvette had a standard displacement of 911 metric tons (897 long tons) and 962 t (947 long tons) at full load. The ship had a complement of 64 officers and enlisted personnel.

Ipiranga was powered by two Sulzer 6TD36 6-cylinder diesel engines turning two shafts creating 1,610 kilowatts (2,160 bhp), giving the ship a maximum speed of 16 knots (30 km/h; 18 mph). The corvette carried 135 t (133 long tons; 149 short tons) of diesel fuel and had a range of 15,000 nautical miles (28,000 km; 17,000 mi) at 14 knots (26 km/h; 16 mph). The vessel mounted two 160 kW diesel generators and one 75 kW backup diesel generator with alternators. They had a bollard pull of 18 tons and a 500 m (1,600 ft) tow cable installed on the main deck along with firefighting equipment. The corvette was armed with one 76.2-millimeter (3 in) dual-purpose gun and four 20 mm (0.79 in) anti-aircraft guns.

== Construction and career ==
Ipiranga was ordered from Smit in the Netherlands, and the ship's keel was laid down on 17 October 1953 at the CC Sheepsbower & Gashonder Bedriff Jonker & Stans shipyard in Rotterdam and was launched on 26 June 1954. Captain Ediguche Gomes Carneiro took sea command of Ipiranga upon her commissioning on 6 January 1955. She was the fourth Brazilian vessel to be named in reverence to the historically and culturally significant Ipiranga River of Sãn Paulo, the site of Dom Pedro's then Brazilian Independence proclamation in 1822. Ipiranga primarily used for district patrols and enforcement of Brazil's 200-nautical-mile (370 km; 230 mi) limit of its exclusive economic zone. She was one of two corvettes deployed to sea by Admiral Arnolodo Toscano in response to French fisherman encroaching in the locals' fishing and lobster territory in 1961.

=== Fate ===
Ipiranga sank in October 1983. During a routine mission, the bow of the corvette struck the protruding rocks of the Cabeça da Sapata underwater pinnacle and sank in 60 meters (200 ft) of water off the northeast coast of Brazil, not far from the Fernando de Noronha archipelago. The vessel was stricken from the navy list in 1983.
