= Imperial Marinheiro-class corvette =

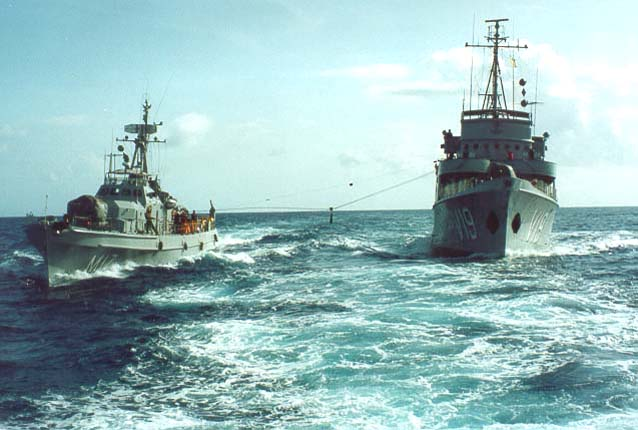
- Caboclo (right)

Class overview
- Builders: See table
- Operators: Brazilian Navy; Namibian Navy
- Preceded by: Carioca-class
- Succeeded by: Inhaúma-class
- Built: 1955
- Completed: 10
- Active: 1
- Lost: 1
- Preserved: 2

General characteristics
- Type: Corvette
- Displacement: 911 t (897 long tons; 1,004 short tons) (standard); 1,025 t (1,009 long tons; 1,130 short tons) (full load)
- Length: 55.72 m (182 ft 10 in)
- Beam: 9.55 m (31 ft 4 in)
- Draft: 3.6 m (11 ft 10 in)
- Installed power: 1,080 hp (810 kW)
- Propulsion: 2 Sulzer 6TD36 diesel engines, 6 cylinders each, directly coupled to 2 shafts with fixed pitch propellers
- Speed: 16 kn (30 km/h; 18 mph)
- Range: 15,000 nm (1.5×10^{−8} km; 9.3×10^{−9} mi)
- Crew: 64, including 6 officers
- Armament: 1 x 76.5 mm (3.01 in) Mk 25 cal. 50 cannon; 4 x 20 mm (0.787 in) Oerlikon; Mk 10 cal. 70 single mount machine guns

The Imperial Marinheiro class is a class of corvettes of the Brazilian Navy, consisting of ten vessels.

== Ships in the class ==
Name	Pennant number	Builder	Commissioned	Decommissioned	Fate
Imperial Marinheiro	V-15	C.C. Scheepsbouwer & Gashouder Bedrijf Jonker & Stans	1955	2014	Preserved as a museum ship in Rio Grande
Iguatemi	V-16	Zaandamsche Scheepsbouwer Mig N.V.	1955	1995	In reserve
Ipiranga	V-17	Scheepswerf Jonker & Stans	1955	1983	Wrecked off Point Sapata, Fernando de Noronha
Forte de Coimbra	V-18	Haan & Oerlemans N.V.	1955	1997	Stranded at the Port of Natal
Caboclo	V-19	Bodewes Scheepswerf	1955		
Angostura	V-20	Gusto Shipyard	1955	2004	In reserve
Bahiana	V-21	Scheepswerf Van Der Waal	1955	2002	In reserve
Mearim	V-22	Scheepswerven v.h. H.H. Bodewes	1955	1998	
Purus	V-23	Scheepswerf & Machinefabriek	1955	2002	Transferred to the Namibian Navy
Solimões	V-24	Gusto Shipyard	1955	2003	Preserved as a museum ship in Belém
