= USS Cushing (DD-797) =

Fletcher-class destroyer

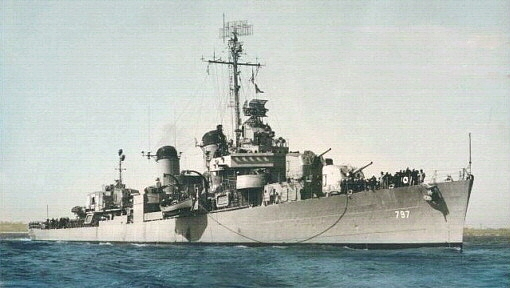

History

United States
- Name: USS Cushing (DD-797)
- Namesake: William B. Cushing
- Builder: Bethlehem Mariners Harbor, Staten Island
- Laid down: 3 May 1943
- Launched: 30 September 1943
- Commissioned: 17 January 1944
- Decommissioned: 3 February 1947
- Home port: Naval Station Bremerton
- Honors and awards: Six (6) battle stars

History

United States
- Recommissioned: 17 August 1951
- Decommissioned: 8 November 1960
- Honors and awards: Two (2) battle stars
- Loaned to Brazil: 20 July 1961

History

Brazil
- Name: Paraná (D29)
- Acquired: 20 July 1961
- Stricken: 1 August 1973
- Fate: Scrapped, 1982

General characteristics
- Class & type: Fletcher-class destroyer
- Displacement: 2,050 tons (standard); 2,500 tons (full load)
- Length: 376.5 ft (114.8 m)
- Beam: 39.5 ft (12.0 m)
- Draft: 12.5 ft (3.8 m)
- Propulsion: 4 Babcock & Wilcox oil-fired boilers; 2 General Electric geared steam turbines; 2 screws; =60,000shp (45 MW)
- Speed: 36.5 knots (67.6 km/h; 42.0 mph)
- Range: 5,500 nautical miles (10,200 km; 6,300 mi) at 15 kn (28 km/h; 17 mph)
- Complement: 329 officers and men
- Armament: 5 × single 5 inch/38 caliber guns guided by a Mark 37 Gun Fire Control System with Mk25 fire control radar linked by a Mark 1A Fire Control Computer stabilized by a Mk6 8,500 rpm gyro.; 6–10 × 40 mm Bofors AA guns (early ships carried 4 × 1.1 inch/75 caliber guns), 7–10 × 20 mm Oerlikon cannons, 10 × 21 inch torpedo tubes (2×5), 6 × K-guns, 2 × depth charge racks

USS Cushing (DD-797) was a Fletcher-class destroyer of the United States Navy, the fourth Navy ship named for Commander William B. Cushing (1842–1874), who distinguished himself during the American Civil War. Cushing was launched on 30 September 1943, by Bethlehem Steel Co., in Staten Island, New York; she was sponsored by Miss Katherine A. Cushing, a daughter of Commander Cushing. The vessel's commissioning was on 17 January 1944.

The Cushing was placed into active service twice by the United States Navy, first during World War II (earning six battle stars) and next during the Korean War (earning two additional battle stars). During WW II, she participated in the Mariana and Palau Islands campaign, the Battle of Angaur, the Philippines campaign, 1944-45, the Battle for Leyte Gulf, pre-invasion strikes on Iwo Jima and Okinawa, the Battle of Okinawa, and finally, strikes on the Tokyo area until the end of the war. For several months after the signing of the Japanese Instrument of Surrender, she served as the harbor entrance control vessel at Sagami Wan for the occupation forces before returning home. During the Korea conflict, Cushing served as plane guard and participated in bombardment of North Korea. After the war, she patrolled in the Taiwan Straits, and visited various ports strengthening national ties in the President Dwight D. Eisenhower's "People to People" program.

Cushing was loaned to Brazil in 1961 and served in the Brazilian Navy as Paraná (D29) for twelve years.

== Service history ==
=== World War II ===
Cushing sailed from Norfolk, Virginia on 5 May 1944, for training at Naval Stations San Diego and Pearl Harbor, then escorted a convoy to Eniwetok Atoll in the Marshall Islands, before returning to Naval Station Bremerton, Washington for an upgrade to her anti-submarine equipment. She joined the 5th Fleet at Eniwetok on 24 August 1944 to sortie for the invasion of the Palau Islands. She screened the Aircraft carriers during their strikes on Mindanao, Samar, Cebu, and Negros in the Philippines, then supported the ground forces in the Battle of Angaur on 17 September 1944. She returned to the carriers' screen for raids on Formosa (now Taiwan), Manila, and northern Luzon. These efforts neutralized Japanese bases for the scheduled invasion of the Philippines and resulted in the rescue of numerous downed aviators. Her anti-aircraft fire accounted for at least one Japanese plane during the heavy air attacks of 24 October in the epic Battle for Leyte Gulf. She returned to replenish at Ulithi Atoll in the Caroline Islands on 22 November 1944.

Sortieing with the Fast Carrier Task Force (then 3rd Fleet's TF 38, later 5th Fleet's TF 58) on 10 December 1944 for air strikes on Luzon, Cushing weathered the typhoon of 18 December 1944, and rescued survivors of less fortunate ships before returning to Ulithi on 24 December for storm repairs. She re-joined the task force on 1 January 1945 for air strikes on Formosa, Indo-China, China coast, and the Philippines until 28 January 1945.

Joining TF 58 for the strikes on the Japanese home islands, Cushing served as radar picket ship at the launching point and successfully directed the destruction of many Japanese aircraft trying to break through to attack the carriers. She screened the carriers for the pre-invasion strikes on Iwo Jima and Okinawa, and participated in "softening-up" bombardment of Okinawa. Serving as radar picket ship during the Battle of Okinawa, she provided fighter direction which accounted for many Japanese aircraft. After replenishing at Leyte in June, she rejoined the carriers for strikes on the Tokyo area until the end of the war. Anchoring in Sagami Wan on 27 August 1945, she served as harbor entrance control vessel for the occupation forces until sailing for home. Cushing returned home to Bremerton on 20 November 1945, and was placed out of commission, in reserve, at Long Beach on 3 February 1947.

Approx 20–23 December 1944, Cushing operated independently while rescuing some downed aviators. There were two notable incidents during this period. First there was the Betty, a twin-engined Japanese bomber. The Cushing lobbed some VT rounds at her, about 20,000 yards (18,000 m) (max range) to the west. The Betty, apparently damaged, came towards her, fishtailing to avoid heavy anti-aircraft artillery, when she was downed just off the stern of the Cushing, caused most likely by her 20 millimetres (0.79 in) rounds. It was possibly an early attempt at suicide attack. There was also a torpedo fired at the Cushing from a submarine, but it was detected by Sonar so that Cushing could turn and avoid.

=== 1951 – 1960 ===
Recommissioned on 17 August 1951, Cushing sailed from Long Beach on 15 November and arrived at Norfolk on 30 November to join the Atlantic Fleet. She conducted exercises in the North Atlantic and in the Caribbean, and cleared Norfolk on 7 January 1953 to join TF 77 off Korea for duty as plane guard. On 2 and 3 June she fired in the bombardment of Hodo Pando, North Korea. She visited Manila, Singapore, Colombo, Aden, Piraeus, Genoa, Cannes, and Algiers, before returning to Norfolk on 22 August from this cruise around the world. She cruised the east coast in anti-submarine exercises and reserve training, and in 1954 sailed to the Mediterranean for duty. Transferred to the Pacific Fleet, she arrived at Long Beach on 26 January 1955.

In tours of duty in the Far East in 1955, 1956, 1957–58, and 1959–60 Cushing served as plane guard and joined in hunter-killer exercises with TF 77, patrolled in the Taiwan Straits, and visited various ports strengthening national ties in the President Dwight D. Eisenhower's "People to People" program. While "stateside" she operated along the west coast in anti-submarine and anti-aircraft warfare exercises, and midshipmen and reserve training. Cushing's home port was changed to Charleston, South Carolina, in October 1960, and the destroyer sailed to the east coast. Cushing was again placed out of commission, in reserve, at Norfolk, Va., on 8 November 1960.

=== Brazilian service ===
Cushing was loaned to Brazil 20 July 1961. She served in the Brazilian Navy as Paraná (D29). Paraná was struck on 1 August 1973, and broken up for scrap in February 1982.

== Awards ==
Cushing received six battle stars for World War II service and two for Korean War service.
