= University of Namibia Department of Political Science =

- UNAM Political Science Department
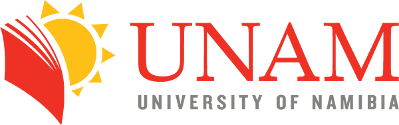
- Type: University Department
- Established: 1992
- Parent institution: University of Namibia
- Vice-Chancellor: Kenneth Matengu
- Principal: Phanuel Kaapama
- Dean: Jacob Nyambe
- Academic staff: 12
- Administrative staff: 3
- Students: 500
- Undergraduates: 450
- Postgraduates: 45
- Doctoral students: 5
- Location: 340 Mandume Ndemufayo Avenue, Pioneers Park, Windhoek, Khomas, Namibia
- Campus: UNAM Main Campus
- Language: English

The University of Namibia Political Science or UNAM Political Science Department, is a department within the University of Namibia's Faculty of Economic and Management studies in Windhoek Namibia. It is responsible for directing research and teaching programs in the fields of political science and social science. The department was first established in 1992 at the founding of the university. It offers undergraduate, postgraduate and PhD degrees level in Public Administration, Sociology, Political Science International Relations and Philosophy some of which are interfaculty linked.

== Recognition and research ==
The department has been the centre of key Namibian policy shift since its formation. It has also produced several notable political leaders to its ranks. Its Professor Emeritus André du Pisani has published over 50 research projects in mapping the future of Namibia since 1990. Phanuel Kaapama who heads the department has also at the appointment of President Hage Geingob been a chairperson or deputy chairperson of committees set up to revive the Namibian economy.

The department has also been a "training ground" for many political office leaders. Since its formation, it has contributed most members to the UNAM SRC than any department of the university with both Job Amupanda and Joseph Kalimbwe going on to elected Presidents of the 25 000 member student union in 2009 & 2017. Others include David Nangolo and Nahus Angula.

Amupanda went on to become the youngest Deputy dean in the history of the University of Namibia at the time of his appointment in 2016. In his book Kalimbwe described the department as "a highly competitive academic atmosphere, an absolute training ground for future political battles".

In April 2019, deputy president of Landless People's Movement (Namibia) Henny Seibeb graduated from the department.

== Notable alumni ==
- Peya Mushelenga - Former Minister of International Relations and Cooperation, MP
- Henny Seibeb - Former deputy leader of the Landless People's Movement (Namibia)
- Job Amupanda - Leader of the Affirmative Repositioning
- Joseph Kalimbwe - Zambian politician
- Alfredo Tjiurimo Hengari - Presidential Spokesperson of President Hage Geingob
- Tangeni Amupadhi - Editor of The Namibian
- Utaara Mootu - youth politician
- Inna Hengari - youth politician
- Maximalliant Katjimune- youth politician
- Tuikila Kaiyamo - Namibian Diplomat
