= UNAM SRC =

Legal representative governance of the University of Namibia

University of Namibia Student Representative Council
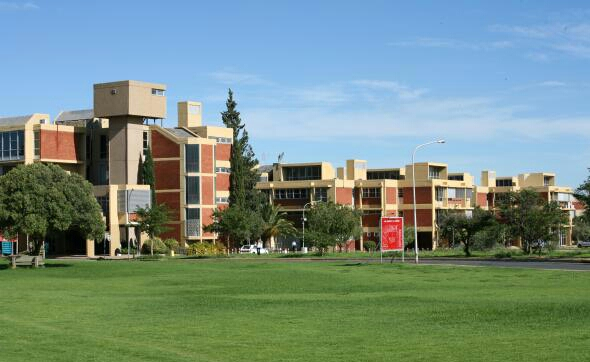
- A picture of the University of Namibia Main Campus in 2016
- Formation: 20 February 1992; 34 years ago
- Founded at: Windhoek, Namibia
- Type: Student Politics
- Headquarters: Windhoek, Main Campus
- Members: 28 000
- Official language: English
- Current SRC President: Enrico Simataa Goseb
- Budget: N$5.38 Million
- Staff: 150
- Website: http://www.unam.edu.na/ods/src-

University of Namibia Student Representative Council (also known as the UNAM SRC) was founded on 20 February 1992, and is recognised as the legal representative body for the students of the University of Namibia by the University of Namibia Act 18 of 1992. It is responsible for representing the interests of the students to the management of the university and to local and national government. It consists of representatives from all twelve campuses across Namibia.

== History ==
The UNAM SRC was founded on 20 February 1992 and mandated through a Namibian statute, namely: the University of Namibia Act 18 of 1992. Its primary focus is to represent the University of Namibia student body, and it falls under the Office of the Dean of Students. It is led by the president, who is elected on a yearly basis at the First Congress session and had a seat on the University Council alongside the Vice President of Congress.

== Controversies ==
Job Amupanda, Wise Immanuel, Francine Muyumba and Joseph Kalimbwe are quoted to have been controversial and extremely vocal SRC Presidents in the University of Namibia student council history despite going on to political leadership.

The UNAM SRC has been involved in controversies, some of which have been political, since its formation with most of its leaders going to take up leadership positions within the SWAPO Youth League and the political set up. However, since its formation, there has been controversy in terms of how the students should be represented at the university, with some student leaders choosing diplomacy and others being radical in their styles. Critics of the later, within the university, have accused them of occurring fame and popularity within student circles by influencing their constituency towards their beliefs. In June 2007, then SRC President Wise Immanuel and other students were expelled from the hostels for protesting the establishment of breakfast fees which the university had made compulsory to all hostel students. In 2008, Job Amupanda who served as SRC President was involved in a verbal warpath with some university members of staff claiming students are always regarded as "insignificant ants who should have their voices silenced".

In 2011, SRC President Francine Muyumba and other members of the Student Representative Council raised concerns with regards to the establishment of the Emona private hostel at the cost of N$300 Million, claiming there was need to address more pertinent issues than the interests of private investors. She was later made to apologise for tarnishing the name of the university. In January 2016, the SRC, inspired by the FeesMustFall protests in South Africa formed a university lock down for three days and blocked the two main university entrances as they demanded a decrease in fees. This followed instructions from the Namibia National Students Organization who had a week before locked the Namibia University of Science and Technology demanding free university registration. The lockdown standoff organized by NANSO and some members of the SRC only came to an end after the lawyers of the University of Namibia made an urgent court application in the Windhoek High Court.

On 3 February 2016, the court summoned then NANSO President Wilhlem Wilhlem, Vice President Stanley Kavetu and Secretary General Dimbulukeni Nauyoma to urgently stop the protests. The protest however led to the rise of popularism in Students Politics in Namibia. In October 2016, the SRC led by Joseph Kalimbwe barricaded the university's main administration building and blocked the entrances into the building for four hours as students sang protest songs following the decision by university Vice Chancellor Lazarus Hangula and the university management to block 9000 NSFAF funded and private students who still owed the university not to be allowed to seat for their end of year examinations. A #ExamsForAll campaign was initiated as students tore down exam timetables & demanded to see Vice Chancellor Hangula. The decision to ban students from exams was reversed 2 days later following the interventions of the Namibian Police Force and the education minister in stopping further protests. In 2017, SRC President Joseph Kalimbwe and three members of the student union were banned and removed from the university's main campus following an attempt to break into an unused food cafeteria to use it as a study area claiming there was not enough study areas during examination periods. They were later suspended and expelled following the events and asked not to visit the university's main campus until 2018. Kalimbwe was then arrested at the university main campus with the university stating that he had failed to register for his postgraduate studies. That same year, in May 2017, UNAM Oshakati Campus Vice President Junias Shilunga and three other members of the SRC stood and held placards with "We need hostels at Oshakati Campus" as soon as the university's deputy Vice Chancellor, Ellen Namhila, began to address the university's official opening of the northern campusses. Later in April 2017, Shilunga and his SRC colleagues set up an informal shack on the premises of the UNAM Oshakati campus, naming it "Hangula Shack" in reference to then Vice Chancellor Lazarus Hangula as they demanded that the university prioritizes the provision of a hostel at the campus. He was later called for a disciplinary hearing for his actions.

In June 2018, the SRC distanced itself from the new Nanso leadership claiming they were not politically hungry for positions to forget student plights.

== Student activities ==
The UNAM SRC provides leadership, leisure and academic activities to its students through the Housing Committee which caters for hostel students and is headed by the Representative for Accommodation, the Faculty Representatives who are headed by the Representative for Academic Affairs, and Societies which are headed by the Representative for Culture.

The University of Namibia Accounting Society is the current Best Society on Main Campus, with the University of Namibia Law Students Council as the second best. The latter was awarded the Best Society on Main Campus in 2018.

These activities are often broadcast on UNAM Radio from in and around the Main Campus. They include;

Society/Club	Type
UNAM Law Students Council (ULSC)	Academic
UNAM Accounting Society (UNAS)	Academic
UNAM Debate Society	Academic
UNAM History Society	Academic
UNAM Physics Society	Academic
UNAM Economics Society (ECON)	Academic
UNAM Sociology Society	Academic
Landless People's Movement (Namibia) Student Command Element	Political
UNAM SPYL	Political
Zimbabwe Society	International
Zambia Society	International
UNAM Choir	Music
UNAM Dance Club	Music
UNAM Christian Movement	Religion
Elcin	Religion

=== Others ===
- Otjiuana Cultural Group
- UNAM SDA
- UNAM Basketball Club
- UNAM Football Club - Competes in the Namibian Premier League

== Composition ==
The UNAM SRC President is only elected from the University of Namibia Main Campus.

The UNAM SRC consists of the following positions within it (as per campus):

=== Executive positions ===
- President (only Main Campus)
- Vice President
- Secretary General
- Secretary for Finance

=== Non-Executive positions ===
- Secretary for Information and Publicity Secretary
- Secretary for External Affairs
- Secretary for Internal Affairs
- Secretary for Community Development and Gender Affairs
- Secretary for Recreation
- Representative for Culture
- Representative for Academic Affairs
- Representative for Accommodation
- Representative for Sports
- Speaker of Student Parliament
- Executive Secretary to Student Parliament

=== Elections ===
Each year in September or October, the UNAM SRC elections are held at all of the university's twelve campuses to elect a new leadership. Each term commences on 1 January and concludes 31 December.

In February, the First Congress session, which consists of the following portfolios, from each of the twelve campus: Vice President, Secretary General, Secretary for Finance, Representative for Academic Affairs and Speaker of Student Parliament, elects the UNAM SRC President and Congress executives. Any of the above portfolios from the University of Namibia Main Campus may run for UNAM SRC President, who if elected is provided with an official residency and represents students on the University Council. The other portfolios can be taken up by any other campuses'candidates who have been elected in that respective portfolio, on campus-level.

== Former leaders ==
The former leaders who took up the Office of the UNAM SRC President;

President	Year in Office
Raphael Karuaihe	1993
Sima Luipert	1994
Lazarous Shitipamba	1995
Elsie Nghikembua	1996
Levy Komomungondo	1997
Annanias Haimbodi	1998
Edwin Kamatoto	1999
Jerome Kisting	2000
Anna Kaumbi	2001
Martin Shali Intamba	2002
Pamela Nasha	2003
Ezra Shilongo	2004
Moses Moses	2005
Kadiva Nghipondoka	2006
Wise Immanuel	2007
Tango Kandjaba	2008
Job Amupanda	2009
William Amutenya	2010
Francine Muyumba	2011
Edison Nengola	2012
Nahas Ekandjo Angula	2013
Desrie Beukes	2014
Vincent Shimwitwikeni	2015
Victoria Shipale	2016
Joseph Kalimbwe	2017
Tuhafeni Kalola	2018
Kudzai Sibanda	2019
Ginola Nauseb	2020
Lucia Ndishishi	2021
Malcolm Kambezera	2022
Pedro Muyo-yeta	2023
Twapewa-Ashihe Mungoba	2024

=== Other notable leaders ===
Name	Year in Office and position
Buckley Mwaba	2001/02 - Vice President
Hilma Moses	2016 - Vice President
Dean-Marlo Titus	2019 - Secretary General
Emma Theofelus	2018 - Secretary General
Jason Nangolo	2015 - Recreation
Tuikila Kaiyamo	2015 - External Affairs
Inna Hengari	2018 - Vice President
Patience Masua	2019 - Speaker of Parliament
Maximalliant Katjimune	2019 - Information and Publicity Secretary

== See also ==
- Namibia National Students Organization
- NUST SRC
- University of Namibia Department of Political Science
