= Job Amupanda =

Namibian academic and politician

Job Shipululo Amupanda
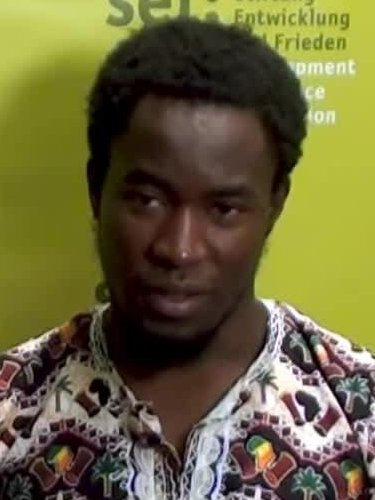
- Amupanda in 2019 at a youth protest on land in Windhoek

Mayor of Windhoek
- In office 2 December 2020 – 1 December 2021
- Preceded by: Fransina Kahungu
- Succeeded by: Sade Gawanas

Secretary for Information, Publicity and Mobilisation of the SWAPO Party Youth League
- In office 2012–2014

Deputy Dean & Associate Professor (Political Science) University of Namibia
- Incumbent
- Assumed office 2015

Personal details
- Born: 28 August 1987 (age 39) Omaalala, Oshana Region
- Party: Affirmative Repositioning
- Spouse: Taimi Iileka (m. 2019)
- Education: University of Namibia Stellenbosch University University of South Africa
- Occupation: Social justice activist, academic
- Profession: Political scientist
- Website: http://shipululo.blogspot.com/

Job Shipululo Amupanda (born 28 August 1987 in Omaalala, Oshana Region) is a Namibian activist, associate professor, and politician who served as Mayor of the City of Windhoek, in office from 2 December 2020 to 1 December 2021. He was an associate professor at the University of Namibia before he co-founded the Affirmative Repositioning movement, a movement set up by radical youth activists of the SWAPO Party Youth League in November 2014.

== Early life and education ==
Amupanda was born in northern Namibia, in a village called Omaalala in 1987. He was raised by his grandmother, Theopolina Adolf, whom he used to help sell merchandise as a child.

From 2005, Amupanda studied at the University of Namibia (UNAM), where he graduated with a bachelor's degree in political science, and from 2008 served as the president of the Students' Council, where he gained popularity during his tenure. Amupanda is currently a lecturer at the University of Namibia, as the Academic Dean of Political Science students.

=== Education ===
In 2010, he continued his studies at Stellenbosch University, where he graduated with a BA Honors in political science (2010) and an MA in political science (2012). He also holds a BA Honors in history from the University of South Africa. While at Stellenbosch, he founded the Stellenbosch Political Science Students Association (SPOSSA) and served as political education officer and later deputy secretary of the South African Students Congress. He dedicated his master's degree to the children of Namibia, especially those who went to school without shoes. In 2020, he graduated with a PhD in Political Studies at the University of Namibia. His dissertation is titled The Consolidated Diamond Mines and the Natives in Colonial Namibia: A Critical Analysis of the Role of Illegal Diamonds and the Development of Owamboland (1908 - 1990). Amupanda was one of the few radical youths in Namibia and is very outspoken on youth matters. He scooped the Windhoek Observer 2015 award of Newsmaker of the Year in the politics category, where he was competing with, amongst others, President Hage Geingob, and went on to get the Overall Newsmaker award for the year 2015.

In 2015, Amupanda started lecturing on political science at his alma mater, UNAM. A year later, he was appointed Deputy Dean of his faculty, the youngest at the institution at the time. Utaara Mootu, Inna Hengari, Joseph Kalimbwe, and Henny Seibeb were all his students.

== Activism career ==
Amupanda was first introduced to youth leadership when he was elected to the UNAM SRC in 2007 as secretary for information and publicity. The following year, he became president of the organisation at the age of 22.

In 2013, he joined the SWAPO Party Youth League after being elected as the SPYL secretary for mobilization and information by the structures of the youth wing. While at the party's youth organization, he advocated for land reforms and the democratization of state institutions. However, his stance of giving land to the landless Namibians was met with disagreements among the top four of the SWAPO Party, which included President Hifikepunye Pohamba, his then deputy Hage Geingob, party Secretary General Nangolo Mbumba, and his deputy, who together ruled to remove and expel Amupanda along with Dimbulukeni Nauyoma, George Kambala, and Elijah Ngurare from the party. After his expulsion from the party, Amupanda formed the Affirmative Repositioning movement to advocate for land and other issues affecting youths in Namibia.

Amupanda has represented the Windhoek Council as a member of the Board of Directors of the Association of Local Authorities in Namibia (ALAN) since April 2022.

== Personal life ==
On 17 August 2019, Amupanda married his long-time partner, Taimi Iileka. She is a Sisa Namandje Incorporation lawyer in a private ceremony at his hometown village of Omaalala. Amupanda lives in Windhoek. He is an avid boxing fan and participates in boxing activities.

== Affirmative Repositioning ==
Amupanda holds political admiration for Burkina Faso's Thomas Sankara, Zimbabwe's former president Robert Mugabe, South Africa's Steve Biko, Robert Sobukwe, and Julius Malema, leader of the Economic Freedom Fighters.

'As you are aware, attempts are being made to [...] reduce me into a jacket, a consequence and extension of other people's opinion. To reduce me into a silent zombie with no opinion but to clap hands and sing songs. It is being made clear that I must begin to look away even on matters of inconsistency. It is being made clear that I must appear indifferent even when those we represent are desperately looking for someone to stand up for them. This, comrade secretary, I cannot allow.'

— Job Amupanda, 2014 (extract from resignation letter addressed to SPYL SG Elijah Ngurare).

In November 2014, Amupanda, Dimbulukeni Nauyoma, and George Kambala, all of the SWAPO Youth League, occupied land in the affluent Klein Windhoek suburb as a means to demand land in the city, and in response to reports of corruption by the Windhoek municipality. They named their action Erf 2014 to coincide with the year of action. This move was seen by SWAPO as an illegal grab of municipal land, and all three activists were expelled. Amupanda had shortly before resigned from his position as spokesperson for the SWAPO Party Youth League.

Subsequently, Amupanda, Nauyoma, and Kambala formed the Affirmative Repositioning (AR) movement. The movement mobilized thousands of young people who turned up at the City of Windhoek's head office in Windhoek and submitted over 14,000 land application forms. He successfully challenged his expulsion from the party in court and was reinstated as a party member in May 2016. Amupanda represented his party (Affirmative Repositioning Party) in the election in Namibia on 27 November 2024.

== Mayor of Windhoek ==
In November 2019, Amupanda began to position himself for the position of Mayor of Windhoek under his organization, the Affirmative Repositioning Movement. On 2 December, following months of campaigning, he was elected Mayor of the city after the opposition voted in his favor to lead the municipality.
