= Dimbulukeni Nauyoma =

Namibian Youth Activist

Secretary General of the Namibia National Students Organisation
- In office 2015–2017

Personal details
- Born: 1992 (age 33–34) Windhoek, Namibia
- Education: Namibian Institute of Bankers; University of Namibia

Dimbulukeni 'Dee' Nauyoma (born 1992) is a Namibian youth activist who, along with Job Amupanda and George Kambala, co-founded a radical youth movement known as the Affirmative Repositioning in November 2014. Before the formation of the Affirmative Repositioning, he served in the SWAPO Youth League until 2014. From 2015 to 2018, he served as Secretary General of the Namibia National Students' Organisation.

== Personal life ==
Nauyoma attended the University of Namibia. He holds an advanced diploma in Banking, Finance & Credit from the Namibian Institute of Bankers (IOB), where he served as Student Representative Council president. He was one of the SWAPO Party Youth League leaders who were suspended and expelled from the party for occupying a plot in an upmarket Windhoek suburb.

== Involvement in student politics ==
Nauyoma first joined the Namibia National Student's Organisation in high school in 2008. He went on to become the chairperson of NANSO's Khomas Region branch. In 2015, he was elected Secretary General at the organisation's elective conference. Following the FeesMustFall movement initiated by Mcebo Dlamini and Chumani Maxwele in South Africa, Nauyoma led students at the University of Namibia and the Namibia University of Science and Technology in demanding a decrease in fees in 2016.

In 2016, he called on NSFAF to help allow underprivileged students to get access to education by providing them with registration assurances after both the University of Namibia and the Namibia University of Science and Technology stated that they needed assurance from the Department of Education before they could allow walk-ins.

== Affirmative Repositioning ==
In November 2014, the three AR youth leaders of Amupanda, Kambala, and Nauyoma occupied land in an affluent Klein Windhoek suburb as a means to demand land from the City of Windhoek municipality. They named their plot Erf 2014 to coincide with the year of action.

In 2016, the Namibian government announced plans to build a new Parliament. Thereafter, the Affirmative Repositioning movement began to mobilise young Namibians for a June 16 protest against the decision to build the parliament, saying resources could be used in more important areas in which the country faced critical problems.

== Political Parties ==
Nauyoma has been a member of Swapo, the AR, and the Namibian Economic Freedom Fighters. He was the head of the campaign for the Independent Candidate Ally Angula, who failed to register to partake in the 2024 presidential election. In November 2024, Nauyoma rejoined SWAPO at the final star rally held in Windhoek, just a few days before the Namibian 2024 election.
