= UNAM Choir =

Namibian music group

UNAM CHOIR
- Choir
- Founder: University of Namibia Music Department
- Music director: Bonnie Pereko
- Choirmaster: Bonnie Pereko
- Choir admission: 40
- Headquarters: Windhoek

UNAM Choir is a gospel singing group of the University of Namibia. Based in Windhoek, it is the largest choir group in Namibia which represented the country at International shows including in United States and China. The group has produced 3 albums since its inception and in 2017, celebrated its 20th anniversary. It is led by group instructor Bonnie Pereko who has been the group's conductor since 1997.

== History ==
The UNAM Choir was formed in 1992 but only became active in 1997 after the recruitment of Bonnie Pereko who been its lead composer for over 20 years. The group has had international appearances in several African countries including South Africa, Kenya, Zambia, Tanzania and Uganda. It is composed mainly of students from the University of Namibia's Windhoek main campus.

== Local Appearances ==
The Unam Choir has been a pinnacle of performances within Namibia. In 2004, the group performed at the celebration of then new president Hifikepunye Pohomba. At the 2006 National Theatre of Namibia concert, it won't the number one performance for group category.

== International Appearances ==
The group has represented the country in the United States, China, Kenya and Germany.

== Notable present and former members ==
The Unam Choir has since its formation produced members who have gone on to achieve music careers within Namibia and abroad. Some of them include;

- Anne Singer

Mr Bonnie Pereko

== See also ==
- UNAM SRC
- UNAM Radio
