= Allianssi =

Allianssi may refer to:

- Allianssi Vantaa, a Finnish football club
- Suomen nuorisoalan kattojärjestö Allianssi ry, the Finnish National Youth Council
