= Katutura Central =

Electoral constituency in the Khomas region of central Namibia

Coordinates: 22°31′23″S 17°03′37″E

Katutura Central constituency (red) in the Khomas Region

Katutura Central is a constituency in the Khomas Region of Namibia, comprising the extensions 2–5 and 7–11 of Windhoek's suburb Katutura. Katutura is a township that was founded by the then apartheid government of Namibia for black people in the 1950s, when the previous township, Old Location, was converted into the suburb Hochland Park.

Katutura Central had a population of 24,608 in 2011, up from 21,243 in 2001. As of 2020, it has 19,340 registered voters. The majority of households in this constituency are headed by women. 74% of the employed residents work for other people (as gardeners or house keepers) instead of for companies.

== Politics ==
Katutura Central is traditionally a stronghold of the South West Africa People's Organization (SWAPO) party. In the 2004 regional election, SWAPO candidate Helster Gawanab received 1,732 of the 5,180 votes cast and became councillor.

The 2015 regional elections were won by Ambrosius Kandjii of SWAPO with 3,009 votes. Joseph Kauandenge of the National Unity Democratic Organisation (NUDO) came second with 930 votes, followed by Bensen Katjirijova of the Democratic Turnhalle Alliance (DTA, 718 votes). In the 2020 regional election an opposition candidate became constituency councillor. Vezemba Katjaimo of the Popular Democratic Movement (PDM, the new name of the DTA) obtained 1,983 votes, well ahead of Michael Aihuki (SWAPO, 976 votes) and Delphia Suxus of the Landless People's Movement (LPM, a new party registered in 2018) with 879 votes.
