= Herero =

Herero may refer to:

- Herero people, a people belonging to the Bantu group, with about 240,000 members alive today
- Herero language, a language of the Bantu family (Niger-Congo group)
- Herero and Nama genocide
- Herero chat, a species of bird in the family Muscicapidae
- Herero Day, a gathering of the Herero people of Namibia to commemorate their deceased chieftains
- Herero Mall, an informal business area in the Katutura suburb of Windhoek, the capital of Namibia
- Herero Wars, a series of colonial wars between the German Empire and the Herero people of German South-West Africa (1904–1908)
