= Katutura Community Radio =

Radio station in Windhoek, Namibia

Katutura Community Radio (KCR) is a community radio station based in Katutura, Windhoek, Khomas Region, Namibia.

== History and mission ==
KCR was launched in 1995, "with initial funding from a range of agencies, including UNESCO, which was instrumental in providing the transmitter equipment". KCR aims to give a "platform for bottom-up, participatory communication, education, debate, advocacy and lobbying and to give residents of marginalized sectors of the community, particularly residents of Katutura and Khomasdal, an opportunity to express themselves on their own terms". The station signed an agreement in 2000 with the British Broadcasting Corporation to rebroadcast their programs.

In February 2001, it lost its broadcasting license on the basis that it was not broadcasting and that it had failed to pay the licensing fees. It was back on the air after obtaining new sponsorship in September 2003.

The station has been involved in setting up local comedy workshops with other local theater groups.
