= Ally Angula =

Namibian accountant

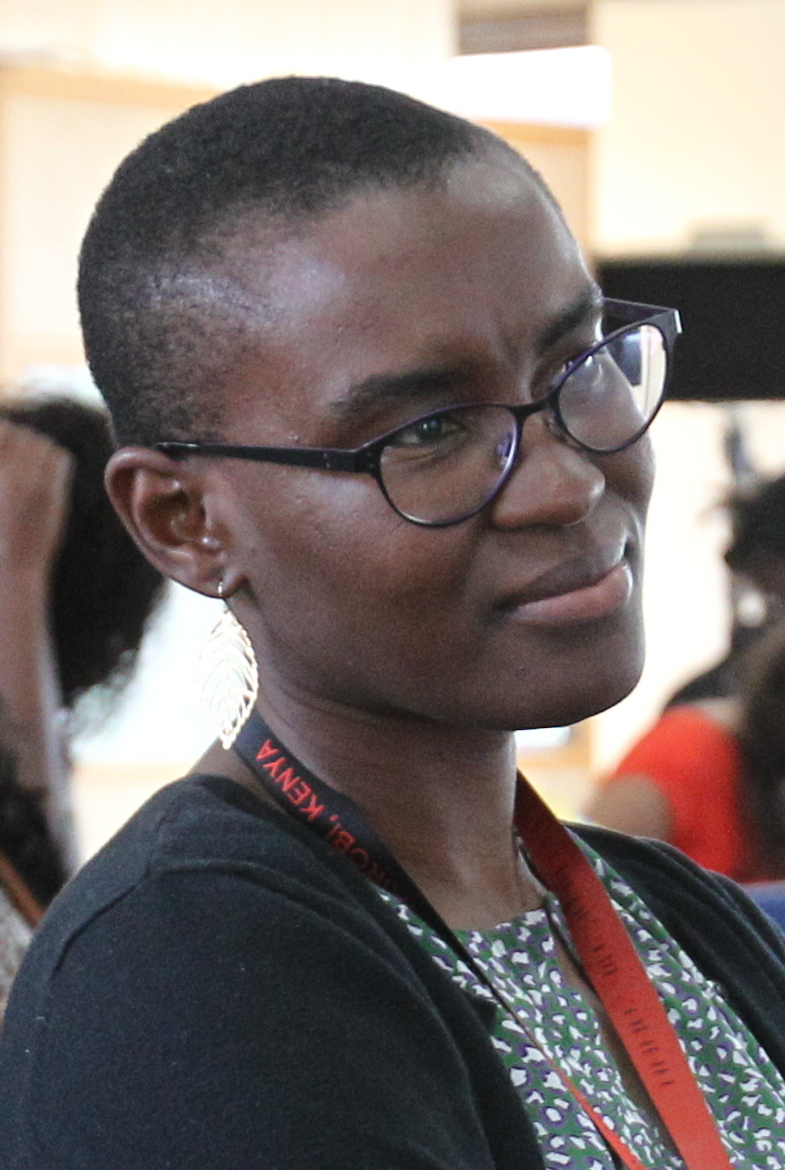
- Ally Angula (2015)
- Born: Ally Shaningwa Inedhimbwa Angula; 1979 (age 46–47)
- Education: University of Namibia
- Occupations: Accountant and Business executive
- Years active: 2006- present
- Title: Co-founder at Leap Holdings
- Movement: A Better Life Movement
- Website: Ally Angula

Ally Shaningwa Inedhimbwa Angula, simply referred to as Ally Angula (born 1979), is a Namibian accountant, business executive, and politician. Angula campaigned to run as an independent presidential candidate in the 2024 Namibian general election, which took place in November 2024. In October 2024, her bid was rejected by the Electoral Commission of Namibia when she failed to secure enough supporters to justify her candidacy.

Angula is a Chartered Accountant with extensive background in accounting and business management in Namibia. She is the co-founder and managing director of Leap Holdings, a Namibian holding company with subsidiaries in commercial farming, garment manufacturing, and retail. She is also the principal founder of The CFO Namibia, a Chartered Accountancy and Financial Advisory firm she founded in 2019. Prior to this, between 2006 and 2013, Angula was a partner at KPMG Namibia. Angula also served as Deputy Executive Director of the Ministry of Finance between December 2018 and August 2019.

== Education ==
Angula pursued her higher education at the University of Namibia, earning a bachelor's degree in accounting in 2001. She also has a bachelor's degree in commerce from University of Natal.

== Career ==
Angula has had a rich career in accounting and finance. In 2005, Angula joined KPMG Namibia, she started serving as an audit manager and was raised to KPMG Partner, where she was heading Financial Services and Energy and Natural Resources in Namibia from 2007 to 2013. Between 2006 and 2007, Angula was also among the senior partners of Swart Grant Angula, a Namibian accounting firm.

In May 2017, Angula was appointed by the Minister of Mines and Energy to advise the boards of the National Petroleum Corporation of Namibia (Namcor). In the end of 2018, Angula was appointed as the Deputy Executive Director at the Ministry of Finance, where she played a significant role in reforming financial reporting. She resigned in August 2019, reportedly due to clashes with older officials who opposed her reforms. In 2018, Angula was also appointed as a Committee Chairperson of the Namibia Public Private Partnership Committee at the Ministry of Finance.

== Business career ==
=== Leap Holdings ===
Angula is the CEO of Leap Holdings, a Namibian integrated group of companies, she co-founded with her husband in 2013. The group is involved in commercial farming, garment manufacturing, and retail, with operating subsidiary companies including Leap Agribusiness Ltd., Leap Manufacturing Namibia Ltd., and Leap Retail Ltd. Under her leadership, Leap Holdings operates My Republik, Namibia's commercial clothing brand, which earned Angula the 'Best Woman-Owned Business' award at the Global Entrepreneurship Summit (GES) in 2015. Leap Holdings has expanded its agricultural operations, installed advanced irrigation systems, and explored new ventures such as growing bamboo in Namibia. My Republik's collaboration with the makers of the film "Katutura" showcased a unique synergy between fashion and film, highlighting Angula's commitment to promoting Namibian creativity and industry. Through her leadership, Angula has cemented her position as a key figure in Namibia's entrepreneurial landscape, continuously advocating for local innovation and industry growth.

== Additional career ==
Angula has served on various boards, including Oryx Properties Limited (Vice Chairperson), Pupkewitz Holdings, and Nabo Holdings. She has chaired the Audit and Risk Committees of the Bank of Namibia, Rössing Uranium Limited, and Oryx Properties.

== Presidential candidacy ==
Angula launched her manifesto as an independent presidential candidate on May 1, 2024. As the founder of the “A Better Life” movement, Angula champions the dignity of Namibians, aiming to address societal challenges from a political platform. Her manifesto focuses on economic transformation, job creation, youth empowerment, and improving healthcare and education in Namibia. Her candidacy was supported by the United People's Movement (UPM) and the National Empowerment Fighting Corruption (NEFC) party. The alliance was formally signed by UPM president Jan van Wyk and NEFC president Kenneth Lilonga. In October 2024, the Electoral Commission of Namibia rejected her bid for candidacy when she failed to secure the required 500 supporting signatures per electoral region.

== Recognitions ==
- 2013: A Desmond Tutu Fellowship Programme Associate.
- 2015: Selected to attend the Global Entrepreneurship Summit hosted by US President Barack Obama in Kenya.
- 2015: 'Best Woman-Owned Business' award at the Global Entrepreneurship Summit GES 2015.
- 2015: First Namibian to join the Forum of Young Global Leaders by the World Economic Forum.

== Social impact ==
Angula is an activist. In 2024, she participated in protests with people of Katutura to highlight socio-economic issues and demonstrate her commitment to addressing the concerns of ordinary Namibians. In addition to the protests in Katutura, Angula has participated in demonstrations in other areas of Windhoek, including the central business district and the vicinity of government offices. These locations were chosen to maximize visibility and impact on key decision-makers.

== Personal life ==
Angula has two children, and she is a niece to former prime minister Nahas Angula.
