= National Youth Council =

A National Youth Council is a representative body made up of youth organizations and young people in a particular state or nation. Many were formed after the Second World War to attend the World Festival of Youth and later the World Assembly of Youth.

Many National Youth Councils receive funding from the government in which they operate and are affiliated with a regional federation:

- Europe: European Youth Forum (YFJ)
- Africa: Panafrican Youth Union (PAYU)
- Latin America: Foro Latin-America de Juventud (FLAJ)

Regional federations may be part of the International Coordination Meeting of Youth Organisations (ICMYO) and cooperate in the form of the Global Cooperation Coordination Committee (GCCC).

== See also ==
- Scouts Australia National Youth Council, the peak youth advisory body within Scouts Australia
- National Youth Council Singapore, an autonomous agency under the Ministry of Culture, Community and Youth
