= Windhoek East =

Electoral constituency in the Khomas region of central Namibia

Coordinates: 22°34′S 17°06′E

Windhoek East constituency (red) in the Khomas Region

Windhoek East is a constituency in the Khomas Region of Namibia. It consists of the upper-class suburbs of Windhoek: Auasblick, Avis, Klein Windhoek, Ludwigsdorf, Luxury Hill, Olympia, and Suiderhof. It had a population of 22,712 in 2011, up from 17,674 in 2001. As of 2020, it has 17,308 registered voters.

Windhoek East is the most affluent constituency of Windhoek. Most embassies, private schools, private medical facilities, and shopping malls are located here, and the education rate of the inhabitants is high. All its roads are tarred. There is a concerning crime rate but the offenders come from other constituencies. The Namibian newspaper suspects the constituency to have been gerrymandered by the SWAPO-led government; Besides the posh suburbs it contains a Police academy and Windhoek's two army bases.

== Politics ==
In the 2004 regional election, SWAPO candidate Mwadina Rosalia Sibiya received 2.141 of the 4,265 votes cast and became councillor. Nic Kruger, a member of the Rally for Democracy and Progress (RDP), surprisingly won the constituency in the 2010 local and regional elections. The 2015 regional election were won by SWAPO whose Ruusa Namuhuja gained 1,795 votes. Jens Schneider of the RDP came second with 1,169 votes, followed by Raymond Reginald Diergaardt of the Democratic Turnhalle Alliance (DTA) with 743 votes.

In the 2020 regional election an opposition candidate became constituency councillor again. Kephas Brian Black of the Independent Patriots for Change (IPC), an opposition party formed in August 2020, won with 3,715 votes, followed by Petrus Cornelius Senekal of the Popular Democratic Movement (PDM, the new name of the DTA) with 2,511 votes. The SWAPO candidate Felix Tjozongoro came only third, gathering 1,615 votes.
