= LPM Youth and Student Command Element =

Namibian youth movement

- Founded at: Windhoek
- Type: Youth and Student Movement
- Headquarters: Windhoek, Namibia
- Region served: 12
- Services: Representing Youths and Students in Namibia through the values of LPM
- Lead Commander: Duminga Ndala
- Spokesperson: William Minnie
- Treasurer General: Hangula Hafeni Mushishi Hangula

The LPM Youth and Students Command Element is a youth and student wing of the Landless People's Movement (Namibia). Formed in 2018, the wing has been led by Duminga Ndala since its inception.

== Representation ==
The LPM youth and student command element was formed to fight for the social and economic rights of youths and students in Namibia. In December 2020, the organisation raised strong complaints against singer Adora after she made what the organization said were tribal remarks.
