= UNAM School of Medicine =

UNAM School of Medicine may refer to:

- UNAM School of Medicine (Namibia)
- School of Medicine, UNAM, Mexico
