= Edson Isaacks =

Namibian politician (born 1973)

Edson Isaacks MP

Member of the National Assembly of Namibia
- Incumbent
- Assumed office 20 March 2020

Personal details
- Born: Edson E. Isaacks; 10 July 1973 (age 53) Windhoek, South West Africa
- Party: Landless People's Movement
- Education: University of Namibia
- Occupation: Member of Parliament
- Profession: Educator; Farmer; Politician

Edson E. Isaacks (born 10 July 1973) is a Namibian educator, farmer and politician serving as a Member of the National Assembly of Namibia since March 2020. He is the operative secretary of the Landless People's Movement.

== Biography ==
Isaacks was born on 10 July 1973 in Windhoek, South West Africa. He studied at the University of Namibia where he obtained a bachelor's degree in education. He then worked as a teacher and a farmer.

Isaacks joined the Landless People's Movement and was appointed the party's operative secretary, a post similar to any given political party's secretary-general position. He was one of the party's parliamentary candidates for the 2019 general election. He was elected as the party won four seats in parliament. Isaacks took office as a Member of the National Assembly on 20 March 2020.
