= NUST SRC =

Student Union

- Formation: January 10, 1995; 31 years ago
- Founded at: Windhoek
- Type: Student Representation
- Legal status: Active
- Headquarters: Windhoek
- Location: Namibia
- Region served: Khomas
- Fields: Politics
- Members: 17 000
- Official language: English
- Affiliations: Namibia National Students Organization
- Staff: 15
- Volunteers: 8

NUST SRC is the legal student representative body of the Namibia University of Science and Technology students in Namibia. Based on Windhoek, it was formed in 1995 and represents 19 000 students of the university's student population.

== See also ==
- Namibia National Students Organization
- UNAM SRC
