= Elizabeth Amukugo =

Namibian politician

Professor at the University of Namibia

Personal details
- Born: 1 August 1954 (age 72) Okapya, Ondangwa, Oshana Region
- Education: Lund University
- Profession: Politician

Elizabeth Magano Amukugo (born 1 August 1954, in Windhoek, Khomas Region) is a Namibian politician and academic with the University of Namibia.

== Early life ==
Amukugo attended Primary education at Onayena Primary School in 1963 to 1970 and received Secondary education at the then Ongwediva Secondary School from which she was expelled for political reasons. She became a member of SWAPO in 1974 and went into exile in Angola the same year, she continued into Zambia and then left to finish her education with Agha Khan Academy in Nairobi, Kenya. Afterwards, she left for Sweden through Tanzania after her marriage to fellow Politician Ambassador Kaire Mbuende.

== Academic and political career ==
Amukugo studied with Lund University in Sweden earning Masters of Science in Sociology & Education, Masters in Social Science from Lund University, as well as Philosophy Degree in Education. While in Sweden she worked actively with several organisations such as the Africa Groups, ISAK, ABF and several political parties. Amukugo was a member of the Parliament of Namibia from 2000 to 2005 and served on the Standing Committee on Governmental Affairs, Standing Committee on the Reports of the Ombudsman also on the Standing Committee on Human Resources, Equality & Gender as well as Senior Representative of the Commonwealth Parliamentary Association Namibia Branch, Member of the National Executive Committee and of the National Council for the Congress of Democrats (CoD)

Amukugo was a Research Fellow with Lund University in Sweden from 1987 to 1990, a Lecturer with the former Academy for Tertiary Education now the Namibia University of Science and Technology around 1990 and 1991. She then served as Chief for Multilateral Co-operation with the Namibian National Planning Commission from 1991 to 1996. An academic by profession, Amukugo was Senior Lecturer in Philosophy of Education from 1996 to 2000 with the University of Namibia, and Senate & Head of the Department of Educational Foundations & Management with University of Namibia from 1997 to 2000.

She is currently an Associate Professor with the University of Namibia Educational Foundations and Management, she authored Democracy and Education in Namibia and beyond in 2017 and Education and Politics in Namibia. Past Trends and Future Prospects.
