= 2027 Africa Cup of Nations bids =

Bids for men's football championship of Africa

The 2027 Africa Cup of Nations bids entails the bids for the 2027 Africa Cup of Nations. The winners were Kenya, Tanzania and Uganda.

== Bidding timeline ==
A decision on the host was originally supposed to be made at the CAF summit in either late 2022 or early 2023.

On 27 April 2023, the CAF Executive Committee announced the bidding process of the tournament. The bidding timeline is as follows:

- 23 May 2023: Deadline for Member Associations to submit their final bid, including all bidding and hosting documents (hosting agreement, host cities agreement, government guarantees, etc.), which should be signed.
- 1 June – 15 July 2023: Inspection visits
- 27 September 2023: Appointment of Host Country/Countries by the CAF Executive Committee

== Bids ==
Text in bold indicates a winning bid.

- Botswana and Zambia

Initially a joint bid with Namibia, but on 19 April 2022, Namibia pulled out after the national government failed to approve a budget. After that, Botswana entered as a solo bid, before joining up with Zambia just before the vote after Zambia withdrew from the 2025 Africa Cup of Nations bidding process. Botswana supposedly spent 61 million Pula in order to receive the hosting rights.

- Egypt

When CAF announced the 2027 bids, Egypt was included. Had they won, it would've been only eight years after they hosted the 2019 edition.

- Nigeria and Benin

After originally wanting 2025, Nigeria and Benin decided to put in a late bid for 2027. Shortly before the vote, the House Committee on Sports in the Federal House of Representatives informed the Nigeria Football Federation that they need to withdraw. Some media outlets said Nigeria and Benin's bid was the favourite to win, while others were saying they would receive the 2029 Africa Cup of Nations hosting rights.

- Senegal

Despite not being on the list of bidding countries, Senegal was allowed to bid. The bidders learnt about their inclusion in the bidding process on the 3 May 2023 After Algeria withdrew, the Senegalese bid was considered as the favourite to win.

- **Kenya, Tanzania and Uganda** (**PAMOJA 2027**)

Having initially started as a Tanzania and Uganda bid, due to Kenya's suspension from FIFA, Kenya joined the bid after their FIFA suspension was lifted, with the Kenyan government approving the bid proposal on 6 December 2022. After a stampede in Tanzania killed 1 and injured 30, doubts were raised about the bid's ability to host the event. The three countries were banking on their commercial viability rather than their results on the pitch to win the bid and to bring the tournament back to East Africa for the first time in 51 years.

== Withdrawn bids ==
- Algeria

Also bid for the 2025 edition. On 26 September 2023, Algeria announced their withdrawal of both 2025 and 2027 bids. There reasons were that they wanted to revitalise Algerian Football and also thought that the bidding process was biased towards Morocco for 2025. However, to avoid a fine from CAF, they still submitted their files to CAF for evaluation.

- Botswana

After Namibia withdrew, Botswana were unsure about continuing their bid after Namibia withdrew from the joint-bid. In the end, Botswana's name was on the list of bidding countries. The president of the Botswana Football Association, Maclean Letshwiti, stated that he was still confident that Botswana could still win. On the 24 May, the Botswana filed their bid book, earmarking proposed facilities in Gaborone, Maun and Kasane. On the 16 June, Gabane and Lobatse were confirmed as part of the bid. But shortly before the vote, they merged their bid with Zambia, who at the same time, withdrew from the 2025 bidding process.

- Botswana and Namibia (BONA 2027)
- Botswana was the first country to express an interest in hosting this edition, stating their intent to bid in October 2021.
- On the 21 January 2022, during the 2021 Africa Cup of Nations, Botswana sent a letter to the Namibia Football Association to see if they were willing to join their bid.
- Then, on the 18 March 2022, the Namibian Minister of Information and Communication Technology, Peya Mushelenga, approved their part of the bid.
- Afterwards, on the 4 May 2022, CAF president, Patrice Motsepe, met Botswana's Minister of Sport, Gender, Youth and Culture, Tumiso Rakgare, as well as officials from the Botswana Football Association to discuss the bid.
- On 10 June 2022, both countries signed a memorandum of agreement for hosting the tournament. Nicknamed BONA 2027, Botswana would take 60% of the responsibility of the hosting, while Namibia would take the remaining 40%. Also, in regards to stadiums, Botswana would bring 4 stadiums and Namibia would have 2.
- In December 2022, The government of Botswana allocated, 1.1 billion Pula for the tournament.
- In March 2023, Both countries considered bringing in a third country in the bid, with Zambia being the likely option.
- But then suddenly, on the 20 April 2023, a week before the deadline for Member Associations to submit their final bid, Namibia withdrew. They stated that Namibia could not fulfill the financial requirements for their portion of the bid. Popular Democratic Movement (PDM) member, Maximilliant Katjimune was very critical of the decision to withdraw, accusing the government of embarrassing the country by withdrawing from the joint bid.

The proposed venues were as follows:

Botswana

Gaborone
Maun
Francistown

Namibia

Windhoek
Swakopmund
Oshakati

- Burkina Faso

Burkina Faso was rumoured to bid for 2027, but were not included on the list of bidding nations.

- Sierra Leone

After a meeting with CAF president, Patrice Motsepe, spoke with the government of Sierra Leone to about potentially hosting AFCON.

- Zambia

Zambia was rumoured to bid for 2027, but were not included on the list of bidding nations. Although, they would join up with Botswana for a joint bid shortly before the vote for 2027.

== Host announcement ==
On the 27 September 2023, Kenya, Tanzania and Uganda was announced as the hosts of the tournament. Of the 15 voters, the East African bid reportedly received 11 votes.

== Controversy ==
Sports Minister of Botswana, Tumiso Rakgare, was adamant that their bid book was the best and felt cheated out of winning the hosting rights. Authorities in Botswana also disliked the fact that they did not publicise the voting results. In response, CAF stated that their bidding process was transparent.
