= Perivoli Schools Trust =

Education project in Africa

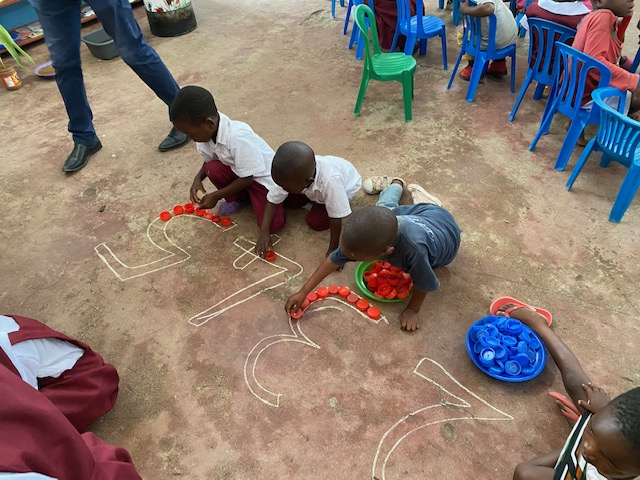
Children in Malawi taking part in the Perivoli Schools Trust programme in 2020

The Perivoli Schools Trust (PST) was established in 2012 and operates a nursery school teacher training programme in countries across sub-Saharan Africa.

== History ==
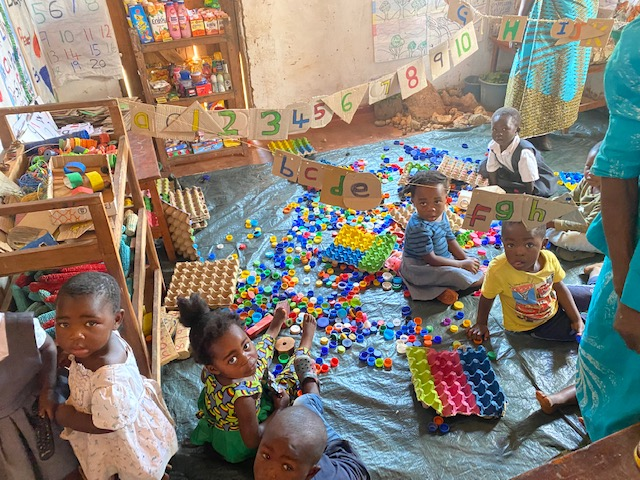
Children taking part in Perivoli Schools Trust programme.

The Perivoli Schools Trust was established by the Perivoli Trust and funded by the Perivoli Foundation. Perivoli Foundation is funded by the Perivoli Trust and also by Perivoli Innovation s, a technology venture fund. The Perivoli Trust was settled by James Alexandroff. In 2022 he received an Award for Transformative Philanthropy from The University of Bristol. He was awarded an OBE in the New Year Honours 2023 Overseas and International List for his services to Education in Africa. He co-founded Singapore-based emerging markets investment management firm Arisaig Partners in 1996 and donated his one third share to the Perivoli Trust in 1999.

Maya Kafuwa and her husband Titan Madomba are the current joint CEOs of the Perivoli Schools Trust.

== Activities ==
The programme shows nursery school teachers the importance of play and how to make games and educational activities out of recyclable waste materials, such as yoghurt cartons, bottle tops, toilet rolls, pieces of cardboard, discarded garments and tin cans

In 2025 more than 32,000 nursery school teachers have received training through the work of the trust, reaching 1.2 million children across six countries, with a 2035 target to train 200,000 teachers across eight countries and reach five million children.

== Measurement and Impact ==
The Perivoli Foundation supported a three-year external assessment of the programme by the School for Policy Studies at the University of Bristol through the Perivoli Africa Research Centre (PARC) and the School of Social of Humanities, Society and Development at the University of Namibia on the impact of the Perivoli Schools Trust programme in Namibia. The published report, titled “The Perivoli Schools Trust Early Child Care and Education Model: exploring lived experiences and wider social impacts” concludes that the programme has been positively received by communities across Namibia. The project found that the work of the Perivoli Schools Trust supports early childhood education through innovative approaches like learning through play and recycled materials, while also improving educators’ teaching practices. The report reveals the programme has incited capacity building, economic opportunities, and community-wide benefits, and displays strong environmental credentials.

== Awards ==
In 2022, Perivoli Schools Trust was awarded a bronze level award in the Educational Excellence category at the 2022 Global Good Awards. The programme also won an International Green Apple Environment Award and was shortlisted for Project of the Year award at the 2022 Business Charity Awards.
