= Duminga Ndala =

Namibian youth leader and politician

- Other names: Kakuhu
- Occupation: Politics
- Years active: 2019 - Present
- Known for: Landless People's Movement Youth Chairperson

Duminga Kakuhu Ndala is a Namibian youth leader and politician who currently serves as Chairperson of the Namibian opposition, Landless People's Movement (Namibia) Youth Command Element.

== Education ==
Ndala was educated at the University of Namibia where she graduated with a political science degree in 2019.

== Politics ==
Ndala has been the inaugural leader of the LPM Youth element. One of the key youth members of the party's youth organizers, she leads its youth wing. In 2020, she contested for Namibian local authority elections.
