= Patience Masua =

Namibian politician and activist

Member of the National Assembly
- In office 28 April 2021 – 20 March 2025
- President: Hage Geingob
- Prime Minister: Saara Kuugongelwa

Personal details
- Born: January 7, 1999 (age 27) Namibia
- Party: SWAPO
- Education: University of Namibia

Patience Masua (born 7 January 1999) is a Namibian politician and lawyer. She served in the National Assembly after being appointed by president Hage Geingob in April 2021, becoming Namibia's youngest member of parliament. Previously, she was secretary general of Namibia National Students Organization and served in the UNAM SRC as student parliamentary speaker. Masua served her term until 20 March 2025 but was not reappointed by president Netumbo Nandi-Ndaitwah.

== Early life ==
Masua was born in Gobabis, Omaheke, on 7 January 1999, after that, her family moved to Windhoek. She attended pre and primary school at Kleine Professor College. She finished primary school at Suiderhof Primary School and proceeded to complete her high school at Delta Secondary School Windhoek where she served as deputy head girl in the Learners Representative Council.

== Student politics and activism ==
Masua entered mainstream student politics and activism in university, primarily through her newspaper opinion pieces and then serving in the student union as faculty representative for the University of Namibia Faculty of Law. Later she ran for the position of speaker of student parliament of the UNAM SRC and won it in 2019. Thereafter she served as secretary general for the Namibia National Students Organisation (NANSO).

== Community Work ==
In 2021, Masua founded the Patience Masua Foundation Africa (PMF Africa).
