= CFY =

CFY can refer to:

- Clinical fellowship year, a kind of training needed to pursue a career in speech–language pathology
- Caribbean Federation of Youth, an organization in the International Coordination Meeting of Youth Organisations
