= Seibeb =

Seibeb is a surname. Notable people with the surname include:

- Henny Seibeb (born 1978), Namibian politician
- Raul Costa Seibeb (1992–2017), Namibian racing cyclist
