= Nujoma (surname) =

Nujoma is a surname, and may refer to:

- Sam Nujoma
- Utoni Nujoma
- Sam Nujoma Jr.
- Kovambo Nujoma
