= Maximalliant Katjimune =

Namibian politician and activist

Member of National Assembly
- In office June 2022 – 21 March 2025
- President: McHenry Venaani

Personal details
- Born: February 11, 1998 (age 28) Namibia
- Party: Popular Democratic Movement
- Education: University of Namibia

Maximalliant Tjekupe Katjimune (born 11 February 1998) is a Namibian politician who served as Member of Parliament from the Popular Democratic Movement from 2022 to 2025.

== Education ==
Katjimune attended Namibia Primary School (NEPS) in Katutura, Windhoek from 2005 to 2011. He then attended Jan Mohr Secondary School from 2012 to 2016, before enrolling at the University of Namibia where he did a Bachelor of Arts in Political Studies and Sociology.

== Career ==
Katjimune joined student politics at Jan Mohr Secondary School when he was recruited into the Namibia National Students Organisation (NANSO). In 2015, he set up the first ever NANSO branch at Jan Mohr Secondary School, at a time when the school was dominated by a history of apartheid and anti-activism. He was elected the Branch Chairperson in 2015. In 2016, he was elected to the NANSO Khomas Regional Executive Committee (KREC) as the Regional Secretary for Political and Internal Affairs.

During his years at the University of Namibia, he served as the Faculty Representative for the Faculty of Humanities and Social Sciences, the Spokesperson of the SRC as well as the SRC Speaker of Parliament. He joined mainstream politics in 2018 when he joined the PDMYL and was subsequently appointed as the National Spokesperson of the PDMYL. In September 2019, he was nominated as part of McHenry Venaani's 5 candidates to form part of the PDM's list to the National Assembly at the age of 21, thus becoming one of the youngest candidates ever to be nominated to a party list for the National Assembly. He was initially placed number 22 on the PDM list, and the PDM only attained 16 seats hence he was initially not sworn in as a member of the National Assembly on 20 March 2020. He then worked as a Researcher and Speechwriter for the PDM Parliamentary Caucus from June 2020 to May 2022, whereafter he was sworn in as a Member of the National Assembly on 6 June 2022 at the age of 24 following a Supreme Court judgment regarding the PDM list.
