= André du Pisani =

Namibian political scientist, author and professor

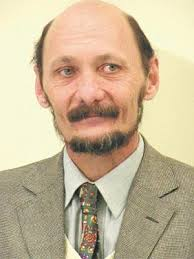
- du Pisani in 2015
- Born: 15 January 1949 (age 77); Windhoek, South West Africa
- Occupations: Political scientist, author, professor

Academic background
- Education: Stellenbosch University; London School of Economics; University of Cape Town; University of Cambridge

Academic work
- Institutions: University of Namibia
- Main interests: Political science

André du Pisani (born 15 January 1949) is a Namibian political scientist and author of several books, articles, and journal publications. He has written several conference papers for SADC, the Namibian government and several ministries; he is a professor at the University of Namibia Department of Political Science. Du Pisani has been a professor at the university since 1998.

== Education ==
The Windhoek native earned his bachelor's degree from Stellenbosch University in South Africa in 1971 and an honours in politics from Stellenbosch in 1972. He later earned a master's degree in politics from Stellenbosch in 1975. From 1975 to 1976, du Pisani was a research student at the London School of Economics. In 1988, he earned his Ph.D. in politics from the University of Cape Town. From 1995 to 1996, he did post-doctoral research through the Global Security Fellows Initiative at the University of Cambridge in the United Kingdom.

== Bibliography ==
- Namibia, the Politics of Continuity and Change. Jonathan Ball Publishing. 1985. ISBN 0-86850-092-5.
