= Francine Muyumba =

Congolese activist and politician

Francine Furaha Muyumba
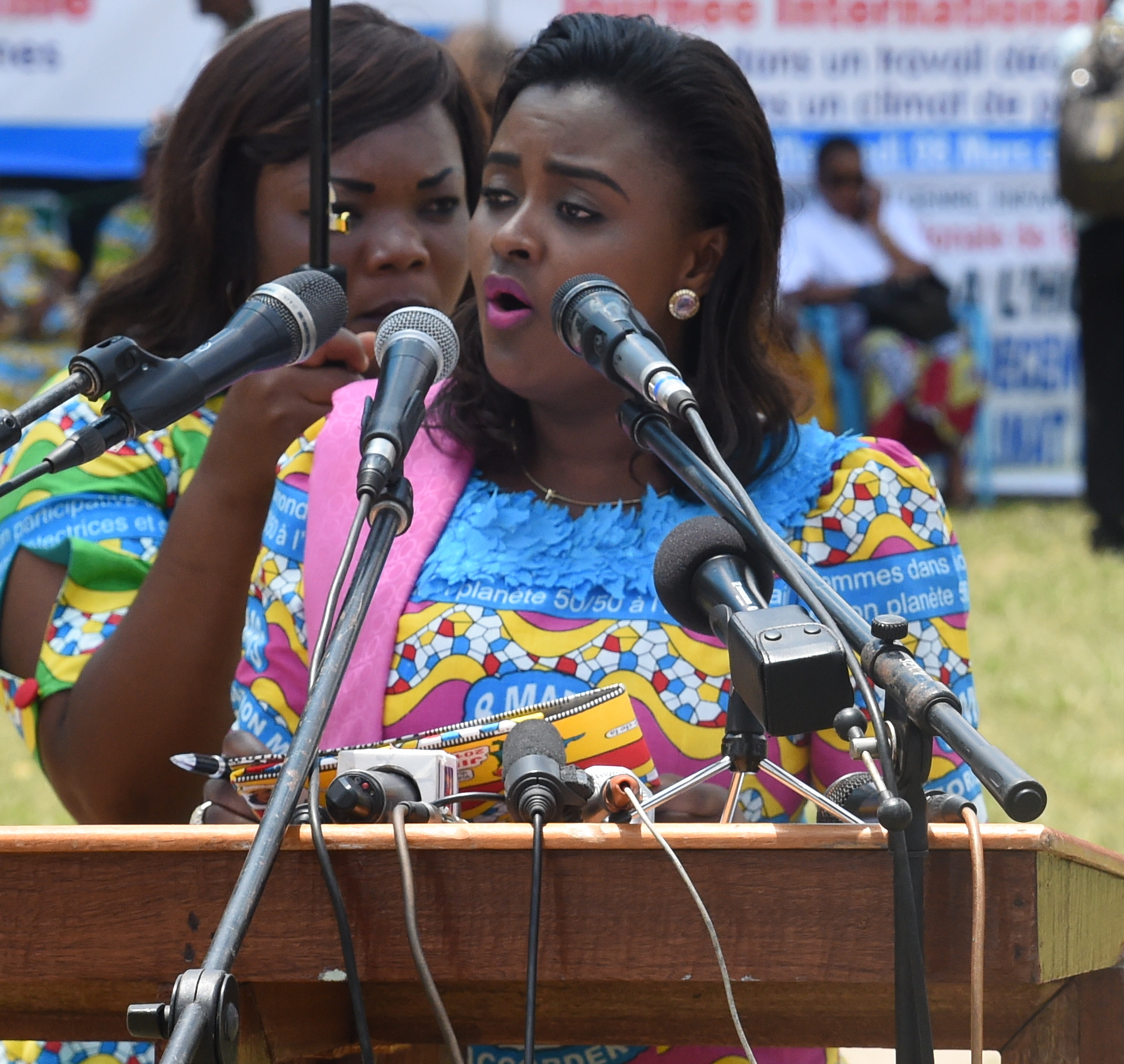
- Portrait of Francine Muyumba

Senator of Haut-Katanga Province
- Incumbent
- Assumed office March 2019

President of Panafrican Youth Union, the official youth body of the African Union
- In office November 2014 – April 2019
- Succeeded by: Juliana Ranavona (Acting)

President of the UNAM SRC
- In office 2010–2011
- Preceded by: William Amutenya
- Succeeded by: Nahas Angula Jr

Personal details
- Born: 18 February 1987 (age 39) Bukavu
- Education: University of Namibia
- Occupation: Political activist, politician
- Website: http://francinemuyumba.com/

Francine Furaha Muyumba (born 18 February 1987) is a Congolese activist and politician serving as Senator in the Senate of Congo. Previously, she served as the president of the Panafrican Youth Union, the official youth body of the African Union from November 2015 to April 2019.

== Early life ==
Muyumba graduated with a Bachelor of Arts honors degree from the University of Namibia in 2011. There she was also active in student government and in her final year she was elected president of the Student Representative Council, the UNAM SRC, becoming the first ever international student to hold the position.

During this time in Namibia, Muyumba served as the acting country coordinator of the United Nations Association. After her studies and tenure as country coordinator, she returned to serve the youth of her native DRC from 2012 to 2014. Based on her experience of youth activism around the world, she is a regular speaker on youth issues, including before the United Nations. She has also served as the president of the Administrative Board of the National Federation of Youth Entrepreneurs of the DRC, country coordinator for the National Youth Forum DRC, and bilingual secretary of the DRC government peace talks with M23 rebels in Kampala, Uganda. She helped to mobilize the youth of the Great Lakes region of Africa to participate in peace and stability forums, and became an advocate for youth rights. This contributed to her becoming the first female president of the Panafrican Youth Union, representing all African youth under the African Union.

== President of the Panafrican Youth Union ==
Muyumba was elected president of the Panafrican Youth Union (PYU) in 2014. The PYU functions as the elected representative body for all African youth (defined as those under 35 years of age)—a demographic that consists of 65 percent of Africa's population. During her tenure as president of the PYU, Muyumba strengthened the relationship with the African Union Commission, in order to bring African youth to the center of decision making; and facilitated intergenerational communication and the inclusion of youth voices in political matters across Africa. She serves as the primary representative of youth issues to the African Union and associated heads of state. Muyumba worked with the African Union chairwoman Nkosazana Dlamini-Zuma to establish continental youth development funds.

She has been a peace advocate both locally and globally. In her role, Francine Muyumba advocates for youth entrepreneurship and youth job creation to support peace and stability on the African continent. She has also advocated on behalf of African youth to UN Secretary General Ban Ki-moon. She is the first Pan African Youth Union president, since the creation of the organization in 1962, to be given an opportunity to speak at the UN General Assembly on behalf of African Youth. She has been working closely with the United Nations Envoy on Youth to voice issues affecting youth around the world.

Also, in her role as president of the PYU, Muyumba has increased collaboration and goal-setting with international bodies and the African Union through her work with African Union Agenda 2063, the African Youth Charter, and the 2030 Sustainable Development Agenda of the United Nations. Muyumba is a frequent presenter in international youth and women's forums; in 2015, Muyumba spoke at the Global Summit of Women in São Paulo, the United Nations General Assembly, the first World Youth Forum on peace and security in Amman, the African Union Heads of State and government summits, and the Millennium Campus Conference at the United Nations. She has also met with the United States Department of State and the World Bank in Washington D.C. in order to strengthen partnerships for African youth development.

On 30 May 2018, Muyumba attended the International Economic Forum in St. Petersburg Russia where she stressed that the need of globalisation and that the World needed Africa as much as Africa needed the world.

On 30 November 2019, she resigned as President of the Panafrican Youth Union to resume her new role in the Congolese senate.

== Political career ==
In March 2019, Muyumba was elected to the Congolese Senate by the provincial assembly of Haut-Katanga. At the age of 32, she was one of the two youngest persons elected to the body.

== Personal life ==
Muyumba lives in Kinshasa, Democratic Republic of Congo. In July 2019, she married long time partner and spokesperson of Congo's former ruling party, Patrick Nkanga, in a traditional wedding in Kinshasa.

== See also ==
- Panafrican Youth Union
- African Union
- UNAM SRC
- Youth Activism
