= John Steytler =

Namibian economist

John Steytler is a Namibian economist. He was the CEO of the Development Bank of Namibia from September 2023 to March 2025. He holds a PhD in economics from the University of KwaZulu-Natal.

Steytler was head of research and chief economist at the Bank of Namibia, and senior economist at the International Monetary Fund. He became the first statistician-general of Namibia when the Namibia Statistics Agency was founded in 2011. He served until 2015 and then became special advisor on economic affairs to president Hage Geingob. Steytler resigned in 2019 and took up a position at Deutsche Gesellschaft für Internationale Zusammenarbeit. In September 2023 Steytler was appointed CEO of the Development Bank of Namibia, succeeding Martin Inkumbi. He resigned from the bank in March 2025.
