= Alfredo Tjiurimo Hengari =

Namibian presidential press secretary

- Born: Alfredo Tjiurimo Hengari; 8 December 1974 (age 51)

Alfredo Tjiurimo Hengari (born 8 December 1974 in Windhoek) is a Namibian who serves as the presidential press secretary to President Hage Geingob.

Hengari schooled at A. Shipena High School in Katutura and enrolled for B.A. in political science and sociology at the University of Namibia and thereafter taught at his former high school before enrolling for master's degree in international studies at the University of Stellenbosch, his Masters thesis at Stellenbosch focused on the regional economic partnership agreements between the European Union and the Southern African Development Community (SADC). While at Stellenbosch, he also served as a tutor in the Department of Political Science.

He served as Prime Minister Hage Geingob's personal assistant and thereafter as coordinator for the Civil Service College project for a few months before he left for France in March 2003. After following intensive French-language courses at the Université de Franche-Comté, he first completed a diploma in French history and civilisation at the Université Paris-Sorbonne IV, before he proceeded to do an M-Phil in international relations at the Université Paris 1 Panthéon-Sorbonne. He completed a PhD in political science at the University of Paris 1 Pantheon-Sorbonne focusing on the transformation of French and British strategies in conflict management in Sub-Saharan Africa. He was a research intern in 2007 at the Department of Peacekeeping Operations at the United Nations in New York as part of his PhD research. Hengari was also a weekly political columnist for Namibia's largest independent English daily, The Namibian. He provides regular commentary for other newspapers in Namibia such New Era on political events and developments.
