= Nico Horn =

Namibian professor and theologian

Johannes Nicolaas Horn is a Namibian Professor of Human rights and Constitutional Law at the University of Namibia (UNAM) since 2002. He holds PhDs in Theology and Law, and was an advocate in the Office of the Prosecutor-General, and Prosecutor in the High Court of Namibia. He worked as UNAM's Director of the Human Rights and Documentation Centre, Dean of the Law Faculty from 2008 until 2010 and also served on the UNAM Governing Council. Nico Horn is the founding editor and a founding trustee of the Namibia Law Journal and chairperson of the Board of Trustees of the SADC Law Journal. He was also a Pastor for the Pentecostal church in South Africa.

Horn is a committee nominee for the United Nations Human Rights Council.

== Education ==
Horn earned a doctorates in theology from the University of Western Cape, a doctor of law from the University of Bremen in Germany, a Master of Arts (cum laude) from University of Port Elizabeth, a Master of Law from the University of South Africa, a Baccalaureus Procurationis (South Africa) from Rand Afrikaans University (now the University of Johannesburg), and a Bachelors in Theology from the University of South Africa (UNISA). He is an admitted legal practitioner of the High Court of Namibia. He worked as a journalist covering stories of student resistance against Apartheid in Soweto, Johannesburg in South Africa.

== Bibliography ==
- Nico Horn is well-published in the fields of Human Rights, International Law, Comparative Constitutional Law, and Pentecostal Theology.
- In 2008, he was co-editor of three books; including works on judicial independence and a commentary on the new Namibian Criminal Procedure Act.
