= Energy 100 FM =

Radio station in Windhoek, Namibia

Windhoek; Namibia
- Broadcast area: Khomas
- Frequency: 100 MHz

Programming
- Language: English

Energy 100 FM is a commercial radio station in Windhoek, Namibia. It is the most tuned-in station in Namibia with an estimated figure of 100,000. The station was founded in 1996 and has a listening frequency across Namibia.

In 2018, Energy became the first station in Namibia to launch video content. In 2017, it partnered with MTC to air the first schools national debate competition on radio.

== Presenters ==
The station has had different presenters. It has produced some of that have won the best Radio Presenters in Namibia.

Presenter	Show
Zinia	Breakfast 100 (Mon–Fri 6:00–9:00) / AM–PM (Sat 10:00–14:00)
Joseph	Onyika (Mon–Fri 10:00–12:00)
Chante	Essential Lounge (Mon–Fri 12:00–15:00) / Connect 100 (Sat 14:00–16:00)
Dazzle	Urban Drive / Power Hour (Mon–Fri 15:00–18:00)
Phillip & Tutu	Sports Cafe (Mon–Fri 18:00–20:00)
Sexy Jimmy	Late Night cruz (Mon–Fri 20:00–24:00) / Saturday Breakfast (6:00–9:00)
Elsabe	News Reader (Mon–Fri 13:00–17:00)

== See also ==
- Telecommunications in Namibia
