= A. Shipena Secondary School =

High school in Windhoek, Namibia

- Katutura, Windhoek, Namibia

Information
- School type: Public School
- Founded: 1985
- Head teacher: Moses Haufiku
- Gender: Co-Educational

A. Shipena Secondary School is a secondary school in Windhoek, the capital of Namibia. It is a government school situated in the Soweto area of the Katutura suburb, offering school grades 8–12. In 2015 it had 1,200 students. The school is named after Ananias Shipena.

== History ==
A. Shipena Secondary School was founded in 1985 with about 700 pupils and 16 teachers. The following year on October 16, 1986, at 04:10 in the early morning the school was hit by a bomb on what was supposed to be the day it held its first prize giving ceremony to reward students who did well academically and in sports. Nobody was injured but the school's administration block was severely damaged, and the event had to be cancelled.

In February 1987, the school received its first computer which was bought and put up for bids by a local radio programme. A. Shipena made the winning bid of N$1900,00 for a computer that cost N$35000,00.

The current principal of the school is Moses Haufiku.
