= Development Bank of Namibia =

Namibian development bank

- Company type: Parastatal
- Industry: Finance
- Founded: 2004
- Headquarters: Windhoek, Namibia
- Key people: John Mbango (Interim CEO)
- Products: Loans; Equity Partnerships; Financial Advisory Services; Management Services; Export/Import Finance
- Revenue: ▲ After tax: US$3.216 million (NAD: 35.3 million) (2011)
- Total assets: US$146.01 million (NAD: 1.602+ billion) (2011)
- Owner: Government of Namibia
- Website: Homepage
- Footnotes / references Headquarters

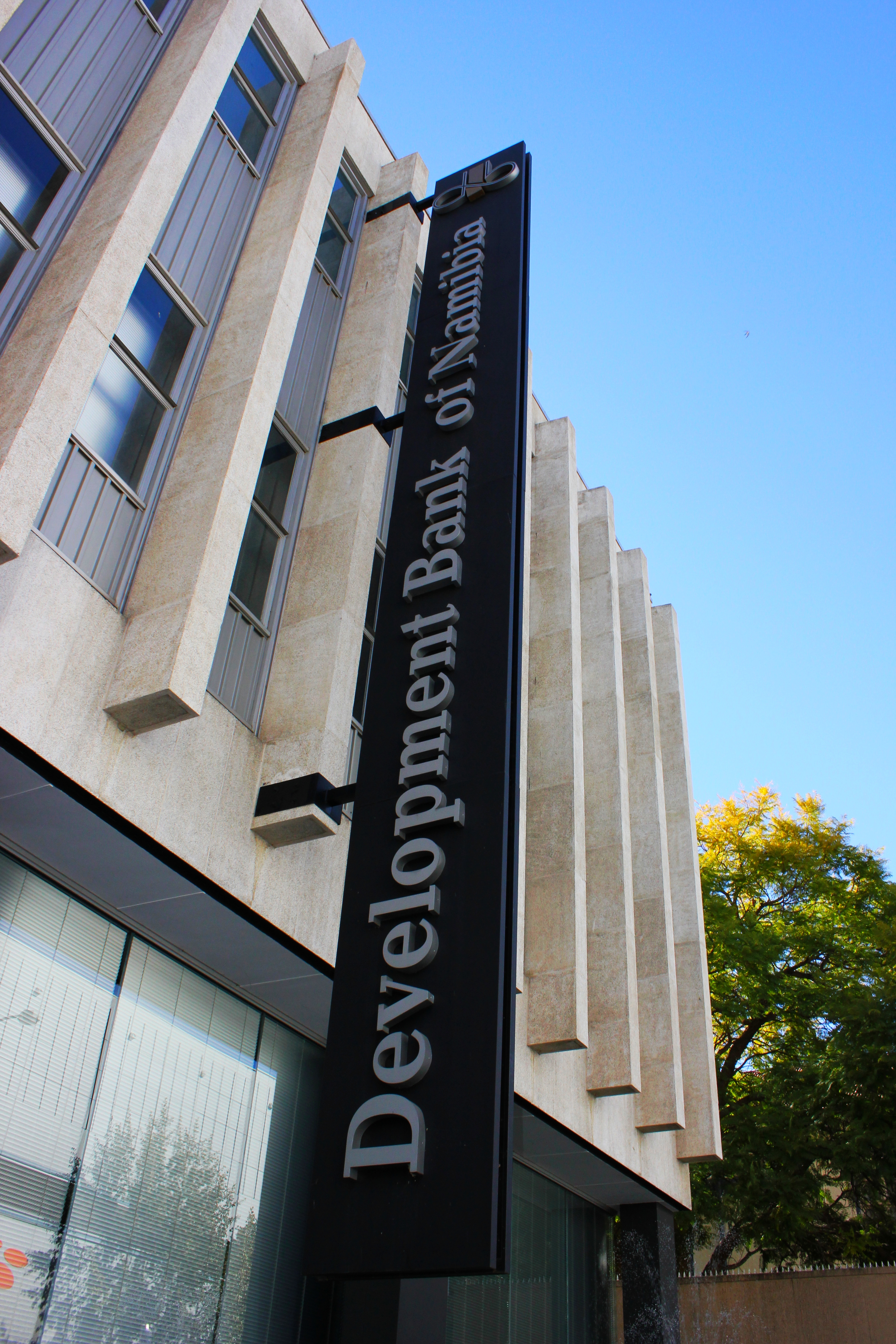
DBN headquarters in Windhoek

The Development Bank of Namibia (DBN) is a state owned development bank in Namibia.

== Overview ==
The bank began its operations in 2004. The main objective of DBN is to promote and finance development in those sectors of the economy which support development and the welfare of the citizens of the country. As of December 2011, the total asset valuation of the bank was in excess of US$146 million (NAD:1.602 billion), with shareholders equity of approximately US$144.3 million (NAD:1.583 billion)

== Leadership ==
The Development Bank of Namibia is led by a chief executive officer who is part of the board of directors. CEOs of the DBN have been:

- Martin Inkumbi (until 2023)
- John Steytler (2023–2025)

With the resignation of John Steytler as CEO in March 2025, John Mbango was appointed interim CEO.

== See also ==
- List of banks in Namibia
- Economy of Namibia
- Government of Namibia
