= Namibia Statistics Agency =

Parastatal in Namibia

- Abbreviation: NSA
- Type: Government Agency
- Headquarters: Windhoek, Namibia
- CEO: Alex Shimuafeni
- Board of directors: John Steytler, Alex Shimuafeni, Liberta Kapere, Nelago Indongo, Salomo Hei
- Subsidiaries: Household Welfare and Labour Statistics, Geospatial Information, National Accounts & Sectoral Statistics, Demographic and Vital Statistics, Field Operations and Regional Affairs
- Website: https://nsa.org.na/

The Namibia Statistics Agency (NSA), formerly the Central Bureau of Statistics (CBS), is the national statistical authority of Namibia. It is an agency of the Namibian government, and headquartered in the capital Windhoek.

== History ==
Before Namibian independence in 1990, there was no stand-alone statistical authority. Statistical data was managed through a department of the South African Statistical Services. After independence, the Central Statistical Office was launched as a division of the National Planning Commission. It was later renamed the Central Bureau of Statistics.

In 2011, the Namibia Statistics Agency was formalised on the basis of the Statistics Act, 20 (Act No 9 of 2011). It started operating in 2012.

== Legal Basis ==
The statistical authority until 2011 operated on the basis of the Statistics Act, No 66 of 1976. A new Statistics Bill was discussed by the National Assembly during 2010 to 2011, including the formation of an entirely independent Namibia Statistics Agency. With the endorsement of the Statistics Act, 2011 (Act No 9 of 2011) this was implemented.

== Mandate and Organisation ==
The main responsibility of NSA are the preparation, publication and dissemination of objective, relevant, comparable, trustworthy, timely and easy to access official statistics in all areas of national interest. In addition, NSA coordinates the creation of official datasets, ensuring compliance with defined quality criteria.

NSA is headed by the statistician-general. The founding statistician general was John Steytler who served from 2012 to January 2015. He was succeeded in April 2016 by Alex Shimuafeni.

== Statistical Information ==
The NSA regularly publishes various statistical datasets and publications.

=== Economic Data ===
In the area of economics, NSA mainly publishes information on agriculture, consumer prices, foreign trade and macroeconomic data.

- National Accounts: quarterly publications as well as summaries spanning across several years (example 2000–2009)
- Annual Agricultural Survey and industrial statistics
- Consumer Price Index (NCPI) and inflation: monthly publication since February 2005, following the Interim Consumer Price Index for Windhoek that existed since January 1993
- Foreign Trade: quarterly publications

=== Demographic and Geospatial Data ===
This department deals with the social structure of Namibia.

- Demography
- Social sciences
- Geographic Information Systems and Cartography

The main surveys include the Namibia Household Income and Expenditure Survey (NHIES) as well as the Namibia Inter-censal Demographic Survey (NIDS) conducted every five years, as well as the National Household Census conducted once in ten years. The first Geographic Information System created under the National Spatial Data Infrastructure (NSDI) policy, is the Bush Information System that provides a national dataset on woody plant encroachment.
