= George Kambala =

Namibian youth activist

Personal details
- Born: 9 May 1992 (age 34) Windhoek, Namibia
- Education: Institute of Information and Technology (IIT)

George Hidipo Hamba Kambala (born 9 May 1992) is a Namibian youth activist who, along with Job Amupanda and Dimbulukeni Nauyoma, co-founded a radical youth movement known as the Affirmative Repositioning in 2014 to advocate for land among Namibian youths. He also served in the SWAPO Youth League before his subsequent expulsion for his involvement in the youth movement.

== Personal life ==
Kambala was born and grew up in Windhoek's Katutura, where he attended Martti Ahtisaari Primary School. He was part of the SWAPO Party Youth League leaders who were suspended and expelled from the party for occupying a plot in an upmarket Windhoek suburb.

His father, Kambala senior, was a driver, while his mother worked as a nurse in Windhoek.

== Affirmative Repositioning Movement ==
In 2014, following reports by The Namibian newspaper that Windhoek Mayor Agnes Kafula allocated a plot to Big Brother Africa winner Kambala, alongside Nauyoma and Amupanda, who occupied land in a Windhoek suburb, raised more concerns about the land question in Namibia, as many do not have access to affordable housing.
