= Students Union of Namibia =

Namibian students organisation

Namibia Students Union
- Formation: 2019
- Founded at: Windhoek
- Headquarters: Windhoek, Namibia
- Region served: Khomas
- President: Simon Amunime
- Vice President: Inna Hengari
- Secretary General: Bernard Kavau

The Students Union of Namibia (SUN) is a students organisation in Namibia. It was formed in 2019 by a break-away faction of the Namibia National Students Organization (NANSO).

In 2019 NANSO members were involved in ideological differences over ways in which Namibian students needed to be represented. They accused the president of NANSO, its secretary general and secretary to the students president as being captured by members of the SWAPO Party Youth League. This preceded a public altercation aired on Namibian Broadcasting Corporation news in April 2019. In it, the president of NANSO was chased out of a meeting by student leaders accusing her of "selling out the struggle to politicians". This infighting at NANSO, until then the only national students' organisation, caused the suspension of some of its leaders and the withdrawal of a number of its members. Vice president of NANSO Bernard Kavau, Khomas regional coordinator Simon Amunime and president of the International University of Management Students' representative council Sheya Epaphras Ngolo were suspended by NANSO. They subsequently resigned altogether and formed the Students Union of Namibia.
