= University of Namibia School of Medicine =

Medical school of the University of Namibia

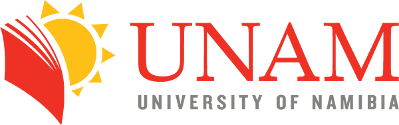
- Type: Public medical school
- Established: 2009
- Parent institution: University of Namibia
- Chancellor: Kenneth Matengu
- Dean: Felicia Christians
- Location: Windhoek, Namibia
- Website: www.unam.edu.na/school-of-medicine

University of Namibia School of Medicine (also known as UNAM School of Medicine) is the medical school of University of Namibia. It was established in 2009 and graduated its first Namibian trained medical doctors in 2016.

The campus is located at the university's Hage Geingob Campus in Windhoek North close to the Windhoek Central Hospital where students do their referrals. It is the first and only medical school in Namibia.

== Academic programmes ==
The School of Medicine is accompanied by the School of Pharmacy, the School of Public Health and the newly added School of Dentistry. The university offers both undergraduate and postgraduate degrees.

=== Undergraduate ===
- Bachelors of Medicine and Surgery (MBChB)
- Bachelors of Pharmacy Honours (BPharm)
- Bachelor of Dental Surgery (BChD)
- Bachelor of Physiotherapy
- Bachelor of Occupational Therapy

=== Postgraduate ===
- Master of Pharmacy
