= The Perivoli Foundation =

- Formation: 2022/04/09
- Purpose: To transform Sub-Saharan Africa through scalable, science-based interventions in early childhood education and sustainable agriculture.
- Headquarters: United Kingdom
- Founder: James Alexandroff OBE
- Website: https://perivolifoundation.com/

The Perivoli Foundation is a UK-registered charitable foundation established in 2020. It supports programs in early-years education in sub-Saharan Africa and environmental initiatives focused on rangeland restoration and climate research.

== Programmes & Focus Areas ==
The Foundation conducts grant-making and supportive initiatives across several fields.

Early Years Education

The Perivoli Schools Trust focuses on supporting nursery education in Sub-Saharan Africa by training pre-school teachers using low-cost, recyclable materials. The programme has been featured by Africa.com and other outlets describing its scale and training model.

Environmental Projects

The Perivoli Rangeland Institute, headquartered in Namibia, supports research and pilot projects on restoring bush-encroached rangeland, training farmers, and assessing implications for soil organic carbon and biodiversity. PRI's work has been reported in Namibian media and referenced in technical studies commissioned by development agencies.

Academic Research

The Perivoli Africa Research Centre (PARC) at the University of Bristol was established in 2019, and funded by the foundation, it aims to build more balanced research partnerships between universities in the UK and Africa.

Entrepreneurship Support

Perivoli Innovations invests in early-stage businesses, with a focus on addressing climate change, health, social inclusion and productivity enhancement. Profits from these positive impact investments go to the Perivoli Foundation.

== History ==
James Alexandroff OBE created The Perivoli Foundation in 2020. It is predominantly funded by The Perivoli Trust, created in 2000 when Alexandroff gifted it his ownership of Arisaig Partners, an emerging market fund management company he co-founded in Singapore four years earlier. Alexandroff received The University of Bristol Award for Transformative Philanthropy in 2022 and was awarded an OBE for his work on education in Africa in 2023.

== Governance ==
The Perivoli Foundation trustees are James Alexandroff, Hugh Grootenhuis and Barry McCorkell.
