= Inna Hengari =

Namibian politician (born 1996)

Inna Koviao Hengari

Member of National Assembly
- Incumbent
- Assumed office 20 March 2020
- President: Hage Geingob

Personal details
- Born: 2 February 1996 (age 30) Namibia
- Education: University of Namibia

Inna Koviao Vetarera Hengari (born 2 February 1996) is a Namibian politician, student leader and youth activist. A member of the Popular Democratic Movement, she became a member of the National Assembly on 20 March 2020, the youngest since McHenry Venaani in 2004. Previously she served as Vice President of the UNAM SRC and the Students Union of Namibia.

== Early life and student activism ==
Hengari was born in 1996 in central Namibia. Raised by a single parent, she attended primary in Okahandja and high school in Otjiwarongo. In 2015, she joined the University of Namibia where she read Political Science. While at the university, she began writing political columns and reviews alongside Joseph Kalimbwe in the Namibian Sun's 'Astute Conversation' initiated by their lecturer Job Amupanda. In 2016, she become politically active in student politics at the University, becoming elected in student issues as Housing Committee Member before being elected as Vice President of the UNAM SRC. In 2018, Hengari joined the Students Union of Namibia where she was later appointed as Deputy president. She has credited McHenry Venaani and Amupanda as her forthright mentors.

== Politics ==
After graduating the University of Namibia in 2019, Hengari joined the Popular Democratic Movement as it parliamentary researcher. That same year, she was put on the party's parliamentary list and was later elected to parliament after the party won 16 seats in the 7th Parliament.

Hengari was elected to the Global Young MP Initiative Steering Committee (2026-2028) as a representative for Southern and Eastern Africa.

== Personal life ==
Hengari graduated in 2019 with UNAM where she was doing political science, Hengari was raised by a single parent who passed on suddenly just a few months before her election to Parliament.
