= Utaara Mootu =

Namibian politician

Member of National Assembly
- Incumbent
- Assumed office 20 March 2020
- President: Hage Geingob

Personal details
- Born: 19 January 1996 (age 30) Namibia
- Education: University of Namibia

Utaara Mootu is a Namibian politician, youth leader and activist. She is an elected member of the Parliament of Namibia following the 2019 elections, representing the Landless People's Movement (Namibia) and serves as the party's parliamentary spokesperson.

== Early life ==
Utaara was born in Windhoek on 19 January 1996. She began her education in 2002 at Van Rhyn Primary school in Windhoek, and then Concordia Secondary School. She then furthered her studies in Business Administration (Diploma) at the University of Namibia and continued to a Bachelor's (Honours) in Public Management majoring in Political Science and International Relations. While at the university, she obtained the best 4th year award in her Department of Political Studies and Administration in 2019.

== Activism and politics ==
Utaara served as a member in the Learners Representative Council in 2013 and joined various charity programs in church as a child. She also took part in the 2013 high schools battle competition where she took first place in the female's category. In 2016 she became Vice President of Aesthetics a performing arts society in university. She later joined student activism and feminist groups in 2017 through protests and poetry. In late 2017 she joined the Landless People's Movement (Namibia) spearheaded by Bernadus Swartbooi and Henny Seibeb and become an active activist joining the struggle of the people of Venezuela, genocide and a staunch advocate for land justice.

She became a founding member of the Landless People's Movement transition to a political on 8 February 2019. In 2018 she served as the interim National Spokesperson for LPM being the youngest spokesperson and executive member of a political party after Independence at the age of 22. During the people's assembly in October 2018 she was elected as the official spokesperson of the party and was elected as the 4th candidate on the party's parliamentary list.

A member of the Pan African Reinasance Country Chapters and Konrad-Adenauer-Stiftung Talent Empowerment Program, she was sworn in as one of the youngest members of the 7th Parliament of Namibia at the age of 24 on 20 March 2020.

== Contribution ==
Mootu at the Namibia MPs dub genocide deal with the Germany apartheid meeting of signing the deal with German, Mootu was not willing to be part of the signatory committee as she told the prime minister that they betrayed them, she emphasized on the equal participation based on human rights policies and a chance to speak one's-mind out about the economic trauma caused by genocide. Mootu was not happy about the age limitation set by the ministry of education of Namibia that 21 year old learners that completed their NSSC and SSOC through NAMCOL will not be allowed to attend the full-time classes anymore. Mootu opposed it as the Ministry of Education is promoting in-equality in the education system and goes against the freedom of education regardless of the age because education is the strong tool to fight poverty.
