= Herero Mall =

Informal business area in Windhoek, Namibia

Coordinates: 22.5255°S 17.0514°E

Herero Mall is an informal business area in the Katutura suburb of Windhoek, the capital of Namibia. It is situated in Clemens Kapuuo Street and was established in 2003. The area was initially used by the Paramount chief of the Herero as a meeting venue. Over the years small businesses started trading there, ranging from shebeens to car wash businesses.

The Herero Mall has been under a lot of controversy, since it is both a security and a health hazard. There are no toilet facilities, and the area is zoned for institutional purposes, but not for business. Technically, all traders who run businesses there are currently doing so illegally.
