= Namibia National Students Organisation =

Namibian students organisation

- Abbreviation: NANSO
- Formation: June 2, 1984; 42 years ago
- Founded at: Windhoek
- Type: Student Movement
- Headquarters: Windhoek, Namibia
- Services: Representing Namibian students
- President: Dorthea Nangolo
- Vice President: Philipus Hamunyela
- Secretary General: Secilia Ambunda
- Website: nanso.org

The Namibia National Students Organisation (NANSO) is a national student organisation in Namibia. It was founded on 2 June 1984 in Döbra, about 25 kilometres (16 mi) north of the capital Windhoek. NANSO is a member of the All-Africa Students Union.

== Student Representation ==
NANSO has been representing Namibian students nationally since its inception in 1984. In 2016, NANSO organised protests by Namibian students to demand withdrawal of registration fees at the country's two major universities.

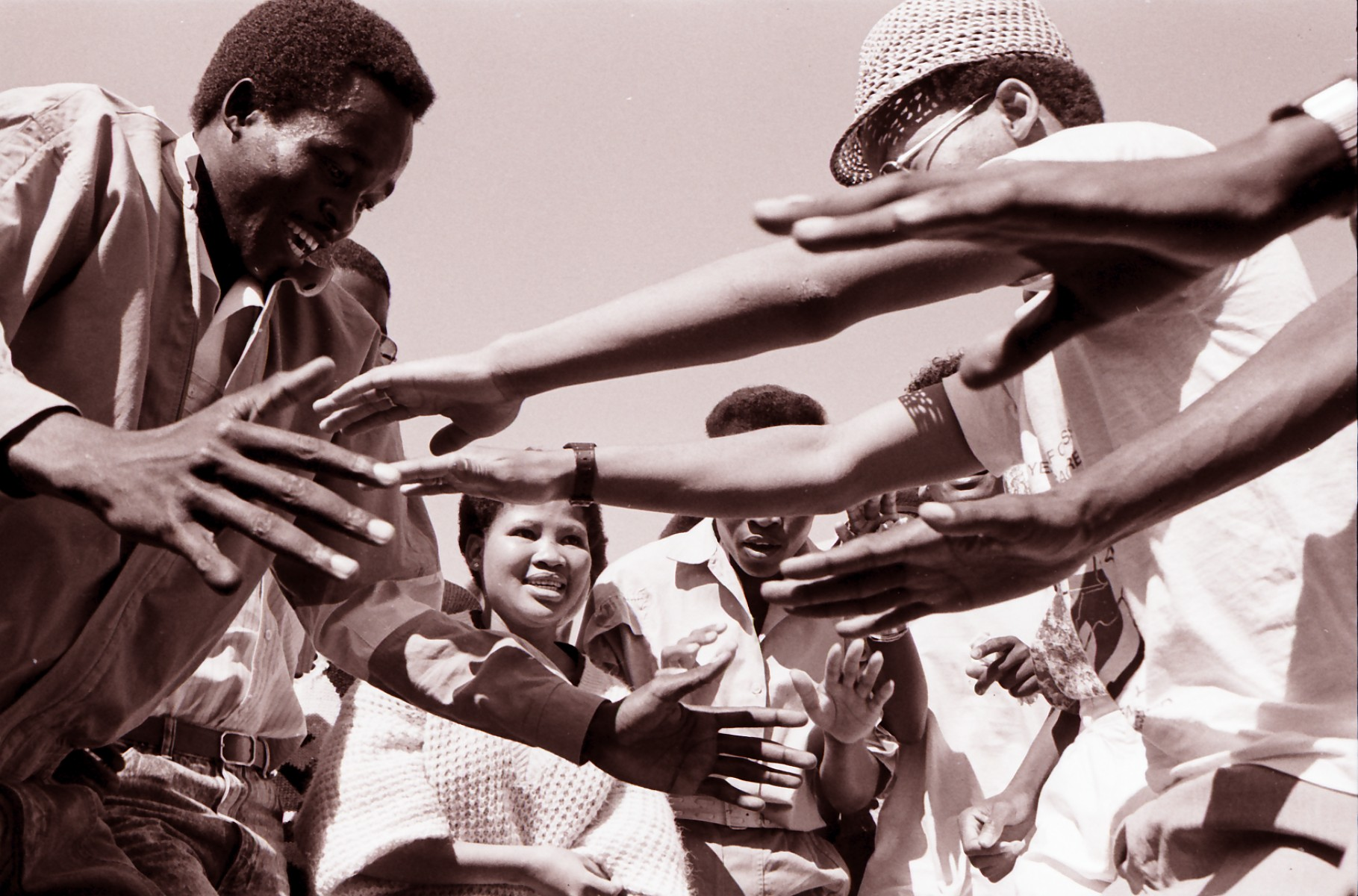
NANSO students sing protest songs in 1988

== Notable former leaders ==
Name	Position Held
Ester Simon - Former President ( First Female President of NANSO)	President 2017 - 2019
Wilhelem Wilhelem	President 2015 - 2017
Stanley Kavetu - Admitted high Court of Namibia legal practitioner	Vice President 2015 - 2017
Dimbulukeni Nauyoma - Co-Founder of the Affirmative Repositioning	Secretary General 2015 - 2017
Herman Walter Rutz	Secretary for Secondary and Basic Education 2013-2015 Secretary for Finance 2015-2017
Vincent Shimwitwikeni- Namibian academic	Spokesperson
Helao Ndjaba	Former Leader
Sharonice Busch	Secretary General 2013 - 2015
Peya Mushelenga - current Namibian cabinet minister	Secretary General
Bernadus Swartbooi leader of the Landless People's Movement	Former Leader
Pohamba Shifeta - Current Namibian minister	Former Leader
Joseph Diescho - Namibian Professor	Former Leader
Elia Kaulifewangali Irimari - Regional Governor of the Oshana Region	Former leader

== Notable members ==
- Fransina Kahungu

== See also ==
- Students Politics in Namibia
- UNAM SRC
- NUST SRC
- NSFAF
- Students Union of Namibia
