= Katutura =

- Location within Namibia
- Coordinates: 22°31′23″S 17°3′37″E
- Country: Namibia
- Time zone: UTC+2 (South African Standard Time)

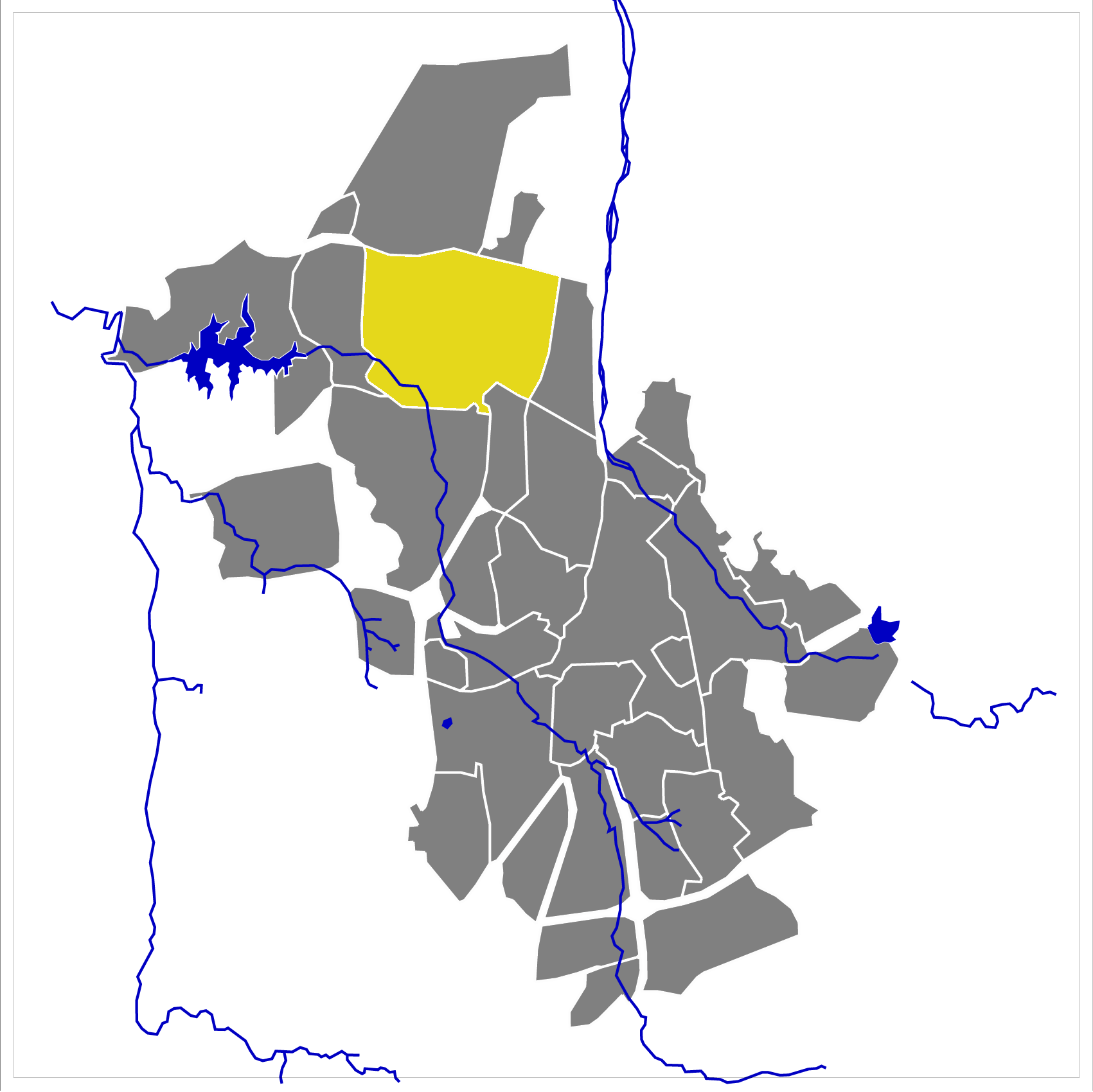
Katutura within Windhoek

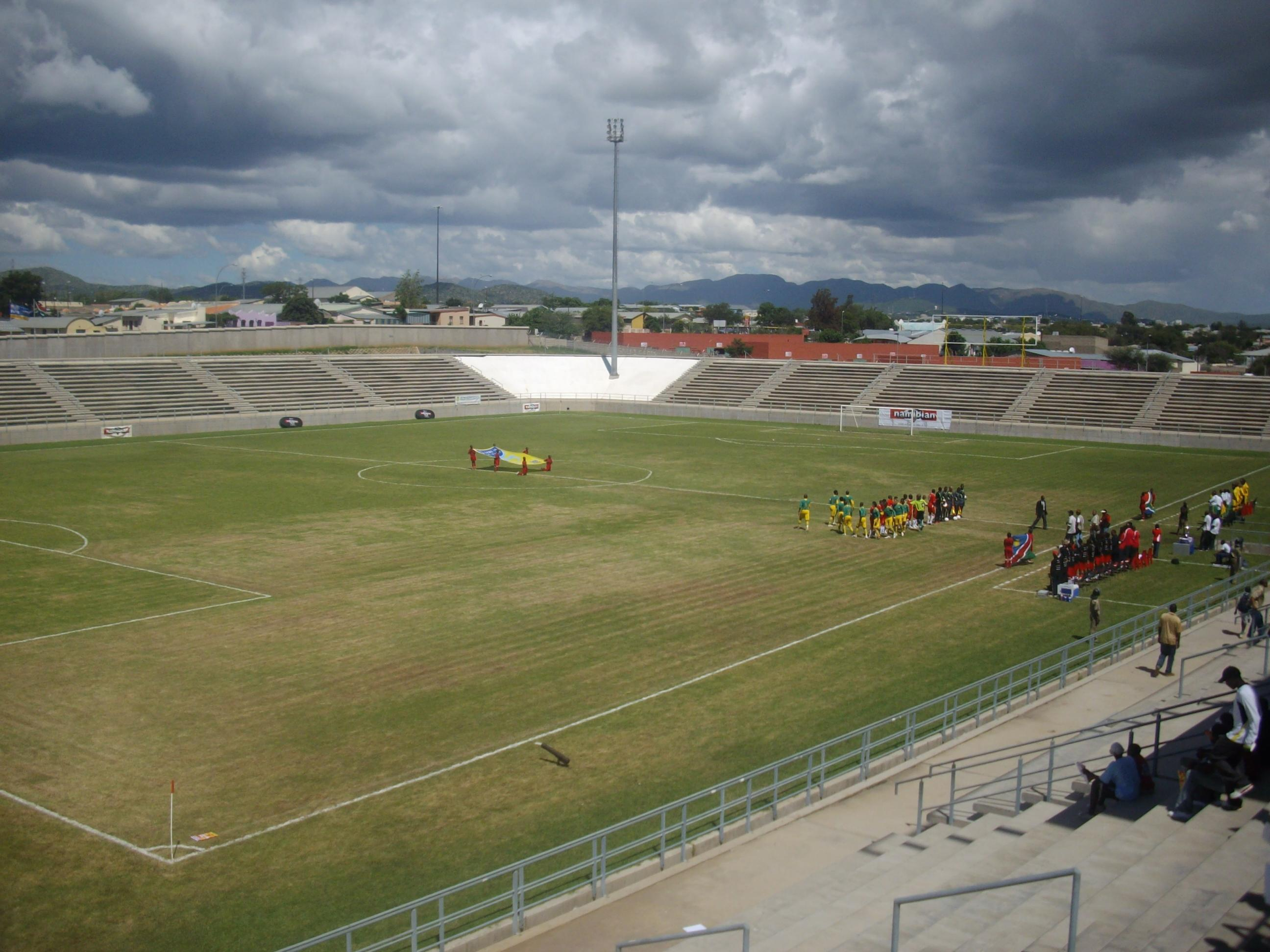
Sam Nujoma Stadium in Katutura

Katutura (Otjiherero for We do not settle) is a township of Windhoek, Khomas Region, Namibia. Katutura was created in 1961 following the forced removal of Windhoek's black population from the Old Location, which afterwards was developed into the suburb of Hochland Park. Sam Nujoma Stadium, built in 2005, is located within Katutura. Katutura Community Radio, a community-based radio station, also operates from the township. Katutura State Hospital, one of two state hospitals in the Windhoek area, is located in the township.

== History ==
During the 1950s, the Windhoek municipality and the South African colonial administration decided to forcefully move the residents of the Old Location 8 kilometres (5.0 mi) to the north of the city, prompting the evicted people to give the new location the name Katutura, which means "The place where people do not want to live" in Herero.

For a number of reasons most residents did not want to move: They had owned the erven in Old Location whereas in Katutura all land belonged to the municipality. The newly allocated erven were also a lot smaller than those in Old Location, effectively forbidding the creation of gardens. Also, economically, black residents were worse off after the move because they now had to pay rent to the municipality and they needed a bus to reach their work places in town—Old Location had been in walking distance.

Following protests and an effective boycott of municipal services by Main Location residents, the police opened fire on the protesters on 10 December 1959, killing 11 and wounding 44 others. This event is known as the Old Location uprising, it is the reason for the declaration of December 10, Human Rights Day, as a Namibian national holiday.

The transfer to the new suburb took several years. In 1962, approximately 7,000 people had been moved, joining the 2,000 people of Ovambo descent that already lived there. All in all, half of the indigenous population of Windhoek lived in Katutura at that time. The breakdown of residents of different tribes in 1962 was:

- Ovambo people: almost 3,000
- Damara people: 2,366
- Coloured people: 1,257
- Nama people: 614
- Herero people: 468
- Ovambanderu people: 71
- Others / undetermined: 1,094

During 2019,a campaign by Hendrich Amutenya and fellow activists to rename Katutura was launched. Amutenya argued that the name of the Katutura township has a bad connotation and reflects poorly towards a now free and independent Namibia. The name "Ubuntura", a portmanteau of ubuntu and Katutura, was suggested.

== Constituencies ==
The political constituencies located within Katutura are:

- Katutura East
- Katutura Central
- John Pandeni Constituency
- Moses //Garoeb
- Samora Machel
- Tobias Hainyeko

== Notable residents ==
- Alfredo Tjiurimo Hengari attended school in Katutura.
- George Kambala - was born in Katutura
- Dimbulukeni Nauyoma - was raised in Katutura.

== See also ==
- Khomasdal, a township of Windhoek for Coloured Namibians
- Katutura Community Radio
- Herero Mall, an informal shopping area in Katutura
- Katutura state hospital
