= Sam Nujoma Jr. =

Namibian politician (born 1991)

Sam Nujoma

Governor of Khomas Region
- Incumbent
- Assumed office 28 March 2025
- President: Netumbo Nandi-Ndaitwah
- Preceded by: Laura McLeod-Katjirua

Personal details
- Born: Sam Shafiishuna Nujoma; October 1991 (age 34–35) Windhoek, Namibia
- Party: SWAPO Party of Namibia
- Parent(s): Utoni Nujoma (father)
- Occupation: Politician

Sam Shafiishuna Nujoma Jr. (born October 1991) is a Namibian politician currently serving as governor of Khomas Region. He is the grandson of Namibia's founding president, Sam Nujoma, who served as president from 1990 to 2005.

== Political career ==
Nujoma's political career began in 2010 when he joined the SWAPO Party Youth League and became a section chairman in its grassroots structures. He later rose through the ranks and became a member of SPYL's Central Committee, where he serves as secretary of the Khomas Region. He is also a member of the SWAPO Party Khomas Regional Executive Committee.

In December 2020, Nujoma became a member of the Windhoek Municipal Council. He was elected in February 2023 to serve as the chairman of the Windhoek council's management committee, which is the Municipal Council's second-highest decision-making body. He served as the chairman of the council advisory committee on financial sustainability, performance management, and policy. He also was a member of the Association of Local Authorities of Namibia, and was chairperson of its finance committee.

On 28 March 2025 Nujoma was appointed by president Netumbo Nandi-Ndaitwah as governor of Khomas Region.
