= UNAM Radio =

Coordinates: 22°36′40″S 17°03′27″E

Windhoek; Namibia
- Frequency: 97.4 MHz

Ownership
- Owner: University of Namibia

History
- First air date: 2000

UNAM Radio is the radio station of the University of Namibia. It broadcasts on 97.4 FM and is based in Windhoek, Namibia.

Established in 2000, UNAM Radio is part of the University of Namibia mission to increase students' practical involvement with media and also to highlight the university's activities to the wider community.

The radio station is mainly dedicated to the university students and also the young at heart. University students are updated on what is happening on campus. The station also introduces topics that affect the lives of the campus students daily. They can give their views and opinions on the topic, usually by text messages. The radio station dedicates most of its time to playing local music and the latest international music.
