= Kenneth Matengu =

Namibian academic (born 1978)

Kenneth Kamwi Matengu
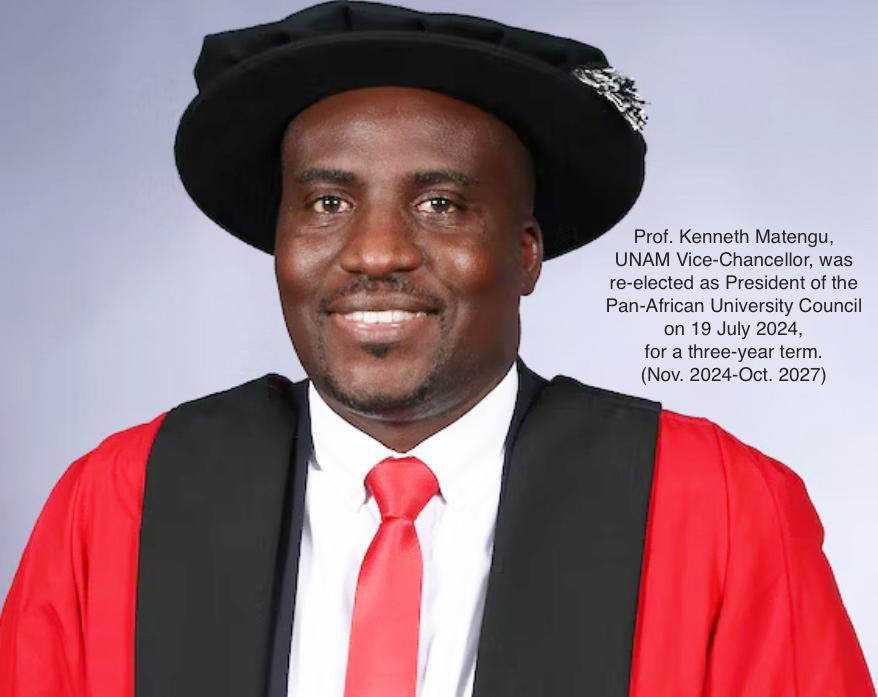

Vice Chancellor of the University of Namibia
- Incumbent
- Assumed office 1 August 2018
- Chancellor: Nangolo Mbumba
- Preceded by: Lazarus Hangula

Personal details
- Born: 1978 (age 47–48) Katima Mulilo, Namibia
- Education: University of Namibia, University of Tampere University of Eastern Finland
- Profession: Professor

Kenneth Kamwi Matengu (born 1978 in Katima Mulilo, Namibia) is a Namibian professor and vice-chancellor of the University of Namibia since August 2018.

== Education ==
Matengu did his high school at Caprivi Senior Secondary School in Katima Mulilo. He holds a certificate in international relations from the University of Tampere, a bachelor's degree in geography and sociology from the University of Namibia, and a Doctor of Philosophy (exemia cum laude) in innovation diffusion and development from the University of Eastern Finland.

== Academic career ==
Matengu was hired as research intern in 1996 while studying at the University of Namibia. He worked in various positions at his alma mater and was appointed Pro-Vice Chancellor for Research, Innovation and Resources Mobilization at the University of Namibia in 2016. On 29 June 2018, Matengu was appointed as the third vice-chancellor of the University of Namibia, replacing Lazarus Hangula.

He is also president of the governing board of the Association of African Universities (AAU), president of the council of the Pan-African University (PAU), and council member of The Association of Commonwealth Universities.
