= NSFAF =

Namibian student fund

Namibia Student Financial Assistance Fund (NSFAF) is a financial organisation in Namibia. It provides bursaries and loans for undergraduate students to help pay for the cost of their tertiary education. It was formed in 1995 and is run by the government under the Ministry of Higher Education, Training and Innovation.

It helps give financial loans to students from the University of Namibia, Namibia University of Science and Technology and International University of Management.

The Namibian government through the treasury releases funds to NSFAF every year to help finance its operations. In 2015, the student fund was given N$700 million. However, there have been in the past instances of the funds not accounting to the money given to it.
