= Erf (law) =

Afrikaans legal term

In property and real estate, an erf (pl. erven) is the legal term used in Namibia, South Africa and Eswatini to describe a piece of land registered in a deeds registry as an erf, lot, plot or stand. The term is derived from the Afrikaans word for "inheritance" or "piece of land".

Section 102 of the South African Deeds Registries Act, 1937 provides the following definition:

"erf" means every piece of land registered as an erf, lot, plot or stand in a deeds registry, and includes every defined portion, not intended to be a public place, of a piece of land laid out as a township, whether or not it has been formally recognized, approved or proclaimed as such.

Section 1 of the Namibian Deeds Registries Act, 2015 (Act No. 14 of 2015) gives an identical definition.

== See also ==
- South African property law
- Township (South Africa)
