= Joseph Kalimbwe =

Zambian politician

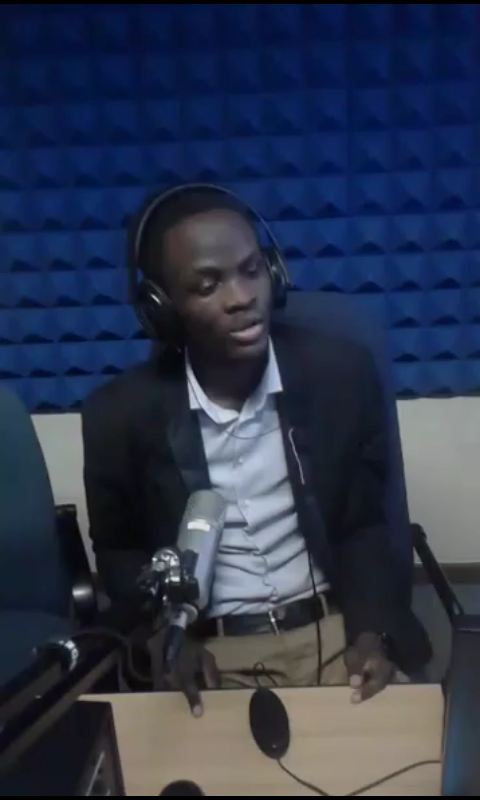
- Kalimbwe speaking at an event in Lilongwe, Malawi in 2021
- Born: 25 March 1993 (age 33); Mangamu Saw Mills, Sesheke
- Education: Political Science
- Alma mater: University of Namibia
- Occupations: Politician activist
- Years active: 2016–present
- Known for: Politics

Joseph Kalimbwe (born 25 March 1993) is a Zambian politician, author and activist. Previously, he was president of the African Union youth simulation in 2014 and president of the student representative council of the University of Namibia in 2017. He has written for the Namibian Sun, and has published three books including Persecuted in Search of Change in 2017, The Pain of An Empty Stomach in 2015 and Teenage-Hood & the Impact of the Western World in 2014.

== Early life ==
Kalimbwe was born on 25 March 1993 at Yeta Hospital in Sesheke, Zambia. His mother was Florence Lubinda, a primary school teacher. She was born and raised in northern Namibia at Katima Mulilo where her father worked as a social worker before moving to Zambia. Kalimbwe's father was Donald Kalimbwe who worked between Rundu and Livingstone. His father died when he was 2 years old, and his mother died of cancer when he turned 11.

He attended Primary School 6 kilometers outside the Sesheke District CBD at Mangamu Saw Mills from 1999 to 2005, from grade 1 to 7. He then attended Loanja Primary School where his mother had been transferred for 5 months before her death. After his mother's death in 2005, Kalimbwe moved to live in with his uncle in Ndola and attended Northrise Basic School and later Chifubu High. After high school, he attended the University of Namibia in Windhoek where he read political science. He obtained an honors degree in political science at the university.

Writing in Persecuted in Search of Change he explains how he "wanted to change my surname". He writes to his late mother on the book's first page of how he is, "constantly thinking of changing my surname to yours as i see no reason of carrying a name of the man i never known and whose family I never met", in reference to his father who died when he was 2. He has also expressed his admiration to Solomon Mahlangu, John Lewis, Kenneth Kaunda, Sam Nujoma and Nelson Mandela's need to change the world from its evils telling her "while I am very proud of the teachings you gave me, I am also very mindful of my own failings & hopes to find meaning in the world". In his publication with the Namibian Sun, he pointed Africa's inability to resolve poverty as a continent still "struggling to find its place in the world" saying:

'Our continent has struggled to live to up the promise of a better life for everyone who live under its roof. And all the way up to the time South Sudan recently became the 54th African country on the continent in 2011, we seem to have had our glory days behind us, 17 years into this new century.'.

— Joseph Kalimbwe, 2017 (extracted from the New Era (Namibia).

== Writing career ==
While he served as editor of a weekly political column in the Namibian Sun, Kalimbwe began writing his first book and publish political reviews in the paper. In 2018, he began writing his fourth book, A Fractured World: How irresponsibility led to 3rd World Economic Downturns aided by former Goldman Sachs and World Bank executive Dambisa Moyo on the World's Economy following the 2008 financial crisis. His publications include:

=== Books ===
- Teenage-Hood & the impact of the West – 2015
- The Pain of An Empty Stomach – 2016
- Persecuted in Search of Change – 2017

== Youth participation ==
Kalimbwe has participated in African youth activism and was elected student representative council president of the University of Namibia. He was expelled from his Master's programme at the university in 2017 after breaking into a cafeteria with other students to use it as a study area, claiming that there were not enough designated study spaces. He also took part in the FeesMustFall protests in which university students demanded a decrease in university fees. He was later arrested as a result of this campaigning.

According to The Namibian, the student protests in Namibia are happening "against the backdrop of the Affirmative Repositioning youth movement occupying urban land, and the Landless People's Movement reclaiming ancestral land in Namibia; 'Rhodes Must Fall' and 'Fees Must Fall' protests by South African students in their quest to decolonise their universities.

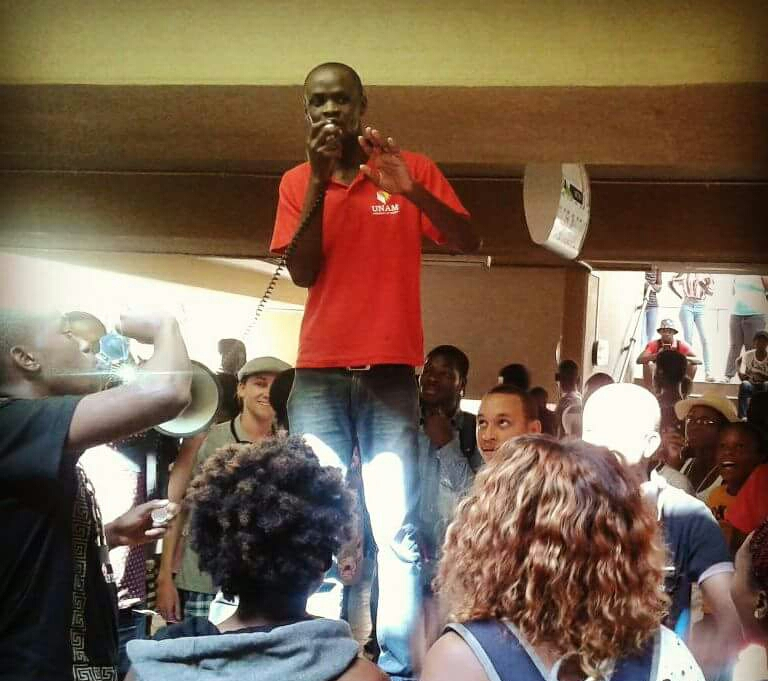
Kalimbwe addressing youths during a gathering at University of Namibia in 2017

During the #FeesMustFall movements in South Africa, Kalimbwe was advocating for Namibian government to scrape fees for poor students. He later was arrested in 2017 after a protest in Windhoek. His trial was postponed several times. At his 10th appearance on 30 November 2018, the state found that the trial could not continue as there was no evidence and lack of state witnesses with the state advocating for the case's removal from court roll. Later that evening, New Era (Namibia) reported that the state had lost the case against Kalimbwe whose lawyers had promised legal action against the "unfair treatment" of their client.

== Controversies ==
In May 2017, Kalimbwe and three other members of the UNAM SRC organised a protest for increased study areas, a decrease in tuition fees, and against alleged senior staff corruption at the University of Namibia. A month before, Kalimbwe and members of the student's union had claimed they had been provided with inside information of how senior staff members in the university's IT department, had allegedly taken N$1.3 million meant for a student system upgrade. The staff member, in emails leaked to The Namibian newspaper, later threatened to prevent the alleged claims by hunting down the student leaders and university employees who provided Kalimbwe with such information.

Two days after the protests, the Namibia police were called, and the four student leaders were suspended and expelled for leading the protests. Kalimbwe was later charged with fraud after the university alleged that he had failed to register for his master's degree programme. This increased Kalimbwe's prominence among Namibian students as student protests began in Windhoek after his followers demanded for his immediate reinstatement. Kalimbwe stated he was being removed because he refused to be used for political reasons. His third book, Persecuted in Search of Change, narrates his version of the events.

Kalimbwe has been a critic of most Southern African Liberation Movements, including Zimbabwean leader, Emmerson Mnangagwa whom he accused of not helping SADC resolve issues in DRC during his SADC Chairmanship tenure. Kalimbwe and former Zambian Deputy Nevers Mumba received backlash in Zimbabwe for their statements on the SADC Chairman and 2023 Zimbabwean elections. It was reported in Zambian Media that Mumba got state protection at his private home following the Zimbabwean elections incident in which they were accused of supporting the opposition in a neighbouring country.

== Politics ==
Kalimbwe joined the United Party for National Development in 2012 after high school in his hometown of Ndola. He then went to university in Namibia to study political science. He rose to attention in 2019 calling for the removal of President Edgar Lungu and asking for his replacement with his party president Hakainde Hichilema whom he helped mobilize youth support to win the 2021 election as one of the Information and Publicity Secretary in the party in rural Zambia. At the time, he claimed on local told station, Diamond Live that President Lungu and his colleagues had destroyed the "moral fibre of our politics and reduced our people into complete electoral beggers who are given money in anticipation of votes".

In August 2021, Kalimbwe told CNN and Germany TV station DW that the youth vote was central to his party's victory as "18 – 34 year olds lined up to go correct the mistakes of their parents". During the interview with DW, he stated that it was unfortunate to see "our country being ransacked by one man and his colleagues these past 7 years", in direct reference to former President Edgar Lungu.

Between 2023 and 2024, Kalimbwe was nominated to be Zambian Pan African Parliament Campaign spokesperson at the Pan African Parliament where Zambia had fielded Miles Sampa as candidate against Fortune Charumbira of Zimbabwe. In the lead up to the vote, the Zimbabwean delegation accused the Zambians of trying to cause division by fielding a candidate when Southern Africa already had a candidate. Zambia denied this and the election went on 25 March 2024, with Zimbabwean candidate winning by one vote more against Sampa of Zambia. Zambia is represented by 2 UPND MPs, One Independent MP and 2 Patriotic Front MPs.

== African youth influence ==
Following his role in the election of the United Party for National Development against the ruling Patriotic front, Kalimbwe gained popularity across Africa outside his native Zambia, especially in Zimbabwe, Tanzania, Namibia and Uganda as young Africans called for the removal or oppressive ruling parties from power. In a series of tweets after the election of Hakainde Hichilema, he called on African youths to be brave if they wanted to vote out dictators saying, "Go and vote out in your masses and then protect the vote from being rigged".

A day later he posted on twitter a photo of himself with Zimbabwean opposition leader Nelson Chamisa saying "Zambia is a democracy, we welcome and debate with anyone here". After the incident, Kalimbwe was criticized on social media for taking photos with opposition political leaders from Africa after he again published photos with former Zimbabwean Finance Minister Tendai Biti, Zitto Kabwe of Tanzania and Chamisa with others claiming he was now in the ruling party and was not supposed to take photos with those in the opposition. He however rubbished the criticism claiming he will "always stand with those who supported our struggle in the opposition.

== Issues with liberation movements ==
Kalimbwe, has been a strong supporter of Hichilema, when former Zimbabwean Finance Minister, Patrick Chinamasa, threatened the Zambian President in a 2023 tweet that he would follow Mwanawasa's fate after Hichilema had deployed Nevers Mumba to the Zimbabwean Election monitoring SADC team.

Since then, Kalimbwe has been very critical of Liberation Movements in Southern Africa. It earned him a popular statue for his stance on Zimbabwe's Zanu PF and the ANC of South Africa. This followed Kalimbwe having had a dispute with Zimbabwe's former finance minister Patrick Chinamasa and the spokesperson of Zimbabwean President George Charamba who claimed Kalimbwe was still a baby in politics after Kalimbwe asked the later to explain his position on the death of 3rd President of Zambia, Patrick Mwanawasa.

In 2023, the Secretary General of the ANC, Fikile Mbalula stated that Kalimbwe needed to learn a lot of things in politics after Mbalula posted a twitter photo accusing Zambian President Hichilema of being a puppet of the West.

== Journal commentaries ==
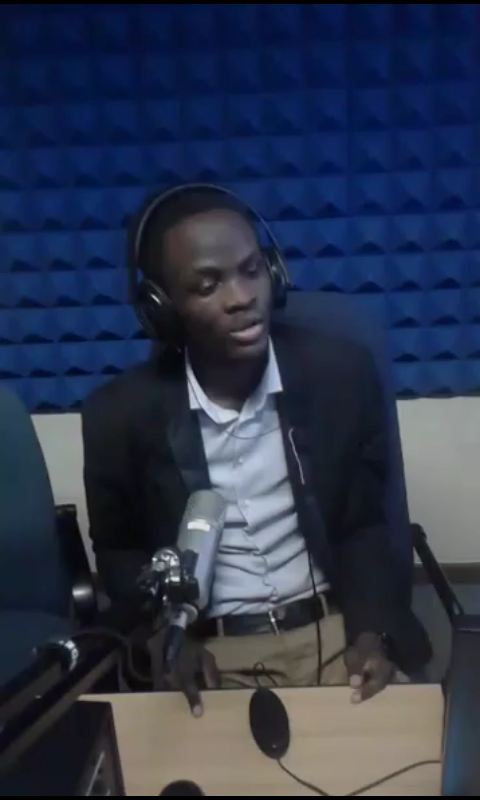
Kalimbwe during an interview with Energy 100 FM in 2018

Kalimbwe became subject to public condemnations after a publication on China–Africa Relations in which he called Chinese investors "parasites feeding on African blood". Chinese Ambassador to Namibia Qiu Xuejun stated that the publication was meant to tarnish China's relationships with Africa while the United Nations High Commissioner for Refugees's Namibia coordinator and SWAPO party Namibia National Liberation Association Chairperson Nkrumah Mushelenga expressed support for Kalimbwe saying the Chinese take advantage of Africa's poverty.
