= Panafrican Youth Union =

African Youth Organisation

The Panafrican Youth Union (PYU) is the apex body for National Youth Coordinating Bodies and Mechanism in Africa. Known formerly as the Panafrican Youth Movement (PYM), it was transformed into the PYU at the organisation's 2003 congress in Windhoek, Namibia.

== About ==
Based in Khartoum, Sudan, the organisation was formed in Conakry, the capital of the Republic of Guinea, on 26 April 1962, at the urging of African Heads of State and Government at the time, who wanted to create a platform to rally African youth behind the cause of the African liberation.

The organisation's structure consist of a Congress, Executive Committee, Secretariat, Regional Bodies and Specialised Committees, which are elected (once every three years), out of the 53 African member countries on the continent. The PYU is currently led by Julliana Ravona of Madagascar after the resignation of Congolese Francine Muyumba.Sudan, as the host member, also forms part of the secretariat.

The Pan-African Youth Union opened its new headquarters in Rabat.

== The Bureau of PYU 2011 -2014 ==
- President – South Africa:
- Secretary General – Mali:
- Northern Africa
- Vice President – Egypt:
- Deputy Secretary General- Libya:
- Western Africa
- Vice President – Senegal:
- Deputy Secretary General – Nigeria:
- Central Africa
- Vice President – Gabon:
- Deputy Secretary General- Gabon:
- Eastern Africa
- Vice President – Eritrea:
- Deputy Secretary General- South Sudan:
- Southern Africa
- Vice President – Namibia:
- Deputy Secretary General – Zimbabwe :

The Organisation is the principal youth body on the continent and enjoys a special status within the African Union (AU), and is often consulted among others by its Assembly of Heads of State and Government, the Executive Council, and the standing conferences of the AU such as Health, Youth, Immigration, Education and Gender on matters relating to youth.

The PYU is a founding member of both the International Coordination Meeting of Youth Organisations (ICMYO) and the Global Co-operation Co-ordinating Committee (GCCC).

== See also ==
- Youth voice
- Youth participation
