= International Coordination Meeting of Youth Organisations =

International network for youth movements

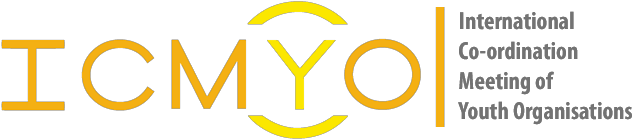
- Abbreviation: ICMYO
- Formation: 2004
- Region served: International
- Members: 30
- Website: icmyo.org

The International Coordination Meeting of Youth Organisations (ICMYO) is an international network for the world's largest youth movements and regional youth platforms. It was founded officially in 2004, and further strengthened in 2013. The network claims to:

The organization is aimed to unite and represent the diverse voices of youth-led organisations globally, by providing a platform for coordination and cooperation in order to have a stronger influence on global youth policy processes and to achieve full partnerships between youth organisations and relevant stakeholders.
The main objectives of ICMYO are:
- To represent the diverse voices of youth-led organisations globally
- Cooperation among youth-led organisations at regional and global levels
- Coordination of political inputs to global youth policy

Currently, the network meets once a year in an annual meeting which is organised by a task force elected the year before by the members.

== Members ==
There are two types of full member and two types of associate membership (there are no associate members at the moment).

=== Regional Youth Platforms ===
Region	Organisation name	Abbreviation
Africa	Panafrican Youth Union	PYU
Europe	European Youth Forum	YFJ
Asia	Asian-Pacific Students and Youth Association	ASA
Asia	Asian Youth Council	AYC
Latin America	Latin American Youth Forum	FLAJ
Pacific	Pacific Youth Council	PYC
Caribbean	Caribbean Federation of Youth	CFY

== See also ==
- Youth voice
- Youth participation
