= Lazarus Hangula =

Lazarus Hangula was vice-chancellor of the University of Namibia (UNAM), from 2004 to 2018. He replaced Peter Katjavivi, who left to become an ambassador for Namibia. Hangula earned his M.A. and Ph.D. (both cum laude) from the Johannes Gutenberg University of Mainz in Germany. Before being appointed vice-chancellor he served in various other roles at the UNAM, including Pro vice-chancellor for Academic Affairs and Research. Hangula was a member of Namibia's Delimitation Commission, a body advising on the country's administrative division. He holds a doctorate of philosophy and a master of arts (cum laude) from Johannes Gutenberg University in Mainz, Germany.

Hangula was conferred the Most Distinguished Order of Namibia: Second Class on Heroes' Day in 2014.
