= Klein Windhoek =

Suburb of Windhoek

Coordinates: 22.5724°S 17.1050°E

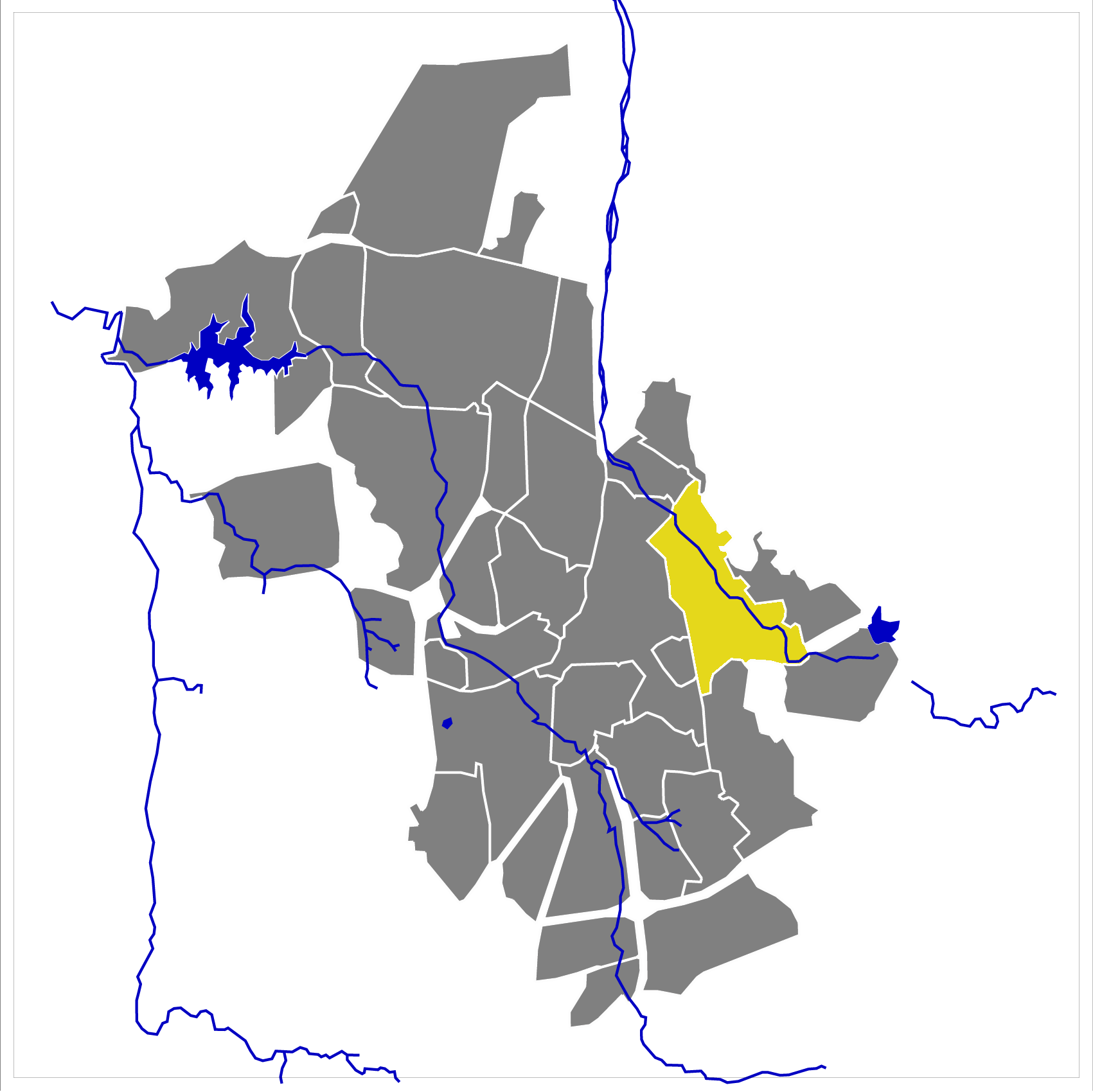
Klein Windhoek suburb (yellow) of Windhoek (dark grey)

Klein Windhoek (lit. 'Windhoek Minor' or 'Little Windhoek' in German) is an affluent suburb of Windhoek, the capital of Namibia.

== History ==
The British explorer James Alexander had already visited the area in 1837. Klein Windhoek is the oldest part of the town, having been established in 1840 by Jonker Afrikaner and his 800-strong group. He had requested the services of a missionary, and the Rhenish Missionary Society (RMS) built the first house in the area in the same year. In 1842, missionaries Carl Hugo Hahn and Franz Heinrich Kleinschmidt worked here. They called the place Elberfeld, but Jonker Afrikaner's name prevailed. They were replaced by Wesleyan missionaries in 1844.

In 1896, Roman Catholic missionaries arrived. They purchased the RMS land in 1899 and converted it into an orchard and vineyard.
