= Henny Seibeb =

Namibian politician

Deputy Leader and Chief Strategist of the Landless People's Movement (Namibia)
- Incumbent
- Assumed office 16 June 2018

Member of Parliament of Namibia
- In office 20 March 2020 – 21 March 2025

Personal details
- Born: Namibia
- Education: University of Namibia

Henny Hendly Seibeb is a Namibian politician and was a Member of Parliament who serves as Deputy Leader and Chief Strategist (DLCS) of the Landless People's Movement political party which he formed alongside Bernadus Swartbooi in December 2016.

== Early life ==
Henny Hendly Seibeb was born in Khorixas, Khorixas constituency, Kunene Region in Namibia on 7 December 1978. Seibeb grew up in a small communal settlement called Geluk (Karstenville) in Khorixas constituency. He was raised by his single mother Laurensia Seibes, grandfather Immanuel Saibeb and grandmother Eva Saibes. He has three siblings, Erine Erna Seibes, Scenceline Seibes and Vensentinus Seibeb. He started his primary school at Grootberg Primary school in Erwee in Sesfontein Constituency in Kunene region with Grade 1 and continued at T.H.F !Gaeb primary school in Khorixas for grades 2–5.

For grades 6–7, he completed it at Eddie Bowe Primary school (1992) and went for secondary school in 1993–1995 at Petrus !Ganeb secondary school in Uis, Erongo Region and eventually completing grades 11–12 at Cornelius Goreseb High school in Khorixas. He enrolled in 1998 at the University of Namibia (UNAM) for a Bachelor of Public Administration degree in 1998 and changed second year to a Bachelor of Education, but could not complete his studies due to lack of funding. He instead went on to teach Business Studies and Development Studies for grades 11 and 12 learners and Business Management for grade 10 learners. In 2003, he taught Business Studies, Environmental Management for grades 11-12 and Geography to grade 10 learners at Augustineum High school in Windhoek, Khomas region.

From thereon, he did a stint at BEMA College teaching business management subjects. In 2016, he returned to UNAM and enrolled for an Honours Degree in Bachelor of Public Management (majoring in Political Science) and graduated with an Upper Second class degree on 11 April 2019.

== Political career ==
Seibeb holds a controversial status in Namibian politics. Seibeb served as a Special Assistant to the former Secretary-General of SWAPO, Ms. Pendukeni Iivula-Ithana from 2008 to 2012 before being fired by her due to internal factional politics in SWAPO which pitted than SWAPO Vice-president late Dr. Hage G. Geingob against Ms. Iivula-Ithana for SWAPO succession race. Seibeb was accused by Iivula-Ithana and her camp consisting mainly of SWAPO Youth League of siding secretly with Dr. Geingob.

Previously, Seibeb also worked as Personal Assistant to the Minister of Environment and Tourism (2007), Reverend Willem Konjore, who was later shifted to Ministry of Youth, National Service and Sports.

In 2018, he was subject to public discussion after being pictured with a "Voetsek Geingob" placard in reference to president Hage Geingob's failed policies on land reform, as LPM then a mere social movement protested the Land Conference in November of that year.
