= University of Namibia =

Public university in Windhoek, Namibia

Coordinates: 22°36′40″S 17°03′27″E

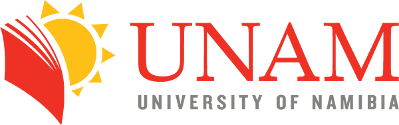
- Motto: Innovation and Academic Excellence
- Type: Public university
- Established: 31 August 1992; 34 years ago
- Chancellor: Nangolo Mbumba
- Vice-Chancellor: Kenneth Matengu
- Faculty: 2,500
- Students: 30,144
- Location: Windhoek, Khomas Region, Namibia
- Campus: 12 campuses and 11 regional centres
- Colors: Red; Gold
- Website: www.unam.edu.na

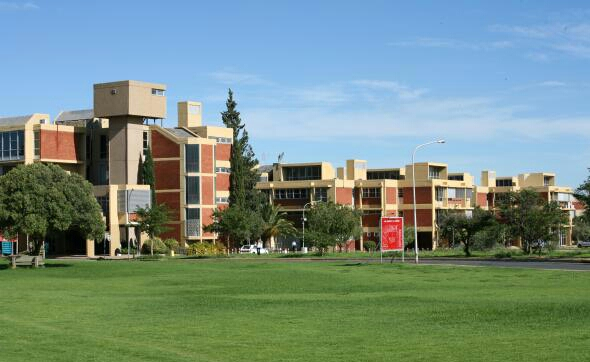
UNAM main campus

The University of Namibia (UNAM), once named the Akademie, was founded in 1978 by Prof. AJH Buitendacht, and he has transformed it into a multi-campus public research university in Namibia, and the largest university in the country. It was renamed by an act of Parliament on 31 August 1992.

== Background ==
UNAM comprises the following faculties and schools:

- Faculty of Agriculture and Natural Resources
- Faculty of Economics & Management Science
  - Department of Political Science
- Faculty of Education
- Faculty of Humanities and Social Sciences
- Faculty of Law
- School of Medicine
- Faculty of Engineering and Information
- Faculty of Science
- School of Nursing
- School of Pharmacy
- School of Public Health
- School of Military Science
- Centre for Postgraduate Studies

Ranked in the top 30 of tertiary institutions on the continent in the past 10 years, UNAM is one of the best universities in Africa. The University of Namibia is the only institution in the world to offer a doctorate in the study of the Khoekhoe language.

In 2023, UNAM was co-ranked 16th among the Top 100 Universities in Africa by the 2023 Times Higher Education (THE) World University Rankings.

== Campuses ==
The University of Namibia (UNAM) operates 12 campuses across the country, including:

- Eng. José Eduardo dos Santos Campus (Oshana Region)
- Hage Geingob Campus (Khomas Region)
- Hifikepunye Pohamba Campus (Oshana Region)
- Katima Mulilo Campus (Zambezi Region)
- Khomasdal Campus (Khomas Region)
- Main Campus (Khomas Region)
- Neudamm Campus (Khomas Region)
- Ogongo Campus (Omusati Region)
- Oshakati Campus (Oshana Region)
- Rundu Campus (Kavango East Region)
- Sam Nujoma Campus (Erongo Region)
- Southern Campus (//Karas Region)

== Faculty of Engineering and Information Technology ==
The Faculty of Engineering and Information Technology was founded on 1 January 2008 following the dissolution of the Department of Engineering and Technology, which had existed under the Faculty of Science since 2000. Sam Nujoma, the first president of Namibia and then-chancellor of the university, conducted the groundbreaking ceremony at Ongwediva on 17 November 2007. The ceremony took place on a 13-hectare plot of land that had been donated to UNAM by the Ongwediva town council.

In January 2008, the National Planning Commission approved funding for the construction of phase 1 of the new Faculty of Engineering and Information Technology (FOET) in Ongwediva. Construction work began in April 2008 with emphasis on lecture rooms, staff offices, laboratories, IT facilities, student hostels, staff houses, and other support facilities. The completion of these facilities (phase 1A) enabled the first batch of students to be admitted to the FOET.

== Marks scandal ==
In 2011, reports claimed that UNAM lecturers had been exchanging marks for sexual favours from students and exchanging completed assignments for money. It was claimed this had resulted in serious academic degradation. Investigating and combating such illegal practices has since become a priority for the Namibian government and UNAM management.

== Notable alumni ==
The University of Namibia has produced several notable and famous public individuals since its founding, including:

- Sebastian Ignatius ǃGobs, Namibian politician – Class of 1995
- Fransina Kahungu, former mayor of Windhoek
- Theo-Ben Gurirab received a Doctorate of Law honoris causa – Class of 1999
- Pendukeni Iivula-Ithana received Bachelor of Laws and B.Juris degrees – class of 1998 and 1999
- Julia Imene-Chanduru, diplomat who has served as Deputy Permanent Representative of Namibia to the United Nations in New York and as Permanent Representative of Namibia to the United Nations Office in Geneva
- Alfredo Tjiurimo Hengari, political scientist and presidential spokesperson to Hage Geingob – Class of 2001
- Monica Geingos, First Lady of the Republic of Namibia and businesswoman – Class of 2002
- Petrina Haingura, Namibian politician – Class of 2002
- Sacky Shanghala, former Namibian Minister of Justice – Class of 2003
- Sisa Namandje, Namibian lawyer – Class of 2003
- Bernadus Swartbooi, Namibian politician and president of the Landless People's Movement (Namibia) – Class of 2003
- Peya Mushelenga, Minister of Urban and Rural Development – Class of 2003
- Tangeni Amupadhi – journalist and editor of The Namibian newspaper – Class of 2005
- Sam Nujoma, Namibian politician and former President of Namibia – Class of 2007
- Lucia Iipumbu, Deputy Minister of Industrialisation, Trade and SME development – Class of 2008
- Job Amupanda, Namibian politician and leader of the Affirmative Repositioning and member of parliament– Class of 2010
- Francine Muyumba, Congolese Senator, Former President of the Panafrican Youth Union – Class of 2012
- Joseph Kalimbwe, youth activist and author – Class of 2017
- Henny Seibeb, Namibian politician and deputy president of the Landless People's Movement (Namibia) – Class of 2019
- Inna Hengari, member of Parliament, youth politician, and student leader – Class of 2019
- Utaata Mootu, member of Parliament, youth politician – Class of 2019
- Emma Theofelus, member of Parliament, youth politician – Class of 2019
- Patience Masua, member of Parliament, youth politician - Class of 2020
- Ally Angula, Namibian accountant

== Notable faculty ==
- Elizabeth Amukugo
- Job Amupanda
- Bience Gawanas, former ombudsperson
- Dorian Haarhoff
- Lazarus Hangula
- Günter Heimbeck
- Nico Horn,
- Erold Naomab
- André du Pisani
- Colette Solomon, policy researcher and women's rights activist

== See also ==
- UNAM SRC
