= Landless People's Movement (Namibia) =

Political party in Namibia

- Abbreviation: LPM
- President: Bernadus Swartbooi
- Deputy Leader and Chief Strategist: Henny Seibeb
- Treasurer General: Aina Hanganeni Kodi
- National Events Coordinator: Ivan Skrywer
- Operative Secretary: Edson Isaacks
- Founded: 2017
- Registered: 8 February 2019
- Split from: SWAPO
- Headquarters: 11 Sauer Street; Windhoek; Khomas Region
- Student wing: LPM Youth and Student Command Element
- Ideology: Social democracy Democratic socialism Land reform Agrarian reform Progressivism; Federalism
- Political position: Centre-left to left-wing
- International affiliation: Progressive International
- Colors: Orange; Black; Green
- Slogan: Restoring Our Dignity
- Seats in the National Assembly: 4 / 104
- Seats in the National Council: 6 / 42
- Regional Councillors: 12 / 121
- Local Councillors: 16 / 378
- Pan-African Parliament: 0 / 5

Website
- www.lpmparty.org

The Landless People's Movement (LPM) is a political party in Namibia. It is led by former deputy Minister of lands and resettlement Bernadus Swartbooi, who serves as its President and chief change campaigner, and Henny Seibeb, the party's deputy leader. The party has four seats in parliament, which are occupied by the Party's President, Bernadus Swartbooi, Mootu Utaara, Isaacks Edison and Seibeb Henry.

== History ==
The Landless People's Movement was formed after Bernadus Swartbooi, deputy minister of land reform, who was fired by President Hage Geingob in December 2016 after refusing to apologise to Land Reform Minister Utoni Nujoma, whom he had accused of resettling people from other regions into the south of the country ahead of the Nama.

== Policies ==
Swartbooi has been a vocal advocate of land restitution and restorative justice for landless Namibians, including indigenous communities, who were dispossessed of their land. The party's youth wing is the LPM Youth and Student Command Element.

== Electoral history ==
=== Presidential elections ===
Election	Party candidate	Votes	%	Result
2019	Bernadus Swartbooi	22,542	2.70%	Lost ✗
2024	Bernadus Swartbooi	51,160	4.65%	Lost ✗

=== National Assembly elections ===
The party contested the 2024 Namibian general election and gained one seat in the Parliament of Namibia, in addition to its previous four seats, which the party had won in the 2019 Namibian general election. Its leader, Bernadus Swartbooi, was the party's presidential candidate and achieved the fourth strongest support nationally by receiving 4.65% of the national vote.

Election	Party leader	Votes	%	Seats	+/–	Position	Result
2019	Bernadus Swartbooi	38,956	4.75%	4 / 104	New	▲3rd	Opposition
2024	Bernadus Swartbooi	56,971	5.21%	5 / 104	▲1	▼5th	Opposition

=== Regional Councilors elections ===
In the 2023 Keetmanshoop by-election, LPM candidate Petrus Labuschagne won by 1,270 votes to claim victory for Keetmanshoop Rural Constituency Regional Councilor.
