= Khomas Region =

Region of Namibia

Coordinates: 22°48′S 17°00′E

- Region
- Location of the Khomas Region in Namibia
- Country: Namibia
- Capital: Windhoek

Government
  - Governor: Sam Nujoma Jr.

Population (2023 census)
  - Total: 494,605
- Time zone: UTC+2 (CAT)
- HDI (2018): 0.732 high · 1st
- Website: https://www.khomasrc.gov.na/

Khomas is one of the fourteen regions of Namibia. Its name refers to the Khomas Highland, a high plateau landscape that dominates this administrative subdivision. Khomas is centered on the capital city Windhoek and provides for this reason superior transportation infrastructure. It is located in the central highlands of the country and is bordered by the Erongo region to the west and the northwest and by the Otjozondjupa region to the north. To the east is the Omaheke region, while in the south is the Hardap region. The region is characterized by its hilly countryside and many valleys. It has well-developed economical, financial, and trade sectors. Khomas Region occupies 4.5% of the land area of Namibia but has the highest population of any of its regions (16.2%). Khomas is one of only three Namibian regions to have neither shoreline nor a foreign border.

== Politics ==
Khomas constituencies (2014)

Khomas is important electorally, as it is by far the most populous of the Namibian regions. As of 2020, it has 264,905 registered voters.

The governor of Khomas Region was Laura McLeod-Katjirua from 2012. and as from 2025 is Sam Nujoma Jr.

The region comprises ten constituencies:

- John Pandeni (until 2008: Soweto)
- Katutura Central
- Katutura East
- Khomasdal Constituency (until 2013: Khomasdal North Constituency)
- Moses ǁGaroëb (created in 2003 from a split of Hakahana constituency)
- Samora Machel (until 2003: Wanaheda)
- Tobias Hainyeko (created in 2003 from a split of Hakahana constituency)
- Windhoek West
- Windhoek East
- Windhoek Rural

=== Regional elections ===
Khomas region and the capital Windhoek was until 2020 dominated by the South West Africa People's Organization (SWAPO) party. In the 2004 regional election for the National Assembly of Namibia, SWAPO won all ten constituencies.

In the 2015 regional elections, SWAPO obtained 81% of the total votes (2010: 78%) and again won in all ten constituencies. In the 2020 regional election SWAPO obtained 38% of the total votes. It was still the strongest party but lost Windhoek Rural to the Landless People's Movement (LPM, a new party registered in 2018), Windhoek East to the Independent Patriots for Change (IPC, also a new party formed in August 2020), and Katutura Central to the Popular Democratic Movement (PDM).

== Economy and infrastructure ==
Khomas has 100 schools with a total of 73,302 pupils.

== Demographics ==
According to the Namibia 2023 Population and Housing Census, Khomas has a population of 494,605 (253,520 females and 241,085 males or 95 males for every 100 females) growing at an annual rate of 3.1%. The fertility rate was 2.5 children per woman. 98.3% lived in urban areas while 1.7% lived in rural areas, and with an area of 37,007 km^{2}, the population density was 13.4 persons per km^{2}. By age, 10.6% of the population was under 5 years old, 17.4% between 5–14 years, 67.8% between 15–59 years, and 4.2% 60 years and older. The population was divided into 144,630 households, with an average size of 3.3 persons. 45.2% of households had a female head of house, while 54.8% had a male. For those 15 years and older, 72.5% had never married, 18.6% married with certificate, 2.0% married traditionally, 3.4% married by consensual union, 1.6% were divorced or separated, and 1.6% were widowed.

In 2001, the most commonly spoken languages at home were Oshiwambo (37% of households), Afrikaans (24%), Nama/Damara (13%), and Otjiherero (9%). Other languages found in Khomas are English, German, and a smattering of other Namibian language groups. For those 15 years and older, the literacy rate was 95.8%. In terms of education, of those 15 years and older, 68.9% had left school, 24.5% were currently at school, and 4.7% had never attended.

Households in Khomas earn by far the highest average annual income at N$47,407, well more than the national average of N$17,198. There is very limited subsistence farming in the region, with only 0.4 percent of the population engaged in farming, 0.3 percent of households are rearing animals, and 0.1 percent are earning income from cash cropping. Windhoek accommodates most of Namibia's light industry and manufacturing. Some of the most important are meat processing, bottling and canning, beer brewing, plastics, and refrigeration. The city is also Namibia's educational, commercial, and tourism capital. In 2001 the employment rate for the labor force (46% of those 15+) was 71% employed and 29% unemployed. For those 15+ years old and not in the labor force (50%), 55% were students, 25% homemakers, and 20% retired, too old, etc. According to the 2012 Namibia Labour Force Survey, unemployment in the Khomas Region stood at 26.5%. The two studies are methodologically not comparable.

Among households, 98.7% had safe water, 17.0% no toilet facility, 64.1% electricity for lighting, and 9.8% had wood or charcoal for cooking. In terms of households' main sources of income, 0.5% derived it from farming, 64.4% from wages and salaries, 11.7% from business or non-farming, and 4.8% from old-age pension.

For every 1000 live births in 2001 there were 53 female infant deaths and 54 male. The life expectancy at birth was 56 years for females and 54 for males. Among children younger than 15, 5% had lost a mother, 10% a father, and 1% were orphaned by both parents. 4% of the entire population had a disability, of which 22% were deaf, 44% blind, 11% had a speech disability, 9% hand disability, 15% leg disability, and 4% mental disability.
