= Markus Kooper =

Markus Kooper

Reverend Markus Kooper (12 September 1918 – 9 December 2005) was a Namibian activist, educator and religious figure. From Hoachanas in the Hardap Region, Kooper was one of the first Namibians who travelled to the United Nations to petition for his country's independence from apartheid South Africa. He is buried at the National Heroes Acre memorial cemetery outside of Windhoek.

Kooper studied with the Rhenish Missionary Society and received teacher training in Okahandja from 1939 to 1942. He then taught at missionary schools in Stampriet, Gochas and Hoachanas until 1946 and became headmaster at Hoachanas in 1949. He also attended ministry training with the African Methodist Episcopal Church and was ordained as deacon. Kooper became the spiritual leader of his community and was appointed to Hoachanas' Pastoral Church in 1955.

In 1956, Kooper spoke before the United Nations on the issue of South West Africa along with Reverend Michael Scott, Mburumba Kerina, Hans Beukes, Fanuel Kozonguizi, Sam Nujoma, Ismael Fortune, Jacob Kuhangua and Hosea Kutako.

The Boere population of Hoachanas resented the presence of the 400-odd Nama residents and repeatedly tried to have them evicted. In 1959 they obtained an eviction order that was confirmed by the High Court in Windhoek. On 29 January 1959, Kooper and his family was resettled by force to Itsawisis, a village 50 kilometres (31 mi) north of Keetmanshoop, almost 300 kilometres (190 mi) away from his home settlement. He was brought back by his community in November of that year.

Markus Kooper went into exile in 1960 to petition the UN again, this time as representative of the South West Africa United National Independence Organisation (SWAUNIO). He returned only in 1976 and established a private school at Hoachanas but remained politically active. His community resisted all resettlement attempts throughout the days of apartheid.

Kooper later joined SWAPO and became a member of its Elders' Council. In March 2000 he was awarded the Most Distinguished Order of Namibia.
