= Jacob Kuhangua =

Namibian nationalist and activist (born 1933)

Secretary General of SWAPO
- In office 1960–1970
- President: Sam Nujoma
- Preceded by: office established
- Succeeded by: Moses ǁGaroëb

Secretary General of Ovamboland People's Organization
- In office 1959–1960
- Preceded by: office established
- Succeeded by: office abolished

Personal details
- Born: Ovamboland, South West Africa
- Party: SWAPO
- Occupation: Politician

Jacob Kuhangua (1933–?) was a Namibian nationalist and anti-colonial activist who played a key role in the pre-independence movement. He was a founding member of the South West Africa People's Organization (SWAPO) in 1960 and served as its first Secretary-General. He was a close ally of Sam Nujoma and played a crucial role in mobilizing early nationalist efforts across South West Africa. Kuhangua helped shape the ideological and organizational foundations of the liberation struggle and was one of the first Namibians to petition the United Nations for the country's independence. He later served as a high-ranking administrator in South West Africa prior to Namibia's independence.

== Biography ==
=== Early life ===
Jacob Kuhangua was born in 1933 in Ovamboland and educated by the Anglican Saint Mary's Mission. He began his career as a schoolteacher and later worked as a colonial clerk. In the mid-1950s, he joined the underground Mandume Movement alongside future friends like Sam Nujoma, Louis Nelengani, and Lucas Nepela, promoting early resistance to South African colonial rule.

=== Political career ===
Kuhangua's political career began in the mid-1950s in Cape Town, South Africa, where he was working under the contract labour system. In 1957, he was one of the co-founders of the Ovamboland People's Congress (OPC), alongside Andimba Toivo ya Toivo, Jariretundu Kozonguizi, Emil Appolus, Andreas Shipanga, and others. The following year, Ya Toivo sent a petition to the United Nations protesting human rights abuses in the contract labour system and the unlawful occupation of South West Africa by the apartheid government of South Africa. These events led to the mass deportation of Namibian contract workers from Cape Town. Kuhangua was deported back to South West Africa and was stationed in Windhoek, where he immediately got involved in political activities. As a founding member of the OPC, Kuhangua played a leading role in its transformation into the Ovamboland People's Organization (OPO) in April 1959. He was elected as OPO's Secretary-General and led the first Windhoek branch of OPO in the Old Location with Sam Nujoma.

In September 1959, the South West African National Union (SWANU) was established as an umbrella body for anti-colonial resistance groups including OPO. As a result, Kuhangua became a member of its executive committee. Kuhangua, alongside OPO and SWANU leadership, organized the municipal boycott that led to the Old Location Uprising on 10 December 1959. Following the uprising, OPO came under increasing pressure from the South African authorities, who closely monitored its political activities. Kuhangua was later arrested and deported to Ovamboland. The following year in February, OPO president Sam Nujoma and vice president Louis Nelengani fled into exile via Botswana to Tanzania. Kuhangua remained politically active in Ovamboland, playing a role in the transition of OPO into the South West Africa People's Organization (SWAPO) in April 1960. He was re-elected as Secretary-General in absentia and continued to play a vital administrative and diplomatic role in SWAPO during the early years of the movement.

In August 1960, he escaped and went into exile via Angola, Zambia, Tanzania, and Ethiopia. He reached New York and joined Sam Nujoma, Jariretundu Kozonguizi, Mburumba Kerina, and Rev. Michael Scott at the United Nations. He remained in New York serving as SWAPO's petitioner to the United Nations. During this time, he studied at Lincoln University in the USA. On November 23, 1962, the United States held a memorandum of conversation regarding their policy on South West Africa. The meeting involved Kuhangu and Nujoma. In 1965, he represented SWAPO as an observer at the International Court of Justice in The Hague, alongside Nujoma and Emil Appolus. He remained in New York as SWAPO's UN petitioner until his return to Tanzania in 1966, after the Organisation of African Unity recognized SWAPO as the sole legitimate representative of the Namibian people.

=== Years in Tanzania, SWAPO “crisis era” ===
Following its formal establishment, SWAPO experienced rapid growth, driven by international support and recognition between 1960 and 1965. This sudden expansion led to what some have described as a “crisis era” within the party. Internal struggles emerged over leadership, direction, and ideology, influenced by Cold War geopolitics.

In 1966, Jacob Kuhangua visited the SWAPO's Kongwa military training camp to address PLAN recruits. In a controversial speech, he questioned the SWAPO leadership's commitment to the armed struggle, suggesting it was merely a strategy to gain international support. Kuhangua stressed that Namibia's future depended on educated and skilled individuals, and encouraged trainees to prioritize studying over military training. This sparked backlash from PLAN commanders, who accused Kuhangua and others of undermining the liberation cause.

Tensions within SWAPO escalated due to Cold War ideological divisions. Kuhangua, educated in the United States, was critical of the Soviet Union and communism, while SWAPO vice president Louis Nelengani, trained in the USSR, held staunchly anti-Western views. This ideological rift created a deep divide among Namibians in exile, splitting them into rival factions aligned with either pro-Western or pro-Soviet ideologies. In 1968, these tensions culminated in a violent incident when Nelengani stabbed Kuhangua in the back with a kitchen knife in Dar es Salaam. The attack left Kuhangua partially paralyzed due to spinal nerve damage. His friends in the United States arranged for him to receive treatment abroad, but the injury confined him to a wheelchair, effectively ending his political career.

At the 1969–70 SWAPO Consultative Congress in Tanga, Kuhangua was replaced as Secretary-General of SWAPO by Moses ǁGaroëb due to his health condition. Kuhangua later returned to Namibia, spending his final years at Oshakati State Hospital and the ELCIN Rehabilitation Centre before his death. After his stabbing, he largely disappeared from the public view and record, which is partly why the specific date of his death remains unresolved in biographical accounts.
