= Emil Appolus =

Namibian politician (1935–2005)

Personal details
- Born: 10 March 1935 Vaalgras, ǁKaras Region
- Died: 28 May 2005 (aged 70) Keetmanshoop
- Party: SWAPO
- Spouse: Putuse Appolus (m. 1952)
- Occupation: Politician

Emil Appolus (10 March 1935, in Vaalgras, ǁKaras Region - 28 May 2005, in Keetmanshoop) was a Namibian politician and businessperson.

Living in Cape Town, Appolus was part of early discussions on Namibian independence. In 1957, Appolus became a founding member of the Ovamboland People's Congress, the forerunner to the current ruling party, SWAPO. When the OPC merged to create SWANU, Sam Nujoma and Fanuel Kozonguizi were two of the five members of the executive committee. He authored the first Black newspaper in Namibia, The South West News (Afrikaans: Die Suidwes Nuus). The South West News was later banned for nationalistic content. After involvement in the 1960-65 Congo Crisis, Appolus ended up in Northern Rhodesia (now Zambia), where he was deported to Pretoria, South Africa for illegally leaving the country. After receiving bail, Appolus fled to Bechuanaland (now Botswana) en route to Tanganyika (now Tanzania). Appolus was the first SWAPO representative in Cairo, an important position for drawing support for national liberation. In 1969, Appolus was sent to represent SWAPO at the United Nations.

Appolus, along with Andreas Shipanga and others, broke with SWAPO during the 1975-76 Shipanga Rebellion. Beginning in 1975, he led the Namibia Democratic Party. Returning to Namibia in 1978, Appolus became an early member of SWAPO-D. From 1985 to 1989, SWAPO-D was part of a Transitional Government of National Unity and Appolus was a member of the National Assembly. However, the TNUG and SWAPO-D were unpopular and SWAPO-D did not earn a seat in the first national elections in Namibian history, held in 1989. Appolus retired from politics following the disbandment of SWAPO-D in 1989. He became a businessperson and at one time owned a fishing company.

Appolus married Putuse Appolus in 1952, an independence activist who was later recognised as a national heroine of Namibia for her role in the Old Location Uprising on 10 December 1959. The couple had two children. He suffered a stroke in 2004 which physically weakened him. He died in Keetmanshoop on 28 May 2005 at the age of 70. He is buried in his home village of Vaalgras.
