= Eliaser Tuhadeleni =

Namibian activist

- Born: 1 January 1918; Omatangela, German South West Africa (present-day Namibia)
- Died: 28 November 1997 (aged 79); Windhoek, Namibia
- Other name: Kaxumba Kandola
- Political party: South West Africa People's Organization (1960-1997)
- Other political affiliations: Ovamboland People's Organization (1957-1960)
- Movement: Namibian Independence; Mandume Movement
- Criminal charges: Dissidence
- Criminal penalty: Lifetime sentence
- Criminal status: Released (1985)
- Military career
- Branch: People's Liberation Army of Namibia
- Service years: 1965-1990

Eliaser Inamutwika Noah Tuhadeleni, nom de guerre: Kaxumba kaNdola (1 January 1918 – 28 November 1997) was a Namibian anti-apartheid activist, guerrilla fighter, and political prisoner. He was one of the co-founders of the Ovamboland People's Congress in Cape Town, South Africa, and became one of the first participants in the Namibian War of Independence. Tuhadeleni also took part in the battle of Omugulugwombashe, which was the first battle of the Namibian War of Independence.

Tuhadeleni evaded arrest but was eventually caught and sent to Pretoria Central Prison, where he was charged under the Terrorism Act of 1967. He was tried with other Namibians in the Pretoria Terrorism Trial from September 1967 to February 1968 and was sentenced to life imprisonment on Robben Island, but was released in 1985. He died in November 1997.

== Early life ==
Kaxumba kaNdola was born in Omatangela village, Ongenga Constituency, in the northern part of Namibia, a year after the British-South African forces conquered the Oukwanyama kingdom. His father, Lyaalala ya Tuhadeleni, was one of the senior headmen of Oukwanyama King Mandume ya Ndemufayo. Kaxumba kaNdola's wife was Priskila Ndahambelela Tuhadeleni, and they had seven children together. The Tuhadeleni household is based in Omanyoshe village in Endola Constituency, Ohangwena Region.

== Political career ==
In 1943, Kaxumba kaNdola got involved in political activities as a member of the Mandume Movement. He was involved in a workers' strike at the Kranzberg Mine, near Omaruru. Kaxumba closely worked with the Anglican priest Theophilus Hamutumbangela, writing petitions and sending them to the colonial administration and the United Nations, complaining about the ill-treatment of migrant workers.

In the mid-1950s, Kaxumba left Namibia for South Africa. He was one of the first Namibians to work in Cape Town through the contract labour system. He became a member of the "Barber Shop Crew," which was instrumental in forming the Ovamboland People's Congress (OPC) in 1957. The following year, the leader of OPC, Andimba Toivo ya Toivo, sent a petition to the United Nations through Mburumba Kerina and Rev. Michael Scott, based in the United States, complaining about human rights abuses in the contract labour system and the unlawful occupation of South West Africa by the apartheid government of South Africa. This led to a mass deportation of Namibian contract workers from Cape Town. Kaxumba was one of those deported from the city.

In 1959, the OPC was formally constituted into the Ovamboland People's Organization (OPO) by Jacob Kuhangua and Sam Nujoma in Windhoek, and Kaxumba became one of its leaders in Ovamboland, where he held meetings with local people known as Oyoongi ya Kaxumba ("Kaxumba's rallies"). He used these meetings to mobilize and educate them about colonial resistance. Following the transformation of OPO into the South West Africa People's Organization (SWAPO) in 1960, many of its leaders went into exile to lobby for support from the international community and to pursue the armed liberation struggle. Kaxumba remained in the country as one of the main leaders. His house was raided multiple times and used for important SWAPO meetings by internal leaders. He eventually went into exile in 1965 to prepare for the armed liberation struggle with the newly created People's Liberation Army of Namibia (PLAN). In 1966, when one of the first PLAN guerrilla units arrived in Ovamboland, they stayed at Kaxumba's home for several months before moving off to set up a camp at Omugulugwombashe. After the attack on Omugulugwombashe, the South African regime arrested SWAPO leaders, including Andimba Toivo ya Toivo and other members of the PLAN. They searched for Kaxumba for months before they were able to capture him.

He was eventually arrested and taken to Pretoria. He then became Accused No. 1 in the trial The State v. Tuhadeleni and 36 Others under South Africa's Terrorism Act of 21 June 1967. Ephraim Kapolo died during the trial in Pretoria, while Kaxumba and twenty-nine other Namibians were sentenced to Robben Island. He was one of those who received a life sentence. When Kaxumba spoke at his trial just before being sentenced to life on Robben Island, he "remained defiant and unbroken." Addressing the court, he said: "David slew Goliath because he had right on his side, and we Namibians have faith that we, too, have right on our side."

Tuhadeleni spent 18 years in prison until his eventual release in 1985. Namibia gained independence on 21 March 1990.

== Death ==
Kaxumba lived to see the independence of Namibia, where he died in November 1997 in Windhoek.
