= Helao Shityuwete =

Namibian politician, military commander and writer (1934–2026)

Helao Shityuwete (25 August 1934 – 29 August 2026) was a Namibian author, politician and military commander. After Namibia gained independence in 1990, Shityuwete published his autobiography titled "Never Follow the Wolf" which chronicled his time on Robben Island as well as his trial for involvement in the Namibian War of Independence as commander of the People's Liberation Army of Namibia, the military wing of the South West Africa People's Organization.

== Early life and exile ==
Born in Evale, Portuguese Angola, Shityuwete was the 19th child of 22 to his father and was named by his grandfather, Nelindi Shityuwete, king of Evale. He worked as a contract labourer under the apartheid South African occupation and became interested in politics working in Walvis Bay docks in 1959, when he was one of the labourers who first joined Ovamboland People's Organization, which on 19 April 1960 became SWAPO. He made several trips to Angola including with Jakob Kuhangwa, guided by Eliaser Tuhadeleni (nickname Kaxumba Kandola). In 1964 he was among a group that left Namibia and were arrested at the Botswana border and escaped and eventually arrived for military training in Tanzania. He returned to Namibia in 1966 as part of PLAN cadre G2 to participate in the Namibian War of Independence, but he and three of the four others of the group were arrested at Nkurenkuru by the South African Police. They were detained in Pretoria, South Africa, and held for two years before a trial in September 1967 for him and 32 others under the Terrorism Act of 1967. In 1968 he was sentenced to 20 years on Robben Island prison, others such as Nathaniel Maxuilili and Jason Mutumbulwa got lesser sentences. Ephraim Kapolo died during the trial in Pretoria. Others in Robben Island prison at the same time included Jerry Ekandjo, John Pandeni, John Ya Otto Nankudhu, Andimba Toivo ya Toivo, Gerson Veii, Kaxumba Kandola, Nelson Mandela and Walter Sisulu.

On 7 May 1984, Shityuwete was released from prison and in February 1985, received a scholarship through the Council of Churches in Namibia to study at the University of Birmingham in the United Kingdom, sponsored by Africa Educational Trust. He studied in Birmingham until 1987, when he graduated and moved to London, where he married Jane (née Prewett) and had a daughter, Tulimelila.

== Return to Namibia ==
Shityuwete returned to Namibia in 1989 upon the establishment of the Constituent Assembly, which wrote the Namibian Constitution. His family joined him on 16 March 1990, five days before Namibia's official independence on 21 March 1990. After independence, he was hired to help found the Ministry of Labour as Deputy Director of Human Resources, where he worked with future ambassador Ponhele ya France as well as Katrina Itula. He worked in the Labour Ministry until retirement in 1996. Their son, Freddy, was born in 1991. In 2008, Shityuwete was diagnosed with lymphoma and had successful surgery to remove the cancer in neighboring South Africa. In early 2010, he also suffered a stroke which left him unable to speak English, though he later recovered the ability to speak it through the help of a language therapist. He continued very active after his retirement, including in Namibia-Angola friendship and being Director of the Namibian Former Robben Island Political Prisoners Trust.

== Death ==
Shityuwete died at his home on 29 August 2026, at the age of 92.

== Sources ==
- Shityuwete, Helao, Never Follow the Wolf, 1990
