= Heroes' Acre (Namibia) =

War memorial in Namibia

Coordinates: 22.6638°S 17.0783°E

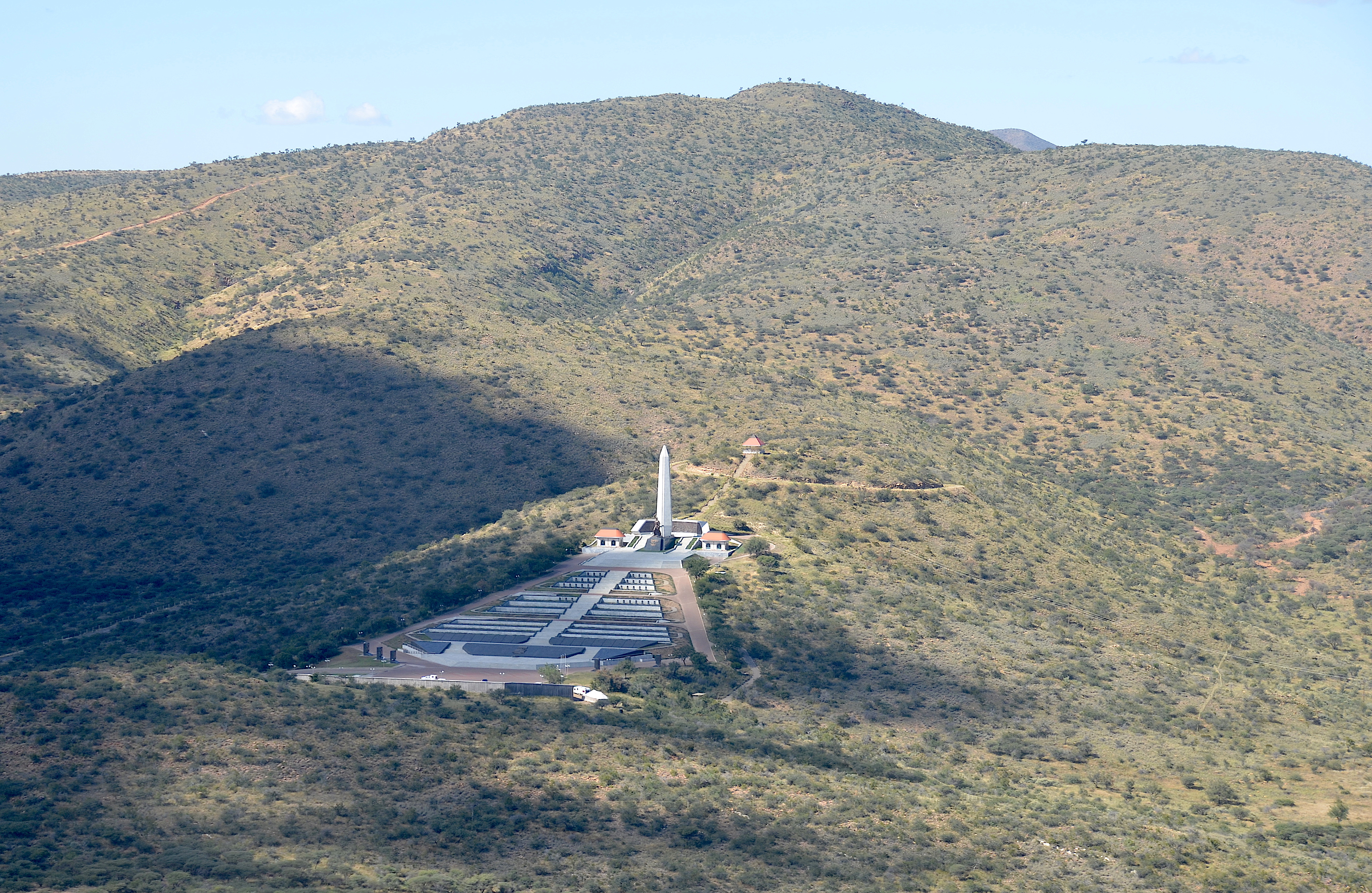
Aerial view of Heroes' Acre in 2017.

Heroes' Acre is an official war memorial of the Republic of Namibia. Built into the uninhabited hills 10 kilometres (6 mi) south of the city centre of Windhoek, Heroes' Acre opened on 26 August 2002. It was created to "foster a spirit of patriotism and nationalism, and to pass [this] to the future generations of Namibia".

== Construction ==
The memorial was designed and built by Mansudae Overseas Projects, a North Korean firm. It is one of four major public works Mansudae constructed in Namibia, the other three being Okahandja Military Museum, a new State House and the Independence Memorial Museum.

== Location and description ==
The Heroes' Acre monument is situated south of Windhoek on the B1 national road to Rehoboth. It is built as a symmetric polygon with a marble obelisk and a bronze statue of the Unknown Soldier at its centre. The site contains parade grounds and a grandstand for 5000 people. The burial site consists of 174 tombs, not all of which are currently occupied.

== Notable burials ==
=== Presidents ===
- Hage Geingob (1941-2024) in one of the mausoleums located at the monument. Geingob, who was at the time in his second term as president, played a pivotal role in the construction of the mausoleums that are reserved for the Namibian President and was the first to be buried in them.
- Sam Nujoma (1929-2025)

== Honored heroes ==
At inauguration nine national heroes and heroines were identified. For each of them a cenotaph with name and picture has been erected, although they are not buried here. The nine national heroes are:

1. Kahimemua Nguvauva (1850–1896), Chief of the Ovambanderu, was wounded May 1896 in the Battle of Sturmfeld and after his surrender executed by the Germans
2. Nehale Lya Mpingana (died 1908), King of Ondonga, defeated the settlers of the Dorsland Trek in 1886, and German colonial forces at Fort Namutoni in 1904
3. Samuel Maharero (1856–1923), Paramount Chief of the Herero people, led the uprisings against German colonialism that resulted in the Herero and Nama War of 1904–1907
4. Hendrik Witbooi (1830–1905), chief of the ǀKhowesin and fighter against the colonial oppression of the German Empire in German South West Africa
5. Jacob Morenga (1875–1907), used the fortress of ǁKhauxaǃnas to wage a guerrilla war against the Schutztruppe of Imperial Germany
6. Mandume Ya Ndemufayo (1894–1917), last king of the Kwanyama, led his people into battles with South African colonial forces
7. Iipumbu Ya Tshilongo (1875–1959), King of the Uukwambi and strong nationalist, resisted European cultural influence exercised via the establishment of mission stations and administrative outposts
8. Anna Mungunda (1910s–1959), protester against the forced eviction from Windhoek's Old Location in 1959. Set the car of a high-ranking administrator alight and was shot dead in response.
9. Hosea Kutako (1870–1970), Paramount Chief of the Herero and petitioner to the United Nations for an independent Namibia

=== Others ===
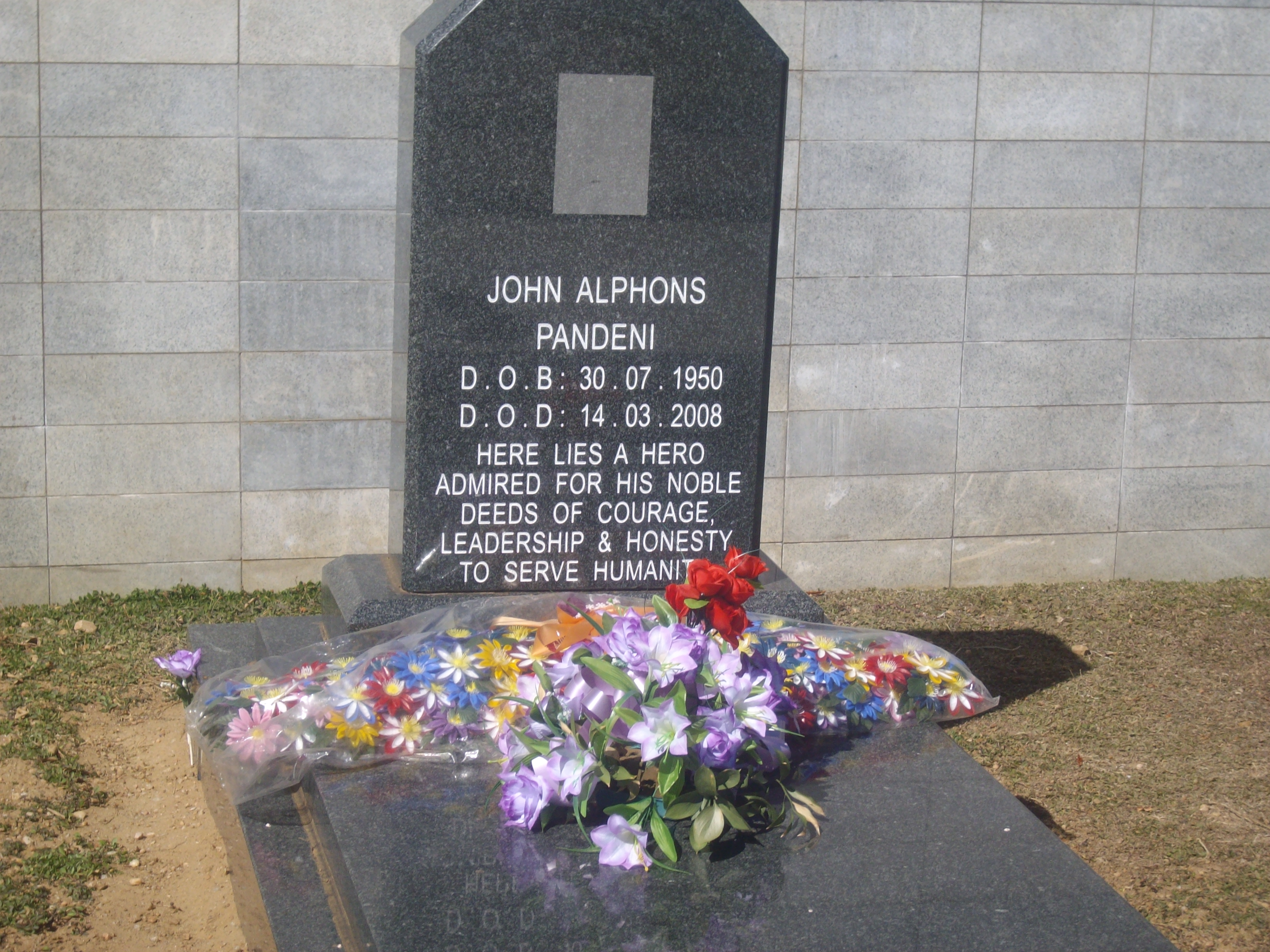
John Pandeni's grave

In later years, several additional people have been declared national heroes, and buried here. These are:

- Dimo Hamaambo (1932–2002), served as the second commander of the People's Liberation Army of Namibia
- Maxton Joseph Mutongulume (1932–2004), founding member of the Ovamboland People's Congress and long-term SWAPO functionary and Central Committee member
- Markus Kooper (1918–2005), petitioner to the United Nations
- Mose Penaani Tjitendero (1943–2006), first speaker of National Assembly
- Richard Kapelwa Kabajani (1943–2007), former cabinet minister and ambassador to Cuba
- John Pandeni (1950–2008), prisoner of Robben Island and later Namibian Minister
- Peter Tsheehama (1941–2010), People's Liberation Army of Namibia commander and Chief of Namibian Intelligence
- John ya Otto Nankudhu (1933–2011), People's Liberation Army of Namibia commander and Robben Island inmate
- Frederick Matongo (1946 or 1947–2013) Lieutenant Colonel of the Namibian Defence Force, early participant of the Namibian War of Independence against apartheid South Africa
- Andrew Intamba (1947–2014), first director of the Namibia Central Intelligence Service, and Namibian ambassador to Egypt
- Mzee Kaukungwa (1919–2014), veteran of the People's Liberation Army of Namibia and founding member of SWAPO.
- Gerson Veii (1939–2015), founding member of the South West Africa National Union (SWANU). Veii is the first opposition party member to be accorded a hero's burial
- Hidipo Hamutenya (1939–2016), former cabinet minister, long-time leading member of SWAPO, founder of RDP.
- Andimba Toivo ya Toivo (1924–2017), anti-apartheid activist, politician and political prisoner. Founding member of SWAPO.
- Theo-Ben Gurirab (1938–2018), former Prime Minister, former Speaker of the National Assembly, veteran diplomat of SWAPO.

There are further National Heroes of Namibia without any connection to Heroe's Acre, namely:

- Niko Bessinger
- David Moses Meroro
- John Mutwa
- Ida Jimmy (1945–2024)

Seven veterans of the Namibian liberation struggle were reburied on Heroes' Acre in 2014:

- Peter Nanyemba
- Walde Homateni Timoteus Kaluenya
- Isak "Pondo" Shikongo
- Natalia Ndahambelela Shikangala Mavulu
- Augustus "McNamara" Nghaamwa
- Putuse Appolus
- Lineekela Kalenga

On 26 August 2015, Namibia's Heroes' Day, three more veterans were reburied on Heroes' Acre:

- Moses ǁGaroëb
- Peter Mweshihange
- Anton Lubowski

== Construction controversy ==
Mansudae Overseas Projects, a company from North Korea was given a N$60 million contract from Namibia to build the 732-acre (2.96 km^{2}) monument. The contract was awarded without any competitive tendering process, and eventually the construction cost doubled. The non-transparent contracting of foreign manual labour has been criticised by corruption watchdog insight Namibia.

The memorial has been described as "monstrous" and its erection was speculated to "reveal a lack of African self-confidence". The statue of the Unknown Soldier resembles the physical features of Sam Nujoma (1929-2025), Namibia's founding president and ultimately the initiator of its erection.

In May 2005, a report in The Namibian noted that Heroes' Acre was "already showing signs of decay". In particular, a bronze statue of a soldier had suffered damage, as had the plinth on which it stood. Some of the gold-coloured letters forming an inscription on the plinth were broken or missing, and the letters were "made of a cement-like substance, which had been painted gold and then glued to the plinth".

== See also ==
- Heroes' Acre, Pretoria
- National Heroes' Acre (Zimbabwe)
