= Putuse Appolus =

- Born: September 23, 1930; Cofimvaba
- Died: October 28, 1986 (aged 56); Lusaka
- Spouse(s): Emil Appolus

Putuse Leonora Nomawele Dwyili-Appolus (September 23, 1930 – October 28, 1986) was a Namibian nurse. She is a national heroine of Namibia. Affectionately referred to as meekulu ("grandmother"), she is remembered as a freedom fighter in the Namibian struggle for independence from South Africa.

Putuse Appolus was born on September 23, 1930 in Cofimvaba, a small village in today's Eastern Cape province of South Africa. The youngest of fourteen children of subsistence farmers, she was educated at Lovedale College and studied nursing in Kwazulu-Natal. While working in Cape Town, she met Emil Appolus, a journalism student who would become a leading activist for Namibian independence. They married in 1952 in Keetmanshoop.

Appolus was working in a Windhoek hospital at the time of the Old Location Uprising on 10 December 1959. Following protests and an effective boycott of municipal services by Old Location residents, the police opened fire on the protesters, killing 11 and wounding 44 others. Doctors at the hospitals in Windhoek refused to treat the wounded, telling them to "go to the United Nations for treatment because these people were political patients". Appolus was one of the nurses tending the wounded from that day. As a result, the South African government issued a deportation order for her and she was sent to Bechuanaland in 1959 while five months pregnant. The Appolus family resettled in Elisabethville in the Belgian Congo. Trapped there during the Congo Crisis, Appolus worked in an understaffed hospital in Elisabethville. Following the conflict, they moved to Northern Rhodesia, where they were arrested by the British government. After her release she fled to Dar es Salaam, Tanzania with her two children. In Tanzania she worked at the Ocean Road Hospital.

In exile she worked on behalf of Namibian independence. In 1962 she was a founder of the Pan-African Women's Organization. She served on the central committee of the South West Africa People's Organisation (SWAPO) and was a founding member of the Swapo Women’s Council. In 1972, she gave up nursing for her work for independence and moved to Algiers, Algeria. She testified in 1973 in front of the United Nations Special Committee on Decolonization.

In 1986, she relocated to Luanda, Angola, where she planned to run a hospital. She died there of a stroke on 28 October 1986.

In July 2014 her remains were repatriated, and she was reburied at Heroes' Acre outside Windhoek
