= Warren Neidel =

Namibian footballer

Personal information
- Date of birth: 9 March 1980 (age 46)
- Place of birth: Tsumeb
- Position: Defender

Senior career*
Years	Team	Apps	(Gls)
2000–2004	Chief Santos		
2004–2005	Orlando Pirates Windhoek		
2005–2007	Benfica F.C.		
2007–2010	SK Windhoek		
2010–2013	Black Africa		
2013–2017	Orlando Pirates Windhoek		

International career
2003	Namibia	2	(0)
- * Club domestic league appearances and goals

Warren Neidel (born 9 March 1980) is a retired Namibian football defender.
