= Gerson Veii =

Namibian politician (1949–2015)

Gerson Hitjevi Veii (18 January 1939 – 14 February 2015) was a Namibian politician. Veii was founder member of the South West Africa National Union (SWANU) and its president from 1968 to 1982. After Namibian independence he was the first governor of Kunene Region.

Veii was born on 18 January 1939 in Kalkfeld in central Namibia. He was the first Namibian to be tried under the 1962 Sabotage Act of apartheid South Africa. Following a December 1967 speech in Windhoek's Old Location against the incarceration of SWAPO leaders in the wake of the military actions at Omugulugwombashe he was arrested, convicted of inciting racial hatred, and sentenced to five years in prison. He spent one year in solitary confinement in Pretoria, and a further four years on Robben Island. When he was released in 1972 he had developed a brain tumour and several other debilitating health problems. His family suspected that he was the subject of experiments on Robben Island. Veii died of cardiac arrest in Windhoek on 14 February 2015. He was married with eight children.

Veil was elected deputy secretary-general of SWANU in 1960. In 1968 while imprisoned on Robben Island he was elected party president in absentia, a position he held until 1982. Following Namibia's independence in 1990 he was appointed first Governor of Kunene Region.

Veil received a state funeral on 25 February 2015. He was buried at Heroes' Acre near Windhoek, the first card holder of an opposition party to receive this honour.
