= Namibia Democratic Party =

Nambian political party (defunct)

The Namibia Democratic Party was a political party in Namibia. The party was founded in Vaalgras, 1975. It was led by Emil Appolus. The party had its roots in the South West Africa United National Independence Organisation (SWAUNIO).
