= Ida Jimmy =

Namibian activist and politician

Ida Jimmy ǃHa-Eiros (1945–2024) was a Namibian independence activist and SWAPO politician. She is considered a national heroine of Namibia. Jimmy was born on 16 November 1945 in Lüderitz, South West Africa.

== Activism ==
She became a SWAPO member in 1972 and became chairperson of the SWAPO Women Council in 1977. At that time she worked for a fishing company. She lost her job for her activism and was detained several times. Jimmy served a 5 months, 3 weeks prison sentence in Gobabis in 1978 and was then placed under house arrest in Lüderitz for one year. In 1980 she was arrested under the Terrorism Act and sentenced to 7 years in prison. Upon appeal, the sentence was reduced to the minimum sentence under that act, 5 years. She gave birth in prison to her son Richard Konjeleni who initially was not allowed to be taken out, but was then taken to Jimmy's mother. When Richard Konjeleni died in 1983 she was not allowed to attend the funeral.

== Political career ==
After Namibian independence Jimmy became councillor of Keetmanshoop constituency. She also became a member of SWAPO's central committee and politburo.

== Awards ==
For her activist work she received awards from Namibian presidents Sam Nujoma and Hifikepunye Pohamba, as well as from Cuban president Fidel Castro.

== Death ==
Jimmy died on 3 April 2024, reportedly a poor woman. President Nangolo Mbumba ordered three days of national mourning in her honour for 19–21 April 2024 and directed that she receives a Hero's funeral. As a heroine, Jimmy-!Ha-Eiros was honoured with a 13-gun salute, during her burial. She was buried next to her husband Werner !Ha-Eirob on 20 April 2024 at the cemetery of farm Snip River, in the Bethanie district in Berseba Constituency (ǁKaras Region).
