= Rihupisa Justus Kandando =

Namibian politician (1963–2023)

Rihupisa Justus Kandando (12 July 1963 – 23 December 2023) was a Namibian politician. A member of the South West African National Union (SWANU), Kandando was the party's leader from 1998 until he was replaced by Usutuaije Maamberua in 2007. He was born in Gobabis, Omaheke Region on 12 July 1963, and died on 23 December 2023, at the age of 60.
