= Mburumba Kerina =

Namibian politician and academic (1932–2021)

Member of the Constituent Assembly of Namibia
- In office 1989–1990

Personal details
- Born: William Eric Getzen; 6 June 1932 Tsumeb, South West Africa
- Died: 14 June 2021 (aged 89) Windhoek, Namibia
- Party: SWAPO
- Spouse(s): Evelhardine Kapuuo-Kerina Naomi Kikii Zauana (m. 2017; died 2017)
- Education: Lincoln University; New School for Social Research; Padjadjaran University
- Occupation: Lecturer
- Profession: Politician

Mburumba Kerina (born William Eric Getzen; 6 June 1932 – 14 June 2021) was a Namibian politician and academic. He was a co-founder of SWAPO, NUDO, and FCN, and the founder of a host of smaller political parties. For independent Namibia, he was a member of Namibia's Constituent Assembly, as well as the National Assembly and the National Council. Kerina coined the name "Namib" for the independent state "Namibia" on the territory of South West Africa.

== Early life and education ==
Kerina had Ovambo and Ovaherero ancestry, and was also a great-grandson of explorer and trader Frederick Thomas Green, from which he derived his surname (Kerina Otjiherero: green). Mburumba was born William Eric Getzen on 6 June 1932 in Tsumeb. He grew up in Walvis Bay and went to school in Windhoek's Old Location where he attended St Barnabas Anglican Church School. While schooling he came into contact with Reverend Michael Scott, who would later enable him to study in the United States, and to become one of the early petitioners to the United Nations.

He went to the United States in 1953 and studied at Lincoln University in Pennsylvania. He graduated with a Bachelor of Arts in 1957. Kerina then became a graduate fellow at New School for Social Research, New York, and between 1960 and 1962 did a PhD at Padjadjaran University in Bandung, Indonesia. While in Indonesia, Kerina got an audience with then-president Sukarno, who, according to Kerina, advised him to find a better name for the territory of South West Africa whose independence he was fighting for. Kerina subsequently wrote an opinion piece in an Indonesian publication about a yet-to-be created country Namib and its nationalist movement, Namibianism. The claim for Kerina to have coined the name "Namib" is widely recognised, while Sam Nujoma, Namibia's founding president, is more commonly credited with the name "Namibia".

== Political career ==
=== Early years as UN petitioner ===
From 1956 onwards, Kerina was among the first petitioners to the United Nations for Namibian independence on behalf of the Herero Chiefs' Council. Other early petitioners besides Kerina and Scott were Hosea Kutako, Hans Beukes, Markus Kooper, Ismael Fortune, advocate Jariretundu Kozonguizi, and Namibia's founding President Sam Nujoma.

The year 1959 saw the establishment of two important Namibian black nationalist parties: the South West Africa National Union (SWANU) and the Ovamboland People's Organization (OPO). SWANU had its base among the Herero population while OPO was founded as an organisation of the Ovambo people. In December the Old Location Uprising in Windhoek gave the liberation struggle a different direction. Following protests and an effective boycott of municipal services by Main Location residents, the police opened fire on the protesters, killing 11 and wounding 44 others. A brother of Kerina was among those killed. The event was one of the factors leading to the foundation of SWAPO by forcing community leaders from OPO into exile, including Sam Nujoma. It is also probably one of the main reasons for SWAPO to have put less effort into petitioning and resistance, and to turn the independence struggle into an armed conflict.

Both OPO and SWANU soon realised that a broader group would serve the nationalist interests better. SWANU founder Fanuel Kozonguizi and OPO leader Sam Nujoma discussed whether a merger of OPO and SWANU would achieve that result but Kerina's suggestion to expand OPO into the South West Africa People's Organization (SWAPO) was implemented in 1960, mainly because SWANU did not have the full support of the Herero Chiefs' Council. Kerina became one of SWAPO's co-founders, and is the person to have suggested the name.

=== Fallout with SWAPO ===
The difference in preferred methods to lead the country to independence soon gave rise to different factions within SWAPO. Kerina was on the moderate side and disliked violence. He was expelled in 1962 for publicly discussing the formation of a new party. Morgan Norval writes:

However, all was not well [...]. A growing rift was developing between the moderates and the hardliners. The hardliners, led by Nujoma, were insistent upon following the path of a war of liberation. They looked with disdain on those seeking a political solution to the independence question in Namibia.

In 1964 Kerina returned from the US for an unsuccessful attempt to enter Namibia. He stayed in Bechuanaland (today Botswana) for a while but soon was expelled from there and moved to Tanzania. In September 1965 the National Unity Democratic Organisation (NUDO) was founded by Kerina, Clemens Kapuuo, and Hosea Kutako. NUDO at that time was an organisation that had mainly Herero followers. It was created at the suggestion of the Herero Chiefs' Council.

In 1966 Kerina broke with the Herero Chiefs' Council (and by extension, NUDO) again. That same year he established the South West Africa National United Front (SWANUF) in an attempt to unite SWANU and NUDO. The attempt was unsuccessful; the two parties remained partly adversarial. SWANUF ceased its activities at the end of the 1970s.

The Namibian War of Independence, which soon escalated into the South African Border War, started in August 1966. Later that year, the UN General Assembly revoked South Africa's mandate to govern South West Africa, and created the position of a United Nations Commissioner for Namibia.

=== Turnhalle Conference ===
In the meantime, the white inhabitants of South West Africa and conservative black members of the population, including Kerina, tried to contain the violence and preserve the status quo. The South African government hoped that by means of small reforms and compromises a broad spectrum of the indigenous population would cease their support for armed resistance. This was the aim of the Turnhalle Constitutional Conference, a controversial conference held in Windhoek between 1975 and 1977 which was tasked with the development of a constitution for a self-governed Namibia under South African control. Sponsored by South African government, the Turnhalle Conference laid the framework for the government of South West Africa from 1977 to independence in 1989.

The Turnhalle conference was widely criticised for providing "pseudo-reforms", entrenching the racial segregation of Namibia's population, and indirectly reinforcing the economic and political power of the white population. Several black delegates, however, welcomed the start of institutionalised communication between the parties. Kerina did not attend the conference—he only returned from the US in 1976 after the plenary sessions—but supported its outcome. He wrote in 1977:

The Constitutional Conference [...] has created a tranquil atmosphere in which all the people of Namibia are re-examining [...] institutions of the Territory at a round-table conference of equals dedicated to mutual coexistence and survival. This historic development is in conformity with major resolutions of the United Nations, the Advisory Opinions of the International Court of Justice, and the Lusaka Manifesto.

He also criticised the UN General Assembly's 1972 decision to recognise SWAPO as the 'sole legitimate representative' of Namibia's people:

It is unfortunate, indeed, that the United Nations has been prematurely hoodwinked into the recognition of one Namibian tribal faction as 'the sole authentic representative' group of all Namibians at the expense of the majority of the people.

After the Turnhalle conference Kerina initiated a number of political movements in South West Africa. He founded the Namibia Patriotic Coalition (NPC) in 1978 which entered into an alliance with the Rehoboth Liberation Front (LF) and the Liberal Party. The NPC soon became defunct and was reestablished in 1982 under the name Namibia National Democratic Coalition (NNDC). In 1988 Kerina co-founded the Federal Convention of Namibia (FCN) with Hans Diergaardt, who became its president.

=== Independent Namibia ===
In the pre-independence 1989 election the FCN gained one seat in the Constituent Assembly of Namibia which went to Diergaardt. When he resigned on health grounds, Kerina took over the seat from him and was elected Deputy Speaker of the house. After the Independence of Namibia in 1990 he also took FCN's seat in the 1st National Assembly of Namibia but resigned that same year.

Kerina returned to active politics in 1998 as Regional Councillor for the Aminuis Constituency on a Democratic Turnhalle Alliance (DTA) ticket. He was subsequently elected to serve in the National Council. In 2003 he quit the DTA and rejoined NUDO. He was expelled in 2005, allegedly for misappropriation of funds, an accusation he denied. In 2009 he again became a member of SWAPO. Asked why he changed his political affiliation so often, Kerina said: "I am a political marathon runner. I started in SWAPO, and now I'm doing the last mile".

== Academia ==
Between 1953 and Namibian independence in 1990, Kerina stayed in the United States but frequently visited Namibia for sustained periods. In the US he worked as an academic, holding both administrative and academic positions, often in parallel, at various institutions. Kerina held a lecturer position at New York City School of Visual Arts (1966–1968) and an assistant and later associate professor position at the Brooklyn College of the City University of New York (1968–1971). Between 1982 and 1992, he worked as a consultant.

== Personal life and death ==
Kerina was married to Evelhardine Kapuuo-Kerina. On 5 May 2017, he married Naomi Kikii Zauana. She died only one month later on 5 June 2017, at the age of 54. Kerina lived in Windhoek's Katutura suburb.

In 2019, the City of Windhoek named former Bahnhof Street in the central business district after him in recognition of his role in the fight for Namibian independence.

Kerina died due to COVID-19 in Windhoek on 14 June 2021, during the COVID-19 pandemic in Namibia. He was 89.
