= Ivan Namaseb =

Namibian footballer

Personal information
- Full name: Elie Ivan Namaseb
- Date of birth: June 22, 1985 (age 41)
- Place of birth: Windhoek, Namibia
- Position: Defender

Senior career*
Years	Team	Apps	(Gls)
2006–2007	Orlando Pirates		
2007–2009	FC AK		
2009–2010	Orlando Pirates		

International career
2008–2009	Namibia	11	(0)

Managerial career
- Orlando Pirates
- * Club domestic league appearances and goals

Ivan Namaseb (born 22 June 1985) is a Namibian former international football defender who played for Namibia. He is the head coach of Orlando Pirates S.C..

Originally from Windhoek, Namaseb spent most of his youth in Otjiwarongo. He played for Namibian side Orlando Pirates before signing for South African side FC AK in July 2007.
