= Ovamboland People's Organization =

- Abbreviation: OPO
- President: Sam Nujoma
- Vice President: Louis Nelengani
- Secretary General: Jacob Kuhangua
- Founders: Andimba Toivo ya Toivo, Jacob Kuhangua, Eliaser Tuhadeleni, Peter Mweshihange, Jariretundu Kozonguizi, Emil Appolus, Andreas Shipanga
- Founded: 19 April 1959
- Dissolved: 19 April 1960
- Preceded by: Ovamboland People's Congress
- Succeeded by: SWAPO
- Headquarters: Windhoek, South West Africa

The Ovamboland People's Organization (OPO) was a nationalist organization that existed in 1959 and 1960 in South West Africa (present day Namibia). The aim of the organization was to end the South African colonial administration, and the placement of South West Africa under the United Nations Trusteeship system. Andimba Toivo ya Toivo had founded its predecessor, the Ovamboland People's Congress, in 1957 in Cape Town, South Africa. In 1959, Sam Nujoma and Jacob Kuhangua established the Ovamboland People's Organization (OPO) at the Old Location in Windhoek. Sam Nujoma was the president of OPO until its transformation into the South West Africa People's Organization (SWAPO) a year later and remained president until Namibia gained independence in 1990.

== History ==
The formation of OPO is closely linked to the South West Africa Native Labour Association (SWANLA), a labour contracting organisation that recruited many Namibians, mainly from Ovamboland, through the controversial contract labour system to work on farms and mines in Namibia and South Africa. The contract labour system faced objections due to its harsh treatment and human rights abuses, raised by Namibian nationalists both within the country and abroad.

In 1951, Andimba Toivo ya Toivo moved to South Africa, where he worked as a railway police officer in Cape Town. Ya Toivo and others influenced by the politics of the African National Congress (ANC) met several times at a small barbershop in Cape Town to discuss Namibia's political situation and issues concerning the contract labour system. During the discussions on political action, the group formed the Ovamboland People's Congress (OPC) on 2 August 1957 under the leadership of Ya Toivo. Among the founding members were Jacob Kuhangua, Mzee Kaukungwa, Eliaser Tuhadeleni, Peter Mweshihange, Solomon Mifima, Maxton Mutongulume, Jariretundu Kozonguizi, Emil Appolus, Andreas Shipanga, Ottiliè Schimming and Kenneth Abrahams. The group's aim sought to end the exploitative contract labour system and policies of SWANLA. The information about the OPC's formation reached nationalist leaders inside the country. One of them was Sam Nujoma, who became one of the organization's front man leading its Windhoek branch. Nujoma went around to the workers' compounds talking to them about the formation of the new organization. By 1958, the organization had thousands of members and followers in compounds and locations all over Namibia.

In 1958, Ya Toivo sent a letter and a tape he recorded to Mburumba Kerina and Rev. Michael Scott, who were based in the United States, documenting human rights violations in South West Africa. This information was used to petition the United Nations. In December 1958, Ya Toivo was expelled from Cape Town shortly after the petition made headlines in the New York Times and was deported together with Jacob Kuhangua and Jariretundu Kozonguizi among others. After spending a few days in Keetmanshoop and then Windhoek the police were determined to deport him further to Ovamboland, where he was placed under house arrest in the kraal of the Ondonga Chief Johannes Kambonde.

On 19 April 1959, Jacob Kuhangua, Sam Nujoma, Louis Nelengani, Emil Appolus and Lucas Haleinge Nepela officially established the Ovamboland People's Organization (OPO) as the successor of the OPC at the Old Location in Windhoek. At the first congress Nujoma was elected president, Nelengani deputy president, Kuhangua secretary general and Nepela as chairperson. Ya Toivo was under house arrest during this time missing out on a position but he was deemed the organization's leader in Ovamboland. He would later become the Secretary of its Ondangwa branch where he played an important role in mobilizing new members and educated them about colonial resistance. During this time Nujoma and Ya Toivo had only communicated through letters; they had never met face to face until Ya Toivo was released from Robben Island in 1984.

In September 1959, the South West African National Union (SWANU) was officially launched at a public meeting in Windhoek with the backing of the Herero Chiefs' Council under the leadership of Chief Hosea Kutako. SWANU was established as an umbrella body for anti-colonial resistance groups to broaden and strengthen the nationalist basis of the movement. OPO became a member of SWANU and its leaders were members of SWANU's executive committee. Jariretundu Kozonguizi became the first president of SWANU after receiving strong support from OPO and the Herero Chiefs' Council.

OPO and SWANU leadership were instrumental in organizing the Old Location Uprising protest after the colonial administration forcefully moved residents of the Old Location to a new township, Katutura. On 10 December 1959, the police opened fire during a protest and killed 11 protesters. OPO and SWANU leaders faced arrest and were interrogated. After this event the two groups had different views on the way forward which culminated in OPO breaking out of SWANU to pursue the arms struggle. Sam Nujoma continued to face arrest and threats of deportation to Ovamboland. On 26 February 1960, after receiving advice from Chief Hosea Kutako he escaped and went into exile.

Shortly after arriving in Tanzania, Nujoma left to the United States and joined Mburumba Kerina and Jariretundu Kozonguizi to petition the United Nations. In New York, meetings between Nujoma, Kerina and Kozonguizi to unite OPO and SWANU in order to fight the common enemy as a united people were unsuccessful. Instead the idea to transform OPO into a pan-ethnic national liberation movement with a mandate to unite all people of South West Africa was birthed. On 19 April 1960, the OPO leadership in Windhoek transformed OPO into the South West Africa People's Organization (SWAPO). Nujoma was elected as SWAPO president in absentia, Kuhungua and Nelengani retained their positions as secretary general and vice president respectively. Following the transformation in 1960 many SWAPO leaders arrived in Tanzania to prepare for the launch of the armed liberation struggle. In 1962, SWAPO founded its military wing, the South West Africa Liberation Army (SWALA), which was later renamed the People's Liberation Army of Namibia (PLAN). Ya Toivo, Eliaser Tuhadeleni and other SWAPO leaders were able to facilitate the logistics that led to the establishment of the military bases inside the country.

On 26 August 1966, the South African Defence Force attacked SWAPO guerrilla fighters at Omugulugwombashe in northern Namibia. It was the first armed battle in the Namibian War of Independence which lasted until 1989. After the battle, about 63 SWAPO freedom fighters inside the country including Ya Toivo, Eliaser Tuhadeleni, John Otto Nankudhu, Immanuel Shifidi, Nathaniel Maxuilili and Helao Shityuwete were arrested at different occasions and air-lifted to Pretoria to face trial. They were tried under the Terrorism Act of 1967; the majority of them were sentenced to prison on Robben Island and some died in police custody during the trial. Namibia achieved independence on 21 March 1990, SWAPO won the first democratic elections and Sam Nujoma was sworn in as the first President of Namibia. SWAPO has been the governing party in Namibia since independence.
