= St Barnabas, Windhoek =

Former mission in Namibia

St Barnabas was an Anglican mission station, church, and school in Windhoek, the administrative centre of South West Africa. The school was situated in the Old Location suburb. When Old Location was closed for blacks in 1968 the existing buildings and institutions, among them St Barnabas, were destroyed.

== St Barnabas Anglican Mission School ==
The Anglican Mission St Barnabas was located in the Old Location suburb of Windhoek, an area exclusively for black people. The primary school at St Barnabas was founded in 1923. It was, at that time, the only school in the territory of South West Africa where teachers were black.

In the 1950s, the school had classes from grades 1 up to 12 (matric), and it also accommodated people that could only attend in the evenings. During the same period the Windhoek municipality and the South African colonial administration decided to forcefully move the residents of the Old Location 8 kilometres (5.0 mi) to the north of the city to gain more land for settlement by white people. In 1968, the Old Location was officially closed and whites began to settle while the forced removal prompted the evicted people to give the new location the name Katutura (Otjiherero: The place where we do not want to live). With the new designation for the suburb as an area exclusively for whites St Barnabas, and with it the school, was destroyed.

=== Notable alumni ===
A number of prominent Namibians attended St Barnabas, among them:

- Clemens Kapuuo (1923–1978) – paramount chief, OvaHerero
- Mburumba Kerina – co-founder, SWAPO (SWAPO Party of Namibia), the National Unity Democratic Organisation (NUDO), and the Federal Convention of Namibia (FCN)
- Sam Nujoma – founding president of Namibia; attended St Barnabas as from 1949
- Kuaima Riruako (1935–2014) – paramount chief, OvaHerero; president, National Unity Democratic Organisation (NUDO)
- Tjama Tjivikua – rector, Polytechnic of Namibia; attended St Barnabas from 1967 until the closure of the Old Location

== See also ==
- Education in Namibia
- List of schools in Namibia

== Literature ==
- Tonchi, Victor L; Lindeke, William A; Grotpeter, John J (2012). Historical Dictionary of Namibia. Historical Dictionaries of Africa, African Historical Dictionaries (2 ed.). Scarecrow Press. ISBN 9780810879904.
