= Ismael Narib =

Namibian footballer

Personal information
- Place of birth: Bramberg, South West Africa (now Namibia)
- Position: Striker

Senior career*
Years	Team	Apps	(Gls)
- Ramblers
- Try Again
1963–1969	Orlando Pirates SC		
1969–1970	Kaizer Chiefs	0	(0)
1970–????	Orlando Pirates SC		
- * Club domestic league appearances and goals

Ismael Narib, also known as Lemmy Narib, is a Namibian former footballer who played as a striker.

== Career ==
Born in the settlement of Bramberg, near the outskirts of Windhoek, Narib was raised in Old Location and Karibib, before returning to the township of Katutura during the late 1950s. He began playing football for Ramblers at the age of 15, and played there until his move to Karibib. After returning to Windhoek, he founded a team there called Try Again.

In April 1963, he and two of his childhood friends, Gideon Erky Klassen and Hans Eichab, founded a football club in Namibia called Orlando Pirates. With the club, he played for them into his mid-40s, winning every major competition in South West Africa, including two Mainstay Cups (the predecessor to the Namibia FA Cup) in 1977 and 1978.

In 1969, he was offered a contract by South African club Kaizer Chiefs, who were on tour and scouting players for the newly-formed team, after scoring 12 goals in three matches against them. He was one of two Namibian footballers signed by the club, with the other being Black Africa forward Herman Blaschke. However, during pre-season prior to the 1970 season, his father summoned him back to Namibia over fears that he would be exposed to the criminal side of Soweto.

As of 2016, he served as the technical advisor for the Khomas under-20 regional team.

== Personal life ==
Narib has seven children, with three of them, Jairzinho Gurirab, Ruucks Isaaks, and Maans Xoagob all playing football for Orlando Pirates. He was nicknamed "Lemmy Special", after South African penny whistler Lemmy "Special" Mabaso.

In July 2016, the Central Schools Soccer Association named their main tournament after Narib.
