= Ephraim Kapolo =

Namibian activist

- Born: 1924
- Died: 1967 (aged 42–43)
- Occupation: Activist
- Organization: South West Africa Liberation Army
- Political party: SWAPO

Ephraim Kamati Andjengo Kapolo (1924–1967) was a Namibian activist who participated in the pre-independence movement. He was one of the early members of the Ovamboland People's Organization. Kapolo was an active and founding member of the South West Africa Liberation Army (SWALA), the forerunner of the People's Liberation Army of Namibia (PLAN), at the beginning of the Namibian War of Independence.

== Arrest ==
In 1966, Kapolo was arrested with other prominent members of SWAPO following the battle of Omugulugwombashe. He was detained without trial and held in solitary confinement in Pretoria, South Africa for more than a year. Kapolo died in police custody in 1967 during the "terrorism trial": The State vs. Tuhadeleni and Others.

Among other arrested SWAPO members were; Andimba Toivo ya Toivo, Immanuel Shifidi, Eliaser Tuhadeleni, John Nankudhu, they were convicted under the Terrorism Act and the majority of them were sentenced to serve time on Robben Island.

== See also ==
- List of unsolved murders (1900–1979)
