= Vaalgras =

Village in the ǁKaras Region of southern Namibia

Coordinates: 26°09′00″S 18°27′00″E

Vaalgras (Afrikaans: pale grass) is a village in Namibia's ǁKaras Region. Located 60 kilometres (37 mi) northeast of Keetmanshoop, the village is also home of the Vaalgras Traditional Authority. It is home to a community of the Oorlam people, a group descends from the OvaHerero, Nama and other groups.

== Notable residents ==
- Emil Appolus
- Eric Biwa
- Willem Konjore (1945–2021), government minister
