= Andimba Toivo ya Toivo =

Namibian politician (1924–2017)

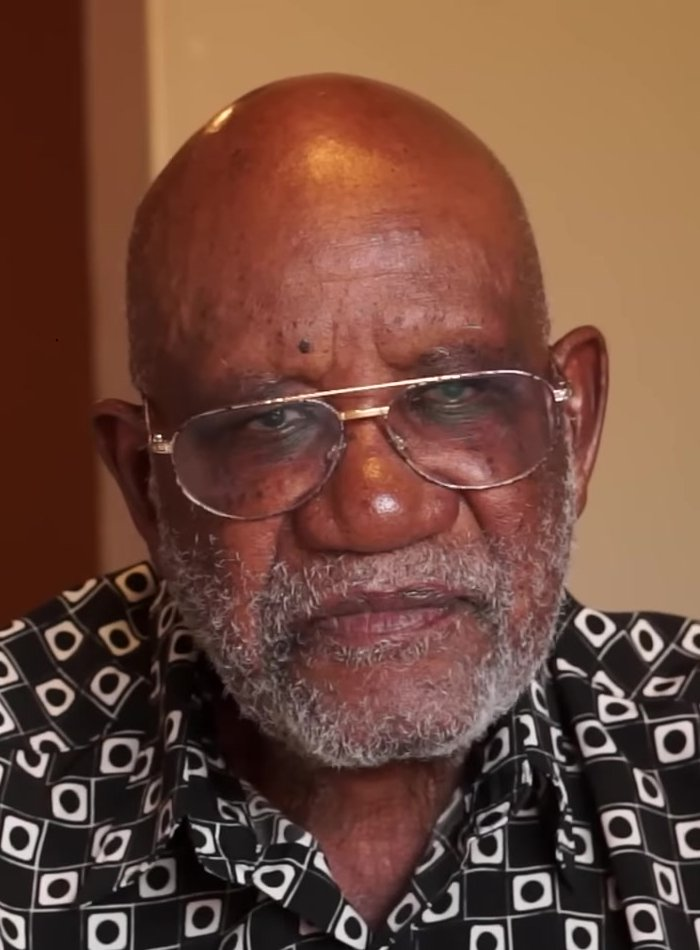
- Andimba Toivo ya Toivo in 2012

Minister of Prisons and Correctional Services
- In office 27 August 2002 – 2005
- President: Sam Nujoma
- Prime Minister: Theo-Ben Gurirab
- Preceded by: Marco Hausiku
- Succeeded by: Peter Tsheehama

Minister of Labour
- In office 26 March 1999 – 27 August 2002
- President: Sam Nujoma
- Prime Minister: Hage Geingob
- Preceded by: Moses ǁGaroëb
- Succeeded by: Marco Hausiku

Minister of Mines and Energy
- In office 21 March 1990 – 26 March 1999
- President: Sam Nujoma
- Prime Minister: Hage Geingob
- Preceded by: Position established
- Succeeded by: Jesaya Nyamu

Personal details
- Born: 22 August 1924 Omangundu, Ovamboland, South West Africa (now Namibia)
- Died: 9 June 2017 (aged 92) Windhoek, Namibia
- Party: SWAPO
- Spouse: Vicky Erenstein ya Toivo (m. 29 March 1990)
- Children: 2

Herman Andimba Toivo ya Toivo (22 August 1924 – 9 June 2017) was a Namibian anti-apartheid activist, politician and political prisoner. Ya Toivo was active in the pre-independence movement, and is one of the co-founders of the South West African People's Organisation (SWAPO) in 1960, and before that, its predecessor the Ovamboland People's Organization (OPO) in 1959.

Andimba grew up in the northern part of Namibia, however he spent some time in Cape Town in the 1950s. He became politicised there and joined the African National Congress (ANC). Back in Namibia he became one of the early petitioners to the United Nations, advocating for the independence of Namibia. Due to his political activism he was tried in 1966 under the Terrorism Act, and sentenced to 20 years in prison. He served 16 years in Robben Island in the same section as Nelson Mandela, to whom he was a personal friend. He was released in 1984 and rejoined SWAPO as secretary general in exile in Lusaka, Zambia. Ya Toivo returned to Namibia in 1989 in the wake of the country's independence and served as a member of parliament and as cabinet minister in Sam Nujoma's first government. He retired from active politics in 2006. Ya Toivo is a national hero of Namibia.

== Early years ==
Andimba Toivo ya Toivo was born on 22 August 1924 as second of seven children in Omangundu in Ovamboland, northern South West Africa. He attended the church school at Onayena but was herding cattle often, as was common for boys in this area. He trained to become a carpenter at Ongwediva Industrial School between 1939 and 1942.

In 1942 during World War II Ya Toivo voluntarily joined the Native Military Corps, a unit of the racially segregated army of the Union of South Africa. He fought on the British side of the Allied Forces. and attained the rank of a corporal during his service. When he was tried for terrorism in the 1960s he remembered his motivation thusly:

My lord, you found it necessary to brand me a coward. During the Second World War, when it became evident that both my country and your country were threatened by the dark clouds of Nazism, I risked my life to defend both of them, wearing a uniform with orange bands on it. But some of your countrymen, when called to battle to defend civilisation, resorted to sabotage against their own fatherland. I volunteered to face German bullets, and as a guard of military installations, both in South West Africa and the Republic, was prepared to be the victim of their sabotage. Today, they are our masters and are considered the heroes, and I am called the coward.

After the war he worked on a farm near Kalkfeld until he came back to Odibo and attended school at St Mary's Mission School to learn English. He had to change his religion from Lutheran to Anglican in order to be admitted. He completed Standard 6 but stayed on until 1950, graduating as a teacher, whereafter he successfully operated a store at Ondangwa. Toivo taught at St Cuthberth's School at Onamutayi and St. Mary's Odibo before travelling to South Africa for further studies in 1951.

== Political career ==
Toivo left for Cape Town in 1951 and was employed as a railway police officer between 1952 and 1953. He joined political movements such as the Modern Youth Society (MYS), where he met Denis Goldberg. He became the deputy chairman of the MYS, which organised festivals, lectures, discussion groups and night schools for activists who pursued further education.

He joined the African National Congress (ANC) at Cape Town in 1957. Later that year, he co-founded the Ovamboland People's Congress (OPC), forerunner of the Ovamboland People's Organization (OPO). He also established close contacts with the two South African parties the Congress of Democrats and the Liberal Party. The OPC sought to fight for the rights of migrant workers, some of whom had defected from the South West African Native Labour Association (SWANLA). The organisation also mobilised against the incorporation of Namibia into South Africa, and therefore shared a political allegiance with other organisations in South Africa.

In December 1958, Toivo, with the assistance of Goldberg, sent a tape to Mburumba Kerina and Michael Scott documenting human rights violations in South West Africa, after Chief Hosea Kutako was refused permission by the South African authorities to represent his people at the United Nations. This was used to petition the United Nations. Consequently, he was deported from Cape Town, first to Keetmanshoop and Windhoek and later to Ovamboland, where he was placed under house arrest in his home village Okaloko.

Toivo stayed in constant close contact with Leonard Auala from the Evangelical Lutheran Ovambo-Kavango Church (ELOC). Because of OPO's deep roots in the Ovambo people, ELOC subsequently gave its support to this national liberation movement. Members and supporters of OPO were also members of the congregation. The people, church and national liberation movement coincided. On its anniversary, 19 April 1960, OPO reconstituted itself as the South West Africa People's Organisation (SWAPO) in New York, Sam Nujoma was reconfirmed President of the new organisation. After its reconstitution, SWAPO founded its military wing, the South West Africa Liberation Army (SWALA), in 1962, and oversaw the beginning of an armed insurgency against the South African administration in 1965. On 26 August 1966 the first armed clash of the South African Border War took place when the South African forces attacked SWAPO guerrillas at Omugulugwombashe.

== Trial and incarceration ==
Because of his political activities in support of Namibian independence, Toivo was arrested in 1966 by the South African authorities. In his trial in August 1967, The state v. Tuhadeleni and 36 Others, he appeared as Accused No. 21. Eliaser Tuhadeleni, Nathaniel Maxuilili amongst other members of the People's Liberation Army of Namibia (PLAN), the armed military wing of SWAPO, were tried in the first trial under South Africa's Terrorism Act of 21 June 1967. Ephraim Kapolo died during the trial in Pretoria. The Terrorism Act was applied retroactively to convict these political activists from Namibia. The speech he made on behalf of his group after his conviction gained renown for its pronouncements denying South Africa the right to try South West African citizens or to rule their country. His speech from the dock made headlines and became an internationally circulated key document to rally support for the Namibian liberation struggle.

'We are Namibians, and not South Africans. We do not now, and will not in the future, recognise your right to govern us; to make laws for us, in which we had no say; to treat our country as if it was your property and us as if you are our masters. We have always regarded South Africa as an intruder in our country. This is how we have always felt and this is how we feel now and it is on this basis that we have faced this trial'.

— Andimba Herman Toivo ya Toivo, 1967.

Toivo was held in solitary confinement in Pretoria for more than a year before the sentence. On 26 January 1968, he was sentenced to 20 years' imprisonment by the Pretoria Supreme Court. He was incarcerated at Robben Island, near Cape Town, where he spent much of his time isolated from his fellow countrymen. As a prisoner he was not an easy fellow, never showing remorse and often up for a fight with the authorities. Fellow Robben Island inmate Mike Dingake remembers:

A few meters from my cell, [...] warders tried to push Toivo ya Toivo intolerably around. Andimba unleashed a hard open-hand smack on the young warder's cheek, sending [his] cap flying and the young warder wailing 'Die kaffer het my geslaan'" [The nigger beat me]

Later during his prison term Ya Toivo was transferred to Section D where other anti-apartheid activists were serving their sentences. He met Nelson Mandela there, and the two became personal friends. On 1 March 1984, Toivo was released from Robben Island, having served 16 of his 20 years. Of all his fellow Namibian guerrillas he was serving the longest sentence on the notorious Robben Island prison. Nevertheless, on his day of release he had to be lured out of his cell, not happy to have gained freedom by himself with many comrades still behind bars. After a brief stay in Windhoek he left for Lusaka to rejoin his comrades in exile. He subsequently became a member of the SWAPO Central Committee and Politburo and was elected SWAPO Secretary General in 1984.

== After independence ==
From 1984 to 1991, he was the secretary general of the South West Africa People's Organization (SWAPO). In the advent of Namibia's independence, a showdown was expected between Sam Nujoma, who had spent many years in exile, and Toivo, incarcerated at Robben Island. Toivo avoided this conflict, "settling" for the post of Minister of Mines and Energy, leaving Nujoma the presidency.

Toivo was a SWAPO member of the Constituent Assembly, which was in place from November 1989 to March 1990, immediately prior to independence, and upon independence in March 1990 he became a member of the National Assembly. He was also Minister of Mines and Energy from 1990 until his appointment as Minister of Labour on 26 March 1999. After over three years in that position, he was appointed as Minister of Prisons and Correctional Services on 27 August 2002, switching posts with Marco Hausiku. He remained Minister of Prisons for the remainder of the legislative period but chose not to run for a seat in the National Assembly again at the time of the 2004 election, saying that he had "done enough".

Toivo received the eleventh-most votes (358) in the election to the central committee of SWAPO at the party's August 2002 congress. At SWAPO's November 2007 congress, Toivo failed to be elected to the SWAPO politburo for the first time in the party's history. This was attributed to Toivo's purported link to the opposition Rally for Democracy and Progress (RDP), a party that had been founded as a split from SWAPO shortly before the congress. Toivo denied being linked to the RDP, but the claim was believed to have influenced the vote.

At the SWAPO Congress on 2 December 2012, Andimba ya Toivo was elected as a permanent member of the central committee.

== Personal life ==
After retiring from active politics, Toivo devoted his time to his wife, Vicki Erenstein, an American labor lawyer, and two daughters, Mutaleni and Nashikoto, and ran various businesses. He died on the evening of 9 June 2017 at his home in Windhoek at the age of 92 years. Ya Toivo was laid to rest at Heroes' Acre in Windhoek on 24 June 2017.

== Awards and honours ==
Ya Toivo was declared a national hero of Namibia and accorded a state funeral in Windhoek's Heroes' Acre. Some of the various other honours bestowed upon him are:

- Grand Companion of OR Tambo in Silver, awarded in 2009 for "his courageous contribution to the fight for independence and freedom in South Africa and Namibia"
- In 2014 an honorary doctorate in civil law from the International University of Management, Namibia

Several entities in Namibia have been named after ya Toivo, among them:

- Andimba Toivo ya Toivo Airport, formerly Ondangwa Airport
- HMS Challenger, a ship renamed as MV Ya Toivo after him
- Andimba Toivo ya Toivo Senior Secondary School
- The St Mary's Mission School dining hall in Odibo
