= Where Others Wavered =

2001 autobiography by Sam Nujoma

- Cover art for Where Others Wavered
- Author: Sam Nujoma
- Language: English
- Subject: Autobiography
- Genre: Non-fiction
- Publication date: 2001
- Media type: Print (Paperback)
- Pages: 496 pp
- ISBN: 0-901787-58-2
- OCLC: 47782955

Where Others Wavered: The Autobiography of Sam Nujoma. My Life in SWAPO and My Participation in the Liberation Struggle of Namibia, commonly known as Where Others Wavered, is an autobiographical work written by Sam Nujoma and published by Panaf Books in 2001. The text describes his life, from his childhood through his beginnings with SWAPO, exile in Angola and Zambia, as well as part of his presidency.

Nujoma was the leader of the South West Africa People's Organization (SWAPO) from its founding in 1960 until retirement in 2007 as well as being the first President of Namibia from election in 1990 until 2005.

== See also ==
- Namibia: The Struggle for Liberation (2007)
