= Usutuaije Maamberua =

Namibian politician

Usutuaije Maamberua (born 5 August 1957) is a Namibian politician. He was the president of the South West Africa National Union (SWANU) from 2007 until 2017. Maamberua has served in the National Assembly of Namibia since 2010.

== Early life and education ==
Born in 1957 in Tsumeb, Maamberua earned three Master of Arts degrees (from the University of Namibia, Heriot-Watt University and the University of Southampton) and one Ph.D. (University of the Witwatersrand) in business and economics related fields.

== Politics ==
An accountant by training, Maamberua worked as the permanent secretary of the Ministry of Finance from 1997. In 2003, he was demoted to the Ministry of Prisons and Correctional Services. Shortly after receiving the demotion, Maamberua resigned to pursue other career opportunities. He became head of the accounting department at the University of Namibia in 2007.

Maamberua was elected to the National Assembly in the November 2009 general election. Meanwhile, as SWANU's presidential candidate, Maamberua received 2,968 votes, which placed him eighth out of twelve candidates. He was re-elected to the National Assembly in the November 2014 parliamentary election; he was again the only SWANU candidate to win a seat.
