= Orlando Pirates S.C. =

Namibian football club

Orlando Pirates SC
- Full name: Orlando Pirates Sport Club
- Nicknames: Buccaneers; Sea Robbers
- Founded: April 1963; 63 years ago
- Ground: Sam Nujoma Stadium, Windhoek
- Capacity: 10,300
- Chairman: Axab Auchamp
- Manager: Ivan Namaseb
- League: Namibia Premiership
Home colours	Away colours

Orlando Pirates Sport Club are a professional Namibian football club from Katutura, Windhoek. They play in the country's highest division, the Namibia Premier Football League.

The club was founded in April 1963 by three childhood friends, including former Namibian footballer Ismael Narib.

== Achievements ==
- Namibia Premier League: 2

1990, 2008

- NFA-Cup: 3

2002, 2006, 2009

== Crest ==
Present logo

== Coaches ==
- Ali Akan
- Woody Jacobs
- Eric Muinjo - 2018/19 Season - Nov 2018 - Jan 2019
- Lucky Kakuva - 2018/19 Season - Present
