= Fanuel Kozonguizi =

Namibian lawyer and politician

National Ombudsman
- In office 1990–1995
- President: Sam Nujoma

South West Africa Transitional Government Minister of Information
- In office 1988–1989

South West Africa Transitional Government Minister of Justice, Information, Post and Telecommunication
- In office 1985–1988

Administrator-General of South West Africa
- In office 1980–1982

President of South West Africa National Union
- In office 1959–1966

Personal details
- Born: Fanuel Jariretundu Kozonguizi; 26 January 1932 Windhoek, South West Africa
- Died: 1 February 1995 (aged 63) Windhoek, Namibia
- Party: SWANU, DTA

Fanuel Jariretundu Kozonguizi (26 January 1932 - 1 February 1995) was a Namibian politician, diplomat, and lawyer who played a significant role during the Namibian War of Independence as a petitioner. In 1959, Kozonguizi co-founded and became the first president of the South West Africa National Union (SWANU), Namibia's first political party.

In the 1960s, Kozonguizi served as a permanent petitioner to the United Nations on behalf of the Herero Chiefs' Council. He was among the first Namibian nationalists to present the case for Namibia's self-determination at the UN. He remained in exile for several years and returned to Namibia to take part in the Transitional Government of National Unity in the 1980s. Prior to Namibia's independence, Kozonguizi held high-ranking administrative positions in the then South West Africa under the South African apartheid administration, and during the Transitional Government.

Following independence, he served as a member of Parliament and was appointed Namibia's first Ombudsman. In 1993, he was appointed the United Nations Independent Expert on Somalia, a position he held until 1994. Kozonguizi died on 1 February 1995, leaving behind a legacy of dedication to justice and the pursuit of Namibian independence.

== Early life ==
Kozonguizi was born on 26 January 1932 in Windhoek, Namibia, and grew up in Warmbad. He completed high school in South Africa and earned his matric in 1953. He studied at University of Fort Hare, Rhodes University, and University of Cape Town. He became a barrister and Inner Temple member in London in 1970.

== Political career ==
Kozonguizi began his career as an activist working to support contract labourers returning to Ovamboland in 1954. In that year, he, Mburumba Kerina, and Zedekia Ngavirue formed the South West Africa Students Organization at the University of Fort Hare.

On 2 August 1957, he was among the founding members of the Ovamboland People's Congress (OPC), launched in Cape Town by Andimba Toivo ya Toivo. In 1959, he was elected the first President of SWANU, which was the first political party in Namibian history. He lasted as SWANU's leader until 1966, when Kozonguizi stressed an ideologically pure commitment to socialism and anti-imperialism which made SWANU unpopular to some in comparison to the other major political party and liberation movement, the South West Africa People's Organization (SWAPO). This also led to the 1968 derecognition of SWANU by the Organization of African Unity.

After serving as a lawyer in London for a short time, Kozonguizi returned to Namibia in 1976 as legal advisor to Clemens Kapuuo and the OvaHerero delegation at the Turnhalle Constitutional Conference becoming an advocate in the process. He subsequently joined Kapuuo as member of the Democratic Turnhalle Alliance (DTA). He was appointed into a position at the Office of the Administrator-General in 1980, becoming "the highest-ranking black Namibian in the colonial government."

From 1980 until independence, Kozonguizi served in the transitional government of Namibia in various positions, including as the Minister of Justice, Information, Post and Telecommunication from June 1985 to 1988, and as Minister of Information from 1988 to 1989. Kozonguizi joined the National Unity Democratic Organisation (NUDO), a party that was part of the DTA at that time. Upon independence in 1990, he was elected into the 1st National Assembly of Namibia on a DTA ticket. He served as national ombudsman until his death in February 1995 at the age of 63.
