= Hans Beukes =

Namibian writer and political activist

Hans Beukes is a Namibian writer and former activist. He left South Africa, where he was a student at University of Cape Town (UCT), in 1959, to appear at the UN as a petitioner on the South West Africa issue. To leave, Beukes had to be smuggled out of South Africa in a Volkswagen Beetle. Beukes later earned a scholarship to study in Norway, where he still lived as of 2010. He only returned to Namibia briefly prior to independence in 1989.

Beukes is the Scandinavian correspondent for the Cape Town-based newspaper Die Burger. He published his memoirs, Long Road to Liberation. An Exiled Namibian Activist's Perspective, in 2014.
