= Michael Scott (priest) =

English Anglican priest (1907–1983)

The Reverend Michael Scott
- Born: Guthrie Michael Scott; 30 July 1907; Lowfield Heath, Sussex, England
- Died: 14 September 1983 (aged 76)
- Parent(s): Perceval Caleb Scott and Ethel Maud Scott

Ecclesiastical career
- Religion: Christianity (Anglican)
- Church: Church of England
- Ordained: 1930 (as a deacon); 1932 (as a priest)

Guthrie Michael Scott (30 July 1907 – 14 September 1983) was an English Anglican priest and anti-apartheid activist. Working in South Africa from the 1940s, he campaigned against racially discriminatory laws and the apartheid system. He helped to support Namibian independence and to resist South African control of South West Africa, raising awareness internationally and becoming a spokesperson for South West African people at the United Nations, over a number of decades.

Scott co-founded the Africa Bureau with David Astor and Mary Benson, creating awareness of issues impacting Africa, and of apartheid in South Africa. He was an early advocate of nuclear disarmament, addressing the UN and co-ordinating protest activities to try and stop France testing nuclear weapons in the Sahara. He tried to help Naga nationalists with their objective of becoming independent from India, successfully contributing to negotiating a ceasefire, with the Indian government later accusing him of internationalising the matter and ending their dealings with him. He also co-founded the Committee of 100 and was involved in the ban the bomb movement. A controversial figure and campaigner, Scott was involved in a number of demonstrations, was imprisoned in South Africa and Britain, had his clerical licence withdrawn twice, and was banned from entering South Africa and deported from India. Kenneth Kaunda honoured Scott, and Archbishop Desmond Tutu paid tribute to Scott for the solidarity he showed towards poor and mis-treated African people.

== Life ==
The son of Ethel Maud Scott (née Burn) and her husband, Anglican priest Perceval Caleb Scott, Michael was born on 30 July 1907 in Lowfield Heath, Sussex, the youngest of three sons. During his early schooling, Scott was a victim of sexual abuse. He later studied at King's College, in Taunton, where he performed well and gained a place at Cambridge University to study medicine. However, illness thwarted these plans in 1926 when he required gall-bladder surgery and was found to have tuberculosis. He travelled to Leysin, Switzerland, to recuperate before accepting an invitation from the Archdeacon of Cape Town to go to South Africa. There he worked with people with leprosy in Faure, near Stellenbosch, and also studied at St Paul's Theological College in Makhanda.

Scott returned to the UK in 1929 and became a student at Chichester Theological College in Sussex. George Bell ordained him deacon in 1930, and he was ordained priest in 1932. He served curacies in Slaugham and Kensington. Whilst based at All Souls in Lower Clapton, in 1934, he became more involved in political matters during the hunger marches. He was domestic chaplain to the Bishop of Bombay from 1935 to 1937. Scott then served at St Paul's Cathedral, Calcutta, during Mahatma Gandhi's non-violent campaign against British rule.

In the 1930s Scott also began sympathising with the Communist Party due to the rise of the British Union of Fascists. He became a communist agent whilst in India, but he later disassociated himself from this affiliation because of the Nazi-Soviet Non-aggression pact. At the beginning of World War II he returned to the UK, and in 1940 he joined the RAF but left in 1941 after being diagnosed with Crohn's disease.

=== Apartheid and South West Africa ===
In 1943 Scott moved to Johannesburg where he was chaplain to the St Alban's Mission, and took a leading role in a lobbying organisation called the Campaign for Rights and Justice that sought social change, racial equality, and fairer land distribution. In 1946, after taking part in an Indian protest against the Asiatic Land Tenure and Indian Representation Act, he became the first white man to be jailed for resisting the country's discriminatory laws. As a result of his imprisonment his parish licence was terminated by Bishop Geoffrey Clayton. Trevor Huddleston acknowledged that Scott was a decade ahead in "vision and achievement." He began living in a shanty town, outside Johannesburg, where he was prosecuted again, this time for living in an area with African residents. During this time many oppressed groups began seeking his help and he started to investigate how black farming workers were being mistreated.

Scott was a leading international supporter of Namibian independence and opponent of Prime Minister Jan Smuts' attempts to annex South West Africa when the League of Nations was dissolved after World War II. Along with Chief Hosea Kutako and Captain Hendrik Samuel Witbooi, he addressed and petitioned the United Nations, helping to raise awareness internationally. India and New Zealand had objected to the annexation, leading to Smuts presenting a report to the UN, and the results of a referendum that showed that white and black inhabitants supported the annexation. These referendum results were disputed by the Anti-Slavery and Aborigines Protective Society based in Cape Town, who raised concerns with the NAACP, whilst Herero Chief Frederick Mahareru contacted Scott.

The Herero people sold cattle to fund his trip to the UN in New York, whilst the NAACP and other organisations raised objections when his request for a visa was declined, which the Indian delegation helped to resolve. With the assistance of a number of NGOs, he became a spokesperson for the Herero and other South West African people at the UN in 1947, due to them being prevented from attending, and again in 1949, after the National Party gained control led by Daniel Malan, and introduced apartheid and the South West Africa Act that connected South West Africa with South Africa. His testimony contributed to the question of South West Africa being referred to the International Court of Justice, which gave an advisory opinion in 1950. It also prompted anti-apartheid commentary in the media, with the News Chronicle suggesting that Scott had "transformed the atmosphere of debate from arid legal dispute into a moral assize to which black victims have at last contributed their own evidence".

His general licence was revoked by Bishop Richard Ambrose Reeves due to him travelling, although he later obtained one again from George Bell. Scott continued to attend UN sessions in the 1950s and in subsequent decades regarding Namibian independence, and from the mid 1950s he attended with Namibians including Mburumba Kerina and Fanuel Kozonguizi who were able to appear before the UN directly. He also helped Sam Nujoma petition the UN in 1973, which resulted in the general assembly recognizing SWAPO as the rightful representatives of the Namibian people.

=== Africa Bureau and anti-colonialism ===
Barred from re-entering South Africa, Scott moved to London in 1950. In 1952, he co-founded the Africa Bureau with David Astor, the editor of the Observer, as an organisation to advise and support Africans who wished to oppose, by constitutional means, decisions imposed on them by alien governments. Mary Benson, who assisted Scott during the 1950s, also helped to found the Africa Bureau.

The Bureau published a bi-monthly journal covering opinions and events called Africa Digest, and a monthly newsletter about apartheid called What's Happening in South Africa. Based in Denison House at 296 Vauxhall Bridge Road, the Bureau was described in Africa Today as a leading subject matter organisation that had a number of affiliations, including with the African Development Trust, African Educational Trust, and the Anti-Slavery Society for the Protection of Human Rights, of which Scott was a director. He met Martin Luther King Jr. during Ghana's celebration of independence in 1957, and joined the later celebrations of independence in Tanzania and Zambia. In 1958, Scott wrote an autobiography entitled A Time to Speak, which was published by Faber and Faber in the UK and Doubleday in the US.

=== Nuclear disarmament ===
He petitioned the UN in 1959 on behalf of anti-nuclear activists who were working with Kwame Nkrumah to stop France from testing nuclear weapons in Algeria. Scott the UN that "the testing of nuclear weapons anywhere, by any power, is a crime and a tragedy" and warned that this would worsen relations between white and black people. He stated that tests would be deemed as "Europeans treating Non-Europeans as less than human beings." He was a member of the Sahara Protest Team that included Ntsu Mokhehle, Michael Randle, Bayard Rustin and others, who travelled overland in an attempt to stop the tests by direct action, but they were intercepted by French soldiers. France carried out the first of 17 nuclear tests in Algeria on 13 February 1960; with four being detonated during the Algerian War of Independence.

With his friend, the philosopher Bertrand Russell, he co-founded the Committee of 100, which campaigned for nuclear disarmament and organised demonstrations to support these aims. In the early 1960s, Bertrand Russell and Scott were sentenced to prison at Bow Street Magistrates' Court for their involvement in coordinating ban the bomb protests. Both men signed an agreement to convene a convention for drafting a world constitution. As a result, a World Constituent Assembly later convened to draft and adopt the Constitution for the Federation of Earth.

=== Naga ceasefire ===
The Naga people sought his assistance in their struggle for independence, with Scott helping in a peacekeeping capacity into the 1960s, with Scott acting as a negotiator between Naga nationalists, including Angami Zapu Phizo, and Indian Prime Minister Jawaharlal Nehru. A ceasefire was agreed to in 1964 and adhered to for eight years (albeit with both sides accusing the other of violating it), but both the Indian press and parliament called for Scott to be removed from the country. His action of writing to the UN was viewed as antagonistic by the Indian government, who accused him of internationalising the issue and eventually deported him in 1966. In the early 1960s he had formed a World Peace Brigade with Jayaprakash Narayan and A. J. Muste, sponsored by Julius Nyerere and Kenneth Kaunda, that used non-violent protest and other peaceful tactics to support African liberation efforts, with the group involved in trying to help to find a solution between the Indian government and Naga people.

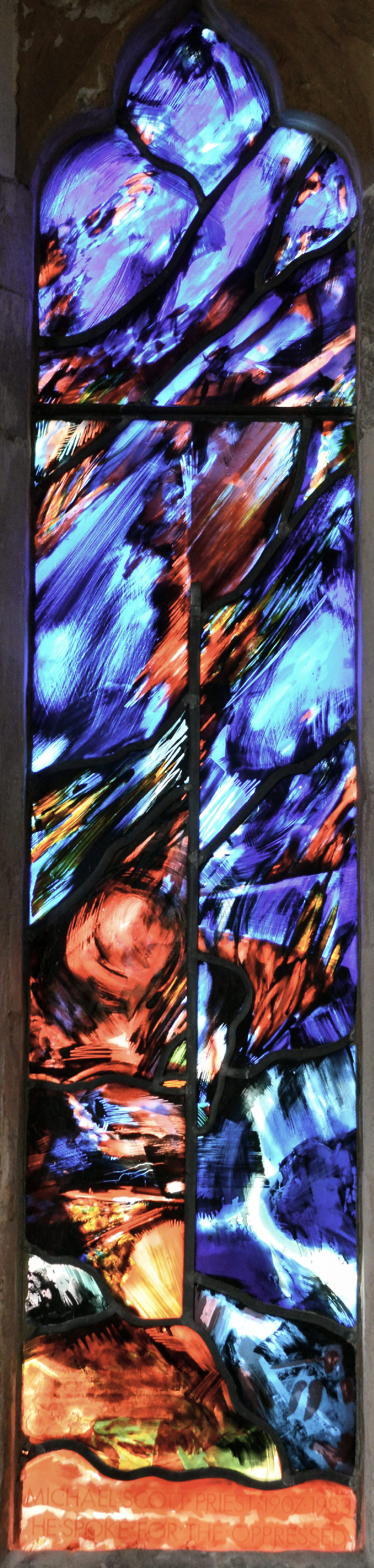
Michael Scott window in St. Pancras Church

=== Personal life and controversy ===
Following a tradition in Parson's Pleasure for nude sunbathing, Scott was caught by police in 1955 and charged with indecent exposure. He had relationships with at least two women, one of whom was his collaborator Mary Benson.

=== Later life and death ===
He continued to campaign for refugees, equality, justice and human rights throughout the 1970s, and made his last appearance at the UN in 1982. He died on 14 September 1983, after being diagnosed with liver cancer.

== Honours and tributes ==
Zambian president Kenneth Kaunda honoured Scott, making him a Grand Officer of the Order of the Grand Companion of Freedom. Scott was given an Honorary Doctorate in Theology by the General Theological Seminary in 1972. He was also made an honorary canon of St George's Cathedral, Windhoek in 1975. A major street in Windhoek is named in his honour.

David Astor described Scott as one of three truly heroic people he had known in his life. There is a memorial window dedicated to him by Archbishop Desmond Tutu at St Pancras Church, Kingston near Lewes. In his forward to Anne Yates and Lewis Chester's 2006 biography The Troublemaker, Tutu wrote that "I was among the many in the black community who held him in a very high regard for what we considered a conspicuous act of solidarity with the poor and downtrodden of our land."
