= Old Location =

Historical segregated area for black residents of Windhoek, Namibia

Coordinates: 22.579873°S 17.062798°E

Windhoek's Old Location in the 1950s

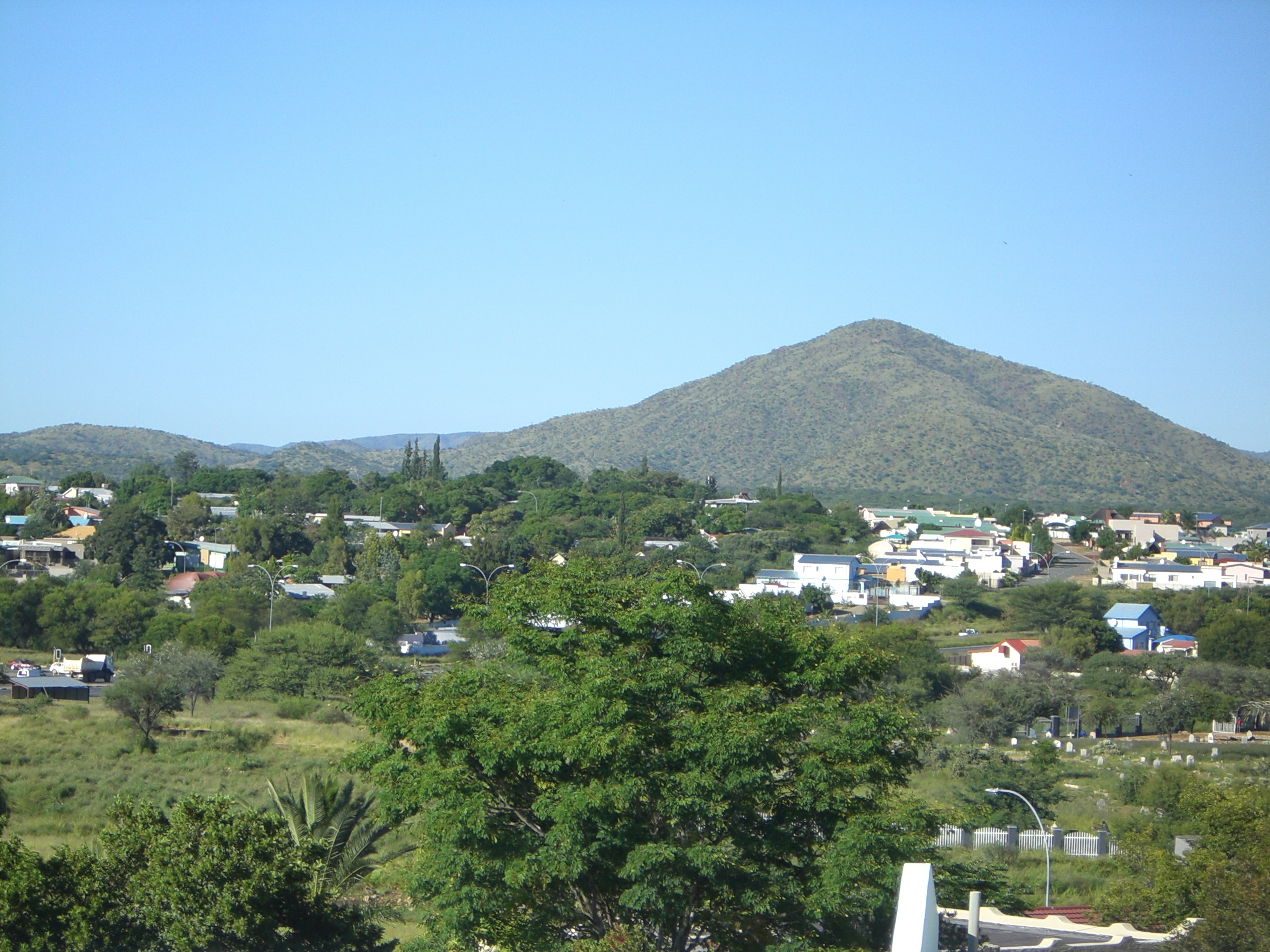
The same skyline in 2011, showing the Old Location Cemetery Museum (lower right corner) and parts of the suburb Pionierspark

The Old Location (or as it was known then the Main Location) was an area segregated for Black residents of Windhoek, the capital of Namibia. It was situated in the area between today's suburbs of Hochland Park and Pioneers Park.

== History ==
Upon the creation of the neighborhood in 1912 by the Windhoek City Council, all Black residents of other areas of the city were moved to the Main Location. A year later, streets were laid out and the separation of Black ethnic groups took place, with each ethnic group forced to live in a different section. Administration of the area was split between Black local residents and White residents from elsewhere.

The suburb contained the St Barnabas Anglican Church School, a school that was attended by a number of pupils that later became notable, including Clemens Kapuuo, Sam Nujoma, Mburumba Kerina, Tjama Tjivikua and Kuaima Riruako. The school was destroyed when Old Location was closed for Blacks.

== Old Location uprising ==
=== Background ===
After World War I, the League of Nations gave South West Africa, formerly a German colony, to the United Kingdom as a mandate under the title of South Africa. When the National Party won the 1948 election in South Africa and subsequently introduced apartheid legislation, these laws also extended to South West Africa, which was the de facto fifth province of South Africa.

During the 1950s, the Windhoek municipality and the South African colonial administration decided to forcibly move the residents of the Main Location 8 kilometres (5.0 miles) to the north of the city, prompting the evicted people to give the new location the name Katutura (Otjiherero: The place where we do not want to live).

For a number of reasons most residents did not want to move: They had owned the erven in Old Location whereas in Katutura all land belonged to the municipality. The newly allocated erven were also a lot smaller than those in Old Location, effectively forbidding the creation of gardens. Also, black residents were worse off economically after the move because they now had to pay rent to the municipality, and they needed a bus to reach their workplaces in town—Old Location had been at a walking distance.

=== Old Location, Windhoek massacre ===
The newly established SWANU party, in one of their first mass actions, organised the protest of the inhabitants which came to a head on 10 December 1959. Following protests and an effective boycott of municipal services by Main Location residents, the police opened fire on the protesters, killing 11 and wounding 44 others. Doctors at the hospitals in Windhoek refused to treat the wounded, telling them to "go to the United Nations for treatment because these people ... [are] political patients". Although this claim is backed by many eyewitnesses, among them Sam Nujoma, Namibia's founding president who references the incident in his autobiography Where Others Wavered, it has not been unchallenged. Hannes Smith caused a controversy in 2003, calling it a "gross lie".

3,000-4,000 residents fled the area and refused to return, fearing police reprisals. The Old Location Uprising, as it came to be known, was a rallying cry for Namibian independence until the country received independence in March 1990, 31 years later. It was one of the events leading to the foundation of SWAPO by forcing community leaders from the Ovamboland People's Organization into exile, including Sam Nujoma. It is also probably one of the main reasons for SWAPO to put less effort into petitioning and resistance, and to turn the independence struggle into an armed conflict.

The Old Location uprising is the reason for the declaration of December 10, Human Rights Day, as a Namibian national holiday.

== Transfer to Katutura ==
The transfer to the Katutura suburb took several years. In 1962, approximately 7,000 people had been moved, joining the 2,000 people of Ovambo descent that already lived there.

In 1968, the Old Location was officially closed and Whites began to settle.

== Notable residents ==
- Joseph Obgeb Jimmy, diplomat
- Anna Mungunda, National Hero of Namibia, a domestic worker killed in the uprising of 1959
- Ismael Narib, footballer

== Bibliography ==
- Henning Melber (2016). "Revisiting the Windhoek Old Location". BAB Working Papers (3). Basel Africa Bibliography. ISSN 1422-8769.
