= Sam Nujoma =

President of Namibia from 1990 to 2005

His Excellency Sam Nujoma
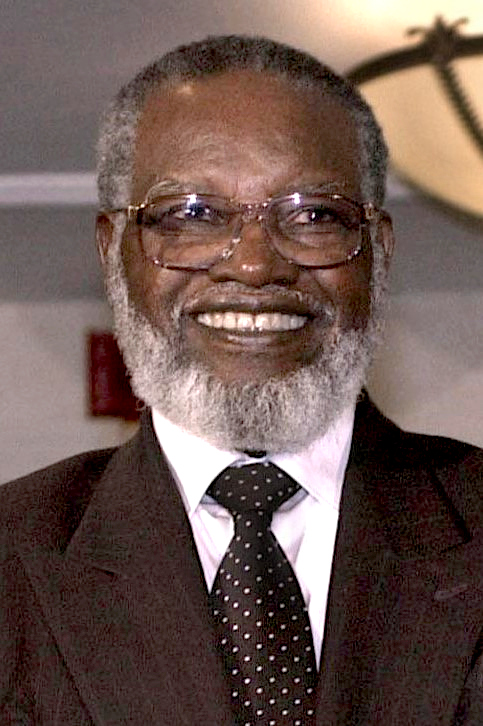
- Nujoma in 2004

1st President of Namibia
- In office 21 March 1990 – 21 March 2005
- Prime Minister: Hage Geingob (1990–2002); Theo-Ben Gurirab (2002–2005)
- Preceded by: Office established
- Succeeded by: Hifikepunye Pohamba

President of SWAPO
- In office 19 April 1960 – 29 November 2007
- Preceded by: Office established
- Succeeded by: Hifikepunye Pohamba

President of OPO
- In office 19 April 1959 – 19 April 1960
- Preceded by: Office established
- Succeeded by: Office abolished

Personal details
- Born: Samuel Shafiishuna Daniel Nujoma; 12 May 1929 Ovamboland, South West Africa
- Died: 8 February 2025 (aged 95) Windhoek, Khomas Region, Namibia
- Resting place: Heroes' Acre, Windhoek, Namibia
- Party: SWAPO; OPO
- Spouse: Kovambo Nujoma (m. 1956)
- Children: 4, including Utoni
- Education: University of Namibia
- Religion: Lutheran
- Website: www.samnujomafoundation.org

Samuel Shafiishuna Daniel Nujoma (Note: /nuːˈjoʊmə/ noo-YOH-mə) (12 May 1929 – 8 February 2025) was a Namibian revolutionary, anti-apartheid activist and politician who served three terms as the first president of Namibia, from 1990 to 2005. Nujoma was a founding member and the first president of the South West Africa People's Organisation (SWAPO) in 1960.

Nujoma became involved in anti-colonial politics during the 1950s. In 1959, he co-founded and served as the first president of the Ovamboland People's Organization (OPO), a nationalist organization advocating for an independent Namibia. In December 1958, he was an organizer of the Old Location resistance and was arrested and deported to Ovamboland. In 1960, he escaped and went into exile in Tanzania, where he was welcomed by Julius Nyerere.

Nujoma played an important role as the leader of the national liberation movement in campaigning for Namibia's political independence from South African rule. The OPO was renamed SWAPO in 1960. Nujoma established the People's Liberation Army of Namibia (PLAN) in 1962 and launched a guerrilla war against the apartheid government of South Africa in August 1966 at Omugulugwombashe after the United Nations withdrew the mandate for South Africa to govern the territory. Nujoma led SWAPO during the lengthy Namibian War of Independence, which lasted from 1966 to 1989.

Namibia achieved independence from South Africa in 1990 and held its first democratic elections the same year. SWAPO won a majority, and Nujoma was sworn in as the country's first president on 21 March 1990. He was re-elected for two more terms in 1994 and 1999. Nujoma retired as SWAPO party president on 30 November 2007.

Nujoma published his autobiography, Where Others Wavered in 2001. He received multiple honours and awards for his leadership, including the Lenin Peace Prize and the Indira Gandhi Peace Prize. The Parliament of Namibia conferred on him the titles "Founding President of the Republic of Namibia" and "Father of the Namibian Nation". In 2007, SWAPO named him "Leader of the Namibian Revolution".

== Early life ==
Samuel Shafiishuna Daniel Nujoma was born at Etunda, a village in Ongandjera, near Okahao, Ovamboland, South West Africa, on 12 May 1929. Nujoma was born to Helvi Mpingana Kondombolo (1898–2008) and Daniel Uutoni Nujoma (1893–1968). His mother, Helvi, was a Uukwambi princess by descent, and this fact would later reinforce Nujoma's charismatic influence during his political career. He was the eldest of his parents' eleven children.

Nujoma spent much of his early childhood looking after his siblings and tending to the family's cattle and traditional farming activities. His educational opportunities were limited. He started attending a Finnish missionary school at Okahao when he was ten and completed Standard Six, which was as high as possible for blacks during the time. In 1946, at age 17, he moved to Walvis Bay to live with his aunt, where he began his first employment at a general store for a monthly salary of 10 shillings. He later worked at a whaling station. While there, he was exposed to world politics by meeting soldiers from Argentina, Norway, and other parts of Europe who had come during World War II.

In 1949, Nujoma moved to Windhoek, where he started work as a cleaner for South African Railways (SAR) while attending adult night school at St Barnabas Anglican Church School in the Windhoek Old Location, mainly to improve his English. He further studied for his Junior Certificate through correspondence at the Trans‐Africa Correspondence College in South Africa.

== Political career ==
During World War I, South Africa had defeated the German colonial forces in South West Africa and established martial law in the colony after making a peace treaty in July 1915. After the war, the League of Nations officially assigned the former German colony to the United Kingdom as a mandate under the administration of South Africa. When the National Party won the 1948 election in South Africa, it passed laws establishing racial segregation known as apartheid. It applied these laws to South West Africa as well, which it governed as the de facto fifth province of South Africa.

Nujoma became involved in politics in the early 1950s through trade unions. Nujoma's political outlook was shaped by his work experiences, his awareness of the contract labour system, and his increasing knowledge of the independence campaigns across Africa. As a result of this activity, he was dismissed from SAR in 1957. In 1957, a group of Namibians working in Cape Town, led by Andimba Toivo ya Toivo, formed the Ovamboland People's Congress (OPC). OPC was opposed to South African policies in South West Africa, including the inhumane contract labour system under which people were forced to work for meager wages. Nujoma had become friends with Toivo, and in 1959, he joined with OPC cofounder Jacob Kuhangua to start the Windhoek branch of the organisation, which had by then been renamed the Ovamboland People's Organization (OPO). At its first congress, Nujoma was elected president. During the next year, he travelled to Namibia in secret, mobilizing and setting up branch structures of OPO. In September 1959, the South West African National Union (SWANU) was formed as an umbrella body for anti-colonial resistance groups. Nujoma joined its executive committee representing OPO.

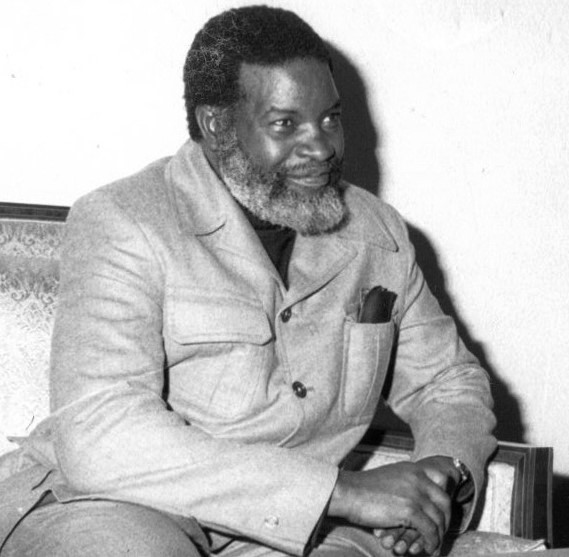
Nujoma pictured in 1979

After the Old Location Massacre in December 1959, Nujoma was arrested and charged for organizing the resistance and faced threats of deportation to the north of the country. He was released after one week in custody. By the directive of OPO leadership and in collaboration with the Herero Chiefs' Council under the leadership of Chief Hosea Kutako, it was decided that Nujoma join the other Namibians in exile who were lobbying the United Nations on behalf of the anti-colonial cause for Namibia. In 1960, Nujoma petitioned the UN through letters and eventually went into exile in February of that year. He left Namibia on 29 February, crossing into Bechuanaland and from there travelling to Bulawayo in Southern Rhodesia by train. He flew from Bulawayo to Salisbury (now Harare) and on to Ndola in Northern Rhodesia. With the assistance of members of the Northern Rhodesian United National Independence Party (UNIP) he crossed into the Belgian Congo's Katanga Province. There Nujoma met Moise Tshombe from the Conakat Party of Congolese. Crossing back over the border to Ndola, he boarded a flight to Mbeya. In Mbeya, he was treated for malaria and escaped from the hospital after being threatened with arrest by the colonial authorities. From Mbeya, Nujoma travelled with the assistance of officials of the Tanganyika African National Union (TANU) via Njombe, Iringa, and Dodoma to Dar-Es-Salaam. With the assistance of Julius Nyerere, then president of TANU, he received a passport. While in Tanganyika, he received permission to address the UN Committee on South West Africa in New York. In April 1960, Nujoma travelled from Tanganyika to Khartoum, Sudan, and from there to Accra, Ghana, where he attended the All-African Peoples' Conference organized by Kwame Nkrumah against the French atom bomb test in the Sahara Desert. Nujoma met with other African nationalist leaders such as Patrice Lumumba, Gamal Abdel Nasser, Joseph Kasa-Vubu, and Frantz Fanon at the conference. His early encounters with other African nationalist leaders left a lasting impression and informed his Pan-African outlook. Kwame Nkrumah assisted Nujoma to travel to the United States and later to Liberia, where a case on South West Africa was being presented to the International Court of Justice.

After breaking away from SWANU, OPO reconstituted itself as the South West Africa People's Organisation (SWAPO) in New York on 19 April 1960, and Nujoma was elected president in absentia. He arrived in New York in June 1960 where he petitioned before the Sub-Committee of the United Nations General Assembly Fourth Committee. Nujoma demanded that South West Africa be given its independence by 1963 at the latest. He then returned to Tanganyika in 1961, from where he and a small group of activists developed SWAPO into an international force. He received support from other African nationalists and received strong backing from Julius Nyerere. Nujoma established SWAPO's provisional headquarters in Dar es Salaam and arranged scholarships and military training for Namibians who had started to join him there.

In 1962, SWAPO founded its armed wing, the South West African Liberation Army (SWALA), later renamed the People's Liberation Army of Namibia (PLAN). Nujoma himself procured the first weapons from Algeria via Egypt, Sudan, Tanzania, and Zambia, from where they were taken to Omugulugwombashe in Ovamboland. Nujoma continued his diplomatic rounds as SWAPO set up offices across Africa, Europe, and the Americas. He represented SWAPO at the founding of the Non-Aligned Movement on 1 September 1961 in Belgrade, Yugoslavia, as well as at the founding of the Organisation of African Unity (OAU) in Addis Ababa, Ethiopia, on 25 May 1963. In 1965, the OAU recognized SWAPO as the only lawful representative of the Namibian people. On 21 March 1966, in a bid to test South Africa's claims at the International Court of Justice at the Hague that Namibians in exile were free to return and its assertion that they were in self-imposed exile, Nujoma, accompanied by Hifikepunye Pohamba, chartered a plane to Windhoek. On arrival at the airport, they were arrested and deported to Zambia the next day. On 26 August 1966, the first armed clash between SWALA and the South African security forces took place when paratroopers and police attacked SWALA combatants who had set up a camp at Omugulugwombashe. The attack marked the beginning of the Namibian War of Independence, which would last more than 25 years.

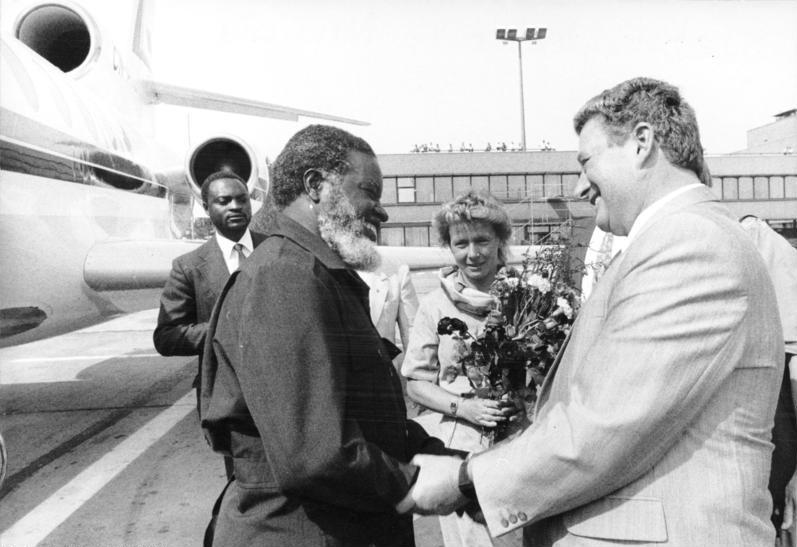
Günter Sieber (right), member of the SED Central Committee and head of the International Relations Department, greets Nujoma on arrival in Berlin, in August 1989. Shikwetepo Haindongo, a representative of SWAPO in East Germany, is at the rear left.

In 1969, Nujoma was reaffirmed as SWAPO President at the Tanga Consultative Conference in Tanzania. In 1974, the Portuguese Empire collapsed, and Namibia's border with Angola became much more susceptible to guerrilla infiltration. Nujoma recognized that this paved the way for major changes in the way the war was being fought, and over the next two years, SWAPO's military campaign shifted its base from Zambia to Angola. The opening of the border enabled thousands of SWAPO supporters to stream out of Namibia to join the movement in exile. Nujoma's son, Utoni Nujoma and his two brothers were among those who arrived in Angola. At the 1977 World Conference Against Apartheid in Lisbon, Nujoma underlined the necessity to destroy the colonial system and institutions of the apartheid regime in Namibia to build those that would serve the interests of people irrespective of race, religion, or origin. He also warned of the danger of the installation of neocolonialist marionettes who would superficially change the visible colonial regime while the position of the majority of people would stay the same. Nujoma led the SWAPO negotiations team between the Western Contact Group (WCG), which consisted of West Germany, Britain, France, the US and Canada, and South Africa on the one hand, and the Frontline States and Nigeria on the other, about proposals that would eventually become United Nations Security Council Resolution 435, passed in September 1978. While the agreement on Resolution 435, which embodied the plan for free and fair elections in Namibia, was undoubtedly a diplomatic coup, its implementation became bogged down for another ten years. South African delaying tactics and the decision by U.S. president Ronald Reagan's administration to link a Cuban withdrawal from Angola to Namibian independence frustrated hopes of an immediate settlement. On 19 March 1989, the signing of the cease-fire agreement with South Africa took place, which resulted in the implementation of Security Council Resolution 435.

After 29 years in exile, Nujoma returned to Namibia in September 1989 to lead SWAPO to victory in the UN-supervised elections that paved the way for independence. Nujoma returned a day before the UN deadline for the Namibian people to register to vote for an election that would draft a constitution when it received its independence from South Africa. The Constituent Assembly, elected in November 1989, chose him as Namibia's first president. Nujoma was sworn in on 21 March 1990, in the presence of Javier Pérez de Cuéllar, Secretary-General of the UN, Frederik de Klerk, president of South Africa, and Nelson Mandela, just released from prison.

== President of SWAPO ==
External image
- Nujoma in the 1960s with Bishop Colin Winter and Shapua Kaukungua. Original source: Namibia State Archive.

In 1959, Nujoma co-founded the Ovamboland People's Organization (OPO) and became its first president. The next year in 1960, he became the first president of the South West Africa People's Organisation (SWAPO). At the time, South Africa administered the land under a policy of apartheid, in which the best resources were reserved for those classified white, while other Namibians were treated as inferior. After years of asking the United Nations to ensure the occupying power in South Africa released control of South West Africa, he authorized armed resistance in 1966. This began the Namibian War of Independence, which lasted 24 years. During the struggle, Nujoma took the combat name Shafiishuna, meaning "lightning", as the name was in his family on his father's side. During the liberation struggle, Nujoma was also the commander-in-chief of the People's Liberation Army of Namibia (PLAN) and the chairman of the Swapo Military Council, which was the biggest decision-making body of PLAN.

Nujoma's role in PLAN has been questioned following allegations of torture and imprisonment of fighters in the Lubango dungeons in Angola. About 1,000 SWAPO members were incarcerated for over nine years in these prisons. Details of what occurred were published in a left-wing journal, Searchlight South Africa, with an interview with two of those who had been kept in pits in poor conditions. It was alleged that Namibian churches participated in a cover-up of the events by the current Namibian government.

After serving 47 years as leader of SWAPO, he was succeeded by Hifikepunye Pohamba in 2007. There was speculation that he would be re-elected as SWAPO leader in 2007 and that he was planning to run for president again in 2009. In early October 2007, however, Nujoma said that he had no intention of seeking re-election as SWAPO president and would stand aside in favour of Pohamba. Pohamba was accordingly elected unopposed as SWAPO president on 29 November 2007 at a party congress. Nujoma said that he was "passing the torch and mantle of leadership to comrade Pohamba". The congress also decided to give Nujoma the title of "Leader of the Namibian Revolution", in addition to his existing title, "Founding Father of the Namibian Nation". Choosing to leave active politics, Nujoma was not re-elected to the SWAPO Central Committee nor the Politburo, but the congress permitted him to attend meetings of the Central Committee and Politburo "at his discretion". The possibility of his receiving the title of National Chairman of SWAPO was also left open.

== President of Namibia ==
As head of SWAPO, Nujoma was unanimously declared president upon the victory of SWAPO in a United Nations-supervised election in 1989 and was sworn in by UN Secretary-General Javier Pérez de Cuéllar on 21 March 1990.

At independence, Namibia was gravely divided as a result of a century of colonialism, dispossession, and racial discrimination, compounded by armed struggle and propaganda. For instance, SWAPO had been so demonized by the colonial media and by official pronouncements that most white people, as well as many members of other groups, regarded the movement with the deepest fear, loathing and suspicion. One of Nujoma's earliest achievements was to proclaim the policy of "national reconciliation", which aimed to improve and harmonise relations amongst Namibia's various racial and ethnic groups. Under his presidency, Namibia made steady if unspectacular economic progress, maintained a democratic system with respect for human rights (in the exception of LGBT rights), observed the rule of law, and worked steadily to eradicate the heritage of apartheid in the interests of developing a non-racial society.

In 1992, Norway decided to stop drought relief to Namibia in response to the purchase of an expensive new presidential jet and two new VIP helicopters. The planes were bought a few weeks after Nujoma had appealed to the international community for drought aid.

In 1990, Nujoma initiated a plan for land reform, in which land would be redistributed from whites to blacks. Some 12% of the total commercial farmland in the country was taken away from white farmers and given to black citizens by 2007. However, according to a 1998 statement made by the Cabinet of Namibia "the agricultural base is too weak to offer a sustainable basis for prosperity" and 38% of Namibia's rural population continues to live beneath the poverty line as of 2010.

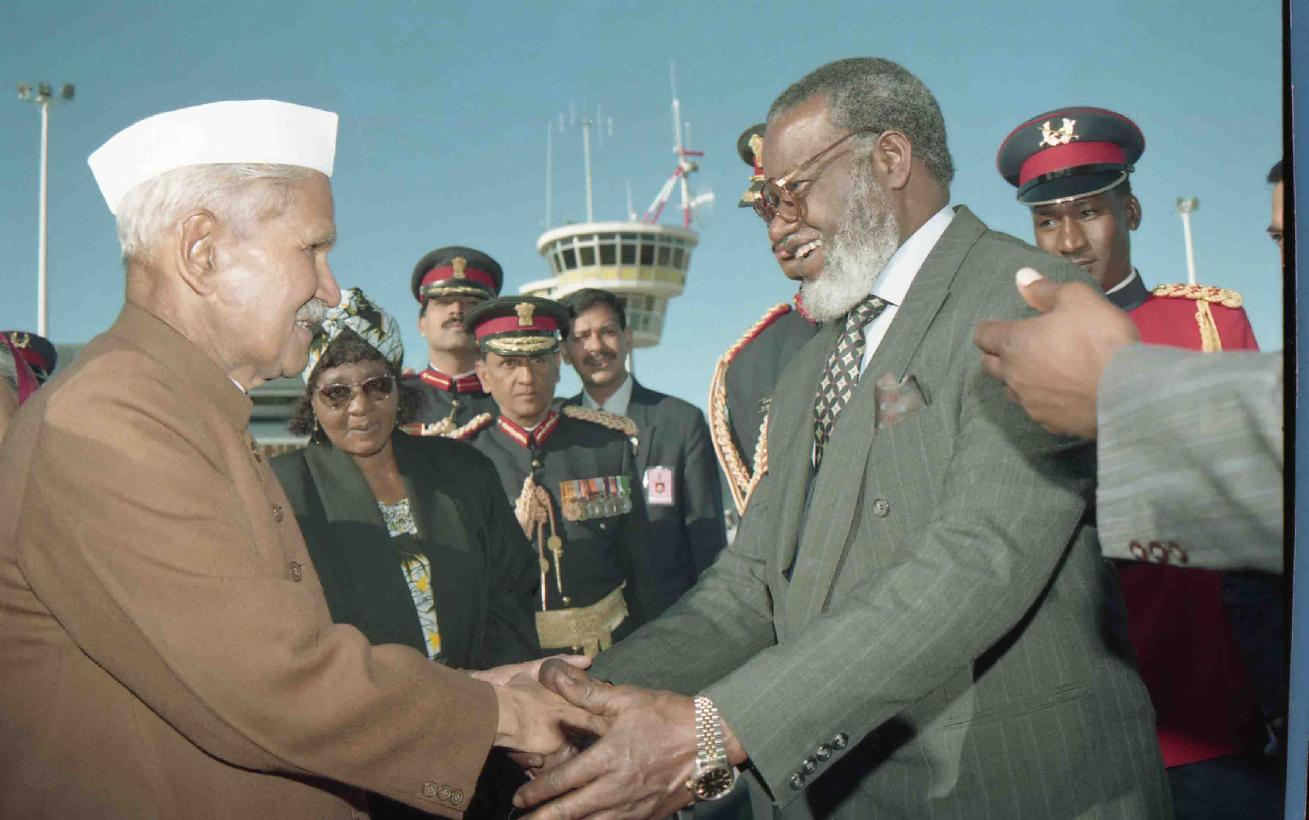
Nujoma with Shankar Dayal Sharma, President of India, in 1995

Nujoma was re-elected as president of Namibia in the December 1994 election with 76.3% of the vote. The constitution of Namibia was changed to allow Nujoma to run for a third five-year term in 1999; this was justified because he had not been directly elected for his first term, and the change applied only to Nujoma. He won the 1999 election with 76.8% of the vote. The constitution did not allow Nujoma to run in November 2004 for a fourth term, and there was not much enthusiasm even within SWAPO to change it again. Hifikepunye Pohamba, described as Nujoma's "hand-picked successor", was elected as the candidate for the presidential election during the SWAPO congress held on 30 May 2004, defeating two other candidates, Nahas Angula and Hidipo Hamutenya. The latter had been dismissed from his post of foreign affairs minister by Nujoma barely two days before the congress. Pohamba was elected with a large majority in the November 2004 election and was sworn in as the second president of Namibia on 21 March 2005.

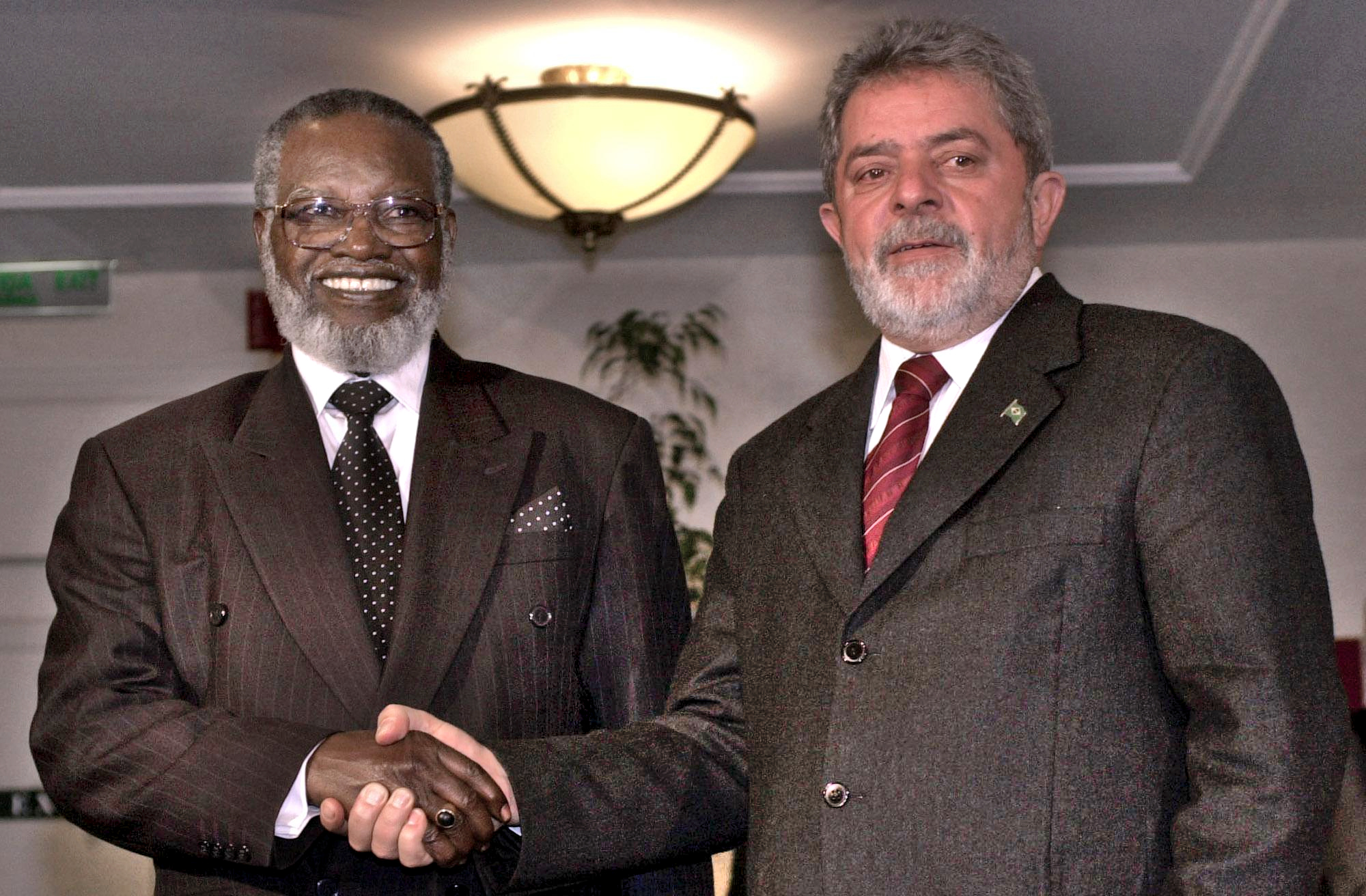
Nujoma with Luiz Inácio Lula da Silva, President of Brazil, in 2004

In 1998, Nujoma came to the defence of the Democratic Republic of Congo President Laurent Kabila when his rule came under threat from rebels backed by Rwanda and Uganda during the Second Congo War. Namibia became involved in the war on behalf of its commitment to the Southern African Development Community (SADC). Namibian, Angolan and Zimbabwean troops helped Kabila fend off the attacks – a move that Nujoma saw as defending the DRC's sovereignty against outside interference. Nujoma also allowed the Angolan military to use Namibian territory to launch attacks on UNITA during the Angolan Civil War, which resulted in UNITA launching cross-border attacks that resulted in civilian deaths. He also oversaw the suppression of the Caprivi conflict in August 1999, during which a state of emergency was declared.

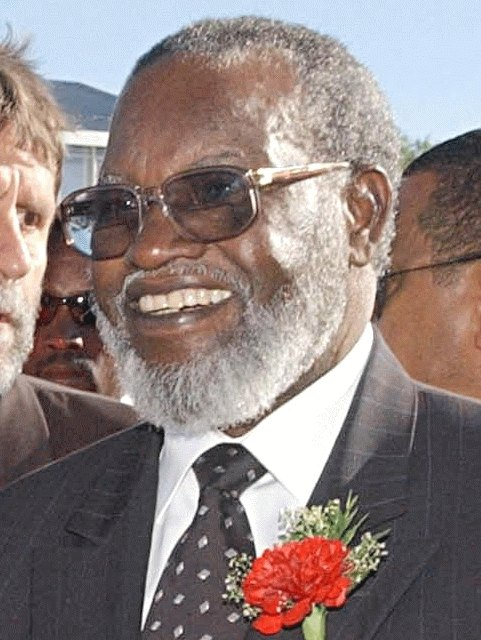
Nujoma in 2003

Nujoma was the international patron and a strong supporter of the Cheetah Conservation Fund, based in Namibia. He was also a supporter of women's and children's rights, having called for fathers to pay for the maintenance of children born out of wedlock. He also opposed the practice of expelling widows from the family home following the deaths of their husbands.

In 2000, alongside President of Finland Tarja Halonen, he co-chaired the United Nations' Millennium Summit that led to the adoption of the Millennium Development Goals (MDGs).

In 2001, Nujoma announced purges against gays and lesbians in Namibia, saying "the police must arrest, imprison and deport homosexuals and lesbians found in Namibia". He also described homosexuality as a "foreign and corrupt ideology".

While attending a United Nations conference in Geneva in 2000, Nujoma called AIDS a man-made biological weapon. At one point during his presidency, he banned foreign television programmes from being broadcast in Namibia, accusing them of corrupting the country's youth. In 2001, he banned government agencies from purchasing The Namibian newspaper and placing advertisements in it, accusing the paper of having an "anti-government stance".

Nujoma played a crucial role in addressing the country’s HIV/AIDS crisis, despite negative homophobic and stigmatizing comments, by advocating for awareness and policy development. He publicly recognized the epidemic as a major health challenge. Under his leadership, Namibia introduced its first National Strategic Plan on HIV/AIDS, which outlined prevention, treatment, and care initiatives. His administration collaborated with global organizations such as WHO and UNAIDS to secure funding and expand support for HIV programs and also promoted the gradual expansion of antiretroviral therapy to improve treatment access.

== Post-presidency ==
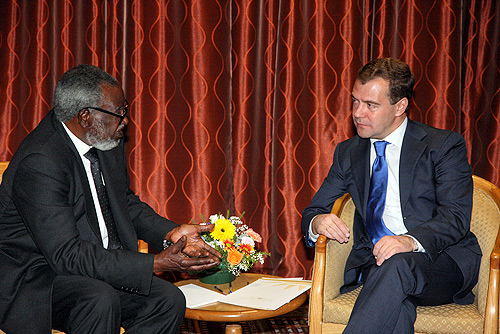
Nujoma meets with Russian president Dmitry Medvedev in Windhoek on 25 June 2009.

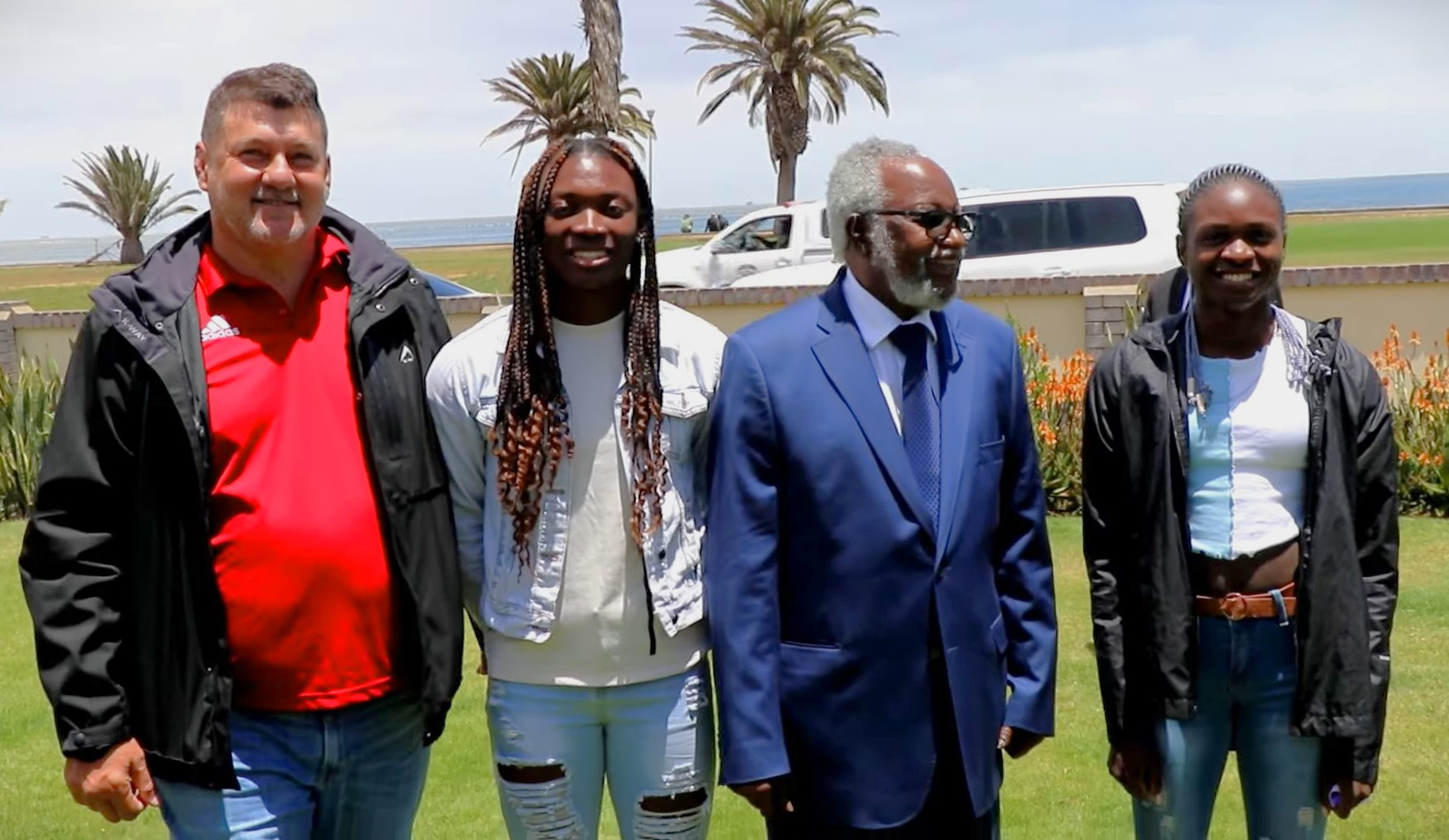
Nujoma with awarded athletes Beatrice Masilingi and Christine Mboma and their coach Henk Botha in Walvis Bay on 24 November 2021

Despite stepping down from a formal role, Nujoma remained active in the political sphere and regularly campaigned for SWAPO at various rallies and functions across the country. In 2009, Nujoma earned a master's degree in geology from the University of Namibia.

The director of the National Society for Human Rights (NSHR) in Namibia claimed in 2007 that Nujoma had connections to the CIA. The organization asked the International Criminal Court to investigate Nujoma and what they say is his role in disappearances during the independence struggle and his presidency. To date, these claims have not been substantiated.

Despite his commitment and actions during his presidency to foster racial reconciliation and harmony between Namibia's various ethnic groups, Nujoma made controversial and violent remarks after his presidency. In June 2009, he called on the SWAPO party youth to take up arms and, as he put it, "drive the colonists out of the country". In 2009, he attacked the German-speaking Evangelical Lutheran Church in Namibia (DELK), accusing it of having "collaborated with the enemy before independence and possibly still being an enemy". He also said: "We tolerate them. But if they don't behave, we will attack them. And when they call their white friends from Germany, we will shoot them in the head". In September 2009, during a speech in northern Namibia defending Zimbabwean president Robert Mugabe, Nujoma repeatedly verbally attacked Americans, Britons, and Germans and urged his supporters: "As soon as you see an Englishman, hit him with a hammer in the head". He further added, as he had done previously in June 2009: "...that Germans who are unwilling to cooperate should be shot in the head".

After leaving the presidency, Nujoma resided in his private farm near Otavi and at a SWAPO-owned property outside Windhoek. He was granted an official residence by the government in 2015.

== Personal life ==
Nujoma married Kovambo Theopoldine Katjimune on 6 May 1956. The couple had three sons and one daughter: Utoni Daniel (born 1952), John Ndeshipanda (1955–1993), Sakaria "Zacky" Nujoma (born 1957), and Nelago Nujoma (born 1959), who died at 18 months while Nujoma was in exile. Two decades elapsed before his wife joined him abroad. Nujoma's first-born son, Utoni, is a high-ranking politician and member of SWAPO who has served in both the Cabinet and the National Assembly. His youngest son, Sakaria, was named in the Panama Papers in 2016, which revealed details about the business connection between him and alleged Sicilian Mafia member Vito Palazzolo.

Nujoma's father, Daniel Uutoni Nujoma, whose sole "crime" was being Nujoma's father, was arrested at Okahao and sent to Pretoria prison in 1966. There he developed tuberculosis from which he died in 1968. Nujoma's mother, Kuku Helvi Mpingana Kondombolo, died in November 2008; she was reportedly more than 100 years old.

Nujoma's autobiography, Where Others Wavered, was published in 2001.

== Illness, death, and funeral ==
Nujoma made his last public appearance at the funeral of president Hage Geingob in February 2024. In July 2024, Nujoma was hospitalized in Windhoek after feeling ill. He had been hospitalised the previous month due to an illness and had to miss a public engagement.

On 8 February 2025, Nujoma died at a hospital in Windhoek, where he had been confined for the previous three weeks due to an illness. He was 95. The Namibian government announced a period of national mourning over his death beginning on 9 February and ordered Nujoma's remains to be transported to the Omusati, Oshana, Erongo, Kavango East, Zambezi, Otjozondjupa, Khomas and ǁKaras Regions. A memorial service was held at Independence Stadium on 28 February 2025, which was followed by Nujoma's burial on 1 March 2025 at Heroes' Acre.

The African National Congress in South Africa set its party flags at half-mast in mourning for Nujoma, while Cuba declared three days of national mourning for him.

== Legacy ==
An act of parliament of December 2005 conferred the title "Founding Father of the Namibian Nation" on former president Nujoma. His portrait has appeared on some of the country's banknotes since 2012.

Described as both "charismatic" and "fiery", Nujoma was a revered figure in Namibia for leading the country towards independence and steering it on a path towards to democracy and stability. In a press release issued after his death, the National Assembly said that his contributions to the nation's legislative processes were foundational in creating a constitutional democracy based on freedom, unity and prosperity.

The Namibian – a publication that at times had a strained relationship with Nujoma – described him as "the last of his generation of African liberation struggle leaders", placing him alongside such figures as Nelson Mandela, Samora Machel, Agostinho Neto, Robert Mugabe, Kenneth Kaunda, Julius Nyerere, Hastings Banda and Seretse Khama.

Another article in the same paper listed "Ten reasons to be thankful to Sam Nujoma", including his tireless campaigning for independence from 1960 on; the pragmatic approach he adopted in government, which enabled the country to avoid "ideological cul-de-sacs"; his "One Namibia, One Nation" approach that rejected tribalism; his decision to step down as president after three terms; his hands-off approach to his succession within SWAPO; his rejection of luxurious living; and his willingness to get his hands dirty in manual labour and never seeing himself as above his comrades.

== Honours and recognition ==
| Date of award | Honour/award title | Reason for award | Awarding body |
|---|---|---|---|
| 1973 | Lenin Peace Prize | | USSR |
| 1980 | Frédéric Joliot-Curie Gold Medal | | World Peace Council |
| 1984 | Medaglia Pontificia (Pope's Medal) Anno VI | | The Vatican City, Italy |
| 1988 | Grant Master Order Merit: The Grant Cruz (Highest Order) | | Brazil |
| 1988 | Ho Chi Minh Prize | Ho Chi Minh Peace Award | Vietnam |
| 1988 | The Namibia Freedom Award | For his leadership role in the struggle against apartheid | California State University, USA |
| 1988 | Honorary Citizenship of the City of Atlanta | For his leadership role in the struggle for freedom, national independence and social justice | Atlanta, USA |
| 1988 | Recognition granted | | City and County of San Francisco |
| 1988 | Recognition granted | | City of Chicago |
| 1988 | Recognition granted | | City of East Palo Alto |
| 1990 | Indira Gandhi Peace Prize for Disarmament and Development | In recognition of his outstanding contribution in leading the people of Namibia to freedom | India |
| 1991 | Medaglia Pontificia (Pope's Medal) Anno XIII | | The Vatican City, Italy |
| 1991 | Order of José Martí | | Cuba |
| 1991 | Ordre du Merite Congo | | Republic of Congo |
| 1992 | Chief of Golden Heart | | Kenya |
| 1992 | Order of the National Flag (First Class) | | Democratic People's Republic of Korea |
| 1994 | "Grand Cordon" Decoration | | Tunisia |
| 1995 | Grand Master of the Order of the Welwitschia | | Namibia |
| 1995 | Order of Liberty (Grand Collar) | | Portugal |
| 1995 | Africa Prize for Leadership for the Sustainable End of Hunger | | The Hunger Project |
| 1996 | Order of Good Hope (Gold) | | South Africa |
| 2002 | Order of Friendship Award | | Vietnam |
| 2003 | O.B.F.F.S. | | Romania |
| 2003 | Fellowship Award of the Institute of Governance and Social Research | In recognition of his contribution to the liberation of his country, the establishment of Democratic foundation, peace and Political stability in Namibia, and the enhancement of the dignity of the Black Man | Institute of Governance and Social Research, Nigeria |
| 2004 | Companion of the Order of the Star of Ghana (Ghana National Highest Award) | As an expression of respect and admiration of the Government and people of Ghana | Ghana |
| 2004 | Founding President of the Republic of Namibia and Father of the Namibian Nation | In recognition of his dedication to his selfless sacrifice to the national liberation struggle and nation-building | Namibian Parliament |
| 2004 | Lifetime Conservation Award | | Cheetah Conservation Fund (Nujoma was the international patron of this organisation since 1991) |
| 2007 | Leader of the Namibian Revolution | | SWAPO Party of Namibia |
| 2008 | International KIM IL Sung Prize Certificate | | Democratic People's Republic of Korea |
| 2010 | Sir Seretse Khama SADC Medal | | SADC |
| 2016 | Order of Solidarity "El Mehdi Ben Barka" | Awarded to Third World personalities who have won the esteem of the peoples of Africa, Asia and Latin America because of their struggle and outstanding contribution in the common battle for freedom, independence, peace, economic development and social justice. | Cuba |
| 2018 | Order of the Companions of O. R. Tambo | For his opposition to the government of Apartheid South Africa | South Africa |
| 2021 | Order of Francisco de Miranda First Class | By the President of the Bolivarian Republic of Venezuela, Nicolás Maduro, and the Venezuelan Minister of the People's Power for Foreign Relations, Jorge Arreasza | Venezuela |

=== Honorary doctorates ===
| Date of award | Title | Awarding university |
|---|---|---|
| 1973 | Honorary Doctorate of Law | Ahmadu Bello University, Nigeria |
| 1975 | Honorary Doctorate of Computer Science | Ombwana University, Malawi |
| 1986 | Certificate of Honour | University of Ibadan, Nigeria |
| 1990 | Honorary Doctorate Degree of Law | Lincoln University, USA |
| 1990 | Honorary Doctorate Degree of Law | National University of Lesotho, Lesotho |
| 1992 | Honorary Doctorate Degree of Technology | Federal University of Technology Minna, Nigeria |
| 1993 | Honorary Doctorate Degree in Education | University of Namibia |
| 1993 | Honorary Doctorate Degree of Law | Central State University, USA |
| 1996 | Doctor of Laws | University of Atlanta, USA, |
| 1997 | Honorary Doctorate Degree of Laws | Rutgers, The State University of New Jersey, USA |
| 1998 | Honorary Doctorate Degree | Russian Economic Academy, Russia |
| 1998 | Honorary Doctorate Degree | Peoples' Friendship University of Russia, Russia |
| 1999 | Honorary Degree of Doctor of Public Service | La Roche College, USA |
| 1999 | Honorary Degree of Doctor of Laws | University of Zimbabwe |
| 2003 | Honorary Degree of Doctor of Science | Abubakar Tafawa Balewa University, Nigeria |
| 2005 | Honorary Doctorate in Public Management | Polytechnic of Namibia |
| 2006 | Honorary Professor | China University of Geosciences |
| 2015 | Doctor of Philosophy in Peace and Conflict Studies | University of Zambia |

== See also ==
- History of Namibia
- Aaron Mushimba, brother-in-law and prominent businessperson
- Andimba Toivo ya Toivo, co-founder of both OPO and SWAPO

== In book and film ==
- Sam Nujoma, Where Others Wavered, The Autobiography of Sam Nujoma, London 2001
- Namibia: The Struggle for Liberation, epic film by Charles Burnett, the Namibian independence movement through the eyes of Nujoma

Party political offices
| New political party | President of SWAPO; 1960–2007 | Succeeded by Hifikepunye Pohamba |
| First | SWAPO nominee for President of Namibia; 1994, 1999 | Succeeded by Hifikepunye Pohamba |
Political offices
| New office | President of Namibia; 1990–2005 | Succeeded by Hifikepunye Pohamba |
