= SWANU =

Political party in Namibia

South West African National Union
- Abbreviation: SWANU
- President: Vacant
- Founder: Fanuel Kozonguizi
- Founded: 27 September 1959
- Ideology: Democratic socialism Pan-Africanism; African socialism
- Political position: Left-wing
- Colours: Red; Blue; Yellow; Green
- Slogan: Patjii ngarikotoke -- Give the land back to people
- Seats in the National Assembly: 1 / 104
- Seats in the National Council: 0 / 42
- Regional councillors: 0 / 121
- Local councillors: 0 / 378
- Pan-African Parliament: 0 / 5

Party flag

Website
- www.swanu.org.na

The South West Africa National Union (SWANU) is a Namibian political party founded in 1959. Most of its members came from the Herero people, while fellow independence movement SWAPO was mostly an Ovambo people.

== Structure and leadership ==
SWANU has a president, a vice-president, and a secretary-general. As many other socialist parties, it has a 26-member Politburo, and a 52-member Central Committee.

The first president of SWANU was Fanuel Kozonguizi, who led from its formation in 1959 until 1966. Rihupisa Justus Kandando was the president from 1998, followed by Usutuaije Maamberua, and Tangeni Iijambo.

== History ==
SWANU had its roots in the South West African Student Bureau (SWASB), an association of Namibian students studying at South African universities during the 1950s. The students had been radicalised by their firsthand exposure to apartheid in South Africa, and the active resistance to that system by the African National Congress (ANC). The SWASB became a political party in its own right in 1955, when its members renamed it the South West African Progressive Association (SWAPA) and appointed Uatja Kaukuetu as its first chairman.

SWAPA possessed little support outside academia, however, and in an attempt to expand its support base it united with the Ovamboland People's Congress (later the Ovamboland People's Organisation, or OPO), which represented Ovambo migrant labourers in Cape Town, to form the South West African National Union (SWANU) on 27 September 1959. However, SWANU's leadership and agenda remained dominated by former SWAPA members, and OPO retained its autonomy under the partnership. Fanuel Jariretundu Kozonguizi was named the first president of SWANU, with Kaukuetu, the chairman of SWAPA, being appointed vice president. The party eventually came under the direct sponsorship of the South African Communist Party and became increasingly radical as a result. Throughout late 1959, SWANU and the Herero Chiefs' Council organised a bus boycott in Windhoek's Old Location, in response to forced evictions being undertaken by the South African Police. The police opened fire on the protesters, killing or wounding up to sixty.

The Old Location shootings was the first of several political developments which ushered in a period of decline for SWANU. In the controversy surrounding the incident, the Herero Chiefs' Council disavowed SWANU and denied involvement with the Old Location protests. In July 1960, the OPO dissolved its affiliation with SWANU and issued its own party constitution. It also rebranded itself as the South West African People's Organisation (SWAPO) and opened its ranks to Namibians of all ethnic backgrounds. SWAPO's agenda was virtually identical to SWANU's: both called for an end to colonialism and imperialism, promoted pan-African ideals, and called for the economic, cultural, and social advancement of the Namibian people. However, SWANU placed a disproportionate emphasis on self-reliance, while SWAPO acknowledged the importance of external actors and the role of the United Nations in securing Namibian independence from South Africa.

Both organisations competed for international recognition and support, and the relationship between SWAPO and SWANU's leadership grew increasingly frigid. SWANU was the only one of the two parties formally represented in the All-African People's Conference, the Afro-Asian People's Solidarity Organisation, and the Anti-Apartheid Movement. It had established a political headquarters in Dar es Salaam and political offices in Accra and Cairo.

Both SWANU and SWAPO received formal recognition from the Organisation of African Unity (OAU) in 1963. They also succeeded in establishing bilateral relations with the Soviet Union and People's Republic of China. The growing severity of the Sino-Soviet split drove a rift between the two parties, however, with SWANU becoming more influenced ideologically and politically by China, and SWAPO by the Soviet Union.

By 1966, the OAU had raised £20,000 in obligatory contributions from OAU member states for funding nationalist movements in Namibia. Kozonguizi was initially confident the money would be awarded to SWANU due to its international prominence and the fact that many of its members had been educated at prestigious institutions, namely in the United States and Western Europe. However, the OAU's official policy was to base its support for anti-colonial movements on their willingness to use force if necessary. The money was offered to both SWANU and SWAPO for the express purposes of undertaking an armed struggle against South African rule. Kozonguizi refused to make a commitment to armed struggle; whether this was due to his personal preference for passive resistance or whether he was simply skeptical about the wisdom of taking up arms against the well-equipped South African security forces is disputed. The repercussions of his decision were politically catastrophic for SWANU. SWAPO was able to argue that its willingness to initiate armed struggle gave it legitimacy in the eyes of the Namibian people that SWANU lacked. The OAU immediately withdrew recognition from SWANU and awarded the £20,000 to SWAPO. It also recognised SWAPO as the sole authentic representative of the Namibian people. This doomed any remaining prospects SWANU held for receiving assistance from the OAU or any black African government.

The following year, SWANU was expelled from the Afro-Asian People's Conference. Its continued affiliation with the People's Republic of China made it unpopular, as both the Western nations and the Soviet bloc came to regard it as a Chinese proxy. Tanzanian authorities closed SWANU's headquarters in Dar es Salaam and ordered the party to leave Tanzania. Zambia, another country which had been initially sympathetic to SWANU, began refusing to accept Namibian refugees who were members of that party. With SWANU exiles considered prohibited immigrants in both Zambia and Tanzania, they were forced to settle almost solely in Botswana. Botswana was willing to accept Namibian refugees, but forbade them from engaging in politics.

From 1968 onward the party declined into political obscurity and played no major role in the Namibian independence process. SWANU did make a belated attempt to raise its own guerrilla army, which was not formally established until 1975. The OAU was unimpressed and declared it would sanction only one guerrilla army in Namibia. It urged SWANU guerrillas to join the People's Liberation Army of Namibia (PLAN), SWAPO's armed wing, instead. Aside from China and initially, Egypt, no countries were willing to supply training or arms to SWANU. SWANU's requests for military aid from various socialist states in the Soviet sphere such as Nicaragua and Vietnam were rejected. Most of these states had already offered support to PLAN, and the negative examples of Angola and Zimbabwe, where rival guerrilla armies ultimately fought each other, were frequently cited as a pretext for declining aid to SWANU. SWANU did establish one guerrilla training camp in Botswana at Dukwe, where it succeeded in smuggling some weapons. However, most of its preparations for armed struggle were purely theoretical in nature and due to Botswana's refusal to endorse guerrilla camps on its soil, all training had to be conducted on a covert basis. For the duration of the South African Border War, SWANU insurgents were confined to the Dukwe camp and did not participate in the hostilities.

== Policies ==
SWANU is a democratic socialist and nationalist party.

In January 2009, SWANU condemned Israel for their actions during the 2008–2009 Israel–Gaza conflict. Calling for an immediate ceasefire and withdrawal from the Palestinian territories, the party called for the severing of Namibian trade and diplomatic relations with Israel.

On the issue of land reform, SWANU advocated for state intervention to bring about reform more quickly. It also criticised the Ministry of Lands and Resettlement for allegedly resettling politicians on land acquired for redistribution instead of the "poorest of the poor". It also called for greater political will for land reform.

== Election results ==
For 1999 elections it formed a "Socialist Alliance" with the Workers' Revolutionary Party and got 0.35% of the vote. In the 2004 elections it finished last with 3,610 votes and 0.44% of the vote.

=== Presidential elections ===
Election	Candidate	Votes	%	Result
2009	Usutuaije Maamberua	2,968	0.37%	Lost ✗
2014	Usutuaije Maamberua	5,028	0.56%	Lost ✗
2019	Tangeni Iiyambo	5,959	0.70%	Lost ✗
2024	Evilastus Kaaronda	7,991	0.73%	Lost ✗

=== National Assembly elections ===
Election	Party leader	Votes	%	Seats	+/–	Position	Result
1994		2,598	0.53%	0 / 96	New	▲6th	Extra-parliamentary
1999		1,885	0.34%	0 / 96	0	6th	Extra-parliamentary
2004		3,610	0.44%	0 / 96	0	▼9th	Extra-parliamentary
2009	Usutuaije Maamberua	4,989	0.62%	1 / 96	▲1	9th	Opposition
2014	Usutuaije Maamberua	6,354	0.71%	1 / 96	0	▲8th	Opposition
2019	Tangeni Iiyambo	5,330	0.65%	1 / 96	0	▼11th	Opposition
2024	Evilastus Kaaronda	11,484	1.05%	1 / 96	0	▲8th	Opposition

== See also ==
- History of Namibia
- South African Border War
- South West Africa People's Organization
