= Munjuku Nguvauva II =

Namibian paramount chief (1923–2008)

- The late leader of Ovambanderu people and deputy chief of Namibia's Traditional Leaders Council. He was Chief of the Botswana Mbanderu group in 1951.
- Born: 1 January 1923; Maun, Botswana
- Died: 16 January 2008 (aged 85); Windhoek Central Hospital
- House: Ovambanderu

Munjuku Nguvauva II (January 1, 1923 – January 16, 2008) was a Namibian traditional paramount chief and leader of the Ovambanderu people, a subtribe of the Herero. Nguvauva was also deputy chief of Namibia's Traditional Leaders Council.

== Early life and ascension to chieftaincy ==
Nguvauva, a great-grandson of Mbanderu Chief Kahimemua Nguvauva, was born in Maun, Botswana, on January 1, 1923. He did not receive any formal education but was raised to be a leader of his clan and introduced to traditional and cultural knowledge and skills. He was formally inaugurated as Chief of the Botswana Mbanderu group in 1951, and when he returned to South-West Africa in 1952 he was appointed Chief of the Mbanderu at Epukiro and Aminuis. On 10 October 1960 he was promoted to Paramount Chief.

== Political activities ==
Nguvauva II supported future Namibian president Sam Nujoma on his escape into exile in 1960. When he was invited to talks with the United Nations in 1962, he requested Namibia to become independent from South Africa. This opinion angered the administration, his status as Paramount Chief was removed, and Nikanor Hoveka, formerly Chief at Epukiro, was installed as Paramount Chief of the Ovambanderu. This move is the root of a long dispute about Mbanderu paramount chieftaincy.

Nguvauva II subsequently turned down any attempt of the South African administration to win him over again by offering him positions in government and Advisory Council. When the Multi-National Council of South-West Africa was established on 1 March 1973, he refused to become a member of that body. He nevertheless was invited speaker at the end of the third and last session of the Council where he again rejected the idea of a half-hearted involvement of Namibia's indigenous population in the administration of their own affairs:

"One cannot rebuild a cracked house on weak foundations - one must first tear the building down before one starts anew."

Dirk Mudge, leader of the National Party, attempted to include Nguvauva II as representative of the 1975–1977 Turnhalle Constitutional Conference in the delegation of Clemens Kapuuo, Paramount Chief of the Herero. Nguvauva rejected this because he did not accept Kapuuo's superiority; he would only join as part of an independent delegation. He instead attended the Okahandja Conference, a congregation of parties barred from entering the official talks at Windhoek's Turnhalle building.

Munjuku Nguvauva II rejected further offers to join the South-West African administration and subsequently convinced the Mbanderu Council to form an alliance with SWAPO.

== Death and succession debate ==
Nguvauva's health began to decline after a series of strokes in November 2004 and again in 2005. Complications from the strokes left Nguvauva's with impaired speech. He spent long periods of time in the Gobabis State Hospital and the Roman Catholic Hospital in Windhoek over the next few years as his health continued to deteriorate.

Nguvauva was rushed from his home in Ezorongondo in the Epukiro Constituency to Windhoek Central Hospital on 14 January 2008. He died two days later at the age of 84. Immediately after his death a power struggle developed over the succession to the Mbanderu throne. One potential candidate was Namibia's Fisheries Deputy Minister Kilus Nguvauva, who is Munjuku II Nguvauva's son from a previous relationship. Kilus Nguvauva, like his father, was born in Botswana, another claimant was his half-brother Keharanjo Nguvauva, the then 23-year-old son of Munjuku II Nguvauva and his wife. Keharanjo Nguvauva was born in Namibia but grew up in Botswana together with his older half-brother. Keharanjo was at that time attending law school in South Africa.

Keharanjo Nguvauva was made chief in 2008. The choice was confirmed by a government enquiry commission in 2009. When Keharanjo took his life in 2011 the succession battle reignited, this time between Kilus Nguvauva and Aletha Nguvauva who was crowned queen by one OvaMbanderu faction. Only late in 2014 was a decision reached when government decided not to appeal a 2013 Supreme Court decision in favor of Kilus Nguvauva, who was scheduled to be inaugurate on 21 November. Members of the Ovambanderu Traditional Authority had before called for a change of the tribal constitution to allow for a smoother transition and greater say in who becomes Chief. This position was opposed by others who call themselves the "Concerned Group".

Preceded by Nikanor Hoveka	Chief of the Ovambanderu people 1952–2008	Succeeded by Keharanjo Nguvauva
