= Epukiro =

- Settlement
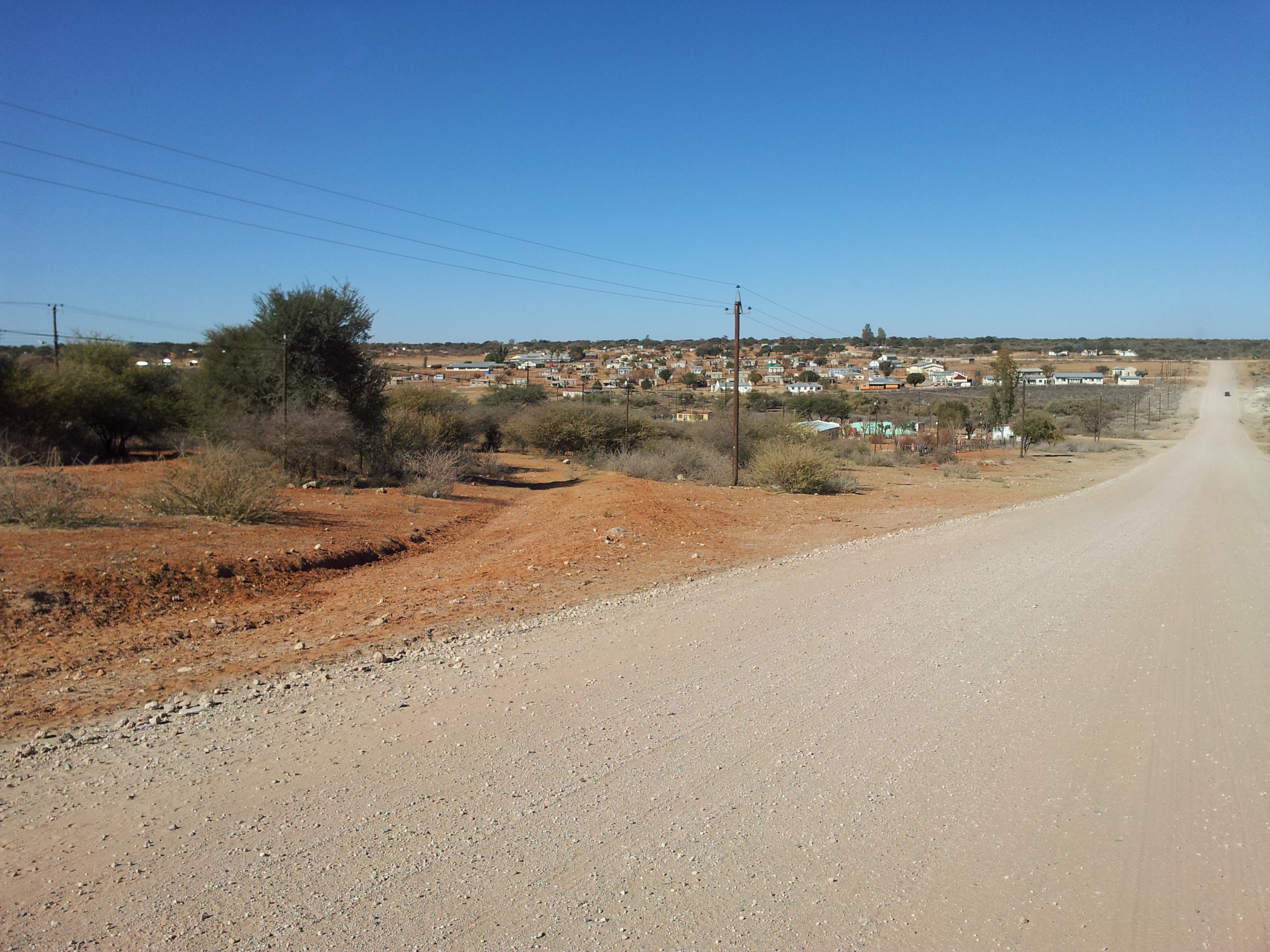
- The Post 3 (Omauezonjanda) location within Epukiro.

- Location in Namibia
- Coordinates: 21°42′00″S 19°07′00″E
- Country: Namibia
- Region: Omaheke Region
- Constituency: Okorukambe Constituency, Epukiro Constituency
- Elevation: 4,793 ft (1,461 m)
- Time zone: UTC+2 (South African Standard Time)
- Climate: BSh

Epukiro is a cluster of populated places in the remote eastern part of the Omaheke Region of Namibia, situated along the Epukiro rivier about 120 kilometres (75 mi) northeast of the regional capital Gobabis. One of the centres of the populated area is the Catholic mission station with its affiliated school, another is Epukiro Post 3, also called Omauezonjanda (or Omawewozonyanda), where the Constituency office and a police station are located. Other populated places are: Otjondjima, Okozondje, Okasaira, Okombombi, Okangwindi, Ezorongondo, Ohakavena, Ovinjuru, Katuuo, Otjimanangombe, Ovituua. In total Epukiro had about 3,200 inhabitants in 1997, predominantly ethnic Tswana.

Since Namibian independence the larger part of Epukiro belonged to the Otjinene Constituency. This constituency was split in 2004 and the new Epukiro Constituency was created. The western segment with the Catholic mission always belonged and still belongs to the Okorukambe Constituency.

== History ==
The settlement was formed in 1902 when the Roman Catholic Church bought the 30,000 ha farm Epukiro. The namesake of the farm and the settlement is the Epukiro River, an ephemeral river which cuts through the farm from west to east.

A mission station was founded in 1904 by the Missionary Oblates of Mary Immaculate, a Catholic congregation. It was destroyed one year later during the Herero and Namaqua War. The German colonial administration opened a post office in 1905.

The Herero and Nama War of 1904–1908 saw tens of thousands of Herero people killed, almost their entire population. Survivors had lost their land and cattle, and the land originally in the hands of the Herero was now farmland in the possession of white settlers. When after World War I Germany lost all its colonies and South-West Africa became mandate territory of South Africa, the new administration was unable, perhaps unwilling, to undo the land transfer. A South African administrator writes:

"Seeing that the whole Hereroland was confiscated by the Germans and cut up into farms and is now settled by Europeans it would be an impossible project ... to place them back on their tribal lands."

To accommodate the Ovaherero, the South African administration created eight "native reserves" for them of which the Epukiro Reserve was one. The Epukiro Reserve existed as an administrative structure until the 1970s.

== People ==
Epukiro is inhabited by Tswana, Ovambanderu, and San people. Ovambanderu and Herero people share the same ancestry. Herero see the Mbanderu as one of their clans while Mbanderu regard themselves as a distinct group. This difference is the cause of a decades–old rift between the two, with one faction, the Ovambanderu Council of Epukiro and Aminuis seeking recognition of the Mbanderu as a distinct tribe. The other faction aims for a strong and united Herero people under the Tjamuaha-Maharero Royal House and accuses the Mbanderu of artificial division.

Today the Ovambanderu Traditional Authority is the heir of the Ovambanderu Council. Their headquarters is situated at the Post 3 (Otjiherero: Omauezonjanda) location at the outskirts of Epukiro, 40 kilometres (25 mi) east of its centre (21°36′S 19°25′E). The royal homestead is located at Ezorongondo.

After the death of Mbanderu paramount chief Munjuku Nguvauva II in 2008 the rift in the Ovambanderu community deepened. One faction calling themselves the "Concerned Group" supported Keharanjo Nguvauva as successor to the throne. They crowned him in 2008 because he was born in wedlock of Munjuku and his wife Aletta. The other faction of the Ovambanderu Traditional Authority favoured his older half-brother, Deputy Minister of Fisheries Kilus Nguvauva. A government enquiry commission confirmed Keharanjo as chief in 2009. After the death of Keharanjo, Aletta was elected as the paramount chief to succeed her son Keharanjo.

== Economy and infrastructure ==
The Epukiro area is underdeveloped with regards to access to safe water and sanitation, and medical care. There are government clinics in Epukiro, Omauezonjanda and Otjimanangombe but no ambulance and no mortuary. The main economic activity is farming with cattle and goats. While the Mbanderu are reasonably well-off, the San live in abject poverty.

Epukiro is situated west of the national road C22 halfway between Okakarara and Gobabis. It is further connected by the C44, that goes through the Post 3 settlement and further to Gam. These roads are not tarred and used to be in generally bad shape.

== Education ==
There are several schools in the Epukiro area, among them:

- Epukiro Post 3 Junior Secondary School
- Epukiro Roman Catholic Primary School
- Omuhaturua Primary School (in Otjimanangombe)
- Goeie Hoop Primary School (in Okovimburu Post 10)
- Gqaina Primary School (especially for San children) (in Du Plessis)
- Morukutu Primary School (in Otjiyarua north of Epukiro)
