= Aminuis =

- Settlement
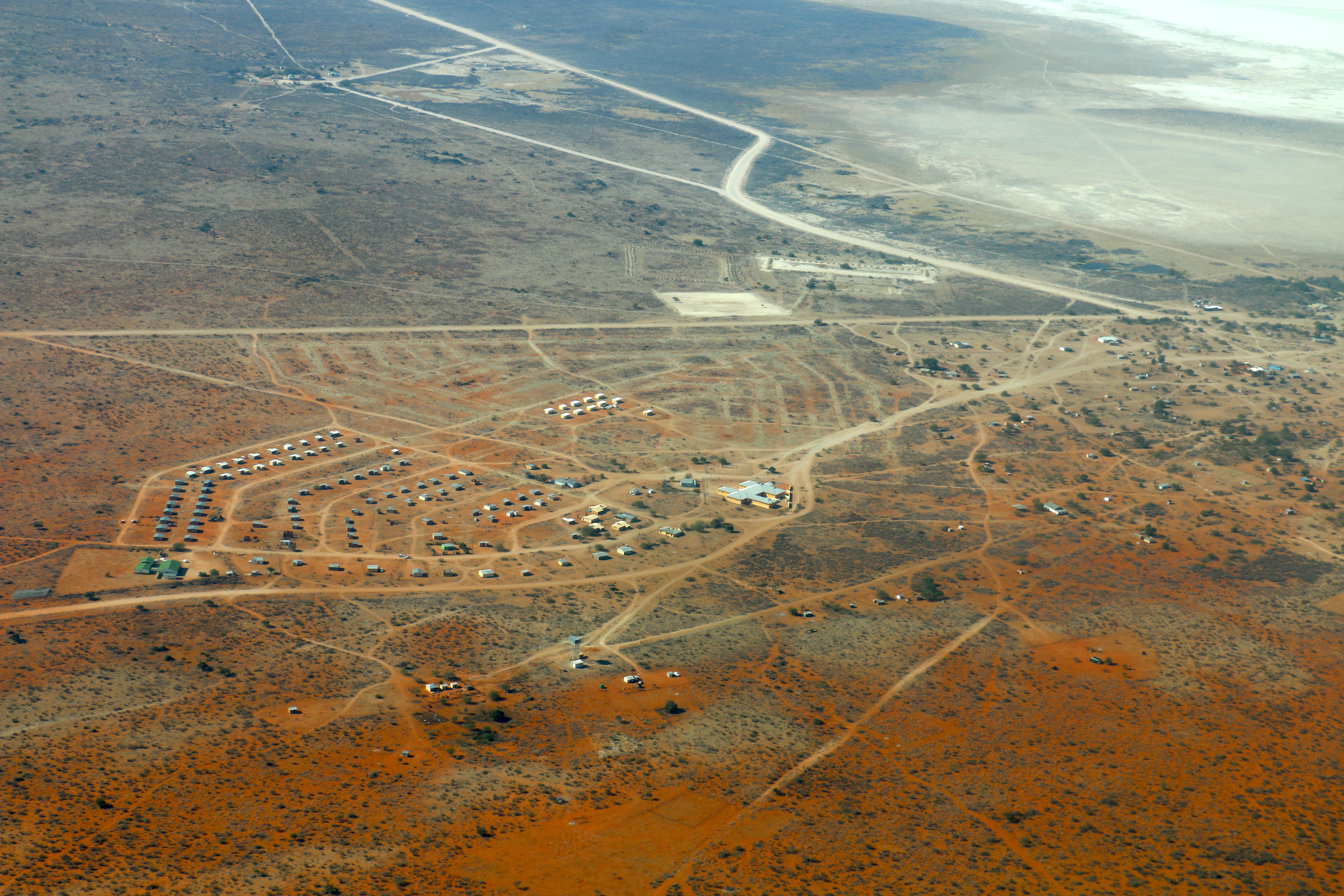
- Aminuis from bird's eye view (2017)

- Location in Namibia
- Coordinates: 23°38′00″S 19°22′00″E
- Country: Namibia
- Region: Omaheke Region
- Constituency: Aminuis Constituency
- Time zone: UTC+2 (South African Standard Time)
- Climate: BWh

Aminuis is a cluster of small settlements in the remote eastern part of the Omaheke Region of Namibia, located about 500 km east of Windhoek. It is the district capital of the Aminuis electoral constituency.

== Economy and Infrastructure ==
Aminuis features a post office and police station. Many government ministries have dependencies in the settlement. The Catholic Church operates a parish, Our Lady of Perpetual Succour in Aminuis; it belongs to the Archdiocese of Windhoek. The Roman Catholic Church is the oldest church in Aminuis. Other churches include Oruuano Church, Zion Christian Church (ZCC), St Phellips, and a Born Again church.

The village is riddled by poverty and joblessness. The main economic activity is subsistence farming with cattle, goats and sheep but frequent droughts make this difficult. The Tswana people used to mine salt from a nearby pan but went out of business after they could not meet the demand that it be iodised.

== Education ==
There are a number of schools in the Aminuis area:

- Roman Catholic Mokaleng Combined School, a school founded by missionaries in 1902
- Rietquelle Junior Secondary School, Rietquelle, founded in 1935 as first government school for the indigenous population. Founder and at first sole teacher at the school was Otto Schimming.
- Motsomi Primary School
- Hosea Kutako Primary School, built in 1974 with a capacity of 900 learners
- Dr. Fisher Primary School.

== History ==
The area around Aminuis was inhabited by San since at least the 18th century. In the 1880s Tswana people settled at Aminuis with the permission of Andreas Lambert of Leonardville, Kaptein of the Kaiǀkhauan (Khauas Nama).

In 1902 the Missionary Oblates of Mary Immaculate, a congregation of the Roman Catholic Church, founded a missionary station and a school.

On 1 December 1905 at the height of the Herero and Namaqua War of 1904–1907, Imperial Germany's Schutztruppe ("protection force", the unit deployed to the German colony) and fighters of the Red Nation clashed south-east of Aminuis in the Battle of ǃGu-ǃoms. Manasse ǃNoreseb, leader of the Red Nation and today regarded a hero of the struggle against colonisation in Namibia, died in this battle.

The Herero and Namaqua War of 1904–1907 saw tens of thousands of Herero killed, almost its entire population. Survivors had lost their land and cattle, and the land originally in the hands of the Herero was now farmland in the possession of white settlers. When after World War I Germany lost all its colonies and South-West Africa became mandate territory of South Africa, the new administration was unable, perhaps unwilling, to undo the land transfer. A South African administrator writes:

"Seeing that the whole Hereroland was confiscated by the Germans and cut up into farms and is now settled by Europeans it would be an impossible project ... to place them back on their tribal lands."

To accommodate the Ovaherero, the South African administration created eight "native reserves" for them of which the Aminuis Reserve was one. After the Aminuis Reserve was declared in the 1920s, landless Herero people migrated into the area and soon formed the vast majority of its inhabitants. The administrative structures of the reserves existed until the 1970s.

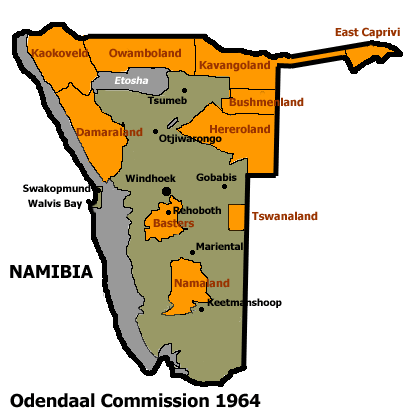
Allocation of Land to bantustans according to the Odendaal Plan. Tswanaland is the rectangle in eastern central South-West Africa

When the apartheid-era government of South Africa devised the Odendaal Plan in the 1960s, part of Aminuis was designated to belong to Tswanaland, a bantustan intended to be a self-governing homeland for the Tswana people. Unlike all other homelands, it was never implemented that way. Herero people were allowed to stay in the area, and Tswanas remained a minority. Tswanaland nevertheless got an ethnic Tswana, Constance Kgosiemang, as political leader between 1980 and 1989.

== People ==
The area of Aminuis today is inhabited by Ovambanderu and a Tswana minority counting approximately 500 people in 2005. Ovambanderu and Herero people share the same ancestry. Herero see the Mbanderu as one of their clans while Mbanderu regard themselves as a distinct group. This difference is the cause of a decades–old rift between the two, with one faction, the Ovambanderu Council of Epukiro and Aminuis seeking recognition of the Mbanderu as a distinct tribe. The other faction aims for a strong and united Herero people under the Tjamuaha-Maharero Royal House and accuses the Mbanderu of artificial division.

Today the Ovambanderu Traditional Authority is the heir of the Ovambanderu Council. Their headquarters is situated at the small settlement of Omauozonjanda which belongs to Epukiro but is 40 km east of its centre. The royal homestead is located at Ezorongondo.

After the death of Mbanderu paramount chief Munjuku Nguvauva II in 2008 the rift in the Ovambanderu community deepened. One faction calling themselves the "Concerned Group" supported Keharanjo Nguvauva as successor to the throne. They crowned him in 2008 because he was born in wedlock of Munjuku and his wife Aletta. The other faction of the Ovambanderu Traditional Authority favoured his older half-brother, Deputy Minister of Fisheries Kilus Nguvauva. A government enquiry commission confirmed Keharanjo as chief in 2009.

=== Notable people from Aminuis ===
- Constance Kgosiemang, leader of Tswanaland between 1980 and 1989 and member of Namibia's Constituent Assembly
- Hosea Kutako, national hero of Namibia, paramount chief of the Ovaherero people 1917–1970. Chief Kutako led the negotiations of the allocation of the Aminuis reserve.
- Steve Mogotsi, politician, the first ethnic Tswana to serve in any Namibian cabinet
- Kuaima Riruako (1935–2014), politician, paramount chief of the Herero and president of the National Unity Democratic Organisation (NUDO)
- Hulda Shipanga, first black nurse in Namibia to be promoted to matron, the highest rank
- Razundara Tjikuzu, former professional footballer who played for Werder Bremen and various other clubs in Bundesliga
- Ebson Uanguta, deputy governor of the Bank of Namibia
