= Nguvauva =

Nguvauva is the surname of a clan of the Ovambanderu, a sister tribe to the Herero people of Namibia, Botswana, Angola and South Africa.:

- Kahimemua Nguvauva (1850-1896), Paramount chief of the Ovambanderu(Ombara Otjitambi)
- Keharanjo Nguvauva (1984-2011), chief of the Ovambanderu
- Kilus Nguvauva, Deputy Minister of Works and Transport of Namibia
- Munjuku Nguvauva, chief of the Ovambanderu, father of Kahimemua Nguvauva
- Munjuku Nguvauva II (1923-2008), Paramount chief of the Ovambanderu (Ombara Otjitambi)
- Aletta Nguvauva Mother of Keharanjo Nguvauva, widow of Munjuku Nguvauva II
