= Omaheke Regional Library =

Library in Gobabis, Omaheke Region, Namibia

Omaheke Regional Library, Gobabis, Namibia

The Omaheke Regional Library is a library in Gobabis the capital of Omaheke Region of Namibia. It is situated between Gobabis' Epako suburb and the Legare Stadium), and was opened on November 25, 2014, by then-minister of education David Namwandi. The Omaheke regional library intends to introduce programmes and activities for the community in an effort to attract more visitors.

== Funding ==
The library is one of three regional libraries (the other two are in Oshakati, Oshana; and Helao Nafidi, Ohangwena). These libraries are also known as Regional Study and Resource Centers (RSRCs), and were funded by the Millennium Challenge Corporation (Namibia Account) at a cost of N$167 million, in partnership with the National Library and Archives service (NLAS), a division of the Ministry of Education, Arts and Culture (MoEAC)

== Services ==
The Omaheke Regional Library provides library patrons access to traditional library services and materials including access to the Internet. The library also operates a mobile unit that visits communities in the Omaheke region and is equipped with computers, televisions, and a book collection. The regional library aim to provide tailored programs, ICTs, and information services that address surrounding communities’ most pressing needs. The library also offer free internet to its users.

Library Mobile Unit
