= Gobabis Constituency =

Electoral constituency in the Omaheke region of eastern Namibia

Coordinates: 22°27′S 18°58′E

Gobabis constituency (red) in the Omaheke Region of Namibia

Gobabis Constituency is an electoral constituency in the Omaheke Region of Namibia. As of December 2019 it had 13,457 registered voters.

Gobabis Constituency covers an area of 5,770 km^{2} (2,230 sq mi). It had a population of 20,993 in 2011, up from 15,119 in 2001. The constituency covers the rural area southeast of Gobabis and the town itself, except its eastern Nossobville suburb which belongs to Kalahari Constituency. Gobabis is also the seat of the constituency office.

== Politics ==
Gobabis is traditionally a stronghold of the South West Africa People's Organization (SWAPO) party. In the 2004 regional elections its candidate, sitting Omaheke governor Laura McLeod, was elected with 2,865 of the 5,497 votes cast.

The 2015 regional election was won by Phillipus Katamelo of the SWAPO Party with 3,355 votes, followed by Ellenterius Modise of the Democratic Turnhalle Alliance (DTA) with 866 votes and Foreman Kamezuu of the Rally for Democracy and Progress (RDP) with 464 votes. After councillor Katamelo was fielded as a parliamentary candidate in the 2019 Namibian general election, a by-election became necessary for Gobabis because Namibian electoral law prohibits sitting councillors and members of the public service to run for a seat in parliament. The by-election was conducted on 15 January 2020. Augustinus Tebele (SWAPO) won with 1,409 votes, followed by Sylvestor Binga of the Landless People's Movement (LPM, 571 votes), Ellenterius Modise of the Popular Democratic Movement (PDM, the new name of the DTA, 277 votes) and independent candidate Iuonga Kauesa (82 votes).

Councillor Tebele (SWAPO) was reelected in the 2020 regional election with 2,410 votes, followed by Lesley Pienaar (LPM) with 840 votes, independent candidate Izak de Beer with 673 votes, and Elvire Theron of the National Unity Democratic Organisation (NUDO) with 579 votes.

== See also ==
- Administrative divisions of Namibia
