= Nikodemus Kavikunua =

Nikodemus Kavikunua (died 12 June 1896), also known as Nikodemus Kambahahiza, was a chief of the Herero people in the former German South West Africa from 1880 to 1896.

== Life ==
He was the eldest son of Kavikunua, who himself was the eldest son of Tjamuaha, making him a contender in the succession of the Paramount chief of the Herero.

When Maharero died in 1890, he was one of the people contending for Paramount chief. When in 1891, the German colonial power made Samuel Maharero the Paramount chief of the Herero, he and others rejected this. On 5 July 1892, he and others attacked Hendrik Witbooi in his stronghold Hornkranz, but they were defeated. On return to Windhoek, German colonial troops attacked Kavikunua and the other fighters, leaving two dead and several wounded.

In January 1895, Nikodemus Kavikunua and Mbanderu leader Kahimemua Nguvauva had a border dispute with the Germans over the Eastern sector of German South West Africa. Theodor Leutwein negotiated an agreement over the border with Kavikunua on 15 June 1895 and Kavikunua's claim to Gobabis was not granted. The Germans created a military garrison in Gobabis.

On 8 April 1896, Leutwein in agreement with Samuel Maharero dismissed Kavikunua and Nguvauva from their positions as chiefs. The ensuing German Ovambanderu War displaced lots of Mbanderu to present-day Botswana. Kavikunua and Nguvauva were regarded as the main responsible for the war and were executed by the German colonial authorities by firing squad in Okahandja on 12 June 1896 after a court-martial proceeding. Samuel Maharerero supposedly was agreeing to the executions in order to get rid of rivalling chiefs.

== Commemoration ==
Nikodemus Kavikunua's grave is located in the Rhenish Mission Church in Okahandja, which today is a memorial site of the annually held Herero Day.

The Ovambanderu Traditional Authority regularly commemorates his death and his opposition to German colonialism.
