= Otjinene =

Village in eastern Namibia

- Village
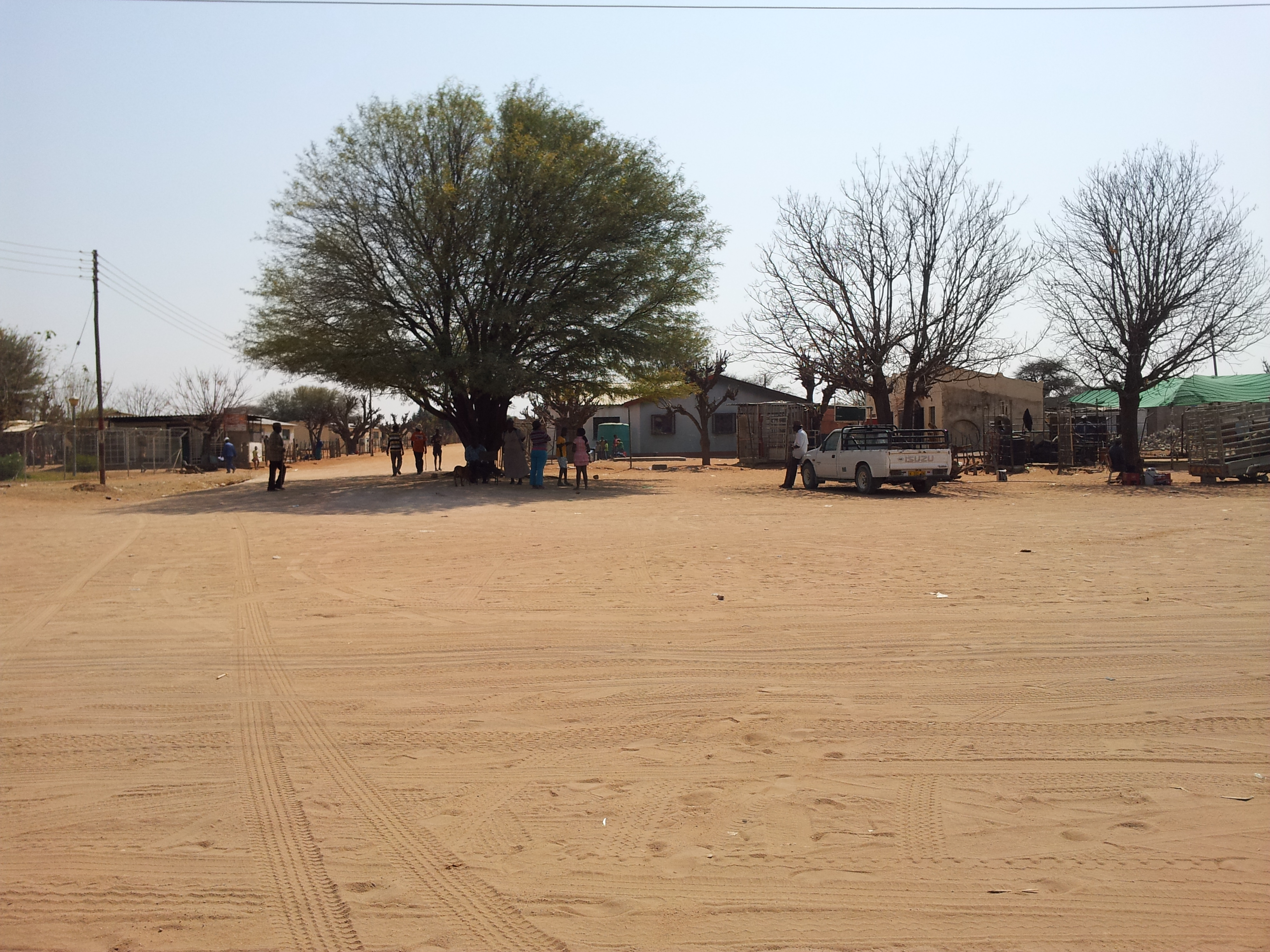
- Public place in the centre of the village

- Otjinene, Namibia
- Coordinates: 21°08′00″S 18°46′00″E
- Country: Namibia
- Region: Omaheke Region
- Constituency: Otjinene Constituency

Population (2023)
  - Total: 6,876
- Time zone: UTC+2 (SAST)
- Climate: BSh

Otjinene is a village in the Omaheke Region of Namibia. It is the district capital of the Otjinene Constituency and had a population of 6,876 people in 2023.

== Geography ==
Otjinene is connected via a 157 kilometres (98 mi) tarred road to the regional capital Gobabis, and via a 227 kilometres (141 mi) road which was tarred in 2017, to Grootfontein.

Otjinene is surrounded by a communal area, where there are many villages. There are more or less 20 households in each village. The majority of people around Otjinene are communal farmers, farming with cattle, goats and sheep. There is one health clinic which is operated by the Ministry of Health and Social Services, and a number of retail stores.

c. 18 kilometres (11 mi) to the Northeast is the Ozombuzovindimba heritage site. This is the place where in 1904 Lothar von Trotha issued the extermination order against the OvaHerero and Nama people, starting the Herero and Namaqua Genocide which would kill about 80% of all OvaHerero. OvaHerero and OvaMbanderu people gather annually here to commemorate lives and deaths of their ancestors.

Historical population
Year	Pop.	±% p.a.
2011	2,102	—
2023	6,876	+10.38%

== Politics ==
Otjinene was proclaimed a village by the government in 2011. Since then it is governed by a village council that has five seats. Lesley Kauandara, is currently serving as the chairperson of the Otjinene Village Council.

Otjinene is one of the few local authorities where Namibia's ruling SWAPO party is in the opposition. In the 2015 local authority election it only gained one seat (488 votes). The election was won by the National Unity Democratic Organisation (NUDO) which gained three seats (787 votes). The remaining seat went to the Democratic Turnhalle Alliance (DTA, 204 votes). NUDO also won the 2020 local authority election. It obtained 823 votes and gained three village council seats. One seat each went to the Popular Democratic Movement (PDM), formerly DTA, with 351 votes and to SWAPO (319 votes).
