= Namibian Oncology Centre =

Private oncology services facility in Namibia

The Namibian Oncology Centre

Geography
- Location: Windhoek, Khomas Region, Namibia
- Coordinates: 22°32′40″S 17°03′45″E

Organisation
- Care system: Private
- Type: Cancer Treatment, Research and Rehabilitation

Services
- Beds: 12

History
- Founded: July 2015; 10 years ago

Links
- Website: https://www.namoncology.com/
- Other links: List of hospitals in Namibia; Health in Namibia

The Namibian Oncology Centre (Pty) Ltd (NOC) is a private, specialized, tertiary care medical facility. The facility offers radiotherapy since July 2015 and oncology pharmacy together with chemotherapy since November 2015.

== Locations ==
NOC maintains three locations, two in the capital city of Windhoek and one in Swakopmund. NOC is in the process of construction a 4th centre in Ongwediva, which is anticipated to open in August 2026. The detailed locations are as follows:

- Windhoek Khomasdal Facility, at the corner of Mahatma Gandhi and Hans Dietrich Genscher Street
- Windhoek Eros Facility, at 3 Heliodoor Street (access to Radiation and Ward facilities) and 5,7 and 9 Omaruru Street (access to consultation and chemotherapy facilities)
- Swakopmund Facility, along Henties Bay Road
- Ongwediva Facility, Erf no 3274, near Ongwediva Medipark

== Overview ==
NOC is a privately owned cancer treatment, rehabilitation and research center, owned by a consortium of private individuals. NOC began serving the public with pharmacy, radiation, chemotherapy, and oncology rehabilitative services in 2015. Before that, patients who needed radiation, had to travel to South Africa to receive those services. The center's digital linear accelerator, is the first in the country and also serves private patients referred from neighboring countries, including Angola. As of 2016, the cancer centre maintained a private in-patient ward with 12 beds.

== Background ==
Namibia is a Southern African country, with a population of about 3 million as of 2024. The most prevalent cancers in Namibia as of 2016 were (1) Skin cancer (2) Kaposi's sarcoma, which is HIV/AIDS related (3) Breast cancer (4) Prostate cancer (5) Cervical cancer and (6) Oral cavity cancer, in that order.

NOC was established in 2015, to complement and relieve the Dr AB May Cancer Treatment Centre at Windhoek Central Hospital, the largest public hospital in the country. It is also intended to reduce the number of private patients in Namibia seeking oncology services in neighboring South Africa.

== Staff ==
As of October 2025, NOC employs about 78 staff members, including oncologists, nurses, physicians and therapists.

== See also ==
- Health in Namibia
- List of hospitals in Namibia
