= Leaders of Tswanaland =

Tswanaland was a Bantustan or "homeland" and later a second-tier authority in South West Africa for the Tswana people during the apartheid period.

Tenure	Incumbent	Affiliation
19 December 1980 to May 1989	Constance Kgosiemang, Chairman of the Executive Committee	DTA

== Political Affiliation ==
DTA – Democratic Turnhalle Alliance

== See also ==
- Namibia
- Bantustans in South West Africa
- Apartheid
- Presidents of Namibia
- Prime Ministers of Namibia
