= Shafimana Ueitele =

Namibian judge

- Born: September 6, 1963 (age 62); Gobabis, Omaheke Region, South West Africa
- Education: University of the West Indies at Cave Hill
- Occupations: Judge, former law lecturer

Shafimana Fikameni Immanuel Ueitele (born 6 September 1963) is a Namibian judge of the Supreme Court of Namibia and former Senior Lecturer at the University of Namibia.

== Biography ==
Ueitele was born in Gobabis, Omaheke Region. He earned his Bachelor of Laws at the University of Zimbabwe, where he studied from 1986 to 1990. He earned a Master of Laws from the University of the West Indies at Cave Hill in Barbados, after studying from 1990 to 1992. Upon the independence of Namibia in 1990, Ueitele was appointed an Electoral Commissioner with the Electoral Commission of Namibia. He was reappointed in 2005. Ueitele also worked for the City of Windhoek, becoming a Strategic Executive. In 2001, he became a senior faculty member at the University of Namibia Law Department. He represented Ramatex, a clothing manufacturer which opened a textile factory in 2002. It abruptly closed the factory in 2008. Ueitele is also a legal advisor to the Namibia Football Association, which governs association football in the country.
