= Steinhausen, Namibia =

Steinhausen
- Settlement
- Location in Namibia
- Coordinates: 21°49′00″S 18°19′00″E
- Country: Namibia
- Region: Omaheke Region
- Constituency: Okarukambe Constituency
- Time zone: UTC+2 (SAST)
- Climate: BSh

Steinhausen is a farm in the Omaheke Region of central-eastern Namibia, located north-west of the regional capital Gobabis. Until August 2013 the Okarukambe Constituency was named after Steinhausen.

Steinhausen receives an average of 343.7 millimetres (13.53 in) of rainfall per year.
