= List of buildings and structures in Namibia =

== Business ==
- Sanlam Centre, Windhoek

== Dams ==
- Avis Dam near Windhoek
- Bondels Dam near Karasburg
- Friedenau Dam near Windhoek
- Goreangab Dam near Windhoek
- Hardap Dam near Mariental
- Nauaspoort Dam near Groot Aub
- Naute Dam near Keetmanshoop
- Oanob Dam near Rehoboth
- Olushandja Dam near Oshakati
- Omatako Dam near Windhoek
- Omatjenne Dam near Otjiwarongo
- Sartorius von Bach Dam near Okahandja
- Swakoppoort Dam near Okahandja
- Tilda Viljoen Dam near Gobabis

== Government ==
- State House of Namibia
- Tintenpalast

== Hospitals ==
There are 369 medical facilities in Namibia, including 36 hospitals. Other medical facilities are clinics and health centers. The following are some of the more notable hospitals and clinics:

- Cottage Medi-Clinic
- Gobabis State Hospital
- Katutura State Hospital
- Onandjokwe Lutheran Hospital
- Roman Catholic Hospital
- Rundu State Hospital
- Windhoek Central Hospital
- Keetmanshoop State Hospital
- Lady Pohamba Private Hospital
- Namibian Oncology Centre

== Malls ==
- Maerua Mall
- Wernhil Park Mall
- The Grove Mall of Namibia

== Museums, parks and monuments ==
- Alte Feste
- Parliament Gardens
- Zoo Park

== Sports venues ==
- Kuisebmund Stadium in Walvis Bay
- Rossmund Desert Golf Course in Swakopmund
- Hage Geingob Rugby Stadium in Windhoek
- Independence Stadium in Windhoek
- Khomasdal Stadium in Katutura
- Ramblers Stadium in Windhoek
- Sam Nujoma Stadium in Katutura
- Windhoek Country Club Resort outside of Windhoek
- Mokati Stadium in Otjiwarongo
- Oscar Norich Stadium in Tsumeb
- Oshakati Independence Stadium in Oshakati
