= Gobabis Residents' Association =

Political party in Namibia

The Gobabis Residents' Association (GRA) is a local political party in Gobabis, Namibia.

In the 1998 municipal elections GRA won 3 out of 7 seats in the Gobabis council. After the elections, GRA teamed up with SWAPO to rule the municipality, while observers would have expected that its main ally would be the Democratic Turnhalle Alliance, an opposition party. Rosemarie Swart of GRA became deputy mayor and Priscilla Christiaans became the council's vice-chairperson. Both Swart and Christiaans, as well as GRA member Petrus van Zyl became members of the management committee.

In the May 2004 municipal elections, GRA received 1,031 votes (19.7%) and won only one seat, which went to Louis van der Merwe. The party did not contest the 2015 local authority election. Since gaining 681 votes in the 2020 local authority election the GRA has again one seat in the city council.
