= Kgosiemang =

Kgosiemang is a surname. Notable people with the surname include:

- Kabelo Kgosiemang (born 1986), Botswana high-jumper
- Constance Kgosiemang (1946–2012), Namibian tribal chief
