= Epukiro Post 3 Junior Secondary School =

School in Namibia

Coordinates: 21°36′00″S 19°25′04″E

Location
- Omauezonjanda; Epukiro, Omaheke Region; Namibia

Information
- Established: 1932; 94 years ago
- Principal: Mr Kanguatjivi
- Teaching staff: 14
- Enrollment: c. 420

Epukiro Post 3 Junior Secondary School is a school in the Omauezonjanda (Post 3) location of Epukiro. It is situated in the Omaheke Region in rural eastern Namibia.

The school was founded in 1932. The current principal is Mr Kanguatjivi. In 2007 the principal was Mr. T.Tjozongoro. The school has 14 teachers and 420 learners; beyond the local community it also serves foreign learners from Osire refugee camp.

== See also ==
- Education in Namibia
- List of schools in Namibia
