= Shipanga =

Shipanga is a surname. Notable people with the surname include:

- Andreas Shipanga (1931–2012), Namibian politician
- Hulda Shipanga (1926–2010), Namibian nurse
- Jacqui Shipanga, Namibian national women's soccer coach
- Paulus Shipanga (born 1980), Namibian footballer
