= Witvlei =

Village in eastern Namibia

Witvlei ǃUri ǃKhubus
- Village
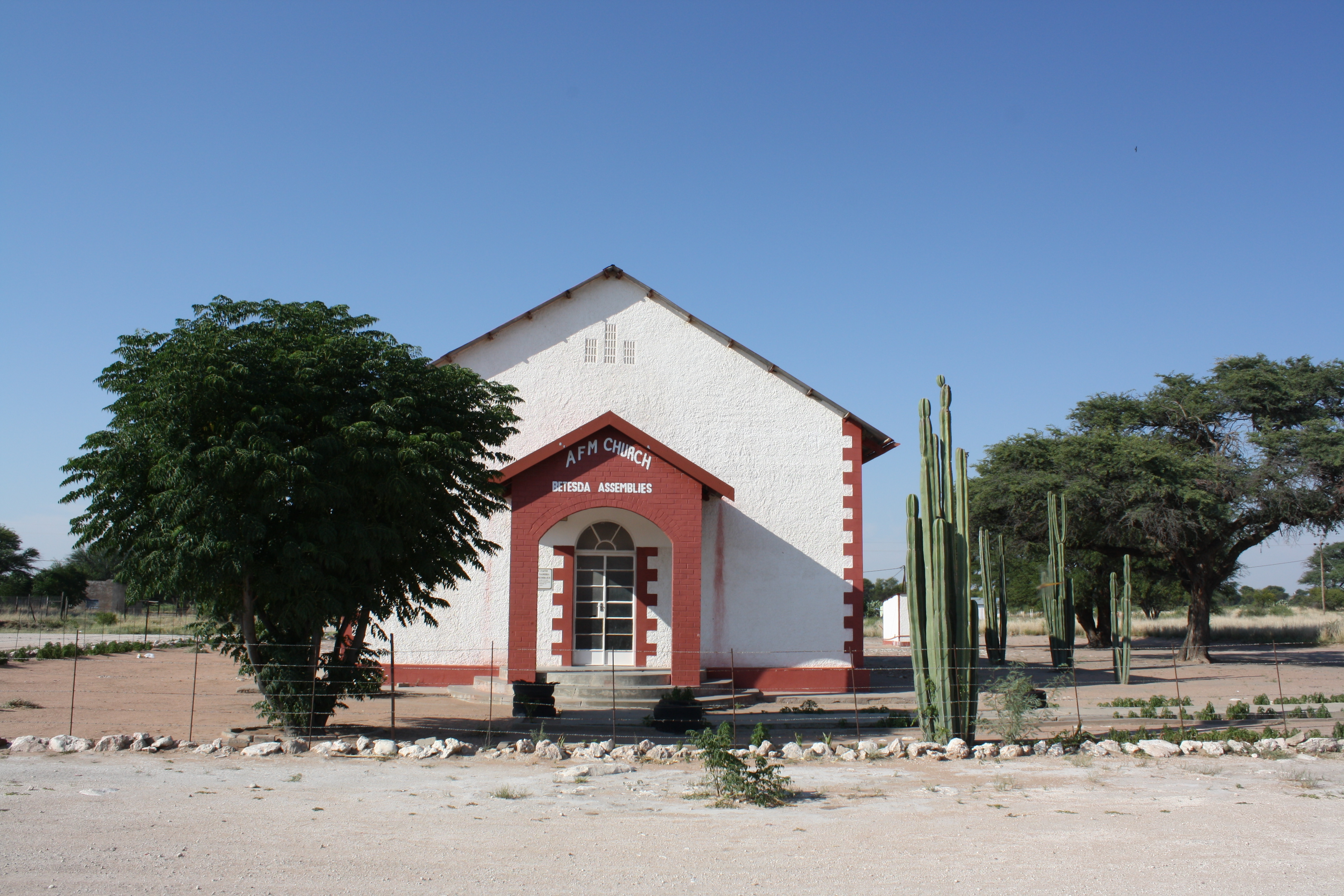
- Witvlei AFM church

- Location in Namibia
- Coordinates: 22°24′59″S 18°29′49″E
- Country: Namibia
- Region: Omaheke Region
- Constituency: Okarukambe Constituency
- Elevation: 4,751 ft (1,448 m)

Population (2023)
  - Total: 2,633
- Time zone: UTC+2 (SAST)
- Climate: BSh

Pronunciation of Witvlei

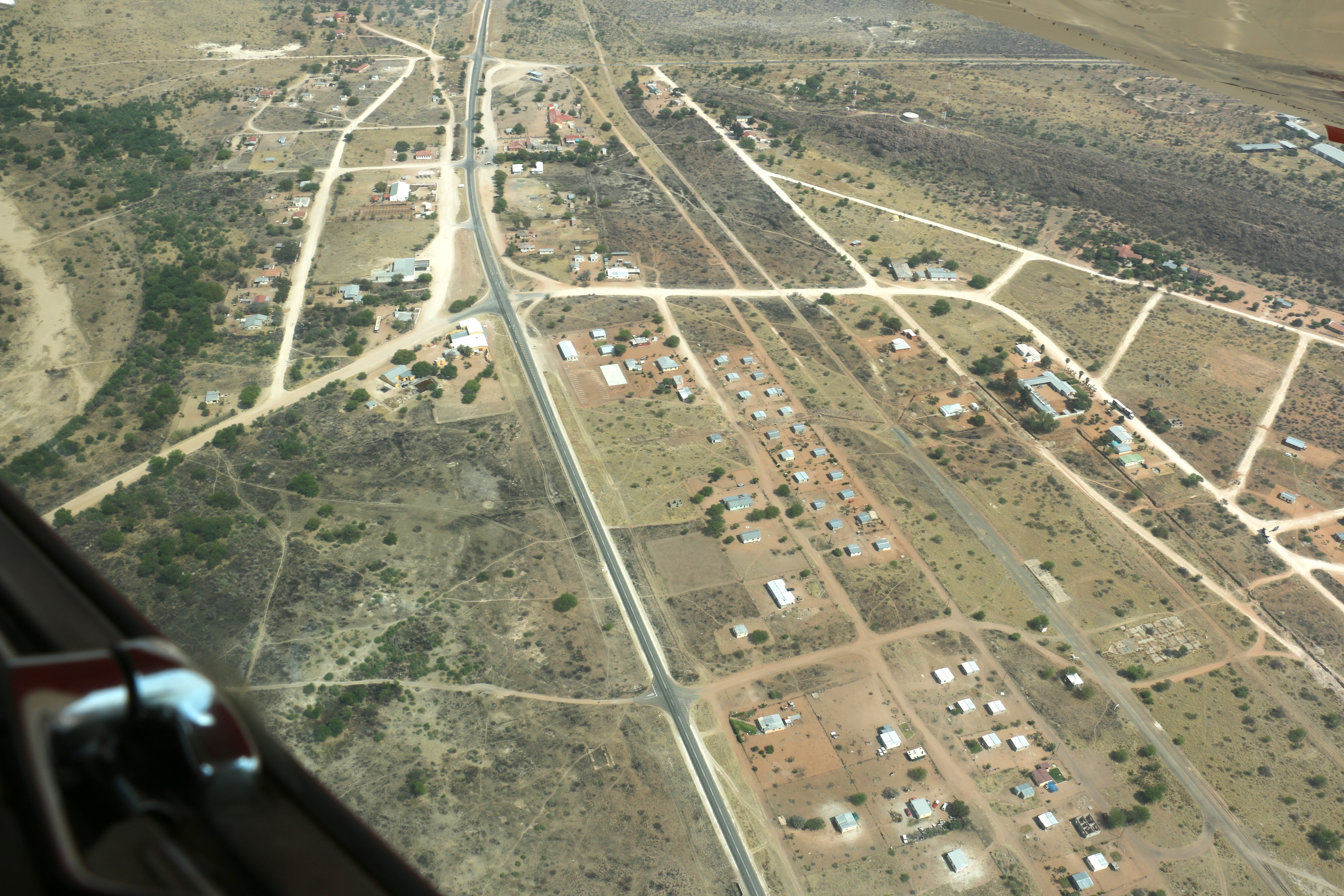
Witvlei aerial view

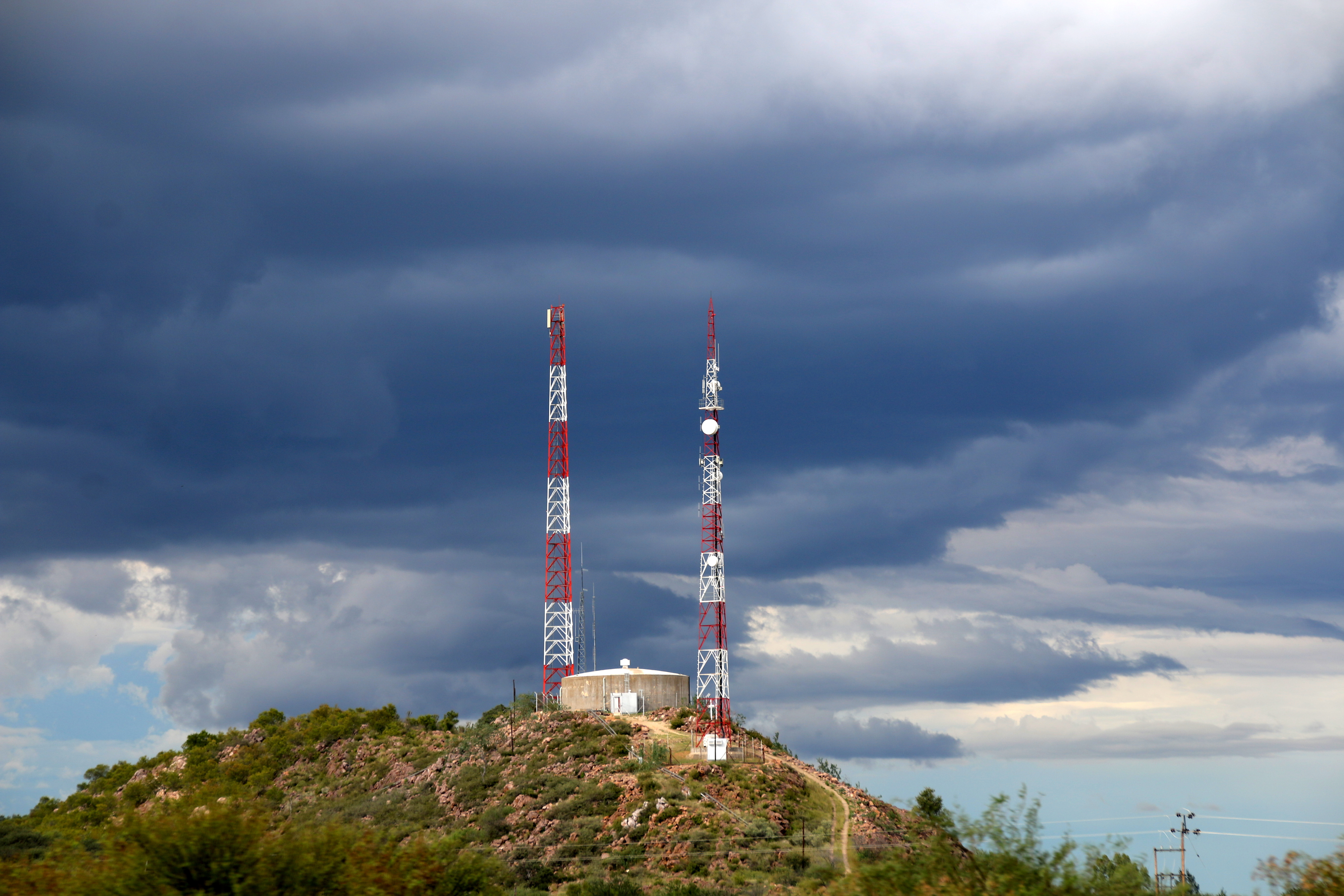
Witvlei radio masts (2018)

Witvlei (the Afrikaans word for white marsh) is a village in the Okarukambe Constituency in the Omaheke Region of central-eastern Namibia. It is known for its meat production and had a population of 2,633 people in 2023.

== Geography ==
Witvlei is situated on the B6 150 km (93 mi) east of Windhoek on the way to Gobabis.

Historical population
Year	Pop.	±% p.a.
2011	1,524	—
2023	2,633	+4.66%

Witvlei receives an average of 317.7 millimetres (12.51 in) of rainfall per year. In the 2010s drought, the lowest figure recorded was 67 millimetres (2.6 in) in the 2018/2019 rainy season.

== History ==
The original name of the village in Khoekhoegowab (Damara/Nama) is ǃUri ǃKhubus (white fountain).

The settlement was the site of the Battle of Witvlei in the First Herero-Nama War in March 1864. Maharero, with the help of the hunter Frederick Green (known among the Ovaherero as Kerina), led a contingent of 1,400 Ovaherero from Otjimbingwe against the Orlam Afrikaners under Jan Jonker Afrikaner. Afrikaner's forces were defeated and they fled, although a number of other battles followed elsewhere.

== Economy and infrastructure ==
Witvlei is known for its meat production. Witvlei Meat was inaugurated in August 2006 and was for several years the only significant employer and taxpayer in the village. The abattoir has a slaughter capacity of 27,000 cattle annually. Financial problems and arguments with Namibia's biggest meat producer MeatCo over the export quota to Norway led to a closure of the abattoir in 2014. It was set to reopen in 2016 but remains closed as of May 2017.

The Witvlei Street Kids Center was inaugurated in the village in 2001. The regional council donated an empty, un-serviced plot to the project in November 2004, and in December 2005 the center was built with money donated by the Suiderhof Dutch Reformed Church congregation and various individuals and companies. Two pre-fabricated houses were transported from Windhoek all the way to Witvlei.

== Politics ==
Witvlei is governed by a village council that has five seats.

The 2010 local authority election was won by SWAPO which gained three seats. One seat each was won by the Rally for Democracy and Progress (RDP) and the United Democratic Front (UDF). SWAPO also gained three seats (344 votes) in the 2015 local authority election. UDF and the Democratic Turnhalle Alliance (DTA) won one seat each with 125 and 72 votes, respectively. SWAPO once again won the 2020 local authority election but lost majority control over the village council. It obtained 260 votes and gained two seats. The Popular Democratic Movement (PDM), formerly DTA, was runner-up with 194 votes and also two seats. The remaining seat went to the Landless People's Movement (LPM), a new party registered in 2018, which won 116 votes.

== People ==
Most of the inhabitants of Witvlei are of Damara descent, but there are also Ovambo, Herero, people from Kavango, a few Ovahimba, and many more inhabitants of mixed ethnicity.
