= Steve Mogotsi =

Namibian boxer and politician

- Born: 26 December 1961 (age 64); Aminuis, Omaheke Region, Namibia
- Occupation: Politician

Stefanus "Steve" Orateng Mogotsi (born 26 December 1961) is a Namibian politician and former featherweight boxer. A member of SWAPO he contested Kalahari Constituency in his native Omaheke Region in regional elections since 1998. In the 2004 regional elections he won and became councillor, and he also was elected to represent Omaheke in the National Council of Namibia.

In 2005 Mogotsi became the first ethnic Tswana to serve in the Cabinet of Namibia when he was appointed deputy minister of Public Works, Transport and Communication in 2005.

== Early life and education ==
Mogotsi was born in Aminuis, Omaheke Region. He joined SWAPO in 1978, while studying at St Joseph's Roman Catholic High School in Döbra. From 1979 to 1987 he worked for South African Railways in Windhoek before taking up work for Consolidated Diamond Mines (CDM) in Oranjemund, ǁKaras Region.

At CDM Mogotsi became involved in politics. He became the shop steward for the Mineworkers Union of Namibia. In 1994, Mogotsi moved permanently back to Omaheke Region, the region of his birth, to become a full-time commercial farmer and building contractor.

== Political career ==
In 1998, Mogotsi contested the Kalahari Constituency, but lost to the Democratic Turnhalle Alliance (DTA) candidate. Six years later, in the 2004 regional elections, Mogotsi won the seat with 1,825 of the 2,989 votes cast. Mogotsi was subsequently elected to the 3rd National Council of Namibia.

In 2005, he was selected to the cabinet of Hifikepunye Pohamba as deputy minister of Public Works, Transport and Communication following the resignation of Paulus Kapia. With this appointment Mogotsi became the first ethnic Tswana to serve in any Namibian cabinet.
