= Okorukambe Constituency =

Electoral constituency in the Omaheke region of eastern Namibia

Coordinates: 21°49′S 18°14′E

Okorukambe Constituency (red) in the Omaheke Region

Okorukambe Constituency, until 2013 Steinhausen Constituency, is an electoral constituency in the Omaheke Region of Namibia. It had 5,818 registered voters in 2020.

Okorukambe Constituency covers an area of 17,457 km^{2} (6,740 sq mi). It had a population of 10,060 in 2011, up from 9,600 in 2001.

Until August 2013 the constituency was named after Steinhausen.

The settlements of Witvlei, Omitara and Summerdown are located within the constituency, also the western part of Epukiro.

== Politics ==
SWAPO politician and deputy Minister of Works and Transport Kilus Nguvauva was the councillor of this constituency from the 1998 regional election. He was reelected in the 2004 regional elections, gaining 1,610 of the 2,903 votes cast, and he also remained councillor after the 2010 regional elections.

The 2015 regional election was likewise won by a SWAPO candidate. Raphael Mokaleng gained 1,898 votes, followed by Emgardt Kandovazu of the Democratic Turnhalle Alliance (DTA) with 352 votes and Eskaline Ganes of the Rally for Democracy and Progress (RDP) with 164 votes. Lukas Mbangu of the All People's Party also ran and got 45 votes.

The SWAPO candidate also won the 2020 regional election. Rocco Nguvauva obtained 1,465 votes, followed by Laurentius Kamanda of the Landless People's Movement (LPM, a new party registered in 2018, 489 votes) and Kavehorere Murangi of the Popular Democratic Movement (PDM, the new name of the DTA) with 482 votes.

== See also ==
- Administrative divisions of Namibia
