= Hanno Rumpf =

Namibian politician and diplomat (1958–2019)

Hanno Burkhard Rumpf (15 September 1958 – 8 February 2019) was a Namibian politician (SWAPO) and diplomat.

== Early life ==
Rumpf, the son of well-known farmer and right-wing National Party member Ernst Rumpf, grew up on the Combumbi parental farm in the community of Steinhausen. He received his secondary education in Swakopmund and studied political science, African history and economics at Rhodes University and Rand Afrikaans University in South Africa. During his studies, Rumpf was active in the progressive student movement and briefly secretary-general of the Namibian student movement. Rumpf was in the early 1980s one of the few white members of SWAPO. Because he did not want to do military service with the South African armed forces, he went into exile in 1984. Until 1987 he was initially a research assistant at the University of Bremen, and later a member of the Namibian Communications Centre in London.

== Career ==
Between 1987 and 1989, Rumpf worked as press spokesman for the SWAPO agency in Bonn. After Namibia's independence, Rumpf served as permanent secretary in the Namibian Ministry of Environment and Tourism (1990–1995), the Ministry of Trade and Industry (1995–1999) and the National Planning Commission (1999–2003). From 2003 to 2006 Rumpf was Namibian ambassador to Germany. He was subsequently ambassador to the Benelux countries, Switzerland and the European Union in Brussels until December 2015.

In 1998, Rumpf was awarded the Federal Cross of Merit 1st Class by the Federal Republic of Germany.
