= Gobabis State Hospital =

Geography
- Location: Gobabis, Omaheke Region, Namibia
- Coordinates: 22.455189°S 18.975910°E

Organisation
- Type: Public

Services
- Emergency department: Yes
- Beds: 150
- Helipad: No

History
- Opened: 1991

Links
- Lists: Hospitals in Namibia

Gobabis State Hospital is a government-run hospital in Gobabis, Omaheke Region, Namibia. It has 150 beds and was completed in 1991.
