= Ramblers F.C. =

Association football club in Windhoek, Namibia

Ramblers
- Full name: Ramblers Football Club
- Nickname(s): Rammies
- Founded: 1945
- Ground: Ramblers Stadium; Windhoek, Namibia
- Capacity: 5,000
- Manager: Jomo Keiseb
- League: Southern Stream First Division
- 2021/2022: SSFD, 4th
Home colours	Away colours

The Ramblers is a Namibian football club from Pionierspark, Windhoek.

== History ==
The Ramblers have played in the country's highest division, the Namibia Premier League and the club was previously known as Windhoek Optics Ramblers. They sold their place in the premier league and now focus on growing talent from children upwards. Through the youth development programs, Ramblers were able to nature talent and build a first team squad currently boasting 25 graduates of the Ramblers Academy, of which 4 went to represent Namibia at the 2021 U20 African Cup Of Nations.

== Women's team ==
In 2019, Ramblers created the women's team. The women's team currently plays in NFA Women's Super League (Namibia's Women's top flight football league)

== Achievements ==
- Namibia Premier League: 1

1992

- NFA-Cup: 1

2005

== Performance in CAF competitions ==
- African Cup of Champions Clubs: 1 appearance

1993: Preliminary Round

== Notable coaches ==
Men's Team

- (Germany) Peter Hyballa (2002–03)
- (Germany) Lutz Pfannenstiel (2009–10)
- (Namibia) Tiro Thabanello
- (Namibia) Benedict's Haoseb (2015–19)
