= Rapama Kamehozu =

Namibian politician

Personal details
- Born: 11 September 1948 Okatokoverua, Otjozondjupa Region
- Died: 23 March 2013 (aged 64)
- Party: SWAPO
- Occupation: Politician

Rapama Kamehozu (circa 1949 – 23 March 2013) was a Namibian politician, teacher, and a member of the SWAPO political party. Kamehozu served as the governor of Otjozondjupa Region from 2011 to 2012 and as governor of Omaheke Region from December 2012 until his death on 23 March 2013.

Kamehozu began his career as a teacher. He served as mayor of Grootfontein and held a series of internal posts within the governing SWAPO political party.

In 2011, Kamehozu was appointed the governor of Otjozondjupa Region by Namibian President Hifikepunye Pohamba. He served as Otjozondjupa governor until December 2012. President Pohamba appointed Kamehozu as the governor of Omaheke Region in December 2012. He succeeded outgoing Omaheke governor Laura McLeod-Katjirua. Kamehozu served as governor of Omaheke from December 2012 until his death in office on 23 March 2013.

Kamehozu died in office from cancer on 23 March 2013, at the Roman Catholic Hospital in Windhoek, Namibia, at the age of 63. He was survived by his wife, Evelyn Kamehozu, and five children. Kamehozu was the second sitting Namibian regional governor to die in office in less than one month; Kavango Region governor Maurus Nekaro also died in office on 4 March 2013. Kamehozu was succeeded by Reverend Samuel Mbambo who was appointed in April 2013.
