= Legare Stadium =

Sports venue in Gobabis, Omaheke Region, Namibia

Coordinates: 22°26′47″S 18°59′15″E

Legare Stadium is a sports venue in Gobabis, Omaheke Region, Namibia. As of 2020 the stadium is dilapidated and not usable as a sports venue.
