= Kalahari Constituency =

Electoral constituency in the Omaheke region of eastern Namibia

Coordinates: 22°16′S 19°59′E

Kalahari constituency (red) in the Omaheke Region of Namibia

Kalahari Constituency (until 1998 Buitepos Constituency) is an electoral constituency in the Omaheke Region of eastern central Namibia. It had 5,294 registered voters in 2020.

The constituency covers an area of 12,248 km^{2} (4,729 sq mi). It had a population of 7,611 in 2011, down from 9,443 in 2001. It contains the rural area east of Gobabis as well as Gobabis' Nossobville suburb. The constituency office had been inaugurated in 2009 and is located at the Ben-Hur settlement. Kalahari constituency forms part of the border between Namibia and Botswana and contains the border post Buitepos for which it previously had been named.

== Politics ==
=== Presidential elections ===
In the 2004 election, 4541 residents were registered voters; 4011 (88%) of registered voters cast valid ballots. Hifikepunye Pohamba of SWAPO Party received 2312 total votes (58%), followed by Katuutire Kaura of the Democratic Turnhalle Alliance (DTA, 11%), Henk Mudge of the Republican Party (RP, 9%), Kuaima Riruako of the National Unity Democratic Organisation (NUDO, 8%), Ben Ulenga of the Congress of Democrats (CoD, 5%), Justus ǁGaroëb of the United Democratic Front (UDF, 4%) and Kosie Pretorius of the Monitor Action Group (MAG, 4%).

=== Regional elections ===
In the 2004 regional elections Steve Mogotsi (SWAPO) was elected councillor with 1,825 of the 2,989 votes cast. The constituency had previously elected a DTA member in 1992 and 1998.

The 2015 regional election was again won by SWAPO. Ignatius Kariseb gained 1,522 votes, followed by Johannes Baumakwe (DTA) with 630 votes. Councillor Kariseb (SWAPO) was reelected in the 2020 regional election, winning with 1,234 votes. Baumakwe of the Popular Democratic Movement (PDM, the new name of the DTA) came second with 390 votes, followed by Maureen du Plessis (NUDO) with 322 votes and Lauretta Dax, an independent candidate, with 230 votes.

== See also ==
- Administrative divisions of Namibia
