= Epukiro Constituency =

Electoral constituency in the Omaheke region of eastern Namibia

Coordinates: 21°42′S 19°7′E

Epukiro constituency (red) in the Omaheke Region of Namibia

Epukiro Constituency is an electoral constituency in the Omaheke Region of Namibia. It had 4,646 registered voters in 2020.

Epukiro Constituency covers an area of 10,927 km^{2} (4,219 sq mi). It had a population of 6,106 in 2011, down from 7,135 in 2001. Its district capital is the settlement of Epukiro Post 3, also known as Omauezonjanda (or Omawewozonyanda), it further contains the settlements of Otjiyarua and Otjimanangombe among others. The royal homestead of the Ovambanderu people is situated in this constituency in the settlement of Ezorongondo.

== Politics ==
In the 2004 regional elections, Brave Uakundja Tjizera of the SWAPO Party was elected with 1,328 of the 2,612 votes cast.

The 2015 regional election was won by Cornelius Kanguatjivi of the with 1,038 votes, followed by Juda Hanyero of the National Unity Democratic Organisation (NUDO) with 882 votes and Nokokurekungudje Nguvauva of the South West Africa National Union (SWANU) with 181 votes. The SWAPO candidate also won the 2020 regional election. Piniel Pakarae obtained 1,445 votes, followed by Sandie Tjaronda, an independent candidate, with 760 votes and Alex Kandetu (NUDO) with 231 votes.

== See also ==
- Administrative divisions of Namibia
