= Katutura State Hospital =

Coordinates: 22°32′05″S 17°03′54″E

Geography
- Location: Katutura Windhoek, Namibia

Organisation
- Care system: Public
- Type: Government-run hospital

Services
- Emergency department: Yes
- Helipad: No

Links
- Lists: Hospitals in Namibia

Katutura State Hospital is a hospital in Katutura, a black township of Windhoek, Namibia. Together with the Windhoek Central Hospital, it is one of two State Hospitals in the Windhoek area, and Namibia's only general referral hospital. In November 2008, the hospital installed a new solar water heating system as part of a major renovation campaign.

== See also ==
- Hulda Shipanga, first black matron of the hospital
