= Rundu State Hospital =

Coordinates: 17.91611°S 19.76735°E

Geography
- Location: Rundu, Namibia, Namibia

Organisation
- Care system: Public

Services
- Emergency department: Yes
- Beds: 300

Helipads
- Helipad: No

Links
- Lists: Hospitals in Namibia

Rundu State Hospital is a government hospital in Rundu, Namibia. Containing 300 beds, it was remodeled from 1991 to 1997.

In 2021, Rundu State Hospital was gifted several ICU beds by USAID. The hospital was also gifted several emergency field beds by Project C.U.R.E., sourced by then Namibian Ambassador to the United States, Margaret Mensah-Williams.
