= Hulda Shipanga =

Namibian nurse

Hulda Kamboi Shipanga (née Ngatjikare; 28 October 1926 – 26 April 2010) was a nurse, midwife, and ministerial adviser to the Namibian Ministry of Health. She was the first black nurse in Namibia to be promoted to matron, the highest rank.

== Biography ==
Born in Aminuis, South-West Africa, and educated in South Africa, first as teacher, then as nurse, she returned to South-West Africa (modern-day Namibia) to work in the Native Hospital in Windhoek. Shipanga studied further to become a midwife, a profession she then conducted at Windhoek's Old Location, a segregated area for black residents. On 10 December 1959, the day of the Old Location Uprising, she was one of three nurses attending to the wounded when doctors (all white at that time due to the restrictions of the Bantu Education Act) at the hospitals in Windhoek refused to treat them.

After further qualifying as theatre nurse and specialising in paediatrics and orthopaedics in the United Kingdom, she was the highest qualified nurse in the twilight days of South-West Africa and during the period of the interim government in Namibia. Shortly after Namibian Independence she was the first black nurse to be promoted to the rank of Matron − before, such promotion was discouraged by Apartheid laws. She served in this position at Katutura State Hospital until her retirement.

Founding president Sam Nujoma appointed her as special advisor to the Minister of Health Nickey Iyambo although Shipanga was already of pensionable age. She later also served under Libertine Amathila, Namibias second Minister of Health.

At the age of 74, she returned to Aminuis to farm. Shipanga was married twice and had no children. She died in 2010 in Windhoek.
