= Ramblers Stadium =

Football stadium in Windhoek, Namibia

Coordinates: 22°59′03″S 17°07′19″E

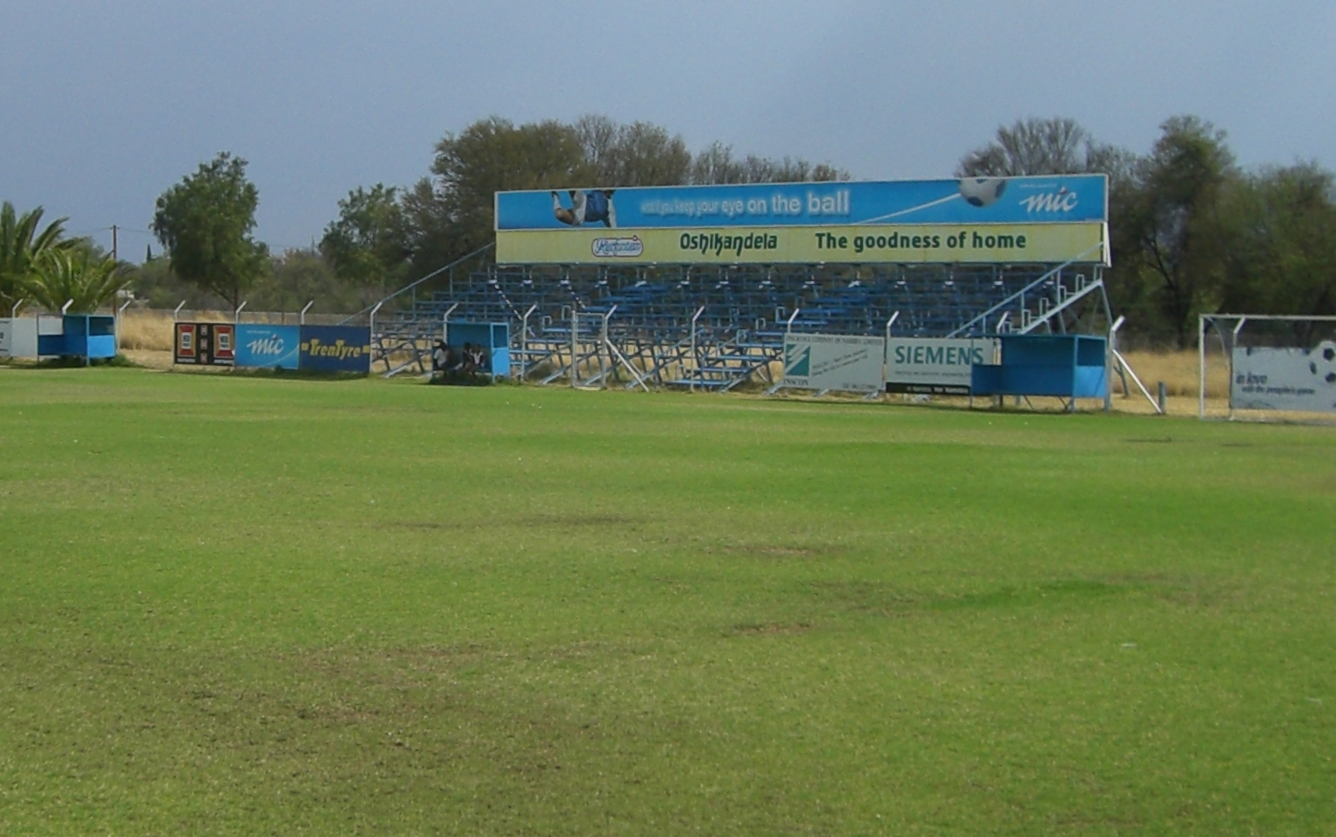
- Interactive map of Ramblers Stadium
- Location: Windhoek, Namibia
- Capacity: 1,000
- Type: Football stadium

The Ramblers Stadium is a football stadium in Windhoek, Namibia. It is the home of the Ramblers F.C. club and it has a capacity of 1,000 people.

It has hosted the Windhoek U21 football tournament in 2025 and 2026.
