= Tswanaland =

Bantustan in South West Africa (1980–1989)

- 1980–1989
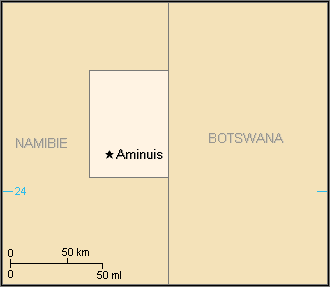
- Map of the Bantustan
- Status: Bantustan; Second-tier authority (1980–1989)
- Capital: Aminuis
- History
  - Established: 1980
  - Re-integrated into Namibia: May 1989
- Currency: South African rand
Preceded by	Succeeded by
South West Africa	Namibia

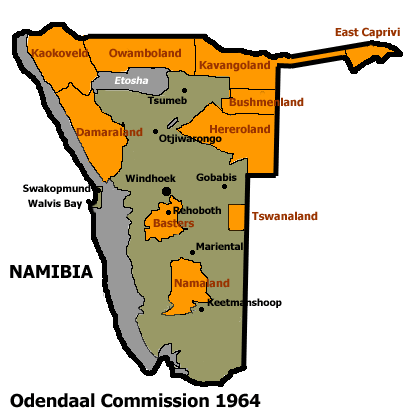
Allocation of land to Bantustans according to the Odendaal Plan. Tswanaland is the rectangle in eastern central South West Africa.

Tswanaland was a Bantustan and then later a non-geographic ethnic-based second-tier authority, the Representative Authority of the Tswanas, in South West Africa (present-day Namibia), in the far central eastern area of the territory around the village of Aminuis. It was intended by the apartheid government to be a self-governing homeland for the Tswana people.

== Administrative history ==
=== Bantustan ===
Tswanaland was established as a homeland for Tswana people in South West Africa. However, unlike all other homelands, it was never implemented that way. Herero people were allowed to stay in the area, and Tswanas remained a minority.

=== Representative authority (1980–1989) ===
Following the Turnhalle Constitutional Conference the system of Bantustans was replaced in 1980 by Representative Authorities which functioned on the basis of ethnicity only and were no longer based on geographically defined areas.

The Representative Authority of the Tswanas had executive and legislative competencies, being made up of elected Legislative Assemblies which would appoint Executive Committees led by chairmen.

As second-tier authorities, the Representative Authorities had responsibility for land tenure, agriculture, education up to primary level, teachers' training, health services, and social welfare and pensions and their Legislative Assemblies had the ability to pass legislation known as Ordinances.

=== Transition to independence (1989–1990) ===
Tswanaland, like the other homelands in South West Africa, was abolished in May 1989 at the start of the transition to independence.

== Leadership ==
Constance Kgosiemang, an ethnic Tswana, was political leader between 1980 and 1989.

== Gallery ==
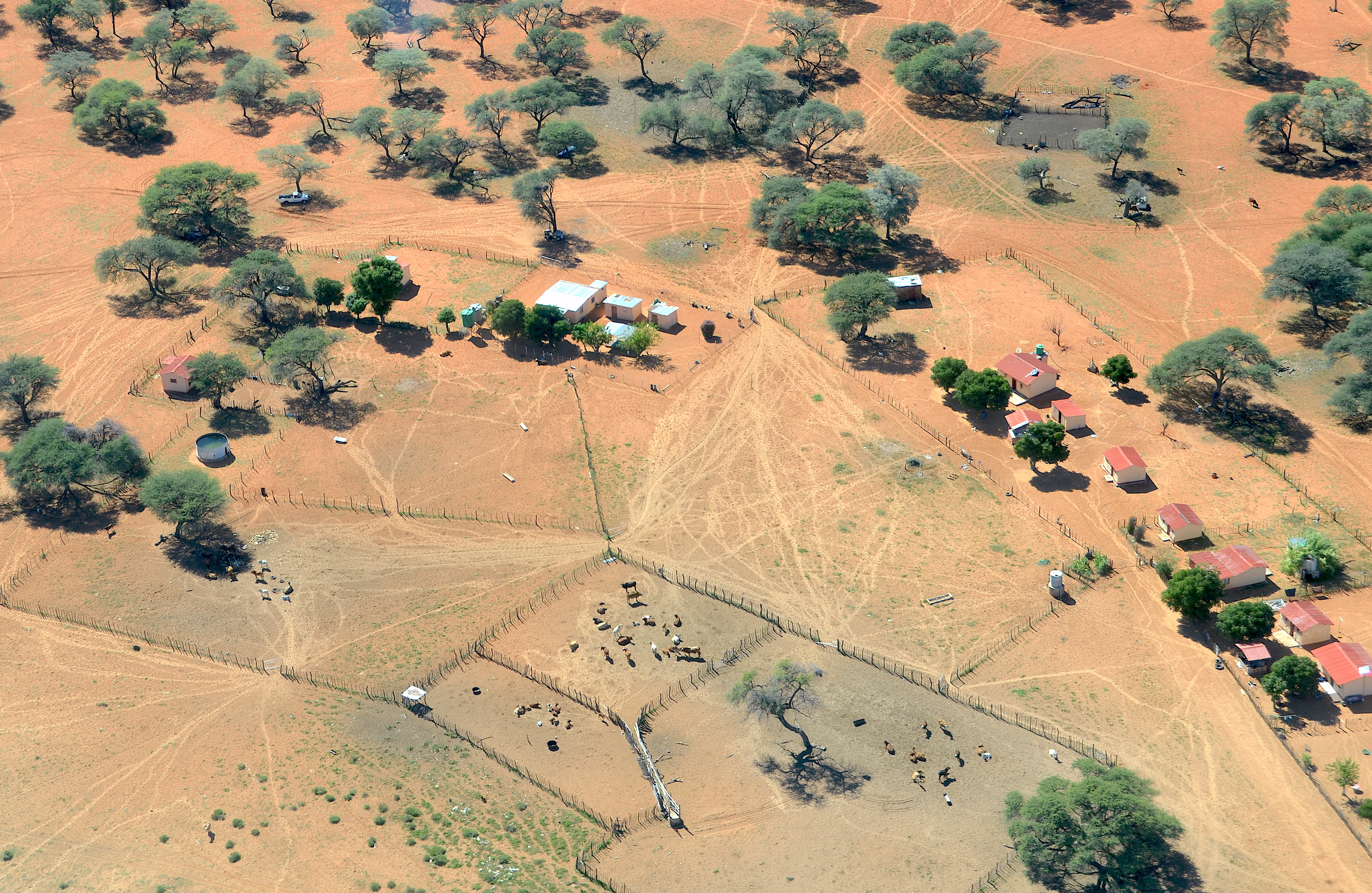
Aroams Oos in Tswanaland (2017) 23.053451°S 19.644827°E

== See also ==
- Apartheid
- Bophuthatswana
