= Otjinene Constituency =

Electoral constituency in the Omaheke region of eastern Namibia

- Constituency
- Otjinene constituency (red) in the Omaheke Region of Namibia
- Coordinates: 21.224485°S 18.984444°E
- Country: Namibia
- Region: Omaheke Region
- Constituency: Otjinene Constituency

Area
  - Total: 6,420 km^{2} (2,480 sq mi)
- Elevation: 1,092 m (3,583 ft)

Population (2011)
  - Total: 7,306
  - Density: 1.14/km^{2} (2.95/sq mi)
- Time zone: UTC+2 (SAST)
- Area code: +66

Otjinene Constituency is an electoral constituency in the Omaheke Region of Namibia. It had 5,619 registered voters in 2020. Its district capital is the village of Otjinene.

Otjinene Constituency covers an area of 6,420 km^{2} (2,480 sq mi). It had a population of 7,306 in 2011, down from 7,790 in 2001.

== Politics ==
Otjinene is one of the few Namibian constituencies that are not dominated by the SWAPO Party. In the 2004 regional elections, Esegiël Nguvitjita Toromba of the National Unity Democratic Organisation (NUDO) was elected with 1,508 of the 2,872 votes cast.

The 2015 regional election was won by Erwin Katjizeu (NUDO) with 1,529 votes, followed by Nono Katjingisiua (SWAPO) with 965 votes. Albert Kandjii of the Democratic Turnhalle Alliance (DTA) finished third with 261 votes, followed by Issaskar Hiakaere of the South West Africa National Union (SWANU) with 78 votes. Councillor Katjizeu (NUDO) was reelected in the 2020 regional election, winning with 1,650 votes. Edmund Meroro (SWAPO) came second with 390 votes, followed by Dave Ndjavera of the Popular Democratic Movement (PDM, the new name of the DTA) with 381 votes.
