= Keharanjo Nguvauva =

Paramount Chief of Ovambanderu (1984–2011)

Keharanjo II Xavier Komavau Nguvauva
- The late Paramount Chief of Ovambanderu
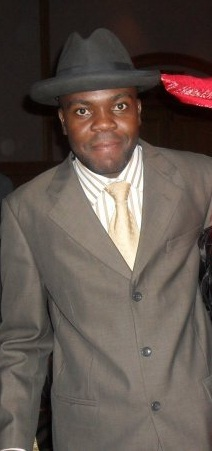
- Born: 12 October 1984; Gobabis
- Died: 8 April 2011 (aged 26); Khomasdal, Windhoek, Namibia
- Burial: 23 April 2011 at Ongango near Opuwo in the Kunene Region.
Names
- Keharanjo II Xavier Komavu Nguvauva
- House: Ovambanderu
- Father: Munjuku Nguvauva II
- Mother: Aletta Karikondua Nguvauva

Keharanjo II Xavier Komavau Nguvauva (12 October 1984 – 8 April 2011) was the youngest Chief of the Ovambanderu, a Herero clan in Namibia. Keharanjo was born to the Ovambanderu family to the then Chief Munjuku Nguvauva II and his wife Aletta Karikondua Nguvauva. He was reported dead on the evening of Friday 8 April 2011 in the residential area of Khomasdal, Windhoek where he committed suicide using an electric wire.

== Education ==
Keharanjo began primary school in Botswana. He passed primary and moved on to Sepopa CJSS for his Junior Certificate until he completed his Form Five from Maun Senior Secondary School. Keharanjo graduated with an LLB from the University of Western Cape in Cape Town, South Africa in 2010. He was employed as a legal advisor in the Namibian Ministry of Justice.

== Early life ==
Keharanjo just like an ordinary Mbanderu young boy, he spent his early years tending his father’s livestock at Ezorongondo, Omaheke Region. In 1988, his father took him to Ondauha in Botswana, about 180 kilometres (110 mi) from Maun, to the grave of Keharanjo’s grandfather, Chief Keharanjo I Nguvauva. There he was introduced to the Mbanderu community as a future chief. Nguvauva was then taken to the house of Chief Mathiba Moremi of Batawana, for him to be groomed to be a leader. He was also left in the care of Manuel Nguvauva, brother to Kilus Nguvauva and half-brother to Keharanjo.

He was in tussle fight of succeeding his father, the late Munjuku Nguvauva II, with his half-brother Kilus Nguvauva who is currently Deputy Minister of Mines and Energy. The succession dispute amongst the two half-brothers caused division in the Ovambanderu community. The Namibian government once issued an investigation into the succession disagreement between the two half-brothers which and concluded that Keharanjo is the rightful and legitimate heir to the throne.

After Keharanjo's suicide the succession battle reignited, this time between Kilus Nguvauva and Aletha Nguvauva who was crowned queen by one of the OvaMbanderu faction.

Only late in 2014 was a decision reached when government decided not to appeal a High Court decision in favor of Kilus Nguvauva.

Preceded by Munjuku Nguvauva II	Chief of the Ovambanderu people 2008–2011	Succeeded by Kilus Nguvauva
