= Nikanor Hoveka =

Namibian tribal chief

Nikanor Hoveka (ca. 1875–1951) was chief of the Ovambanderu, a Herero clan in Namibia (then South West Africa).

He succeeded his father Kanangati Hoveka in 1896 as chief of the Ovambanderu. This came at the time when Imperial Germany had just begun to colonise the area and to establish German South-West Africa. When the Herero and Namaqua War of 1904–1907 broke out, Hoveka fought against the Germans. In 1905 he was interned at Otjihaenena concentration camp near Okatumba.

After World War I Hoveka became engaged in early Pan-Africanism. He was one of the first Namibians to support and spread this idea and helped to set up the Windhoek office of the Universal Negro Improvement Association (UNIA) in 1922.

In April 1946, the South African administration of South-West Africa held a referendum among the indigenous population to gather support for an incorporation of the area as its fifth province. The referendum was worded in a deceiving way, offering choices "to join the Chinese, the Russians, or even the British", blurring the real issue of surrendering their territory to the South Africans. The referendum went in favour of the South Africans but was rejected by the UN General Assembly. Nikanor Hoveka and Hosea Kutako were the first to petition the United Nations about this issue.

Nikanor Hoveka died in 1951. He was succeeded as chief of the Ovambanderu by Stephanus Hoveka.
