= Laura McLeod-Katjirua =

Namibian politician

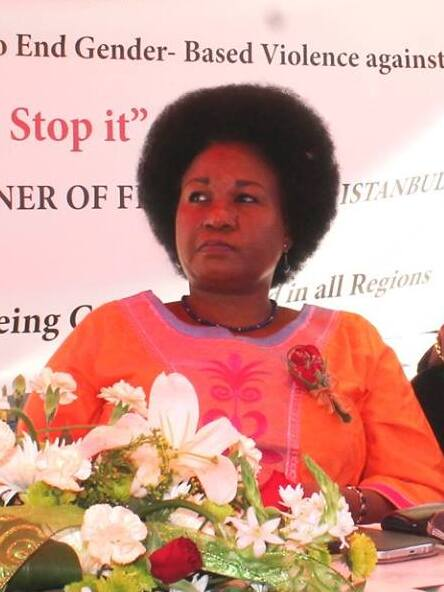
- Leod-Katjirua in 2015

Governor of the Khomas Region
- In office 2012–2025
- Preceded by: Sophia Shaningwa
- Succeeded by: Sam Nujoma jr.

Governor of Omaheke Region
- In office 2001–2012
- Preceded by: Paulo Thataone
- Succeeded by: Rapama Kamehozu

SWAPO Deputy Secretary-General
- In office 2012–2017
- Succeeded by: Marco Hausiku

Personal details
- Born: Laura McLeod Windhoek, Namibia
- Party: SWAPO
- Education: United Nations Institute for Namibia
- Occupation: Teacher
- Profession: Politician
- Committees: SWAPO Central Committee

Laura Veendapi McLeod-Katjirua is a Namibian politician who was a Governor of the Khomas Region from 2012 to 28 March 2025 and Deputy Secretary General of SWAPO since 2012. Previously she was Governor of Omaheke Region from 2001 to 2012. She was transferred to Khomas Region by President Hifikepunye Pohamba after she was elected as Deputy Secretary General of SWAPO on December 2, 2012.

== Early life and education ==
Laura McLeod grew up in Gobabis, the regional capital of Omaheke. She went into Zambian exile in 1975 while she still was a teenager and completed her secondary education there at Nyango Education Centre in 1978. She graduated with a diploma in Public Administration from the United Nations Institute for Namibia, and with a Teacher's Diploma from the National Institute for Public Administration in 1982, both located in Lusaka. McLeod then stayed in Botswana, Angola, and East Germany and returned to Namibia in 1989. Upon Namibian independence in 1990, she worked as an agricultural technician.

== Political career ==
McLeod was elected Regional Councillor for Omaheke Region in 2001, and Governor in 2002. She was the first female Governor of Omaheke. In the same year she was elected to the SWAPO Central Committee. In December 2012 she was elected as SWAPO Deputy Secretary-General, a position considered number four in the SWAPO hierarchy.

== Private life ==
McLeod-Katjirua has one son and one daughter.
