= Kahimemua Nguvauva =

Former Ovambanderu leader and chief

- The late leader of Ovambanderu people and deputy chief of Namibia's Traditional Leaders Council. He was Chief of the Botswana Mbanderu group in 1951.
- Born: (c. 1850 – 11 June 1896); Musorakuumba
- House: Ovambanderu
- Father: Munjuku Nguvauva

Kahimemua Nguvauva (c. 1850 – 11 June 1896) was chief of the Ovambanderu, a Herero clan in Namibia (then German South West Africa).

== Life ==
Nguvauva was born at Musorakuumba, a settlement near Okahandja, and became chief of the Mbanderu in 1880, succeeding his father Munjuku Nguvauva. During his chieftaincy, Nguvauva was involved in constant hostilities with fellow Herero chiefs. He also was an outspoken opponent of the encroaching settlers of Imperial Germany. The Germans supported Samuel Maharero to become Paramount Chief, and when his competitors, among them Nikodemus Kavikunua and Nguvauva, did not accept this, they were stripped of their chieftaincy.

Nguvauva's resistance eventually led to skirmishes with the German Schutztruppe, the protection force deployed in the colony. He sent his son Hiatuvao Nguvauva with several followers to Ngamiland (part of present-day Botswana), starting an exodus of Ovaherero from South West Africa to Botswana that only ended after the Herero and Nama genocide of 1904—1908.

In May 1896 in the Battle of Sturmfeld, Nguvauva was wounded and surrendered. Accused of organising the uprising against the Germans he was sentenced to death and executed in Okahandja. Sources place the day of execution on June 11, 12, or 13. His tombstone puts the date of death on 11 June 1896.

== Recognition ==
Kahimemua Nguvauva is one of nine national heroes of Namibia that were identified at the inauguration of the country's Heroes' Acre near Windhoek. Founding president Sam Nujoma remarked in his inauguration speech on 26 August 2002 that:

Chief Kahimemua Nguvauva's strong beliefs and convictions drew the anger of the German colonialists who decided to physically eliminate him. This led to intense battles with the German Colonial forces. In 1896, Chief Nguvauva was executed by the German colonial soldiers at Okahandja, because of his fierce resistance to colonialism and foreign occupation. [...] To his revolutionary spirit and his visionary memory we humbly offer our honor and respect.

Nguvauva is honoured in form of a granite tombstone with his name engraved and his portrait plastered onto the slab. Nguvauva's grave in Okahandja was declared a National Monument in 1980.

Preceded by Munjuku Nguvauva	Chief of the Ovambanderu people 1880–1896	Succeeded by Nikanor Hoveka
