= Constance Kgosiemang =

Namibian Tswana paramount chief and politician

Constance Letang Kgosiemang (5 April 1946 – 16 August 2012) was the paramount chief of the Tswana people in Namibia, a parliamentarian, and the leader of the Seoposengwe Party until its merger into the Democratic Turnhalle Alliance (DTA).

Kgosiemang was born on 5 August 1946 in Aminuis. He was related to chief Morwe, the Tswana leader from Kuruman (South Africa) who founded the Tswana minority in South-West Africa. Kgosiemang became Kgosikgolo (chief) of this group on 28 April 1979 at a ceremony in Gobabis. In this position he also led the Tswana Alliance, a group participating at the Turnhalle Constitutional Conference in Windhoek between 1975 and 1977. He oversaw the name change from Tswana Alliance to Seoposengwe Party and its fusion into the Democratic Turnhalle Alliance in 1980.

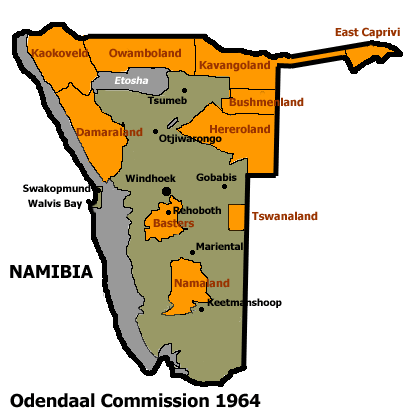
Allocation of land to bantustans according to the Odendaal Plan. Tswanaland is the rectangle in eastern central South-West Africa

When the apartheid government of South Africa devised the Odendaal Plan in the 1960s, Tswanaland was one of the planned bantustans, intended to be a self-governing homeland for the Tswana people. Unlike all other homelands, it was never implemented that way. The Ovaherero were allowed to stay in the area, and the Tswana remained a minority. Kgosimang was the political leader of this entity between 1980 and 1989.

In the twilight days of South-West Africa, Kgosiemang was a member of the Constituent Assembly of Namibia, and after Namibian independence he became a member of Namibia's first parliament. He served until 1993, when pressure from his Tswana community forced him to resign and concentrate on his duties as traditional leader. He later joined ruling SWAPO but never returned to the National Assembly. Constance Kgosiemang died of a heart attack on 16 August 2012.
