= Roman Catholic Hospital =

Coordinates: 22.5641°S 17.0820°E

The Roman Catholic Hospital

Geography
- Location: Windhoek, Namibia

Organisation
- Care system: private
- Type: Government-run hospital
- Affiliated university: Finnish Missionary Society

Services
- Emergency department: Yes
- Beds: 87 beds in 2007.

Helipads
- Helipad: No

History
- Founded: 1907

Links
- Lists: Hospitals in Namibia

The Roman Catholic Hospital is a private hospital in Windhoek, Namibia run by the Roman Catholic Church. Founded in 1907 by the Benedictine Missionary Sisters of Tutzing, the Roman Catholic Hospital had 87 beds in 2007.
