= Ezorongondo =

Ezorongondo is a settlement in the Epukiro Constituency in the Omaheke Region in Namibia. The village is the seat of the Ovambanderu royal house.

The word can also refer to the city of Walvis Bay in the Herero language.
