= Windhoek Central Hospital =

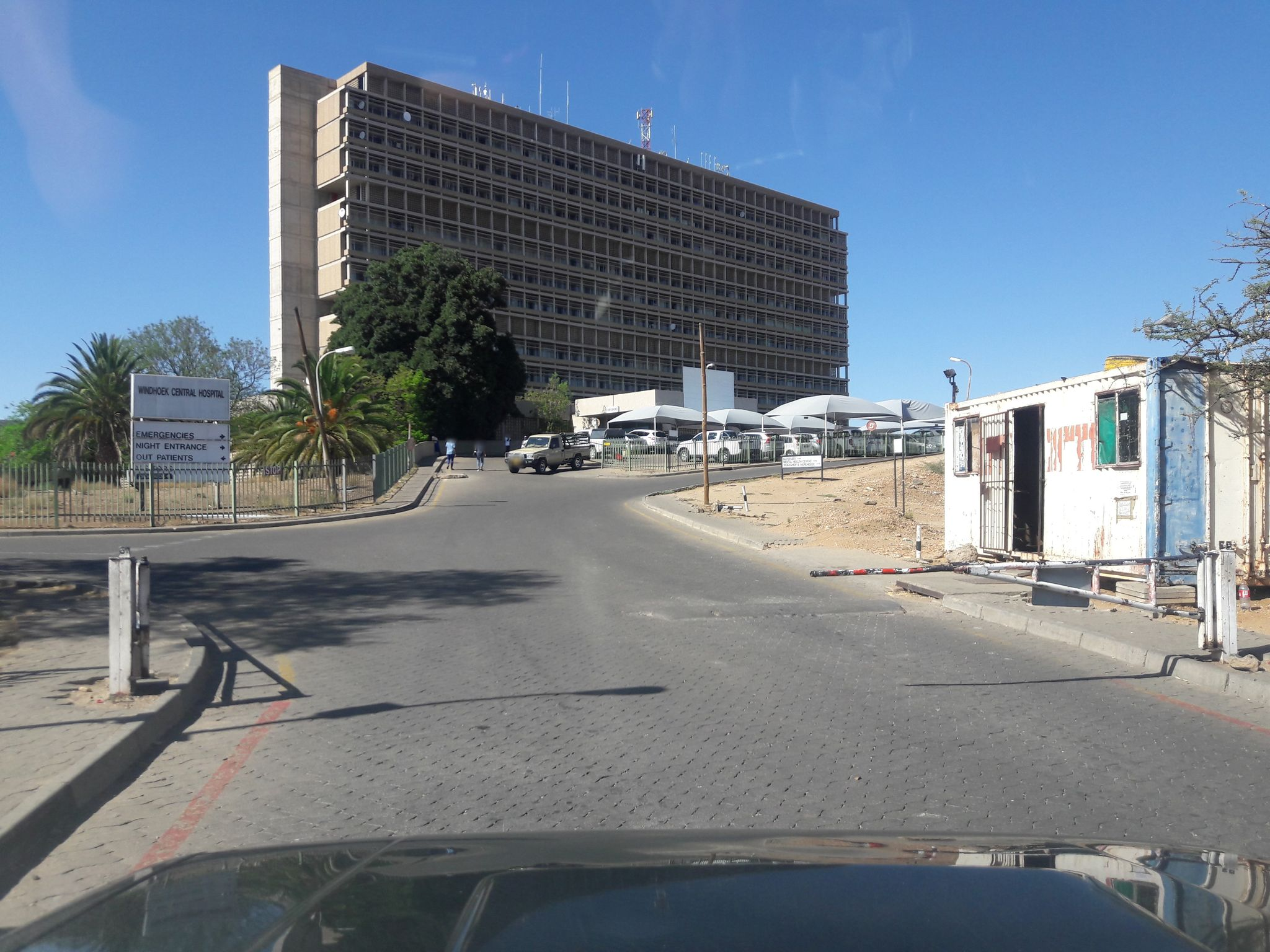
- Windhoek Central Hospital

Geography
- Location: Katutura,Florence Nightingdale Street, Windhoek, Khomas Region, Namibia
- Coordinates: 22°33′13″S 17°4′17″E

Organisation
- Care system: Public
- Type: Government-run hospital

Services
- Emergency department: Yes
- Beds: 855

Helipads
- Helipad: No

History
- Founded: 1984

Links
- Website: www.wch.gov.na
- Lists: Hospitals in Namibia

Windhoek Central Hospital is a public hospital in Windhoek, Namibia. Together with the Katutura State Hospital, it is one of two State Hospitals in the city. The hospital was commissioned in 1982, and opened in 1984.
