= 1998 Namibian local and regional elections =

Namibian elections

Namibia held two subnational elections in 1998. Local Authority Council elections were held on 16 February 1998. Regional Council elections were held from 30 November to 1 December 1998. SWAPO again emerged as the party that gained control of a clear majority of Local Authority Councils and Regional Councils.

== Results ==
=== Local Authority Councils ===
Party	Votes	%	Seats	+/–
SWAPO	36,967	58.78	187	+3
Democratic Turnhalle Alliance	16,026	25.48	99	–17
Local Associations	5,167	8.22	16	+15
United Democratic Front	4,191	6.66	26	+8
Democratic Coalition of Namibia	332	0.53	2	New
SWANU	142	0.23	0	–1
Workers Revolutionary Party	63	0.10	0	0
Total	62,888	100.00	330	+10
Valid votes	62,888	98.97		
Invalid/blank votes	655	1.03		
Total votes	63,543	100.00		
Registered voters/turnout	188,302	33.75		

=== Regional Councils ===
A total of 738,870 voters were registered, but 204,592 were in uncontested constituencies.

Party	Votes	%	Seats	+/–
SWAPO	145,196	69.58	82	+11
Democratic Turnhalle Alliance	51,118	24.50	16	–5
United Democratic Front	9,511	4.56	4	+1
Federal Convention of Namibia	366	0.18	0	0
Independents	2,485	1.19	0	0
Total	208,676	100.00	102	+7
Valid votes	208,676	97.77		
Invalid/blank votes	4,757	2.23		
Total votes	213,433	100.00		
Registered voters/turnout	534,278	39.95		
