= Gobabis =

Town in eastern Namibia

Gobabis Otjiherero: Epako Khoekhoe: ǂKhoandabes
- City
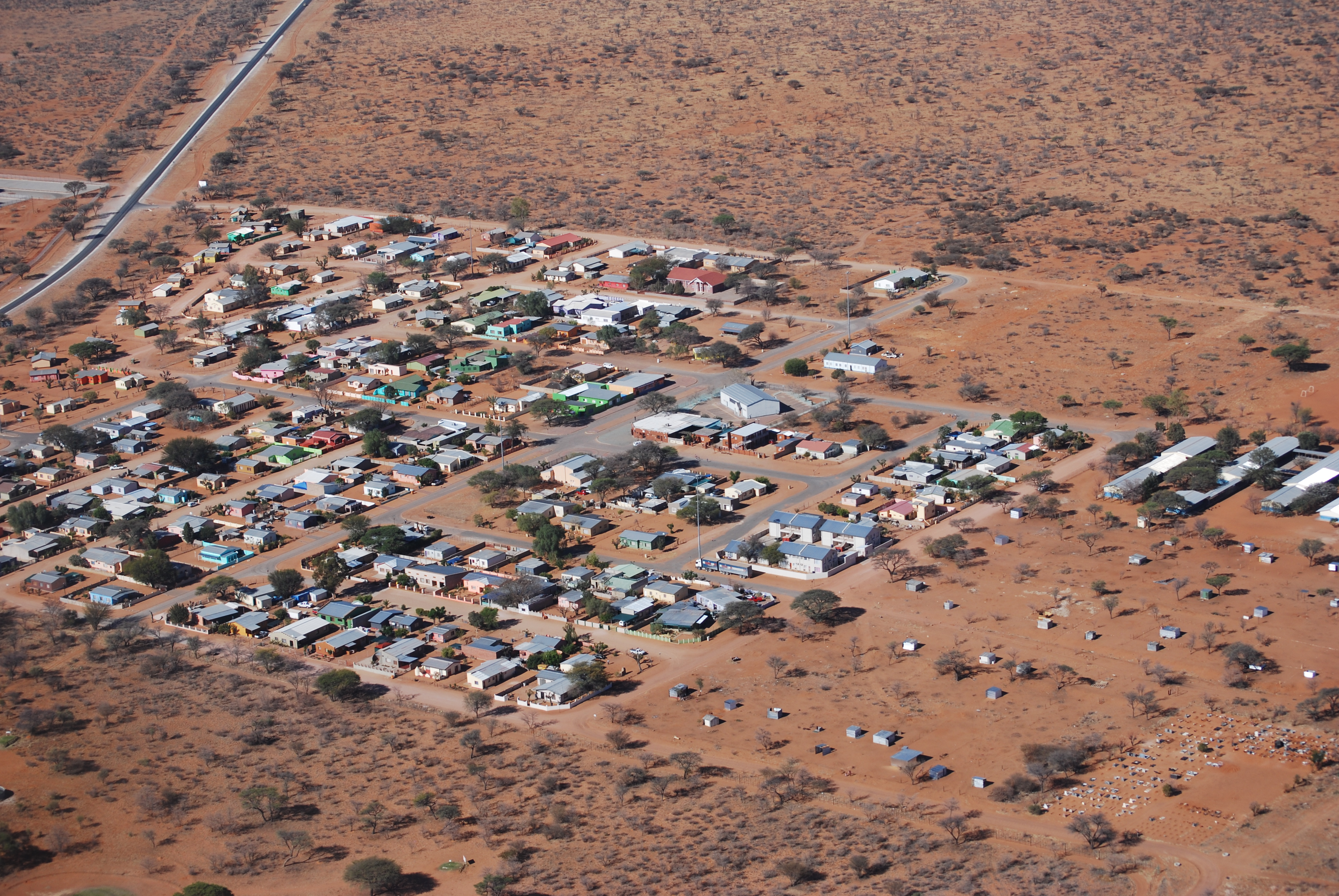
- Aerial view in 2019

- Coat of arms
- Mottoes: Ex Oriente Lux
- Location in Namibia
- Coordinates: 22°26′S 18°58′E
- Country: Namibia
- Region: Omaheke Region
- Constituency: Gobabis Constituency; Kalahari Constituency
- Established: 1856

Government
  - Mayor: Elwin Gariseb (SWAPO)
  - Deputy Mayor: Dina Fillemon (SWAPO)

Area
  - Total: 133 sq mi (345 km^{2})
- Elevation: 4,720 ft (1,440 m)

Population (2023)
  - Total: 33,418
  - Density: 251/sq mi (96.9/km^{2})
- Time zone: UTC+2 (SAST)
- Climate: BSh
- Website: https://gobabis.org

Gobabis (Otjiherero: Epako, Khoekhoe: ǂKhoandabes) is a town in eastern Namibia. It is the regional capital of the Omaheke Region, and the administrative seat of the Gobabis electoral constituency. Gobabis is in the heart of the cattle farming area. It had a population of 33,418 people in 2023.

== History ==
=== Etymology and pre-colonial history ===
The area around Gobabis and along the Nossob River had a strong population of elephants. The settlement itself was a base camp for ivory hunters and a trading post for elephant tusks.

In 1856, a mission station was established by one Friederich Eggert of the Rhenish Missionary Society. In the latter half of the 19th century and the early 20th century, several conflicts flared up between the Ovambanderu and the Khauas Khoikhoi, as well as between the settlers and the indigenous people. Gobabis is in an area where the Herero and the Nama people fought wars against one another, as well as with settlers from the Cape colony that occupied the land.

According to oral tradition, the earliest name for the settlement in this area was the Khoekhoegowab word ǂKhoandabes, the place where the elephant came to lick. The reason for this name is speculated to be that elephant tusks that would crack in the dry and hot climate of the Omaheke were at times stored right in the settlement's well. The Herero called the place Epako.

Later the settlement was referred to as "Gobabis" by the Whites, this expression was likely derived from goba (argue, quarrel) and bis (place): The place where people quarreled. A common earlier interpretation of the name, ǂkhoa (Elephant) -bes (place), Elephant fountain, was introduced by Heinrich Vedder and gained wide acceptance. Vedder also opined that it was Amraal Lambert, Captain of the Kaiǀkhauan (Khauas Nama) who called the place Gobabis because he could not pronounce ǂKoabes. Apart from linguistic problems, this interpretation was contradicted by an 1845 letter by Reverend Joseph Tindall, a Wesleyan missionary, which states: "Reached Gobabis which I named 'Elephant's fountain'" - a place name like "Place of Altercation" would not bode too well for the missionary station he intended to establish.

=== Colonial ===
The Gobabis district was proclaimed by the German authorities in February 1894 and in June the following year Gobabis was occupied by a German garrison. While the military fort, built in 1896–1987, has long since disappeared, one of the few buildings dating back to that era is the 1896 Gobabis Lazarett, which has been declared a national monument in 1974.

== Geography ==
Gobabis is situated 200 km (120 mi) down the B6 motorway from Windhoek to Botswana. The town is 113 km (70 mi) from the Buitepos border post with Botswana, and serves as an important link to South Africa on the tarred Trans-Kalahari Corridor. Gobabis also has its own local airport.

=== Demographics ===
Historical population
Year	Pop.	±% p.a.
2001	13,856	—
2011	19,101	+3.26%
2023	33,418	+4.77%

=== Climate ===
Gobabis has a semi-arid climate (BSh, according to the Köppen climate classification), with hot summers and cool winters (with mild days and chilly nights). The average annual precipitation is 370 mm (15 in).

Climate data for Gobabis, Namibia
Month	Jan	Feb	Mar	Apr	May	Jun	Jul	Aug	Sep	Oct	Nov	Dec	Year
Mean daily maximum °C (°F)	31.4 (88.5)	31.0 (87.8)	30.1 (86.2)	27.9 (82.2)	25.6 (78.1)	22.0 (71.6)	21.9 (71.4)	25.4 (77.7)	29.0 (84.2)	31.0 (87.8)	32.1 (89.8)	32.3 (90.1)	28.3 (82.9)
Mean daily minimum °C (°F)	18.5 (65.3)	17.6 (63.7)	15.9 (60.6)	12.4 (54.3)	7.7 (45.9)	3.8 (38.8)	3.2 (37.8)	5.6 (42.1)	10.3 (50.5)	14.0 (57.2)	16.4 (61.5)	18.1 (64.6)	12.0 (53.6)
Average precipitation mm (inches)	80.7 (3.18)	86.8 (3.42)	53.7 (2.11)	37.0 (1.46)	6.1 (0.24)	2.7 (0.11)	0.2 (0.01)	0.5 (0.02)	7.7 (0.30)	16.2 (0.64)	37.1 (1.46)	40.6 (1.60)	369.3 (14.54)
Average relative humidity (%)	45	51	54	53	45	44	40	31	27	29	34	37	40.8
Source: Ministry of Works and Transport (Meteorological Service Division) "Ministry of Works & Transport: Tabulation of Climate Statistics for Selected Stations in Namibia" (PDF). 2012.

== Economy and infrastructure ==
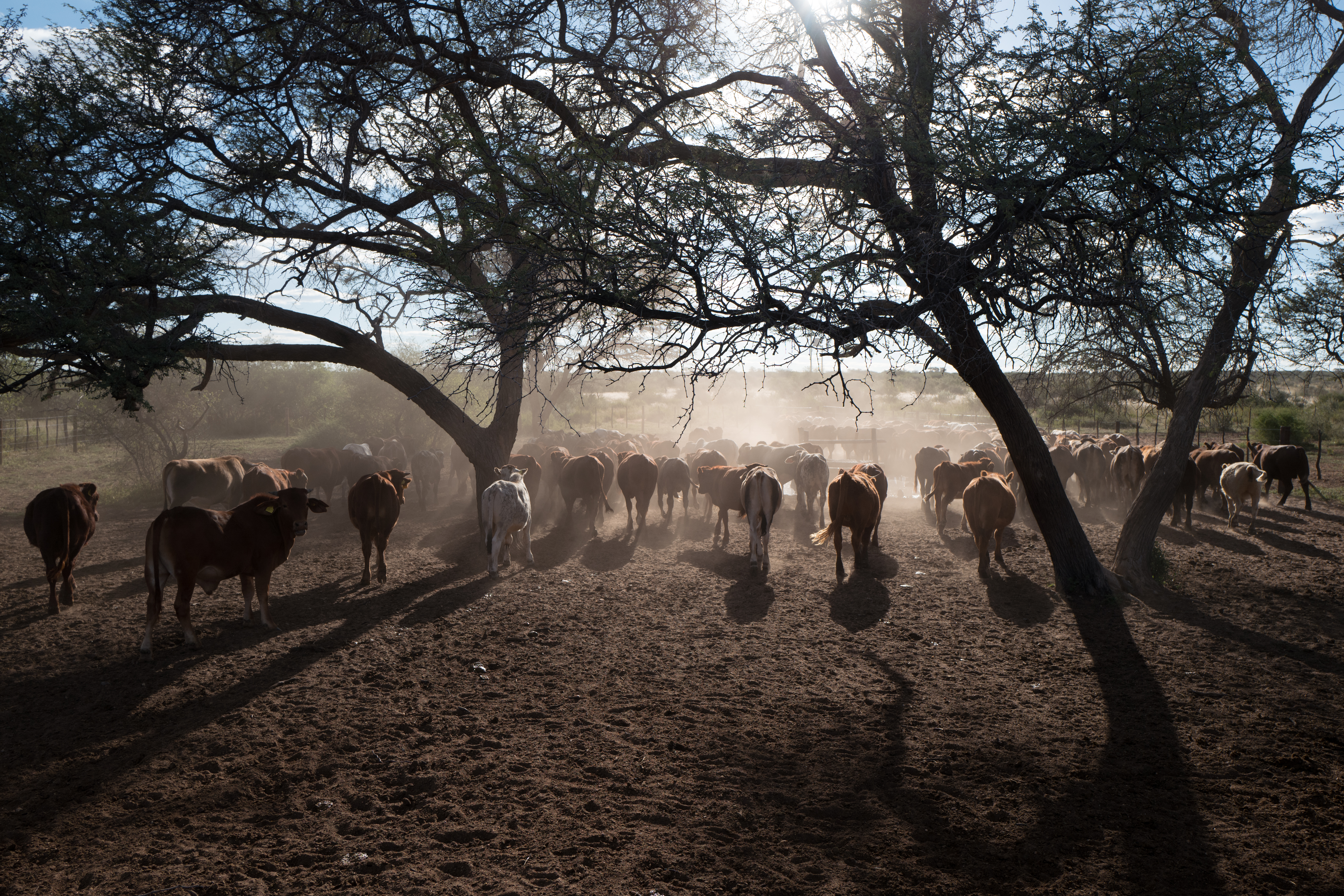
Typical cattle farm near Gobabis

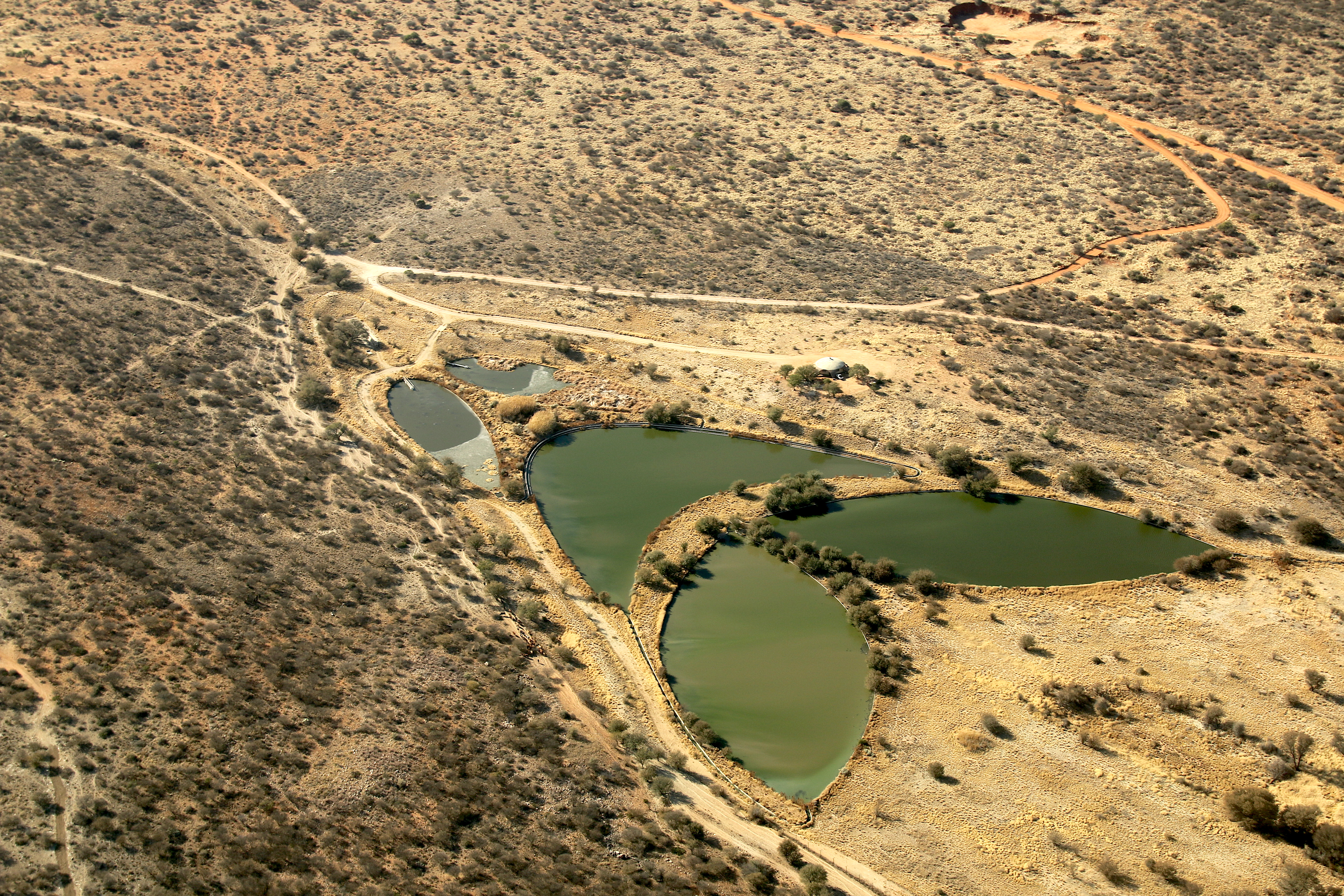
Sewage plant Gobabis (2018)

Gobabis is in the heart of the cattle farming area. A statue of a large Brahman bull with the inscription "Cattle Country" greets visitors to the town.

Gobabis continues to grow as a town due to goods being transported from the mines of landlocked Botswana to the Namibian port of Walvis Bay, and furthermore from consumer goods being imported into Namibia from Gauteng in South Africa. The transport route is known as the Trans-Kalahari Corridor. Gobabis is connected to the Namibian railway system. The passenger train that used to run to the capital Windhoek four times a week no longer takes passengers. The town hosts a state hospital, a state clinic and a private hospital, banking and shopping facilities. Legare Stadium is located in the town.

== Politics ==
=== Local ===
Gobabis is governed by a municipal council that has seven seats. The town has its own local party, the Gobabis Residents' Association (GRA) which won three council seats in the 1998 local authority election and one seat in 2004.

The first local election run after independence of Namibia, the 1992 local elections, was won by SWAPO which obtained 1,398 votes and gained four seats. The Democratic Turnhalle Alliance (DTA) came second with 1,178 votes and three seats. The 1998 local authority elections saw SWAPO win again. It obtained three seats with 925 votes. The local GRA also obtained three seats (655 votes), and the DTA got the remaining seat with 364 votes.

The 2015 local authority election was won by SWAPO which gained 3,077 votes and five seats. One seat each was won by the Democratic Turnhalle Alliance (DTA, 682 votes) and the National Unity Democratic Organisation (NUDO, 153 votes). SWAPO also won the 2020 local authority election but lost majority control over the municipal council. It obtained 1,986 votes and gained three seats. One seat each went to the Landless People's Movement (LPM, a new party registered in 2018, 818 votes), the GRA (681 votes), NUDO (440 votes) and the Popular Democratic Movement (PDM), formerly DTA, with 338 votes.

=== Regional ===
Gobabis is the regional capital of the Omaheke Region. Gobabis Constituency covers most of the town area except for its eastern township of Nossobville which belongs to the Kalahari Constituency.

== Education ==
Gobabis is home to Wennie du Plessis Secondary School, which began as an Afrikaans-medium school. With the government abolition of non-English education after grade 4 at independence, the Afrikaans speaking community endeavoured to start a private school, and the Gobabis Gymnasium came into existence in January 2000 with 67 students from grades 8 to 11 and 6 teachers. In January 2002, 122 students were enrolled, and on 2 December 2004 the school was registered to teach grades 1 to 12. Primary school education officially was started in January 2005.

The Omaheke Regional Library is situated in town between the Epako suburb and Legare Stadium.

== Partner cities ==
- Smallingerland, Netherlands

== Residents ==
- Laura McLeod-Katjirua, former Omaheke Regional Governor and SWAPO Deputy Secretary-General
- Keharanjo Nguvauva, Paramount Chief of the Ovambanderu
- Shafimana Ueitele, lawyer
