= Omaheke Region =

Coordinates: 22°00′S 19°30′E

- Region
- Location of the Omaheke Region in Namibia
- Country: Namibia
- Capital: Gobabis

Government
  - Governor: Pijoo Nganate

Area
  - Total: 84,981 km^{2} (32,811 sq mi)

Population (2023)
  - Total: 102,881
  - Density: 1.2106/km^{2} (3.1355/sq mi)
- Time zone: UTC+2 (CAT)
- HDI (2017): 0.600 medium · 10th

Omaheke (the Otjiherero word for sandveld) is one of the fourteen regions of Namibia, the least populous region. Its capital is Gobabis. It lies in eastern Namibia on the border with Botswana and is the western extension of the Kalahari Desert. The self-governed villages of Otjinene, Leonardville, and Witvlei are situated in the region. As of 2020, Omaheke had 48,594 registered voters.

== Geography ==
In the east, Omaheke borders are three districts of Botswana:

- North-West - northern
- Ghanzi - eastern
- Kgalagadi - southern

Domestically, it borders the following regions:

- Hardap - south
- Khomas - west
- Otjozondjupa - north and west

Omaheke is traversed by the northwesterly line of equal latitude and longitude.

A large part of this region is known as the Sandveld. The northeastern part of the region is still very much wilderness. According to the 2012 Namibia Labour Force Survey, unemployment in the Omaheke Region is 34.1%.

Anthropologically, almost the entire Ovambanderu and Gobabis-Juǀwa ethnic groups reside in the region. Furthermore, it is a rich cultural area for Herero, Damara-Nama, Tswana, Afrikaners, and Germans. According to the 2011 census, 43% of the population speaks Otjiherero, 30% speak Nama/Damara, and 8% speak Afrikaans at home.

== Economy and infrastructure ==
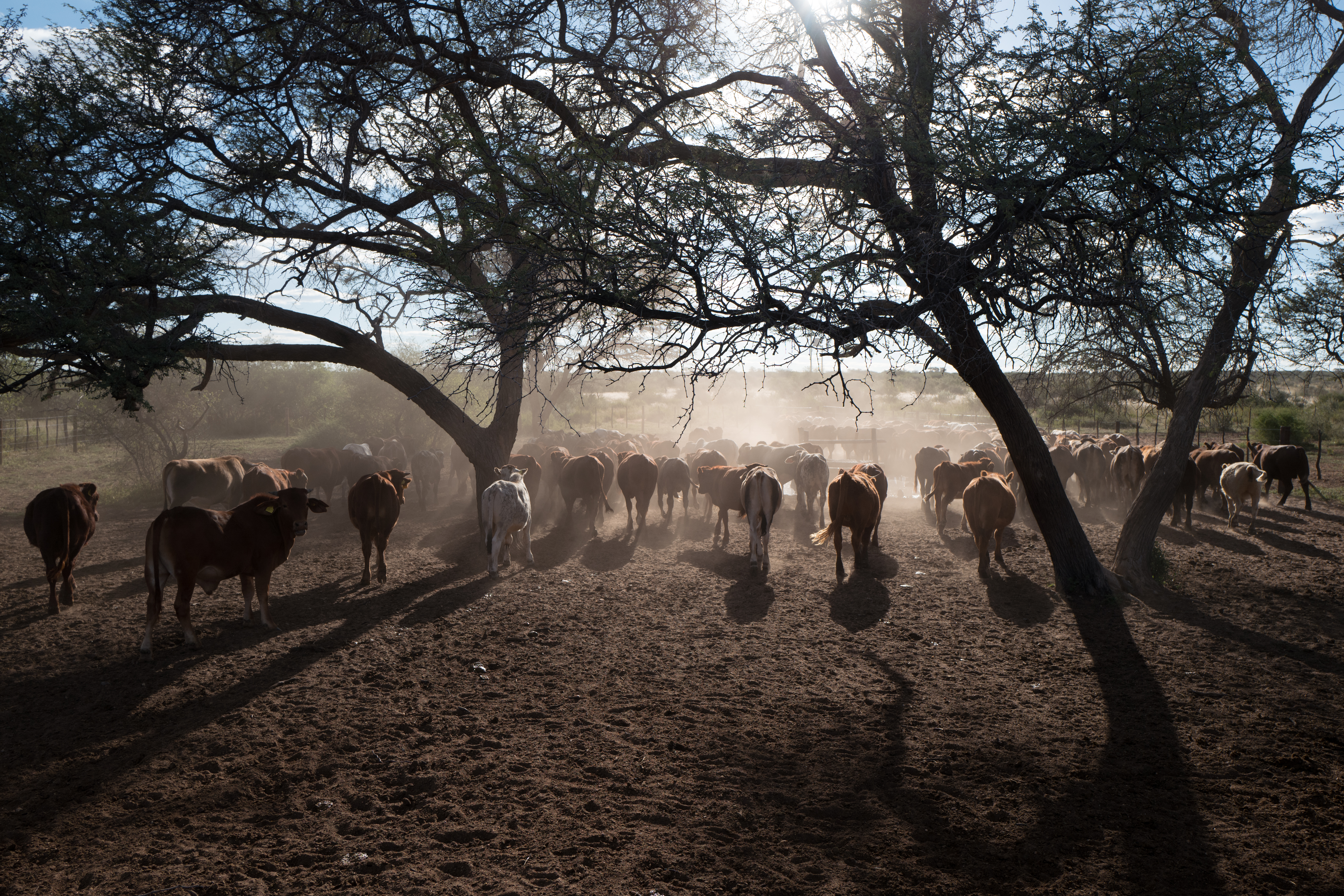
Typical cattle farm near Gobabis

Gobabis is the centre of this area and also its main business area, as it is linked with the capital of Namibia, Windhoek, by rail and the tarred B6 national road. This infrastructure serves as the main supply line for the region.

All the other population centres in the region are linked with Gobabis by road. Many other services are rendered from Gobabis to the region, such as the Police Divisional Headquarters, which is situated in Gobabis. Clinics in the region are served by medical practitioners based in Gobabis, and there are two hospitals and a clinic serving the region.

The agricultural patterns of this region are, to a large extent, homogeneous. Most of the 900 commercial and 3,500 communal farmers in this area are cattle breeders. A regional office of the Ministry of Agriculture, serving the whole region, is based in Gobabis.

Hunting, including trophy hunting, is one of the major sources of income for the region. This takes place mainly in the winter months, from June to August. During these months, tourists from the northern hemisphere can be seen in the area, enjoying the mild and dry winter climate and collecting trophies.

In 2013, Omaheke had 42 government schools with a total of 18,365 pupils.

== Politics ==
Omaheke constituencies (2014)

Upon the independence of Namibia, the eastern part of Hereroland was absorbed into the Omaheke Region. The region comprises seven constituencies:

- Aminuis
- Epukiro
- Gobabis
- Kalahari
- Okorukambe (formerly Steinhausen)
- Otjinene
- Otjombinde

As in all other regions, SWAPO was by far the strongest political party since Namibian independence. However, Omaheke is a region where there has always been considerable support for opposition parties.

=== Presidential elections ===
In the 2004 presidential election, the Omaheke Region supported SWAPO's Hifikepunye Pohamba with 13,005 votes (46%), but the Ohangwena Region native did not win a majority of the votes in the region. National Unity Democratic Organisation (NUDO)'s Kuaima Riruako, paramount chief of the Herero people, received over 7,000 votes (25%), and the Democratic Turnhalle Alliance (DTA)'s Katuutire Kaura received over 3,700 votes (13%). Only in the much more populated Khomas Region and neighboring Otjozondjupa Region did Riruako gain more votes, and in no other region did NUDO's candidate gain a higher percentage of the votes.

=== Regional elections ===
In the 2004 regional election for the National Assembly of Namibia, SWAPO won four of the seven constituencies. Aminuis and Otjinene were won by candidates of NUDO, and in Otjombinde, the South West Africa National Union (SWANU) candidate became a councillor.

In the 2015 regional elections, SWAPO obtained 54% of the total votes (2010: 47%) and won four of the seven constituencies. NUDO obtained 23% of the total votes (2010: 26%) and won Aminuis and Otjinene, while Otjombinde was won by an independent candidate. Although SWAPO's support dropped to 44% of the total votes in the 2020 regional election, it won five of the seven constituencies, while NUDO (23% total) kept its strongholds, Otjinene and Aminuis.

=== Governors ===
- Laura McLeod-Katjirua (SWAPO, 2001–2012)
- Rapama Kamehozu (2012–2013)
- Festus Ueitele (2013–2020)
- Pijoo Nganate (2020–present)

== Demographics ==
As of 2023, there are 102,881 inhabitants of Omaheke, with an annual growth rate of 3.1%. Males outnumber females, with 112 men for every 100 women. The fertility rate is 5.0. The population is roughly split between urban and rural; 43.8% live in urban communities, while 56.2% live in rural communities. On average, there are 1.2 people per km^{2}. The average household size is 3.3 persons. 29.2% of the adult population is married. 20.1% have access to the internet, and 45.6% own a cellphone. The literacy rate is 76%. Roughly a fifth (21.6%) have never attended school. 89.8% of inhabitants have access to clean drinking water, but only 42.1% have access to toilet facilities and only 35.4% have electricity. Approximately half (50.4%) make a living through wages, 13.9% through old-age pensions, 9.3% through farming, and 5.0% through non-farming business.
