= Mbanderu people =

Mbanderu
Regions with significant populations
- Namibia: 12,594 (2023 census)

Languages
- Otjiherero

Religion
- African Traditional Religion, Christianity, Oupwee

Related ethnic groups
- Ovahimba, Ovaherero

The Mbanderu (singular: Omumbanderu, plural: Ovambanderu) are a population inhabiting eastern parts of Namibia and western parts of Botswana. They speak Otjiherero, a Bantu language.

== History and Culture ==
=== Etymology ===
While earlier theories of the meaning of the word mbanderu stated "People of the reed" (mbandu: people and oruu: reed), the explanation common today is that mbanderu literally means 'fighters of old'.

=== Origins ===
Results from investigations about similarities in their music point to East Africa as the origin of all Bantu tribes that today inhabit Namibia. The Ovambo people left this area first and settled in the north of today's Namibia, the Herero people left after that, and the Ovambanderu migrated last. In the 19th century the Ovambanderu had reached Angola and moved from there into Kaokoland and Ovamboland but got into fights with already resident Herero tribes and subsequently settled in the eastern part of South-West Africa. After reaching the area around Okakarara the Ovambanderu spread out to find suitable pasture for their cattle.

Around 1904, after a devastating clash with German colonial forces in Namibia, many of the Mbanderu people settled along the Boteti River around Tsienyane. The area was already settled by other peoples; thus they requested to be allocated their own land where they could practice their own culture without any hindrance.

=== Culture ===
Two important cultural notions among the Herero-Mbanderu speaking groups are ejanda and oruzo. These are generally synonymous with matrilineage and patrilineage, respectively. The recognition of lineal ancestry through both mothers and through fathers is generally known as double descent. "Ejanda" identity is important in determining who one should marry; two people in exactly the same 'ejanda' should not marry each other. In the past, marriage partners may have been determined at the birth of a girl by her parents. In many cases, the groom was much older than the girl."Oruzo" is associated with traditional religious practice and with political leadership. It is symbolized in part by prohibitions about raising and eating particular kinds of animals.

Cattle are central in the economic and spiritual life of Ovambanderu. Not only are cattle a central source of meat, sour milk omaere, and fat (ongondivi), they have also played a symbolic role in the relation of people to their ancestors. In the past, the male head of a residential group conducted rituals at the holy fire ('okuruwo'), for instance, tasting the milk, on behalf of those residing there. Choosing a cow to be used during these rituals was at the discretion of the owner of the cattle. The milk from this cow used could not be drunk by uncircumcised Mbanderu or outsiders.

Using dogs and traps are the traditional methods of hunting. Since the 19th century, horses and guns have also been used.

Mbanderu people are active in annual remembrance ceremonies held in Namibia and Botswana at the graves of important cultural leaders. They are particularly associated with the "Green Flag" (Otjingirine).

== Notable Mbanderu people ==
Notable people of Mbanderu descent are:

- Keharanjo Nguvauva
- Kahimemua Nguvauva
- Munjuku Nguvauva II
- Peter Fredrick Nguvauva
- Kilus Nguvauva
- Karikondua Nguvauva
- Arnold Ripuree Tjozongoro
- Erastus Tjiundikua Kahuure
- Gerson Kunomundu Katjirua
- Kueekuje Uavingururua Kazapua
- Kovitjana Henguva
- Edward Mainjunguruka Ndjoze
