= Hereroland =

Bantustan in South West Africa (1968–1989)

- 1968–1989
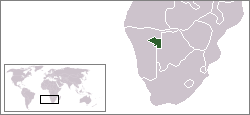
- Location of Bantustan (green) within South West Africa (grey)
- Status: Bantustan (1968–1980); Second-tier authority (1989–1989)
- Capital: Okakarara
- History
  - Established: 1968
  - Re-integrated into Namibia: May 1989
- Currency: South African rand
Preceded by	Succeeded by
South West Africa	Namibia

Herero
- Person: OmuHerero
- People: OvaHerero
- Language: OtjiHerero
- Country: Hereroland

Hereroland was a Bantustan and later a non-geographic ethnic-based second-tier authority, the Representative Authority of the Hereros, in South West Africa (present day Namibia), intended by the apartheid-era government to be a self-governing homeland for the Herero people.

== Geography ==
Hereroland can be found in present-day eastern Namibia and encompassed parts of the Kalahari Desert. The Bantustan was located under Bushmanland and bordered Botswana to the east.Hereroland is a semiarid area that consists of mostly undulating terrain.

== Background ==
=== German colonialism ===
South-West Africa, present day Namibia, became a German protectorate in 1884 by the decree of Otto von Bismarck. In 1904, the Herero, under the leadership of Chief Samuel Maharero, rebelled against the German colonisers. In reaction to this rebellion, Lieutenant General Lothar von Trotha was sent to end the Herero uprising. The German – Herero War, which started in 1904 and lasted until 1907, led to the decimation of the Herero society. It is estimated that the Herero population consisted of roughly 80000 – 100000 Herero people before the German-Herero War, however only roughly 16000 Herero people survived. Between 1904 and 1908, tens of thousands of Herero and Nama people were tortured, starved in the Kalahari desert or shot as retaliation for the Herero rebellion which is known as the Herero genocide. After this war, the surviving Herero people were prohibited from practising their religion, were barred from possessing livestock or land, as well as unable to have chiefs as per their traditional customs. Most of the survivors were made up of children and women and they were either conscripted to forced labour or were imprisoned in camps.

=== South African control ===
South African forces took control of the German colony South-West Africa during World War One (1914–1918). This later led to the creation of Bantustans, such as the Hereroland.

== Administrative history ==
=== Bantustan (1968–1980) ===
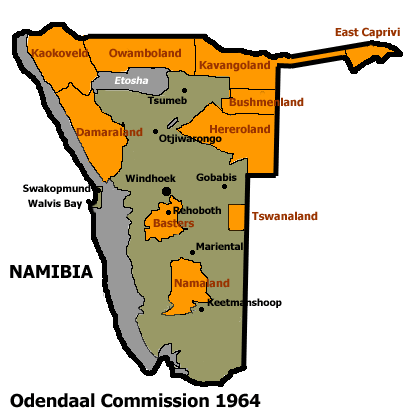
Allocation of land to Bantustans according to the Odendaal Plan. Hereroland is in the north-east.

Hereroland was established as a geographically defined Bantustan under the Odendaal Plan in 1968. Because of internal strife among different Herero groups, no unified institutions were established for the Herero people until 1980. Two districts of Hereroland (West and East) were formed in 1970. The chief of Hereroland West, Clemens Kapuuo, claimed to be the paramount chief of all Hereros since 1970, but this claim was not recognized by the other Herero groups.

=== Representative authority (1980–1989) ===
Following the Turnhalle Constitutional Conference the system of Bantustans was replaced in 1980 by Representative Authorities which functioned on the basis of ethnicity only and were no longer based on geographically defined areas.

The Representative Authority of the Hereros had executive and legislative competencies, being made up of elected Legislative Assemblies which would appoint Executive Committees led by chairmen.

As second-tier authorities, forming an intermediate tier between central and local government, the representative authorities had responsibility for land tenure, agriculture, education up to primary level, teachers' training, health services, and social welfare and pensions and their Legislative Assemblies had the ability to pass legislation known as Ordinances.

== The Turnhalle Constitutional Conference and the Democratic Turnhalle Alliance ==
The Turnhalle Constitutional Conference was called together on 1 September 1975, supported and sponsored by apartheid South Africa. The target of the Conference was to develop a constitution for South-West Africa, while still being under the control of South Africa. This unique moment in Namibia's history was the first time that leaders and chiefs from different ethnic and tribal groups were allowed to come together and have political discussions about the future of Namibia's constitution. Many religious institutions in Namibia were opposed to this because it was organised by Apartheid South Africa. Andre du Pisani, a Namibian political scientist, stated on the involvement of the Herero through the Chief Clemens Kapuuo that:

For most local observers Clemens Kapuuo's decision to participate in the Turnhalle constitutional conference came as a surprise, for here was a man openly opposed to South Africa's policies of ethnic fragmentation in Namibia. Furthermore, he had gone so far as to petition South Africa at the United Nations, and had previously rejected the Prime Minister's Advisory Council (the institutional predecessor of the constitutional conference) on the grounds that South Africa had no right to establish such a body.

—

The South-West African People's Organisation (SWAPO) did not attend this conference due to the lack of autonomy, as well as the United Nations (UN) condemning the creation of the constitution due to the lack of its independence from South Africa. However, while this conference was critiqued by various institutions and political parties, it also was an important step for the constitutional development in Namibia.

Clemens Kapuuo, the chief of the Herero, as well as Dirk Mudge, who was the chairman of the conference and an associate of the white minority rule, formed the Democratic Turnhalle Alliance (DTA) which was promoted by the apartheid regime in South Africa. The new constitution set up a parliamentary regime, a decentralised government that was based on ethnic authorities, as well as a bill of rights. The UN and SWAPO did not recognise the new South-West African constitution which had been supported by Apartheid South Africa.

== South African General Administrator ==
After the Democratic Turnhalle Alliance, South Africa introduced a General Administrator who abolished white representation within the Namibian government, as well as other apartheid laws. In 1985 the last South-West African General Administrator, Louis Pienaar, worked together with Martti Ahtisaari, who worked as a representative of the United Nations, to ensure the transition of the independence for Namibia. They accomplished the transition from South African control to agreements on electoral processes and peacekeeping for Namibia in 1989. This change in policy then led to the abolition of the homelands, such as Hereroland, and to the Namibian independence in 1990.

== Fight for liberation and transition to independence ==
In 1960, as part of a liberation movement, the South-West African People's Organisation (SWAPO) was created and SWAPO's military, known as the People's Liberation Army of Namibia (PLAN), started a guerilla war in 1966 which led to the end of the illegal occupation of South Africa over South-West Africa in 1988.

The United Nations (UN) created the United Nations Resolution Plan 435 which implemented democratic elections and the first president Sam Nujoma and his party, the South-West African People's Organisation, was elected in 1989. The independence of Namibia ended after more than 100 years of colonial rule.

== Leaders of Hereroland ==
=== Hosea Kutako ===
Hosea Kutako was a figurehead of the nationalist resistance against South Africa. Chief Hosea Kuatko was born in 1870 in Okahurimehi and he fought in the German – Herero War (1904 – 1907). He later worked various jobs, amongst them as a teacher and a miner. He was appointed as the headman of the Herero tribe in 1917. He became a founding member of the South-West African National Union (SWANU), as well as being considered one of the early leaders of Namibia. He died at 100 years old in 1970.

=== Clemens Kapuuo ===
Clemens Kapuuo, who was born on 16 March 1923 in Teufelsbach in Okahandja, was a Namibian nationalist and the successor to Chief Hosea Kutako. He went to St Barnabas College and later trained as a teacher. He became one of Hosea Kutako's representatives and secretaries. The new chief and politician fought against colonial rule, however later he became controversial due to his involvement in the Turnhalle Conference in 1975 which was sponsored by apartheid South Africa. On the 27 March 1978 Chief Clemens Kapuuo was assassinated near Windhoek. This was a result of the rivalry between the SWAPO, which was supported by the USSR, and the party known as the Democratic Turnhalle Alliance, of which Kapuuo was president.

=== Kuaima Riruako ===
Kuaima Riruako, who was born in 1935 at Aminius in Omaheke, became an Ovaherero chief in 1978. He also co-founded the political party known as the National Unity Democratic Organisation (NUDO) in 1964. He was forced into exile in 1964, but returned in 1977. Riruako was known for fighting for the restitution and acknowledgment of the Herero genocide from the German government. The chief died at the age of 79 in 2014.

=== Thimoteus Tjamuaha ===
Thimoteus Tjamuaha was the chairman of the executive committee from December 1980 until September 1984 for the Hereroland.

=== Erastus Tjejamba ===
Erastus Tjejamba was born in 1936 and twice became the chairman of the executive committee for the Hereroland: the first time was from September 1984 until August 1987 and the second time was from October 1987 until February 1988.

=== Gottlob Mbaukua ===
Gottlob Hengombe Mbaukua was born in 1935 and was elected as the chairman of the executive committee of the Hereroland from August 1987 until October 1987 and from February 1988 until May 1989. He also worked as a Non-European clerk in 1960.

== Reparations for the Herero and Nama genocide ==
For the last couple of decades, the Herero people have been fighting for reparations for the Herero and Nama genocide which led to the death of roughly 80% of the Ovaherero and the death of over 40% of the Nama people, as well as the loss of their lands. In 2004 the German development minister gave an apology for the Herero genocide. In 2021 the German government agreed to pay 1.1 billion Euros as a ‘gesture of reconciliation’. This was the result of negotiations between the German and Namibian government which started in 2015. The United Nations have criticised both governments because they have not included the Herero and Nama people in the reparation discussions and therefore have violated the rights of the Nama and Herero ethnic groups. Furthermore, the declaration of reconciliation in 2021 has not yet been signed by various Nama and Herero organisations due to the criticism that the reparations will be paid to the Namibian government, rather than directly to the Nama and Herero descendants, as well as their demand to be included in the reparation talks.

== See also ==
- Apartheid
