= Ludwig von Estorff =

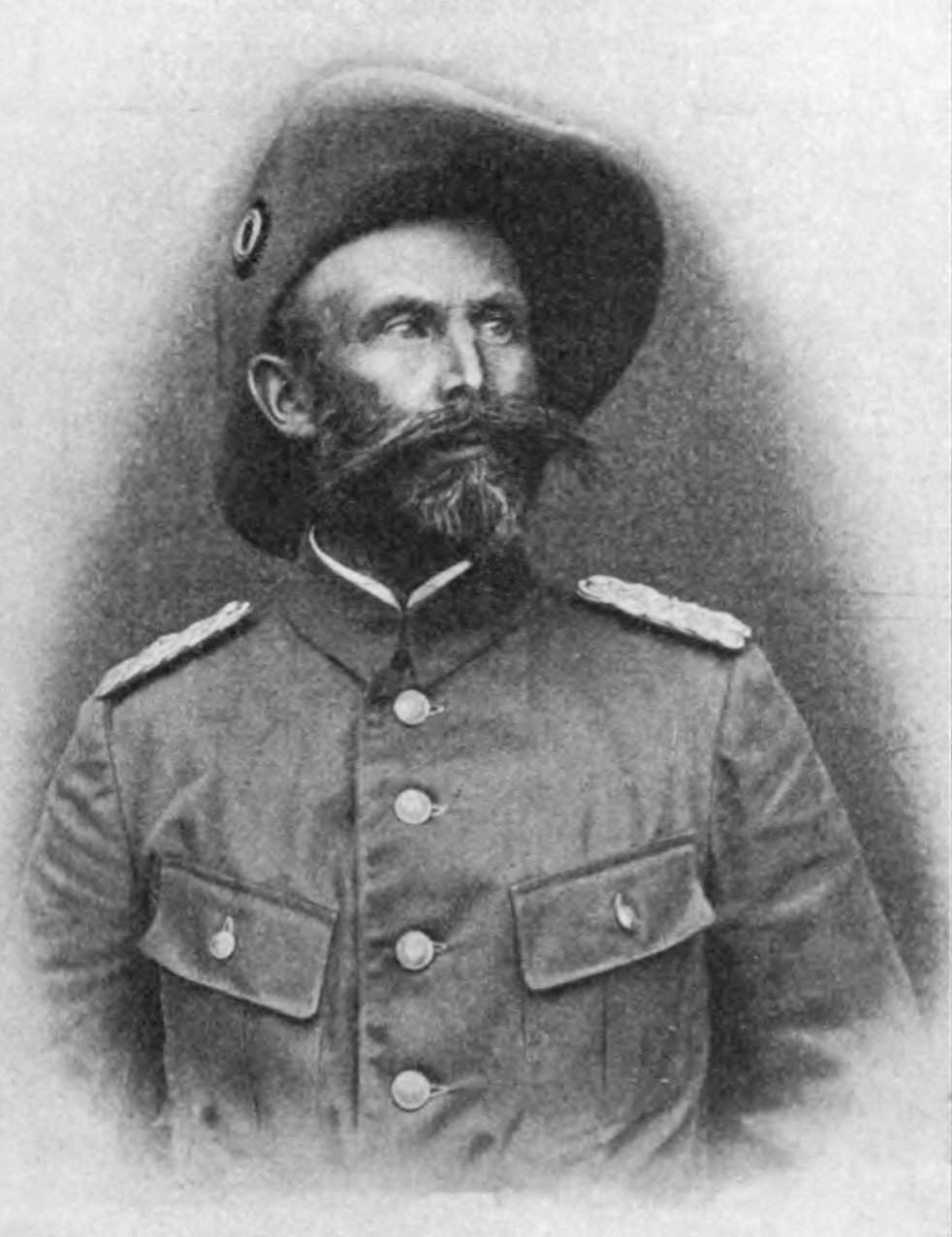
- Ludwig von Estorff, c. 1905
- Born: 25 December 1859; Hanover, Kingdom of Hanover
- Died: 5 October 1943 (aged 83); Uelzen, Nazi Germany
- Military career
- Allegiance: German Empire; Weimar Republic
- Branch: Imperial German Army; Schutztruppe; Reichsheer
- Service years: 1878–1920
- Rank: Generalleutnant; Char. General der Infanterie
- Commands: Schutztruppe of German South West Africa; 103rd Infantry Division; 42nd Infantry Division; Generalkommando z.b.V. 60; Eighth Army; I Corps
- Conflicts: Colonial conflicts: First Witbooi Rebellion; Herero Wars; Battle of Waterberg; World War I: Western Front; Battle of Verdun; Balkans Theatre; Serbian campaign; Eastern Front; Romanian campaign; Battle of Jugla; Operation Albion
- Awards: Pour le Merite

Ludwig Gustav Adolf von Estorff (25 December 1859 – 5 October 1943) was a German military officer who notably served as a Schutztruppe commander in Africa; and later as an Imperial German Army general in World War I. He also was a recipient of the Pour le Merite, Germany's highest military award.

== Early life and career ==
Ludwig was the second child of later Generalmajor Eggert Ludwig von Estorff (1831–1903) and his wife Julie Bernhardine, née von Witzendorff (1836–1902). In 1878, after being a cadet in Berlin, Estorff was commissioned into the Prussian Army as a Lieutenant in the 31st (1st Thuringian) Infantry Regiment. In 1894, by now a Hauptmann, he left the army in order to join the Schutztruppe of German South West Africa. There he'd quickly see service in the First Witbooi Rebellion. After five years he briefly returned to Germany, then resumed service on various stations on the African continent.

== Herero Wars ==
He resigned in 1903 but rejoined the Schutztruppe in the next year to fight in the Herero Wars as battalion and regimental commander. At the Battle of Waterberg he led a column, and afterwards was ordered to pursue the fleeing Hereros through the scarce Omaheke Desert. Estorff was highly critical of commanding General Lothar von Trotha and his decisions, on both strategical and ethical reasons, which deliberately resulted in the Herero and Nama genocide. He nonetheless followed his orders; thus having a part in the same. In early 1907, Estorff was made commander of the Schutztruppe of German South West Africa. He immediately closed the dreaded Shark Island concentration camp, against local political wishes, and relocated the remaining Nama people to the mainland. Estorff would remain on his post until he finally left for Germany in 1911. Estorff's diaries, reports and correspondence about his time in Africa would eventually be collected and published posthumously. Now, as an Oberst in the Imperial German Army, he commanded the 92nd (Brunswick) Infantry Regiment.

== World War I ==
When World War I began, Generalmajor Estorff led a brigade in France and was seriously wounded when a bullet shattered his knee. He returned to duty in 1915 and was made commander of the 103rd Infantry Division, leading it into the Serbian campaign. In 1916 he commanded the 42nd Infantry Division on the Eastern Front, first in Romania and then further north. For his services in the latter campaign Estorff received the Pour le Merite, Germany's highest military award. With his division being part of the famed Eighth Army, he led the landing forces during Operation Albion, the successful amphibious operation to occupy the West Estonian archipelago. In March 1918 he took over command of the 60th Corps. In the final days of the war he was acting commander of the Eighth Army.

== Later life ==
After the war had ended he served as final commander of the prestigious I Corps and military governor of Königsberg throughout 1919. He was retained in the much-reduced Reichswehr and served simultaneously as commander of a brigade, military district and general command. During the Kapp Putsch he announced his support of the new putschist government. When the coup failed and the legitimate Weimar Republic government restored he accordingly was dismissed. He saw no further service but in 1939, in the wave of brevet promotions to commemorate the Battle of Tannenberg, he was given the character of a General der Infanterie.

Estorff died at Uelzen on 5 October 1943.

== Posthumously published writings ==
- Ludwig von Estorff (1968). Kutscher, Christoph-Friedrich (ed.). Geschrieben unter dem Kameldornbaum: Die Briefe und Berichte Ludwig von Estorffs aus dem alten Südwestafrika 1894-1903 (in German). Windhoek: Self-published (1968), Verlag John Meinert (1982). ISBN 9780620063272.
- Ludwig von Estorff (1968). Kutscher, Christoph-Friedrich (ed.). Wanderungen und Kämpfe in Südwestafrika, Ostafrika und Südafrika 1894-1910 (in German). Windhoek: Self-published (1968), Verlag John Meinert (1979). ISBN 9780620039291.

== See also ==
- List of the Pour le Mérite (military class) recipients
