= Leaders of Hereroland =

Political representatives of the 1968–1989 segregated Herero territory

During part of the South African apartheid administration in South West Africa, when Hereroland was a bantustan (a designated area for Herero people settlement), a political representative was appointed by the South African Administration. At first, this position was given to the respective Paramount Chief of the Herero people until in 1980, political representation was decoupled from chieftaincy. The position of the representative of Hereroland was abolished in May 1989 as part of the transition to Namibian independence which was declared in March 1990.

== Political chief representatives of Hereroland ==
Hereroland was declared in 1968, along with other bantustans in South West Africa. Self–governance of Hereroland was granted on 26 July 1970, which lasted until May 1989. The chair of the Executive Committee of Hereroland was occupied by:

- Hosea Kutako (2 October 1968 to July 1970)
- Clemens Kapuuo (July 1970 to 27 March 1978)
- Kuaima Riruako (7 June 1978 to 5 December 1980)
- Thimoteus Tjamuaha (5 December 1980 to September 1984)
- Erastus Tjejamba (August 1987 to October 1987 and October 1987 to February 1988)
- Gottlob Mbaukua (September 1984 to August 1987 and February 1988 to May 1989)

== See also ==
- Bantustans in South West Africa
