= Heroes' Day (Namibia) =

Holiday in Namibia

- Official name: Namibia Day
- Observed by: Namibia
- Date: 26 August
- Next time: 26 August 2027
- Frequency: annual

Heroes' Day (Afrikaans: Helde-dag, German: Heldentag) is a national public holiday in Namibia. It is recognized by the United Nations as Namibia Day. Celebrated annually on 26 August, the day commemorates the Namibian War of Independence which began on 26 August 1966 at Omugulugwombashe.

== Origin ==
In 1966, the United Nations General Assembly revoked South Africa's mandate to govern South West African territory and placed it under direct UN administration. South Africa refused to recognize this resolution. The South West Africa People's Organization (SWAPO) at that time prepared for armed resistance and founded its armed wing, the People's Liberation Army of Namibia (PLAN) in 1962. Many of its former commanders were in exile, but PLAN began to infiltrate the north of Namibia to establish training camps. Omugulugwombashe was one such training camp, established in June 1966 by PLAN commander John Ya Otto Nankudhu. The group under Nankudhu had just started to build defensive structures and planned to train about 90 soldiers there.

On 26 August 1966, eight helicopters of the South African Defence Force attacked the guerrilla fighters at Omugulugwombashe. At the time of the attack, there were only 17 soldiers in the camp. It was the first armed battle of the War.

Namibia has two state cemeteries, the Heroes' Acre outside the capital Windhoek, and the site at Omugulugwombashe in the Tsandi electoral constituency in the Omusati Region of northern Namibia.

In commemoration of the day, 26 August is a public holiday in Namibia. While recognized by the United Nations as Namibia Day, the day is celebrated as Heroes' Day in Namibia. It is normally celebrated in different regions, and in 2026 will be celebrated at the Heroes' Acre outside Windhoek.

== Proceedings ==
National celebrations take place annually at different places, usually in the north of Namibia, near important battle zones. Hundreds of people gather annually to watch leaders officially commemorate veterans of the People's Liberation Army of Namibia (PLAN). Likewise, honours, such as military medals, are handed out on this day. Heroes' Acre, a war memorial outside of Windhoek, was opened on Heroes' Day in 2002. It is also the same day that the United Nations Institute for Namibia, a tertiary educational body in Zambia under the auspices of the United Nations and a forerunner to the University of Namibia, was inaugurated in 1976.

== Herero Day ==
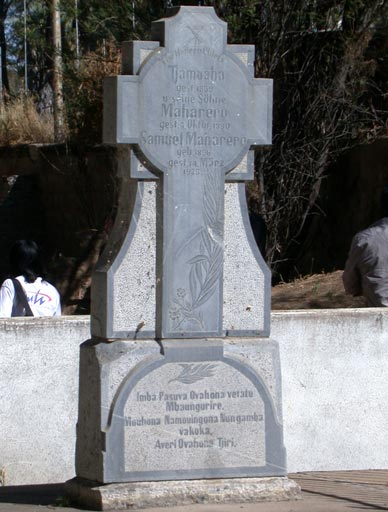
Monument to Herero Chiefs in Okahandja: Gravestone of Tjamuaha, Maharero, and Samuel Maharero

The Battle of Waterberg on 11 August 1904 was the final battle of the Herero Wars. Following the defeat of the Herero force, the surviving Hereros fled under the leadership of Samuel Maharero, who died in exile in the Transvaal. After his death on 14 March 1923, the South African administration of South West Africa granted permission for his reburial at Okahandja, unaware of the role it would play as a commemoration of anti-colonialisation and a symbol of nationalism.

The reburial ceremony on 26 August 1923 was attended by 3,000 Hereros and 100 Whites, including high-ranking government officials. Since then, Herero Day is held annually as a gesture of resistance, unity and loyalty, as well as defiance against colonisation, particularly by the Germans.

== Postage Stamps ==
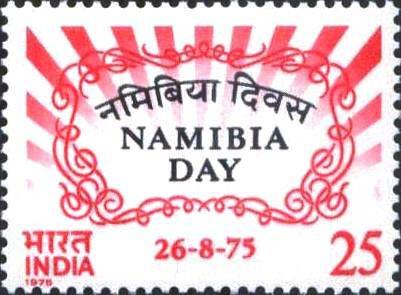
Stamp of India – 1975

On August 26, 1975, India and Turkey issued stamps titled "Namibia Day".
