= Simeon Kambo Shixungileni =

Namibian politician

Simeon Linekela Kambo Shixungileni (1934 at Okandiva village in Edundja – 2014 in Oshakati), was a Namibian guerrilla, army officer and politician. He was the second commander in -charge of the forces of the People's Liberation Army of Namibia (PLAN) at Omugulugwombashe when the armed struggle for independence began there on 26 August 1966 and was later jailed at Robben Island. He is a National Hero of Namibia for his contributions to the independence of the country.

== Battle at Omugulugwombashe ==
In 1966 the UN General Assembly revoked South Africa's mandate to govern South West African territory and placed it under direct UN administration. South Africa refused to recognize this resolution. The group under Nankudhu had just started to build defensive structures and planned to train about 90 soldiers at Omugulugwombashe.

On 26 August 1966, eight helicopters of the South African Defence Force attacked the PLAN guerrilla fighters, only 17 of which were in the camp at the time of attack. It was the first armed battle in the Namibian War of Independence. In commemoration of the day, 26 August is a public holiday in Namibia. It is recognized by the UN as Namibia Day but Namibians refer to it as Heroes' Day.

Shixungileni was arrested, charged and was sentenced to death under the Terrorism Act. Following international pressure the sentence was converted to life in prison at Robben Island.
