= National Convention (Namibia) =

South West African alliance of political parties

The National Convention, also known as the National Convention of Freedom Parties of Namibia (NCFP) was an alliance of political parties in South West Africa. The NC was founded on 13 November 1971, by Clemens Kapuuo, representing NUDO, with other founding members including David Meroro (SWAPO) and Gerson Veii (SWANU). Kapuuo was voted as its first chairman.

== History ==
The National Convention was formed shortly after the International Court of Justice declared South Africa's rule over Namibia illegal by various nationalist groups including the South West Africa People's Organisation (SWAPO), the South West Africa National Union (SWANU), and the National Unity Democratic Organisation (NUDO). The National Convention's aim was to serve as a united front of liberation forces opposing South African occupation. Additional parties such as the Rehoboth Volksparty under Ben Africa Diergaardt, SWAUNIO, the Voice of the People Party, NAPDO, and the Association for the Preservation of the Tjamuaha-Maharero Royal House joined in 1972. The NC continued to grow, attracting support from traditional authorities like the Herero Chiefs' Council, Nama Chiefs’ Council, and the Damara Tribal Executive Committee (DTEC).

The NC refused to participate in the South African Advisory Council for South West Africa, established in March 1973, criticizing its ethnic-based structure. In November 1973, Kapuuo attempted to gain United Nations recognition for the National Convention, but his efforts were unsuccessful despite support from Meroro and Veii. In July 1975, following sustained lobbying from Kapuuo, South African Minister P. W. Botha announced that the Ovaherero community at Aminuis would not be forcibly relocated, effectively scrapping plans to establish a Tswana ethnic "homeland" (Tswanaland) under the Odendaal Plan. This marked a partial dismantling of the Odendaal framework and contributed to Kapuuo's decision to later participate in the Turnhalle Constitutional Conference.

The NC collapse in 1974, due to internal and external pressures. After the NC's disintegration, Kapuuo shifted focus to the South African-led Turnhalle Constitutional Conference, a conference aimed to create a multi-racial government for Namibia. On 5 November 1977, the Democratic Turnhalle Alliance (DTA) was formed and Kapuuo was elected as the DTA's first President.

Kapuuo was assassinated in 1977, just months after the formation of the DTA, cutting short his leadership in the movement for Namibian independence.
