= Herero Day =

Commemoration of the Herero people of Namibia

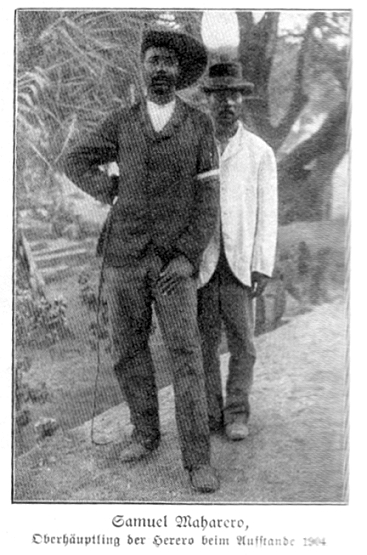
Samuel Maharero, Chief of the Herero, during the Herero and Nama genocide, 1904

Herero Day (also known as Red Flag Day and Red Flag Heroes' Day, Otjiherero: Otjiserandu) is a gathering of the Herero people of Namibia to commemorate their deceased chieftains. It is held in Okahandja in central Namibia annually on August 26, the day and place Herero chief Samuel Maharero's body was reburied alongside his ancestors in 1923. Accordingly, the celebrations last three days long, although they usually begin on the Sunday nearest August 23.

== Background ==
The Battle of Waterberg on 11 August 1904 was the final battle of the Herero Wars in what was then German South West Africa. Following the defeat of the Herero force, the surviving Hereros fled into the Kalahari Desert under the leadership of Samuel Maharero. Of the estimated 4–6,000 Herero warriors, only 1,175 reached their destination of British Bechuanaland, the rest died of thirst, hunger, and diseases.

Samuel Maharero gained British asylum at the Bechuanaland Protectorate and lived in exile at Tsau until 1907, and later in the Transvaal. Only after he died on 14 March 1923, was his body relocated to South West Africa. His remains arrived at Okahandja on 23 August 1923, and on 26 August he was reburied there.

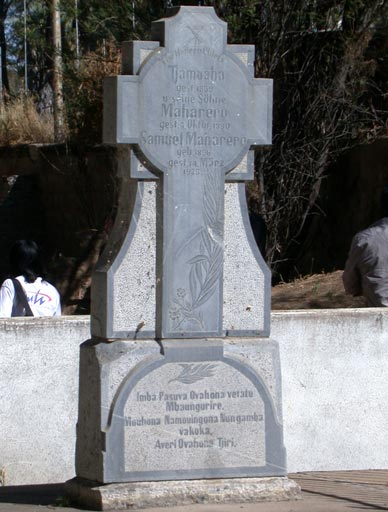
Monument to Herero Chiefs in Okahandja: Gravestone of Tjamuaha, Maharero, and Samuel Maharero

Unaware of the role the reburial would play as a commemoration of anti-colonialisation and a symbol of nationalism, the South African administration granted permission for the reburial. The respective ceremony was attended by 3,000 Hereros and by 100 Whites, including high-ranking government officials. Since then, Herero Day is held annually as a gesture of resistance, unity and loyalty, as well as defiance against colonisation, particularly that by the Germans.

== Proceedings ==
The main event of the 3-day gathering is a procession to several graves of Herero chiefs, followed by a church service. The men wear military-style phantasy uniforms, the women wear the traditional dress of the Herero, a voluminous skirt of many layers with a "horned hat", headgear consisting of two wide points.

== Heroes' Day ==
On August 26, Namibia also celebrates Heroes' Day, a national holiday commemorating the Namibian War of Independence which began on 26 August 1966 at Omugulugwombashe. The Herero Day assembly typically does not take place exactly on August 26 to give high-ranking government officials with Herero descent the opportunity to attend both events.
