= David Meroro =

National Chairman of SWAPO
- In office 1964–1991
- President: Sam Nujoma
- Preceded by: office established
- Succeeded by: office abolished

Personal details
- Born: David Hosea Meroro; 1 January 1917 Waarbakkie (a village near Keetmanshoop), South West Africa
- Died: 18 January 2004 (aged 87) Windhoek, Namibia
- Party: SWAPO

David Hosea Meroro (1 January 1917 – 18 January 2004) was a Namibian politician, liberation struggle veteran, and businessman. He was a founding member of the South West Africa People's Organization (SWAPO) and served as its National Chairman from 1964 to 1991. Meroro played a key role in leading SWAPO's internal resistance against the South African apartheid regime when many of its top leaders were in exile. Following Namibia's independence in 1990, he became a member of the Constituent Assembly, contributing to the drafting of the country's first Constitution. He later served in the National Assembly as a SWAPO member.

On 18 January 2004, Meroro died at Windhoek Central Hospital at the age of 87. He had been hospitalized for three weeks. He was accorded a Heroes' Funeral and buried at Heroes' Acre, Namibia's official burial site for national heroes.

== Early life ==
Meroro was born on 1 January 1917 at Waarbakkie, a village near Keetmanshoop in the Karas Region. He later moved to Windhoek, where he established himself as a businessman in the Old Location. During his time in Windhoek, Meroro was actively involved in community organizations. He was a member of an intelligence unit called “Ozohoze” within the Herero Chiefs' Council, led by Chief Hosea Kutako. He was also a participant in the African Improvement Society, an organization advocating for better educational opportunities for Africans under colonial rule.

== Political career ==
Meroro witnessed the events around the Old Location Uprising in Windhoek on 10 December 1959, a pivotal moment in Namibia’s resistance against apartheid. In 1960, he joined the newly founded South West Africa National Union (SWANU), but as political dynamics shifted, he aligned with the South West Africa People's Organisation (SWAPO) in 1962. In 1964, he was elected National Chairman of SWAPO, a position he held for nearly three decades. This role made him the highest-ranking SWAPO leader inside Namibia, especially when most of the movement's leadership was in exile.

As a known leader of the internal resistance, Meroro faced continuous harassment, arrests, and torture by the South African authorities. His home and business premises were frequently raided, with security forces searching through toothpaste tubes, teapots, and furniture in an effort to find evidence linking him to SWAPO. The only documents they seized were old copies of the African Communist, a banned publication, and letters exchanged with Peter Katjavivi and Peter Nanyemba. He was detained in solitary confinement for five months, accused of supplying information to SWAPO's external wing, which the South African apartheid regime classified as a "terrorist organization".

On 13 November 1971, Meroro and Clemence Kapuuo played a key role in forming the National Convention (NC), also known as the National Convention of Freedom Parties of Namibia (NCFP), which sought to unite various liberation forces. The NC consisted of SWAPO, NUDO, SWANU, Rehoboth Volksparty and the Herero Chiefs' Council. On 9 March 1973, Meroro and Clemence Kapuuo attempted to present a petition to United Nations Secretary-General Kurt Waldheim at Windhoek International Airport. However, both were arrested along with 100 SWAPO supporters and detained by South African authorities. Later that year, Meroro chaired SWAPO's National Conference in Walvis Bay, reinforcing his leadership role. In June 1974, he was arrested once again by the South African administration. Fearing for his life, Meroro fled into exile in 1975, following a collective decision by SWAPO's internal leadership and exiled comrades abroad to join the independence struggle. Upon arrival in Lusaka, Zambia, he immediately participated in Botswana's Independence celebrations, where he met diplomats such as Paul Lusaka, a key advocate for Namibia's independence at the United Nations.

In May 1976, Sam Nujoma brought Meroro to Kaunga, Zambia, where a conflict among dissatisfied PLAN fighters was unfolding. Although Meroro had no direct authority over the situation, he became indirectly involved in the Ya Otto Commission and the Kapelwa Military Tribunal, which investigated and sentenced PLAN members accused of dissent. In July 1976, many of these dissatisfied fighters were interned in a camp near Kabwe, Zambia, and some were allegedly executed on orders from Moses Garoeb and Mishake Muyongo. According to Meroro, Richard Kapelwa Kabajani opposed the executions but was not courageous enough to prevent them.

From 1975 to 1989, Meroro remained a senior SWAPO leader in exile, continuing his role as National Chairman while serving on the SWAPO Central Committee and Political Bureau. He returned to Namibia in 1989 in the wake of the United Nations-supervised elections. He was elected to Namibia's first Constituent Assembly, where he helped draft the Namibian Constitution. Following Namibia's independence in 1990, Meroro became a member of the National Assembly, serving in the country's first government.

== Death and Recognition ==
Meroro died on 18 January 2004 at Windhoek Central Hospital after spending three weeks in critical condition. His health had been weakened by years of imprisonment, torture, and exile during the liberation struggle. In a short statement, President Sam Nujoma paid tribute to the late Meroro, as “a distinguished Namibian citizen and founder member of the SWAPO Party who led the internal resistance against the racist, colonial and apartheid regime”.

He is survived by his wife, Hilja, their twin daughters, and 21 children, as well as numerous grandchildren and great-grandchildren. The Namibian government honored him with a Heroes' Funeral, and he was buried at Heroes' Acre on 24 January 2004.
