= 60th Corps (German Empire) =

World War I formation of the German Army

60th Corps (Generalkommando zbV 60)
- Flag of the Staff of a Generalkommando (1871–1918)
- Active: 3 August 1915-1919
- Disbanded: 1919
- Country: German Empire
- Branch: Army
- Engagements: World War I

Insignia
- Abbreviation: Genkdo zbV 60

The 60th Corps (German: Generalkommando zbV 60) was a corps formation of the German Army in World War I. It was formed on 20 November 1916 by the establishment of Gruppe Mitau and was still in existence at the end of the war.

== Chronicle ==
Gruppe Mitau, named for the city of Mitau, was set up on 3 August 1915. It was established as 60th Corps (z.b.V.) on 20 November 1916. It was still in existence at the end of the war.

With the onset of trench warfare, the German Army recognised that it was no longer possible to maintain the traditional Corps unit, that is, one made up of two divisions. Whereas at some times (and in some places) a Corps of two divisions was sufficient, at other times 5 or 6 divisions were necessary. Therefore, under the Hindenburg regime (from summer 1916), new Corps headquarters were created without organic divisions. These new Corps were designated General Commands for Special Use (German: Generalkommandos zur besonderen Verwendung).

== Commanders ==
The 60th Corps had the following commanders during its existence:

Commander	From	To
Generalleutnant Günther von Pappritz	25 November 1916	16 March 1918
Generalleutnant Ludwig von Estorff	16 March 1918	end of the war

== See also ==
- German Army (German Empire)

== Bibliography ==
- Cron, Hermann (2002). Imperial German Army 1914-18: Organisation, Structure, Orders-of-Battle [first published: 1937]. Helion & Co. ISBN 1-874622-70-1.
