= John Nankudhu =

Namibian guerrilla, army officer, and politician

Koshiwanda
- Born: John ya Otto Nankudhu; 24 June 1933; Oluhapa
- Died: 7 February 2011 (aged 77)
- Occupation(s): soldier and politician

John ya Otto Nankudhu (1933–2011, nom de guerre: Koshiwanda, the surname is sometimes also spelled Nankugu) was a Namibian guerrilla, army officer and politician. He was the commander of the forces of the People's Liberation Army of Namibia (PLAN) at Omugulugwombashe when the armed struggle for independence began there on 26 August 1966 and was later jailed for 17 years at Robben Island. He is a National Hero of Namibia for his contributions to the independence of the country.

== Early life and exile ==
Nankudhu was born on 24 June 1933 at Oluhapa in northern Namibia. He joined the Ovamboland People's Congress, the predecessor of SWAPO, in 1958, shortly after its foundation. He quickly ascended to become its chairman for Oranjemund. In 1960 he went into exile. He received military training in Egypt until 1963 and thereafter joined a military academy in the USSR where he completed training in 1964.

Nankudhu returned to Africa in 1964 and, already in the rank of a commander of the People's Liberation Army of Namibia (PLAN), started a military training camp in Kongwa, Tanzania. In 1966 he moved into Namibia as one of the first six guerrillas to mobilise and train people for armed resistance. Under his leadership a reconnaissance camp near Ongandjera was established in January, and a training camp at Omugulugwombashe in June.

== Battle at Omugulugwombashe ==
In 1966 the UN General Assembly revoked South Africa's mandate to govern South West African territory and placed it under direct UN administration. South Africa refused to recognize this resolution. The group under Nankudhu had just started to build defensive structures and planned to train about 90 soldiers at Omugulugwombashe.

On 26 August 1966, eight helicopters of the South African Defence Force attacked the PLAN guerrilla fighters, only 17 of which were in the camp at the time of attack. It was the first armed battle in the Namibian War of Independence. In commemoration of the day, 26 August is a public holiday in Namibia. It is recognized by the UN as Namibia Day but Namibians refer to it as Heroes' Day.

John ya Otto Nankudhu was only arrested in December. The South Africans detained him in Pretoria, tortured him, and placed him in solitary confinement. He occupied the cell Walter Sisulu was held in before. In 1968 he was sentenced to death under the Terrorism Act. Following international pressure the sentence was converted to life in prison at Robben Island. He was released in December 1985.

== After Namibian independence ==
After independence, Nankudhu served as regional councillor for Windhoek's Wanaheda constituency (now Samora Machel constituency) from 1999 to 2010. He also was the chairman of the Central Region of the Swapo Party and a member of the Ministry of Veterans' Affairs. On 26 August 2007 he received the honorary military rank of colonel.

John ya Otto Nankudhu was married to Jacobina. They had five children. Nankudhu died on 21 June 2011, reportedly a poor man. Shortly after Nandudhu's death, President Hifikepunye Pohamba conferred the status of National Hero upon him and directed that a state burial be held. Nankudhu was buried at Namibia's Heroes' Acre near Windhoek on 2 July 2011. He is also commemorated at Omugulugwombashe, where a statue of six soldiers engaged in planning a military action depicts Nankudhu and his subordinates.
