= Gottlob Mbaukua =

Namibian politician

Gottlob Hengombe Mbaukua (born 1935) was the chairman of the executive committee of Hereroland from August 1987 to October 1987 and from February 1988 to May 1989. In this position he was the highest representative of his bantustan to the South African apartheid administration in South-West Africa. The Executive Committees were abolished in May 1989 as part of the transition to Namibian independence which was declared in March 1990.

Preceded by Erastus Tjejamba	Leader of Hereroland; 1987–1987	Succeeded by Erastus Tjejamba
Preceded by Erastus Tjejamba	Leader of Hereroland; 1988–1989	Succeeded by position abolished in preparation of Namibian independence
