= Hosea Kutako =

Namibian nationalist leader and paramount chief (1870–1970)

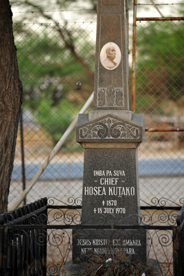
- Grave of Chief Hosea Kutako near Friedenskirche, Okahandja

Paramount chief of the Herero people
- Reign: 1920 – 18 July 1970
- Predecessor: Samuel Maharero
- Successor: Clemens Kapuuo
Names
- Hosea Katjikururume Komombumbi Kutako

Leader of Hereroland
- In office 2 October 1968 – 18 July 1970
- Preceded by: Position established
- Succeeded by: Clemens Kapuuo

Personal details
- Born: 1870 Okahurimehi
- Died: 18 July 1970 (aged 100) Aminuis, South West Africa
- Resting place: near Friedenskirche, Okahandja
- Party: SWANU; National Unity Democratic Organisation

Military service
- Allegiance: Herero
- Battles/wars: Herero Wars (POW)

Hosea Katjikururume Komombumbi Kutako (1870 – 18 July 1970) was a Namibian nationalist leader and traditional ruler who was a founding member of the South West African National Union, Namibia's first nationalist party. He was also paramount chief of the Herero people and chairman of the Herero Chiefs' Council, which he founded in 1945.

Kutako was one of the earliest nationalist leaders in Namibia and has been regarded as the "father of modern Namibian nationalism." He spearheaded the country's modern independence movement by petitioning the United Nations directly and through Rev. Michael Scott. Together with Nikanor Hoveka, he was among the first to petition the UN. Kutako also mentored many future leaders, including Clemens Kapuuo, Fanuel Kozonguizi, and Sam Nujoma, among others. The seat of his chieftaincy was situated at the settlement of Toasis in the Aminuis area.

== Early life ==
Hosea Kutako was born into a royal Herero family in 1870 at Okahurimehi, near present-day Kalkfeld.

He participated in the 1904 German-Ovaherero War. He defeated a German patrol under the command of Lieutenant von Bodenhausen in a skirmish waged between Waterberg and Osondjache on 6 August 1904. Later, he was wounded and held prisoner in Omaruru but managed to escape. After 1907, Kutako was employed as a teacher by the Rhenish Missionary Society but later became a worker in the Tsumeb mine.

== Chieftaincy and political career ==
In 1920, Hosea Kutako was officially appointed paramount chief of the Herero people by Frederik Maharero. Maharero had been empowered to transfer power by his father, Herero chief Samuel Maharero, who had been exiled after the Herero War and was since banned from entering the country by the South African Mandatory Administration. Hosea Kutako took over his role as a commitment to preserve the memory of the Herero before and during the German colonisation as well as of the Battle of Waterberg. The aftermath of this battle was recognised in 2004 by Heidemarie Wieczorek-Zeul, Germany's development aid minister, as being equivalent to genocide.

Also in 1920, he founded the Green Flags, an association to keep up tradition, and went on to found the Red Flags in 1923, after Samuel Maharero's death. Kutako prompted and organised the transfer of Samuel Maharero's body and its funeral on Okahandja next to the grave of Jonker Afrikaner. Kutako also founded the Truppenspieler association. It was intended to attain military importance, but this was opposed by the South African authorities.

On 1 June 1925, Hosea Kutako was elected as the senior leader of all Ovaherero and Chief of the Council of Headmen. He retained this position until his death in 1970. In 1936, conflicts arose between one of the Ovaherero military organisations, the Otjiserandu, and the Advisory Board of the Black township in Windhoek. Kutako was asked by the South West Africa Administration to intervene but had no success. In August 1939, new conflicts arose between the Otjiserandu and Ovaherero leaders. Kutako requested the South West Africa Administration to order Otjiserandu members in Aminuis to leave the reserve. When they refused to comply, police evicted them by force. Otjiserandu members were even seen displaying the German Nazi flag. This led to the banning of the wearing of uniforms and marching at the Okahandja ceremony.

In 1945, Kutako co-founded the Herero Chiefs' Council with the cooperation of chief Frederick Maharero in exile in Botswana, and in 1946, he sent his first petition to the United Nations opposing South Africa's annexation of Namibia.

Kutako became deputy chief of Namibia's Traditional Leaders Council, and also became chief of the Mbanderu people in Botswana in 1951. Along with the British Anglican priest Michael Scott, he submitted numerous petitions to the United Nations during the 1950s and 1960s calling on the world body to end South African rule and grant Namibia independence. This eventually led to the UN's recognition of Namibia as a sovereign country under colonial administration by South Africa and the historic 1971 advisory opinion of the International Court of Justice that South Africa's continued administration of Namibia was illegal in terms of international law. Hosea Kutako is considered a national hero in Namibia.

On 27 September 1959, Kutako co-founded the South West African National Union (SWANU), the first nationalist political party in Namibia. Though aligned with the Herero Chiefs' Council, SWANU became increasingly divided along ethnic and ideological lines, with the Ovamboland People's Organization (OPO), under the leadership of Sam Nujoma, later breaking away and being reconstituted as the South West Africa People's Organisation (SWAPO) in 1960. Kutako played a key role in guiding young nationalist leaders, including Nujoma, and helped organize early exile movements to train freedom fighters. Despite his old age, he continued advocating for unity among Namibia's independence movements.

Kutako opposed the Odendaal Plan of 1964, which sought to divide Namibia into ethnic "homelands" under South African rule. In 1964, he co-founded the National Unity Democratic Organisation (NUDO), advocating for federalism, but it failed to gain traction compared to SWAPO and SWANU.

In 1970, as he neared 100 years old, disputes arose over his successor. The Herero Chiefs' Council appointed Clemens Kapuuo as the automatic successor to Hosea Kutako, as they feared that the South African authorities would try to take advantage of the death of Kutako to impose their own nominee as chief.

== Death and recognition ==
He died on 18 July 1970 in the Aminuis Reserve, in the remote eastern part of the Omaheke Region of Namibia.

Hosea Kutako is one of nine national heroes of Namibia that were identified at the inauguration of the country's Heroes' Acre near Windhoek. Founding president Sam Nujoma remarked in his inauguration speech on 26 August 2002 that:

Chief Hosea Komombumbi Kutako [...] participated on the anti colonial wars of 1904 as one of the leading commanders. He also played an historic and significant role in petitioning the United Nations Organisation demanding the placement of the then South West Africa under the United Nations trusteeship system. [...] In this way, he played a major role in Namibia's struggle for freedom and independence. To his revolutionary spirit and his visionary memory we humbly offer our honor and respect.

Kutako is honoured in form of a granite tombstone with his name engraved and his portrait plastered onto the slab.

Windhoek's international airport, the country's primary international airport, is named after him.

In July 2010, Kutako's former home in the Omaheke Region was nominated by the Omaheke Regional Council to become a national heritage site.

Preceded by Samuel Maharero	Paramount Chief of the Herero people 1917-1970	Succeeded by Clemens Kapuuo
Preceded by none	Leader of Hereroland; 1968-1970	Succeeded by Clemens Kapuuo
