= Gaus Shikomba =

Gaus Shikomba (27 January 1935 - 3 November 2007) was a South West Africa Liberation Army (Swala) intelligence officer who was imprisoned on Robben Island from 1966 to 1984.

== Military career and imprisonment ==
Shikomba was born in 1935 at Onashiku shaLaban near Oshakati in Oshana Region. He joined the Ovamboland People's Organization (OPO) in 1959 and SWAPO in 1960. Shikomba got into politics after meeting Ya Toivo at Ondangwa. He become a political mobilizer in his locality along with Fidelis Laban and Leo Shoopala.

He participated in the Battle of Omugulugwombashe on 26 August 1966, during which he was shot and captured and taken prisoner. He was initially taken to Pretoria but was sent to back to Namibia for a trial in which he was found guilty by Windhoek Supreme Court in August 1969 of conspiring to overthrow the South West African administration with a SWAPO-led one. He was sentenced to life imprisonment on Robben Island, albeit he was released on 11 May 1984.

== Release and acclaim ==
Upon release, Shikomba worked for the Council of Churches in Namibia (CCN) until 1990. He married Wilhelmine Shikomba, who was the first ELCIN woman pastor in Namibia.

On April 21 1995, Shikomba was a recipient of an award from Nelson Mandela, a former fellow prisoner of Robben Island who recognized Shikomba for his selfless struggle to bring about democracy. On Heroes Day, August 26 1995 he was awarded the Omugulugwombashe Medal for bravery by the then President Sam Nujoma in Windhoek. On 26 August 2007 he was honored during Heroes' Day at Eenhana for his participation in the liberation and was made an Honorary Colonel.

Shikomba died in November that year of a heart attack while on the way to a relative's funeral at Omege. Shikomba's funeral was held at the Catholic Church in Emono, and was attended by the Housing and Rural Development John Pandeni, Deputy Minister of Labour Petrus Iilonga, CoD leader Ben Ulenga, Minister of Works Transport and Communication Joel Kaapanda and numerous regional and local councillors and church leaders.
