= Erastus Tjejamba =

Namibian politician

Erastus Tjejamba (born 1936) was the Chairman of the Executive Committee of Hereroland from September 1984 to August 1987 and from October 1987 to February 1988. In this position he was the highest representative of his bantustan to the South African apartheid administration in South-West Africa.

Preceded by Thimoteus Tjamuaha	Leader of Hereroland; 1984–1987	Succeeded by Gottlob Mbaukua
Preceded by Gottlob Mbaukua	Leader of Hereroland; 1987–1988	Succeeded by Gottlob Mbaukua
