= Kuaima Riruako =

Namibian politician, paramount chief of the Herero people

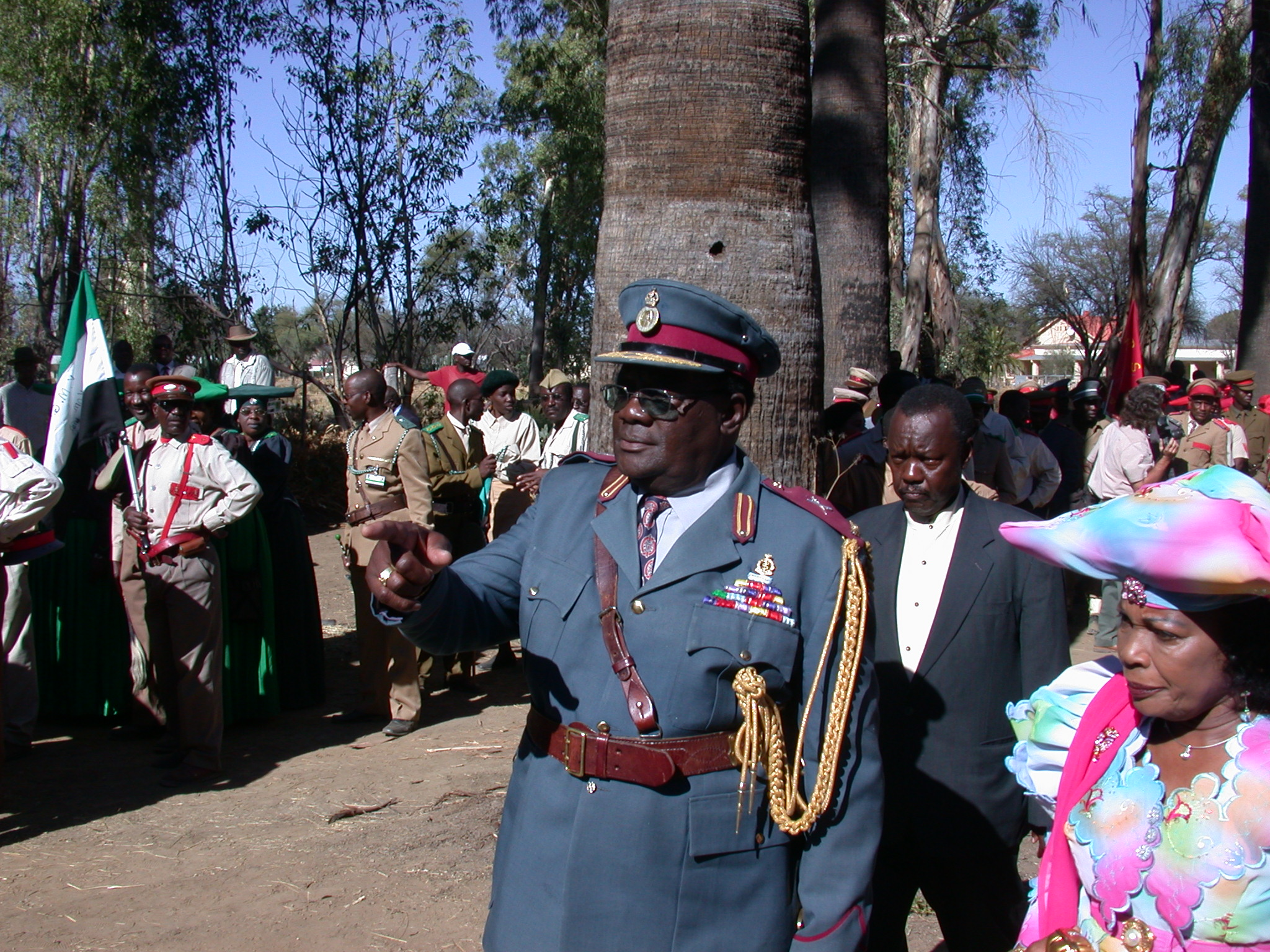
- Kuaima Riruako on Herero Day 2006

Paramount chief of the Herero people
- Reign: 27 March 1978 – 2 June 2014
- Predecessor: Clemens Kapuuo
- Successor: Vekuii Rukoro

Leader of Hereroland
- In office 27 March 1978 – 5 December 1980
- Preceded by: Clemens Kapuuo
- Succeeded by: Thimoteus Tjamuaha

Member of the National Assembly of Namibia
- In office 10 March 2005 – 2 June 2014
- In office 1994 – September 2003

Personal details
- Born: Issaskar Kakuremdiro; 24 April 1935 Otjewe, South West Africa
- Died: 2 June 2014 (aged 79) Windhoek, Namibia
- Party: National Unity Democratic Organisation
- Other political affiliations: Democratic Turnhalle Alliance (until 2003)
- Education: New York University

Kuaima Isaac Riruako (born Issaskar Kakuremdiro; 24 April 1935 – 2 June 2014) was a Namibian politician and the paramount chief of the Herero people. He served as a National Unity Democratic Organisation (NUDO) representative in Parliament, and was the President of NUDO and its presidential candidate in the 2004 presidential election, placing fourth with 4.23% of the national vote.

== Life and career ==
Riruako was born into the Tjamuaha-Maharero royal family on 24 April 1935 in the settlement of Otjewe in the Aminuis Constituency. His birth name was Issaskar Kakuremdiro; the name Kuaima he assumed later in life after his grandfather. He attended school at St. Barnabas Primary in Windhoek and at the end of the 1960s went on to study at the Kwame Nkumah School of Ideology in Accra, Ghana. He also obtained an Associate BA from the New York University. Stemming from his traditional upbringing in rural South West Africa, Riruako had vast knowledge of indigenous culture, folklore, history, and family lineages.

According to family folklore, Riruako had several revelations during his life. He is said to have foretold the assassination of Hendrik Verwoerd in 1966, and a further revelation allegedly saved his life when he was left for dead on the uninhabited Zambian Mombova Island. After 14 days without food and water, it is said that he was told to stand upright on the tiny island, an action that alerted local fishermen that came to investigate where the second "tree" on that island suddenly came from.

After the assassination of Clemens Kapuuo in 1978, Riruako became paramount chief of the Herero. He remained in that position until his death. As Okahandja Herero, Riruako led an effort to receive compensation from the Government of Germany for the Herero massacre between 1904 and 1907 in the same manner that Jews have received compensation for their Holocaust. Germany ruled this out, but he won a formal apology from the German government.

Riruako was a member of the Constitutional Council from 1986 to 1987 and was first elected to the National Assembly of Namibia as a candidate of the Democratic Turnhalle Alliance (DTA) in 1994. In September 2003, NUDO withdrew from the DTA, with Riruako accusing the DTA of failing to work for Herero interests; Riruako became President of NUDO as an independent party on 18 September 2003, and he resigned from the National Assembly in the same month. He was subsequently elected as a NUDO candidate in the November 2004 parliamentary election and served for a second period in the National Assembly beginning on 20 March 2005. In October 2009, NUDO again chose Riruako as their candidate for the 2009 presidential election.

In November 2008, Riruako's home in Aminuis burnt to the ground, killing two of his grandchildren. An elderly woman was saved from the burning home by community members. Riruako was not home at the time of the fire. After this incident the community decided to help their Chief by donating money and other types of donations to him.

After more than a month in ICU for high blood pressure, Riruako died on 2 June 2014 in Windhoek.

Preceded by Clemens Kapuuo	Leader of Hereroland; 1978-1980	Succeeded by Thimoteus Tjamuaha
Preceded by Clemens Kapuuo	Paramount Chief of the Herero people 1978-2014	Succeeded by Vekuii Rukoro
