= Clemens Kapuuo =

Namibian politician and traditional ruler (1923–1978)

Paramount chief of the Herero people
- Reign: 18 July 1970 – 27 March 1978
- Predecessor: Hosea Kutako
- Successor: Kuaima Riruako

Leader of Hereroland
- In office 18 July 1970 – 27 March 1978
- Preceded by: Hosea Kutako
- Succeeded by: Kuaima Riruako

Personal details
- Born: Clemens Mutuurunge Kapuuo; 16 March 1923 Okahandja, South West Africa
- Died: 27 March 1978 (aged 55) Katutura, South West Africa
- Party: SWANU; NUDO; DTA; National Convention

Clemens Kapuuo (16 March 1923 – 27 March 1978) was a Namibian politician and traditional ruler who was paramount chief of the Herero people and leader of Hereroland, a bantustan, from 1970 until his 1978 assassination. He was the first president of the Democratic Turnhalle Alliance (DTA; now the Popular Democratic Movement) and a leading opponent of South African apartheid rule of his country.

Kapuuo was related to Samuel Maharero and was also the blood nephew of Namibian nationalist leader Hosea Kutako.

== Early life ==
Clemens Kapuuo was born on 16 March 1923 at Teufelsbach, a farm near Okahandja. He attended St. Barnabas Anglican Church School in Windhoek's Old Location. He qualified as a teacher at Viljoensdrif and at the Stoffberg Training College, both in the Orange Free State.

From 1944 to 1945 he taught at primary schools in Waterberg and Karibib, and in 1946 transferred to St. Barnabas where he taught English. In 1946, he became one of the founding members of the African Improvement Society (AIS), which acted as a secretariat for the Herero Chiefs' Council. The AIS played a significant cultural and educational role and later rivaled the government-backed Bantu Welfare Club in Windhoek. He was President of the South West Africa Coloured Teachers' Association (SWACTA) from 1950 to 1953. During this period, he also became a member of the Herero Chiefs' Council and played a key role in drafting petitions to the United Nations, advocating for Namibia's independence.

== Political career ==
In 1959, Clemens Kapuuo was a founding member of the South West African National Union (SWANU), Namibia's first nationalist political party, formed as an umbrella body for anti-colonial resistance groups including the Ovamboland People's Organization (OPO), SWAPA, the DEC and the Herero Chiefs' Council among others. On 27 September 1959, SWANU was officially launched at a public meeting in Windhoek with the backing of the Herero Chiefs' Council under Hosea Kutako, and OPO under Sam Nujoma and Jacob Kuhangua. Jariretundu Kozonguizi was elected president, and the executive office included representatives from OPO, SWAPA, the Herero Chiefs' Council, and DEC representing the Damara community under Fritz Gariseb. That same year, Kapuuo led the opposition to the forced relocation of black Namibians from the Old Location to Katutura and witnessed the Old Location Uprising.

Kapuuo resigned as a teacher in 1960 when he was appointed deputy chief to Hosea Kutako. The Herero Chiefs' Council also appointed him as the automatic successor to Hosea Kutako, who was then old, as they feared that the South African authorities would try to take advantage of the death of Kutako to impose their own nominee as chief. That same year, he helped Sam Nujoma go into exile, facilitating his escape from South African authorities. In 1964, the Herero Chiefs' Council withdrew from SWANU and helped form the National Unity Democratic Organisation (NUDO), so that the council as such would not have to be directly involved in politics. The founding leader was Mburumba Kerina, but after disagreements with the Chiefs' Council, Kerina was replaced by Kapuuo.

Following the decision of the International Court of Justice at the Hague in 1971 that South African rule in Namibia was illegal, Kapuuo, as the leader of NUDO was instrumental in forming the National Convention. The National Convention included SWAPO under David Meroro, SWANU under Gerson Veii and several other political groups, and demanded an immediate take-over of Namibia by the United Nations in preparation for independence. In 1973, however, the United Nations declared SWAPO the sole authentic representative of the people of Namibia, and this soured relations between NUDO and SWAPO. Kapuuo objected on the grounds that the Ovambo, who made up the majority of members of SWAPO, had not been dispossessed of their land under German and South African rule as the Hereros had, and were therefore relatively privileged newcomers to the country's independence movement.

Kapuuo officially succeeded Hosea Kutako as paramount chief of the Herero people on 20 July 1970. However, his leadership was contested by Jephta Maharero, who led the Association for the Preservation of the Tjamuaha-Maharero Royal House. After the National Convention collapsed in 1974, Kapuuo participated in the South African-led Turnhalle Constitutional Conference held in Windhoek from 1975 to 1977, which aimed to establish a multi-racial government for Namibia. On 5 November 1977, the Democratic Turnhalle Alliance (DTA) was formed as a counterbalance and main opposition to the SWAPO. Kapuuo was voted as DTA's first President and Dirk Mudge its Chairman. The DTA comprised several ethnically-based parties, including the Republican Party, and Kapuuo's NUDO among others.

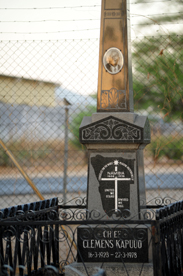
Grave of the chief Clemens Kapuuo in Okahandja, Namibia

== Death ==
Kapuuo was assassinated by two gunmen in the black township of Katutura on 27 March 1978, with both SWAPO and the South African authorities blaming each other of involvement. His killing led to violent clashes between Herero and Ovambo communities in Katutura and Okakarara. SWAPO activist Axel Johannes was detained, tortured, and falsely accused, despite evidence that he was not in Windhoek at the time.

Kapuuo's assassination derailed the United Nations peace process and provided justification for South Africa's military crackdown on SWAPO. The incident also contributed to the downfall of South African Prime Minister John Vorster and the rise of P.W. Botha's militarized government. At his death, Kapuuo was described by the media as a "popular moderate and leader of the multiracial Democratic Turnhalle Alliance".

Kapuuo is buried alongside Hosea Kutako in the traditionally Herero town of Okahandja. Over 10,000 members of the Herero tribe attended his burial, despite fears that the cemetery was mined. In 1999, Herero paramount chief Kuaima Riruako urged the Truth and Reconciliation Commission of South Africa to investigate the assassination of Kapuuo as they had done with killed SWAPO activist Anton Lubowski.

Preceded by Hosea Kutako	Paramount Chief of the Herero people 1970-1978	Succeeded by Kuaima Riruako
Preceded by Hosea Kutako	Leader of Hereroland; 1970-1978	Succeeded by Kuaima Riruako
