= Omugulugwombashe =

Settlement in Tsandi Constituency, Omusati Region, Namibia

Coordinates: 17°46′04″S 14°42′11″E

Omugulugwombashe (also: Ongulumbashe, official: Omugulu gwOombashe; Otjiherero: giraffe leg) is a settlement in the Tsandi electoral constituency in the Omusati Region of northern Namibia. The settlement features a clinic and a primary school. In 1966, the first battle of the South African Border War was fought in Omugulugwombashe. The government of Namibia erected a monument on the 30th anniversary of the battle in 1996.

Omugulugwombashe is located 22km west of Tsandi, on the D3633 gravel road.

== Battle of Omugulugwombashe ==
In 1966 the United Nations General Assembly revoked South Africa's mandate to govern South West Africa (now Namibia) and placed it under direct UN administration. South Africa refused to recognize this resolution. South West African People's Organization (SWAPO) at that time prepared for armed resistance and founded its armed wing, the South West African Liberation Army (SWALA) in 1962. Many of its erstwhile commanders were in exile but SWALA began to infiltrate the north of Namibia to establish training camps. Omugulugwombashe was one such training camp, established in June 1966 by SWALA commander John Ya Otto Nankudhu. The group under Nankudhu had just started to build defensive structures and planned to train about 90 insurgents there.

The area in which the battle took place is forested, on the western fringes of the Cuvelai Basin. On 26 August 1966, eight helicopters landed troops of the South African Defence Force and South African Police to attack the guerrilla fighters at Omugulugwombashe. At the time of attack there were only 17 insurgents in the camp. It was the first armed engagement of the South African Border War, also known as the Namibian War of Independence. Among those SWALA fighters captured and imprisoned were:

- Julius Shaambeni Shilongo Mnyika, served 17 years of a life sentence before being released in 1985
- John ya Otto Nankudhu, served 17 years of a life sentence on Robben Island before being released in 1985
- Immanuel Shifidi, served 18 years of a life sentence on Robben Island
- Gaus Shikomba, sentenced to life imprisonment on Robben Island in August 1969 and released on 11 May 1984.

Other guerrillas escaped but were detained in later years for their participation in the setup of the camp, for instance Lameck 'Kagwaanduka' Ithete who was arrested only in 1969. He served three years jail time in Pretoria for his involvement.

After the battle, PLAN blamed spies in the region for betraying them. Sam Nujoma held a council in which he reportedly stated that "We made mistakes. We won't do that again".

== Commemorations ==
In commemoration of this day, August 26 is a public holiday in Namibia. It is recognized by the United Nations as Namibia Day but Namibians refer to it as Heroes' Day.

Omugulugwombashe today features one of Namibia's two state cemeteries, where national heroes are buried. The other state cemetery is the Heroes' Acre outside the capital Windhoek. Omugulugwombashe contains a memorial shrine, inaugurated by Namibia's founding president Sam Nujoma on 26 August 2013, and a statue of the six soldiers leading the camp when the attacks started on August 26, inaugurated by Namibia's second president Hifikepunye Pohamba on 21 May 2014. The six soldiers depicted in the statue are:

- John Nankudhu, Commander
- Simeon Shixungileni, Deputy Commander
- Patrick Lunganda Iyambo
- Victor Mensah
- James Hamukwaya
- Nelson Kavela

All six of the soldiers in the statue are interred at Omugulugwombashe. Additionally, the site contains the graves of:

- Josef Hipangerwa
- Josef Uushona

=== Omugulugwombashe Medal ===
Although the action, in itself, was of little military significance, it represents the first engagement in what would be a long, intense and ultimately successful conflict. As such, it retains a totemic value that continues to endure and is commemorated in the prestigious decoration for veterans of the Liberation War, the Omugulugwombashe Medal.

=== Omugulugwombashe Star ===
A further commemoration of the battle is the name given to the country's premier rail-service. Namibia's first luxury passenger train, from Windhoek to Ondangwa, was named the Omugulugwombashe Star on its inauguration, on July 15, 2006. This train, manufactured in China, was however grounded after a few rounds of service, because the locomotives packed up shortly after inception and were found unsuitable for Namibia's railway network. Afterwards, the weekly train service to Ondangwa was stopped.

== See also ==
- South African Border War
- SWAPO
