= Thimoteus Tjamuaha =

Namibian politician

Thimoteus Tjamuaha was the Chairman of the Executive Committee of Hereroland from 1980–1984, a bantustan under the control of Apartheid South Africa. In this position he was the highest representative of his homeland to the South African administration in South-West Africa (renamed as Namibia since 1968).

Preceded by Kuaima Riruako	Leader of Hereroland; 1980-1984	Succeeded by Erastus Tjejamba
