= 103rd Infantry Division (German Empire) =

103rd Infantry Division (103. Infanterie-Division)
- Active: 1915–19
- Country: German Empire
- Branch: Army
- Type: Infantry
- Size: Approx. 12,500
- Engagements: World War I: Gorlice–Tarnów Offensive; Serbian Campaign; Macedonian front; Battle of Verdun; Battle of the Somme; Second Battle of the Aisne; German spring offensive; First Battle of the Somme (1918); Third Battle of the Aisne; Second Battle of the Marne; Meuse-Argonne Offensive

The 103rd Infantry Division (103. Infanterie-Division) was a unit of the Imperial German Army in World War I. The division was formed on May 3, 1915, and organized over the next few weeks. It was part of a wave of new infantry divisions formed in the spring of 1915. The division was disbanded in 1919 during the demobilization of the German Army after World War I.

The division was formed primarily from the excess infantry regiments of existing divisions which were being triangularized. The division's 205th Infantry Brigade was formerly the 44th Infantry Brigade of the 22nd Infantry Division, and came to the division with the 32nd Infantry Regiment. The 71st Infantry Regiment came from the 38th Infantry Division and the 116th Reserve Infantry Regiment came from the 25th Reserve Division. The 32nd and 71st Infantry Regiments were Thuringian units, raised in the Duchy of Saxe-Meiningen, the Principality of Schwarzburg-Sondershausen, and Prussian Thuringia (part of the Prussian Province of Saxony). The 116th Reserve Infantry Regiment was from the Grand Duchy of Hesse.

== Combat chronicle ==
The 103rd Infantry Division initially served on the Eastern Front, seeing its first action in the Gorlice-Tarnów Offensive. It was then transferred south to participate in the Serbian Campaign. It advanced to the Greek border and remained on the Macedonian front until April 1916. The division was then sent to the Western Front, entering the line in the Champagne region. From June to July 1916, it fought in the Battle of Verdun. In October and November, it fought in the Battle of the Somme, after which it returned to the trenchlines in the Champagne region and by Verdun. In May 1917, the division fought in the Second Battle of the Aisne, also called the Third Battle of Champagne (and by the Germans, the Double Battle on the Aisne and in the Champagne). Afterwards, it was in the trenchlines in the Chemin des Dames region and later near St. Quentin and on the Oise River. In April 1918, the division participated in the German spring offensive, fighting in the First Battle of the Somme (1918), also known as the Battle of St. Quentin or the Second Battle of the Somme (to distinguish it from the 1916 battle), and in the Third Battle of the Aisne. It later fought in the Second Battle of the Marne and the Meuse-Argonne Offensive. The division remained in the line until the end of the war. Allied intelligence rated the division as a good division in 1917 but as third class in 1918.

== Order of battle on formation ==
The 103rd Infantry Division was formed as a triangular division. The order of battle of the division on May 15, 1915, was as follows:

- 205. Infanterie-Brigade
  - 2. Thüringisches Infanterie-Regiment Nr. 32
  - 3. Thüringisches Infanterie-Regiment Nr. 71
  - Großherzoglich Hessisches Reserve-Infanterie-Regiment Nr. 116
  - Reserve-Jäger-Bataillon Nr. 22
- 2.Eskadron/Grenadier-zu-Pferd-Regiment Freiherr von Derfflinger (Neumärkisches) Nr. 3
- 4.Eskadron/Grenadier-zu-Pferd-Regiment Freiherr von Derfflinger (Neumärkisches) Nr. 3
- Feldartillerie-Regiment Nr. 205
- Fußartillerie-Batterie Nr. 103
- Pionier-Kompanie Nr. 205

== Late-war order of battle ==
The division underwent relatively few organizational changes over the course of the war. Cavalry was reduced, artillery and signals commands were formed, and combat engineer support was expanded to a full pioneer battalion. The order of battle on April 19, 1918, was as follows:

- 205.Infanterie-Brigade
  - 2. Thüringisches Infanterie-Regiment Nr. 32
  - 3. Thüringisches Infanterie-Regiment Nr. 71
  - Großherzoglich Hessisches Reserve-Infanterie-Regiment Nr. 116
- 5.Eskadron/Magdeburgisches Dragoner-Regiment Nr. 6
- Artillerie-Kommandeur 103
  - Feldartillerie-Regiment Nr. 205
  - III.Bataillon/Reserve-Fußartillerie-Regiment Nr. 11
- Pionier-Bataillon Nr. 103
  - 9.Kompanie/2. Brandenburgisches Pionier-Bataillon Nr. 28
  - Reserve-Pionier-Kompanie Nr. 87
  - Minenwerfer-Kompanie Nr. 103
- Divisions-Nachrichten-Kommandeur 103
