= Lothar von Trotha =

German general (1848–1920)

- Trotha in 1904
- Born: 3 July 1848; Magdeburg, Province of Saxony, Prussia
- Died: 31 March 1920 (aged 71); Bonn, Germany
- Spouse(s): Bertha Neumann; Lucy Goldstein-Brinckmann
- Military career
- Allegiance: Kingdom of Prussia (1865–1871); German Empire (1871–1906)
- Branch: Prussian Army; Imperial German Army
- Service years: 1865–1906
- Rank: General der Infanterie (Charakter)
- Known for: Herero and Nama genocide
- Conflicts: Austro-Prussian War; Franco-Prussian War; Wahehe Rebellion; Boxer Rebellion; Herero Wars
- Awards: Pour le Mérite

Adrian Dietrich Lothar von Trotha (3 July 1848 – 31 March 1920) was a German military commander during the European new colonial era. As a brigade commander of the East Asian Expedition Corps, he was involved in suppressing the Boxer Rebellion in Qing China, commanding troops which made up the German contribution to the Eight-Nation Alliance. He later served as governor of German South West Africa and Commander in Chief of its colonial forces, in which role he suppressed a native rebellion during the Herero Wars. He was widely condemned for his brutality in the Herero Wars, particularly for his role in the genocide of the Nama Khoekhoe and the Herero.

== Family ==
Lothar von Trotha belonged to a prominent Saxon noble family. He was married twice; on 15 October 1872 he married Bertha Neumann, who died in 1905.

On 19 May 1912, following his retirement from the service, he married Lucy Goldstein-Brinckmann (1881–1958), a second marriage for both. Lucy came from a Frankfurt Jewish family which had converted to Christianity. Trotha had two sons, who died without known descendants.

== Career ==
Born in Magdeburg, the capital of the Province of Saxony, Trotha joined the Prussian Army in 1865 and fought in the Austro-Prussian and Franco-Prussian Wars, for which he was awarded the Iron Cross 2nd Class. He married Bertha Neumann on 15 October 1872. He was commander of the Lauenburgisches Jäger Bataillon Nr. 9 for two years in Ratzeburg before he was deployed to Africa in 1894. In 1894 Trotha was appointed commander of the colonial forces in German East Africa and was ruthlessly successful in suppressing uprisings there, including the Wahehe Rebellion. While temporarily posted to Imperial China as Brigade Commander of the East Asian Expedition Corps, he was involved in suppressing the Boxer Rebellion. On 3 May 1904 he was appointed Commander in Chief of German South West Africa and was directed to crush the native Herero rebellion.

=== Herero and Nama genocide ===
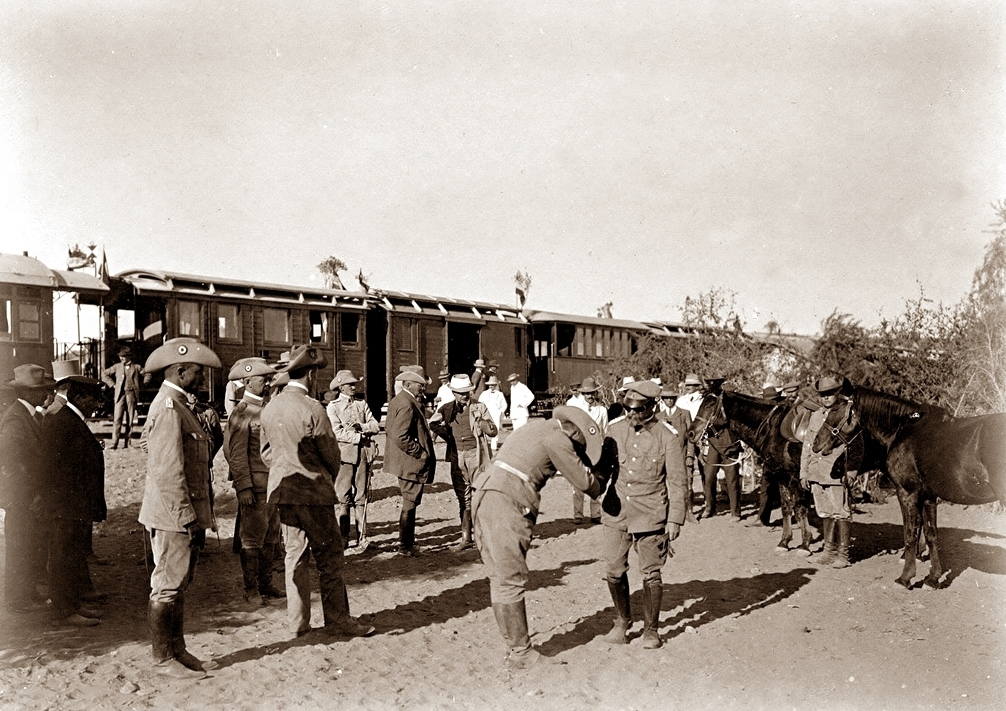
Trotha being greeted by a German officer following his arrival in South-West Africa in June 1904

Trotha arrived in South West Africa on 11 June 1904, when the war against the Herero had been raging for five months. The German command up to that time had minimal success against the Herero guerrilla tactics. Initially, he too suffered losses. In October 1904 General von Trotha devised a new battle plan to end the uprisings by the Herero. At the Battle of Waterberg, he issued orders to encircle the Herero on three sides so that the only escape route was into the waterless Omaheke-Steppe, a western arm of the Kalahari Desert. The Herero fled into the desert and Trotha ordered his troops to poison water holes, erect guard posts along a 240-kilometre (150 mi) line and shoot on sight any Herero, be they man, woman or child, who attempted to escape. To make his attitude to the Herero absolutely clear, Trotha then issued the Vernichtungsbefehl, or extermination order:

I, the great general of the German soldiers, send this letter to the Hereros. The Hereros are German subjects no longer. They have killed, stolen, cut off the ears and other parts of the body of wounded soldiers, and now are too cowardly to want to fight any longer. I announce to the people that whoever hands me one of the chiefs shall receive 1,000 marks, and 5,000 marks for Samuel Maherero. The Herero nation must now leave the country. If it refuses, I shall compel it to do so with the 'long tube' (cannon). Any Herero found inside the German frontier, with or without a gun or cattle, will be executed. I shall spare neither women nor children. I shall give the order to drive them away and fire on them. Such are my words to the Herero people.

He further gave orders that:

This proclamation is to be read to the troops at roll-call, with the addition that the unit that catches a captain will also receive the appropriate reward, and that the shooting at women and children is to be understood as shooting above their heads, so as to force them to run [away]. I assume absolutely that this proclamation will result in taking no more male prisoners, but will not degenerate into atrocities against women and children. The latter will run away if one shoots at them a couple of times. The troops will remain conscious of the good reputation of the German soldier.

Trotha defended his policies later in his life. "It was and is my policy to use force with terrorism and even brutality." An undisclosed German soldier was reported to have said of the massacres "...the death rattle of the dying and the shrieks of the mad...they echo in the sublime stillness of infinity." Trotha's tactics were in marked distinction to that of the Herero leaders, who were, in the main, careful to ensure that only soldiers were attacked.

Trotha's methods caused public outcry, which led the Imperial Chancellor Bernhard von Bülow to ask Emperor Wilhelm II to relieve Trotha of his command. This, however, was too late to help the Herero, as the few survivors had been herded into concentration camps and used as labour for German businesses, where many died of overwork, malnutrition or disease. Prior to the uprisings, there were estimated to be 80,000 Herero. The 1911 census records 15,000.

Trotha's troops also routed the Nama. On 22 April 1905 he sent a message to the Nama, suggesting they surrender, and mentioning the fate of the Herero:

The Nama who chooses not to surrender and lets himself be seen in German territory will be shot, until all are exterminated. Those who, at the start of the rebellion, committed murder against whites or have commanded that whites be murdered have, by law, forfeited their lives. As for the few not defeated, it will fare with them as it fared with the Herero, who in their blindness also believed that they could make war successfully on the powerful German Emperor and the great German people. I ask you, where are the Herero today?

Approximately 10,000 Nama died during the fighting, the remaining 9,000 were confined to concentration camps.

On 2 November 1905, Trotha was awarded the Pour le Mérite for his services in Africa. 17 days later, Lothar von Trotha returned to Germany, and was retired in the next year. In 1910 he was given the character of a General of the Infantry. Trotha died of typhoid fever (bilious fever) on 31 March 1920 in Bonn.

== Legacy ==
Trotha (wearing slouch hat) in Hamburg, c. 1905

In 1933, the Nazi authorities had named a street in Munich as "von Trotha Straße". In 2006, the Munich city council officially decided to change the name of this street to "Herero Straße" in honour of the general's victims.

Otjiwarongo, Namibia had a street named after von Trotha, since "long before independence". In 2016, calls to rename this street surfaced, and the municipality promised to initiate the renaming in 2017. The renaming would not occur until 2024, where the street was renamed to "Ohamakari".

As General von Trotha has no living descendants, some of his distant relations traveled to Omaruru in October 2007 by invitation of the local Herero chiefs and publicly apologised for his actions. Wolf-Thilo von Trotha, a member of the family, said, "We, the von Trotha family, are deeply ashamed of the terrible events that took place 100 years ago. Human rights were grossly abused that time."

On 16 August 2004 the German government under Gerhard Schröder officially apologized for the genocide, but rejected calls to pay reparations to the descendants of the Herero and Nama. "We Germans accept our historic and moral responsibility and the guilt incurred by Germans at that time," said Heidemarie Wieczorek-Zeul, Germany's development aid minister. In addition, she admitted the massacres were equivalent to genocide. The two countries have generally had a good relationship since and Germany has tailored economic and political packages for the people of Namibia.

In May 2021, the German government officially recognized the genocide and agreed to pay €1.1 billion over 30 years to fund projects in communities that were impacted by the genocide.

== See also ==
- German colonial empire
