= Battle of Ongulumbashe =

South African heliborne attack on a SWAPO military camp in the 1960s

- Part of the South African Border War
Date	26 August 1966
Location	Ongulumbashe, South West Africa Battle of Ongulumbashe (Namibia) 15°7′3″S 16°5′11″E
Result	South African victory

Belligerents
South Africa	SWAPO

Commanders and leaders
(South Africa) Jan Blaauw (South Africa) Pat Dillon	Unknown

Units involved
SADF; SAP	SWAPO

Strength
42 paratroops and police 7 Alouette III helicopters	17 Insurgents

Casualties and losses
None	2 killed 1 wounded 8 captured

The Battle of Ongulumbashe (also known as Operation Blouwildebees) was an armed confrontation between the South African Defence Force (SADF)/South African Police (SAP) and the South West African People's Organization (SWAPO) at Ongulumbashe in northern South West Africa (today Namibia). Though SWAPO had already carried out several attacks in 1965 and early 1966, the battle marked the first time that elements of the South African security forces directly clashed with SWAPO insurgents and is considered to be the start of the South African Border War.

== Background ==
In 1962, the UN General Assembly adopted the position that South Africa's mandate over South West Africa (in force since the end of World War I) should be terminated and that the territory should be given independence. South Africa, at this time under the rule of the Apartheid regime, refused to recognize this decision and no substantial moves towards independence for the territory were made. The inaction of the South Africans emboldened SWAPO, who had been preparing for an armed struggle against the South African authorities in South West Africa since the early 1960s.

== SWAPO Infiltration and South African Response ==
In September 1965, the first group of SWAPO insurgents (numbering only about seven men) moved across the thinly guarded Angola/SWA border and began attacking targets in northern South West Africa. These included a local administrative building, a local tribal headman suspected to be in the employ of the South Africans, and a Portuguese shop owner. SWAPO established a camp at Ongulumbashe (modern spelling: Omugulugwombashe) from which further operations could be conducted. Incidentally, this was the only semi-permanent camp established by SWAPO on South West African soil for the duration of the conflict. SWAPO's presence in the region soon expanded until the total number of active insurgents numbered about 17.

By early 1966, the South African authorities had become aware of SWAPO's presence and two Alouette III helicopters were dispatched to the region to aid the detachment of South African police assigned to guard the border. Using an informer within the group of insurgents, the South Africans were able to pinpoint the location of the SWAPO guerillas to Ongulumbashe. To dislodge the guerillas, the South Africans devised Operation Blouwildebees, the first ever heliborne assault undertaken by the South African armed forces.

== Battle ==
On the 26th of August 1966, seven Alouette III helicopters, each carrying a six man assault team, took off from Ruacana and flew South East towards Ongulumbashe. The helicopters deposited the combined force of South African police and paratroops at pre-determined locations around the camp. A gun-battle ensued between the insurgents, entrenched around the camp, and the security forces. The South Africans quickly overpowered the insurgents at the camp, killing 1, wounding 1, and capturing 8. A short follow-up operation was then launched in which another insurgent was killed. At least 2 insurgents were known to have escaped the battle.

== Aftermath ==
Despite the South African's success, the battle did not immediately stop SWAPO activities in Ovamboland. From the remainder of 1966 and into 1967, SWAPO would carry out a number of attacks, including arson and the murder of tribal headmen. However, by September 1967, 8 insurgents had been killed and 59 captured. These losses effectively curtailed SWAPO operations in Ovamboland until the early 1970s. However, small scale SWAPO attacks and infiltrations continued to take place.

== Bibliography ==
- Lord, Dick (2008). From Fledgling to Eagle. The South African Airforce During the Border War. 30 South Publishers (Pty) Ltd. ISBN 978-1-928359-07-4.
- Steenkamp, Willem (2016). South Africa's Border War 1966–1989. Tafelberg. ISBN 978-0-624-07690-2.
