= Herero people =

Bantu ethnic group of southwest Africa

Herero
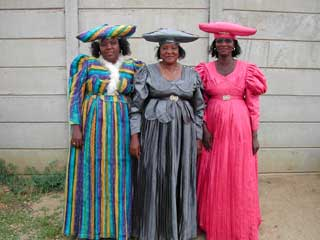
- Herero women

Total population
- 329,000

Regions with significant populations
- Namibia: 178,987 (2023 Census)
- Angola: 25,000
- Botswana: 19,000

Languages
- Herero (Otjiherero), English, Namibian Black German (rare)

Religion
- Christianity, Traditional faith

Related ethnic groups
- Ovambo, Ovimbundu and other Bantu peoples

Herero
- Person: OmuHerero
- People: OvaHerero
- Language: OtjiHerero
- Country: Hereroland

The Herero (Otjiherero: Ovaherero) are a Bantu ethnic group inhabiting parts of Southern Africa. 178,987 Namibians identified as Ovaherero in the 2023 census. They speak Otjiherero, a Bantu language. Though the Herero primarily reside in Namibia, there are also significant populations in Botswana and Angola, and a small number in South Africa. The Hereros in Botswana and South Africa are there because of displacement during the 1904–1908 genocide committed by the German Empire.

== Overview ==
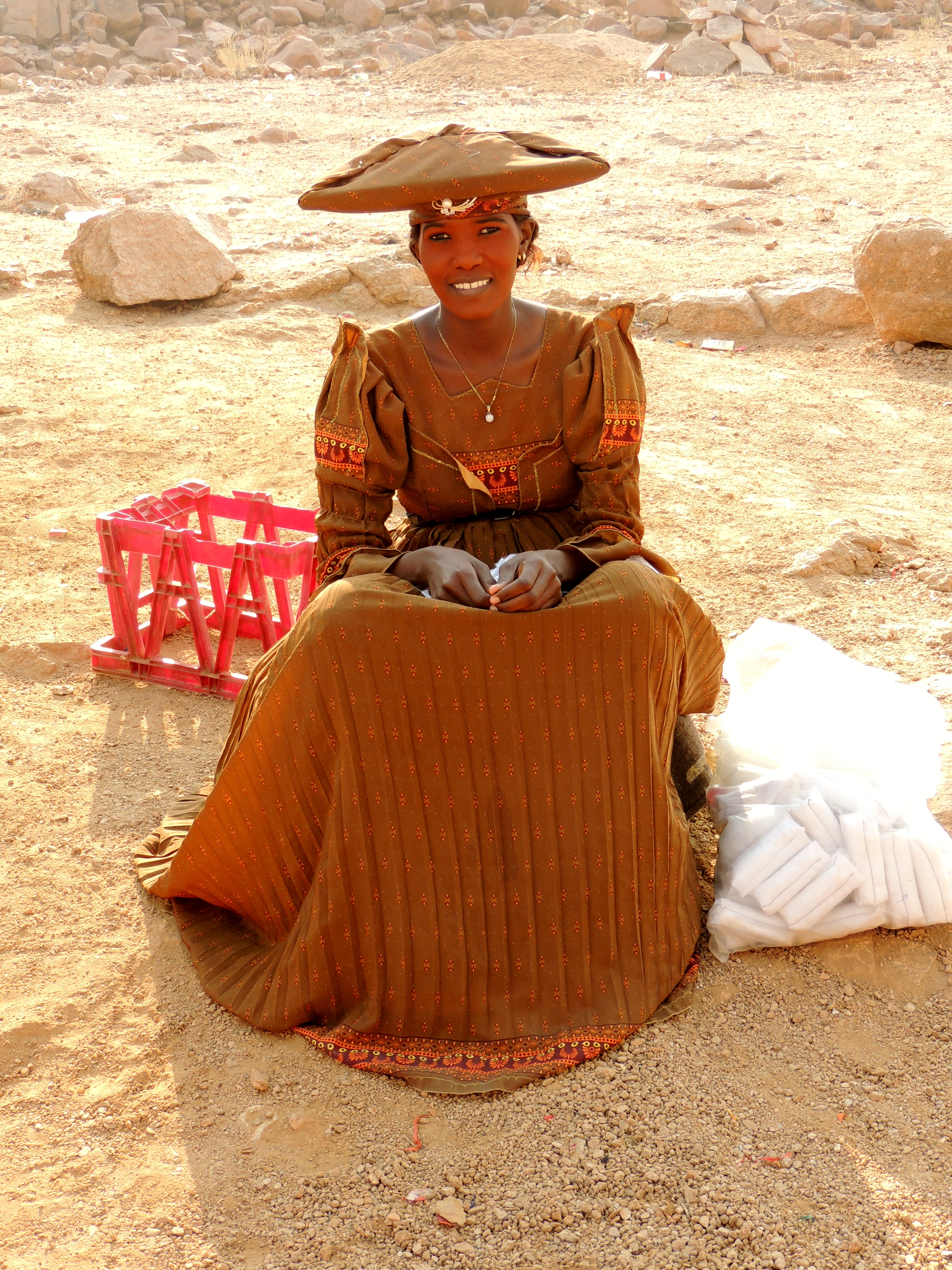
Herero woman in traditional dress.

Unlike most Bantu, who are primarily subsistence farmers, the Herero are traditionally pastoralists. They make a living tending livestock. Cattle terminology in use among many Bantu pastoralist groups testifies that Bantu herders originally acquired cattle from Cushitic pastoralists inhabiting Eastern Africa. After the Bantu settled in Eastern Africa, some Bantu nations spread south. Linguistic evidence also suggests that the Bantu borrowed the custom of milking cattle from Cushitic peoples; either through direct contact with them or indirectly via Khoisan intermediaries who had acquired both domesticated animals and pastoral techniques from Cushitic migrants.

Though the Herero primarily reside in Namibia, there are also significant populations in Botswana and Angola. In Botswana, the Hereros or Ovaherero are mostly found in Maun and some villages surrounding Maun. These villages among others are Sepopa, Toromuja, Karee and Etsha. Some of them are at Mahalapye. In the South eastern part of Botswana they are at Pilane. There are also a few of them in the Kgalagadi South, that is Tsabong, Omawaneni, Draaihoek and Makopong Villages.

=== Organization ===
The Herero are related to several groups including the Himba, Tjimba (Cimba), Mbanderu these groups are subgroups of OvaHerero but many people want a new group name as OvaHerero and OvaHerero is confusing being sub groups of the OvaHerero, However, the OvaTjimba,OvaHimba and (historically together called Uraha) though they speak a language related to OtjiHerero, they are physically distinct indigenous hunter-gatherers.

The leadership of the Ovaherero is distributed over several heads of clans of which some are more prominent and referred as royal houses, among them:

- Ovaherero Traditional Authority, of the Ovaherero central governance system established in 1863, chief Hoze Riruako
- Maharero Royal Traditional Authority, chief Tjinaani Maharero
- Zeraeua Royal Traditional Authority at Omaruru
- Ovambanderu Royal Traditional Authority, chief Eben Nguvauva
- Onguatjindu Royal Traditional Authority at Okakarara, chief Sam Kambazembi

Since conflicts with the Nama people in the 1860s necessitated Ovaherero unity, they also have a paramount chief ruling over all clans of Ovaherero, although there is currently an interpretation that such paramount chieftaincy violates the Traditional Authorities Act, Act 25 of 2000.

=== Paramount Chiefs ===
The highest office is that of the Paramount Chief, the leader of all Herero people. The position is vacant and in dispute, and so far, no formal gazetting has been done by the Ministry of Urban and Rural Development. Potential candidates are Dr Hoze Riruako (elected by the Ovaherero Traditional Authority, OTA) and Dr Hoze Riruako . Meanwhile, Chief Vipuira Kapuuo from Ovitoto is acting in the position since Rukoro's death.

The genealogy of the Paramount Chiefs of the Herero is:

- Vekuii Rukoro (2014-2021) In June 2014, when Riruako died, the chairman of the Chiefs Council, Tumbee Tjombe, who was deputized by Vipuira Kapuuo, became the acting Paramount Chief. In July of the same year, Tjombe also died, and a senior traditional councilor, Tjipene Keja, was elected in August 2014 by the Chiefs' Council to serve as the acting Paramount Chief. Acting Paramount Chief Keja convened a senate meeting in September 2014 at Ehungiro, to elect the substantive Paramount Chief, and Advocate Vekuii Rukoro emerged as the sole candidate.
- Kuaima Riruako (1978–2014) In March 1978, after the assassination of Kapuuo, the chairperson of the Chiefs' Council, Senior Headman Gerson Hoveka became the acting Paramount Chief. A senate meeting was convened in the same year where Kuaima Riruako was elected, as the substantive Paramount Chief.
- Clemens Kapuuo (1970–1978) Due to the advanced age of Kutako, in 1960 Clemens Kapuuo, who was the secretary of the Chiefs Council, was elected as deputy Paramount Chief to take the mantle in the eventuality that Kutako passes on. In 1970, two days following Kutako's death, Kapuuo assumed the position of a substantive Paramount Chief.
- Hosea Kutako (1917–1970) Following the Herero Wars from 1904 to 1908, Paramount Chief Samuel Maharero fled to Bechuanaland (now Botswana). This created a leadership vacuum amongst the Ovaherero, more so when the Ovaherero were incarcerated into the concentration camps. When the Ovaherero were released from the concentration camps in 1915, an election was held in 1916/17 among the clan leaders and their councillors to choose between two candidates, Hosea Kutako and Kaevaka Kamaheke, for the position of Acting Paramount Chief. Hosea Kutako emerged victorious, and was later confirmed as Paramount Chief in 1920.
- Samuel Maharero (1890–1917) When Paramount Chief Maharero died in 1890, his son Samuel Maharero assumed the position in 1892 with the aid of the German Administrative Governor Theodor Leutwein.
- Maharero ka Tjamuaha (1861–1890) With Tjamuaha's death in 1861, hostilities started between the Nama people and the Herero. This made it necessary for the clans to unite as a group. That is how, on 15 June 1863 at Otjizingue (now Otjimbingwe), Maharero was elected as the commander-in-chief of all Herero clans. Later Maharero was elected the first Paramount Chief of the Herero people.

== History ==
=== Pre-colonial ===
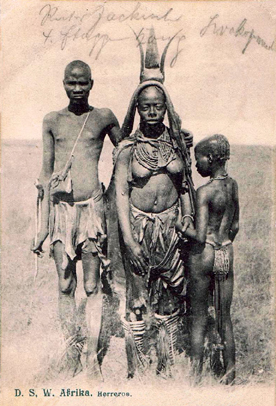
Herero, at the end of the 19th century

In the 15th century, the Herero migrated to what is now Namibia from the east and established themselves as herdsmen. In the beginning of the 19th century, the Nama from South Africa, who already possessed some firearms, entered the land and were followed, in turn, by white merchants and German missionaries. At first, the Nama began displacing the Herero, leading to bitter warfare between the two groups, which lasted the greater part of the 19th century. Later the two peoples entered into a period of cultural exchange.

=== German South West Africa ===
During the late 18th century, the first Europeans began entering to permanently settle the land. Primarily in Damaraland, German settlers acquired land from the Herero in order to establish farms. In 1883, the merchant Franz Adolf Eduard Lüderitz entered into a contract with the native elders. The exchange later became the basis of German colonial rule. The territory became a German colony under the name of German South West Africa.

Soon after, conflicts between the German colonists and the Herero herdsmen began. Controversies and disputes frequently arose over access to land and water, but also the legal discrimination against the native population by the white immigrants.

In the late 19th and early 20th century, imperialism and colonialism in Africa peaked, affecting especially the Hereros and the Namas. European powers were seeking trade routes and railways, as well as more colonies. Germany officially claimed their stake in a South African colony in 1884, calling it German South West Africa until it was taken over in 1915. The first German colonists arrived in 1892, and conflict with the indigenous Herero and Nama people began. As in many cases of colonization, the indigenous people were not treated fairly.

Between 1893 and 1903, the Herero and Nama peoples' land and cattle were progressively being taken by German colonial settlers. The Herero and Nama resisted expropriation over the years. In 1903, the Herero people learnt that they were to be placed in reservations, leaving more room for colonialists to own land and prosper. The Herero, 1904, and Nama, 1905, began a great rebellion that lasted until 1907, ending with the near destruction of the Herero people. "The war against the Herero and Nama was the first in which German imperialism resorted to methods of genocide...." Roughly 80,000 Herero lived in German South West Africa at the beginning of Germany's colonial rule over the area, while after their revolt was defeated, they numbered approximately 15,000. In a period of four years, approximately 65,000 Herero people were killed.

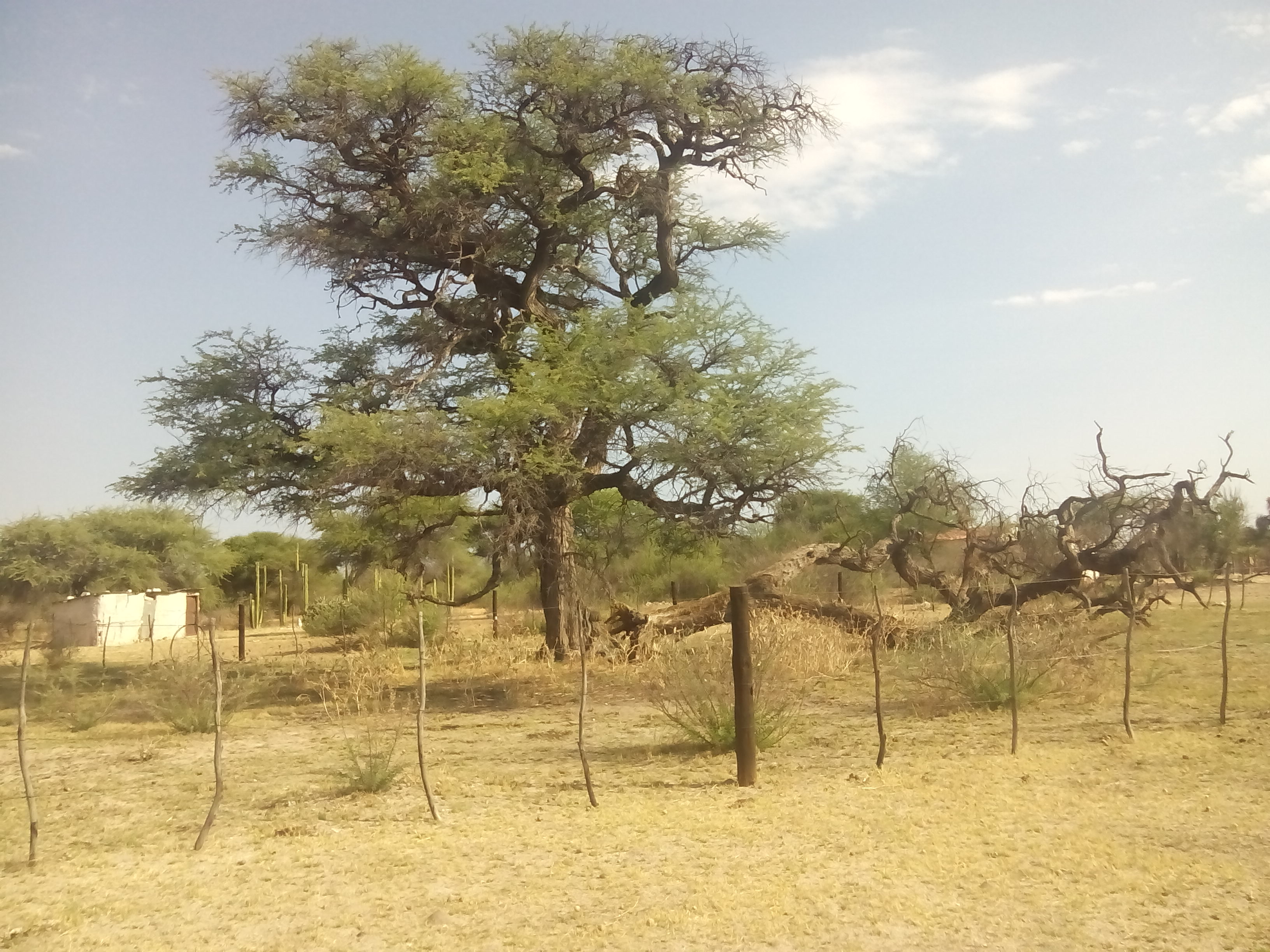
Omuti-ngau-zepo (The tree must be removed) in Otjinene from which many Herero people were hanged to death.

Samuel Maharero, the Paramount Chief of the Herero, led his people in a large-scale uprising on January 12, 1904, against the Germans. The Herero, surprising the Germans with their uprising, had initial success.

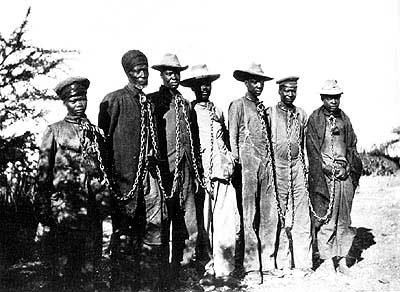
Herero chained during the Herero and Nama genocide, perpetrated by the German Empire

German General Lothar von Trotha took over as leader in May 1904. In August 1904, he devised a plan to annihilate the Herero nation. The plan was to surround the area where the Herero were, leaving but one route for them to escape into the desert. The Herero battled the Germans, and the losses were minor. It was when the majority had escaped through the only passage made available by the Germans, and had been systematically prevented from approaching watering holes, that starvation began to take its toll. It was then that the Herero uprising changed from war to genocide. Lothar von Trotha called the conflict a "race war". He declared in the German press that "no war may be conducted humanely against non-humans" and issued an "annihilation order": "... The Herero are no longer German subjects. They have murdered and stolen, they have cut off the ears, noses, and other body parts of wounded soldiers, now out of cowardice they no longer want to fight. I tell the people: Anyone who delivers one captain will receive 1,000 marks, whoever delivers Samuel Maharero will receive 5,000 marks. The Herero people must, however, leave the land. If the populace does not do this, I will force them with the Groot Rohr [cannon]. Within the German borders every Herero, with or without a gun, with or without cattle, will be shot. I will no longer accept women and children, I will drive them back to their people or I will have them shot at."

On the 100th anniversary of the genocide, German Minister for Economic Development and Cooperation Heidemarie Wieczorek-Zeul commemorated the dead on site and apologised for the crimes on behalf of all Germans. Hereros and Namas demanded financial reparations; however, in 2004 there was only minor media attention in Germany on this matter.

== Culture ==
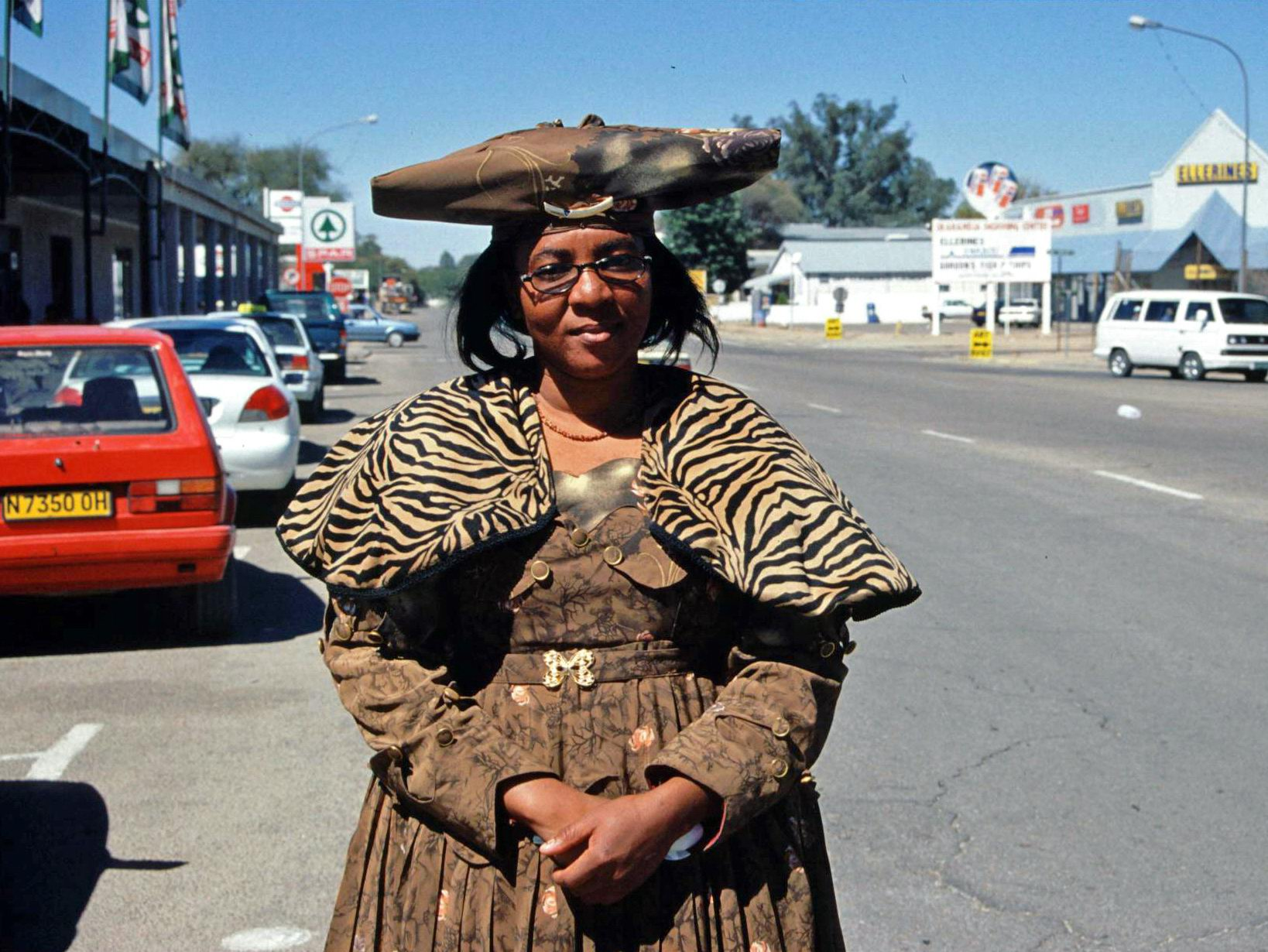
Herero woman in Okahandja, Namibia

The Herero are traditionally cattle-herding pastoralists, thus cattle is the mainstay of their economy. Historically cattle raids occurred between Herero clans, but Hereroland (Ehi rOvaherero) belongs to all the Ovaherero and has no fixed boundaries.

In the 1920s, Kurt Falk recorded in the Archiv für Menschenkunde that the Ovahimba retained a "medicine-man" or "wizard". He wrote, "When I asked him if he was married, he winked at me slyly and the other natives laughed heartily and declared to me subsequently that he does not love women, but only men. He nonetheless enjoyed no low status in his tribe."

The Herero have a double descent system. A person traces their heritage through their mother's lineage, or eanda (plural: omaanda), and one gains clan leadership from their father's lineage, or oruzo (plural: otuzo). The Holy Fire okuruuo (OtjikaTjamuaha) of the Herero is located at Okahandja. During immigration, the fire was doused and quickly relit. From 1923 to 2011, it was situated at the Red Flag Commando. On Herero Day 2011, a group around Paramount Chief Kuaima Riruako claimed that this fire was facing eastwards for the past 88 years, while it should be facing towards the sunset. They removed it and placed it at an undisclosed location, a move that has stirred controversy among the Ovaherero community.

=== Dress ===
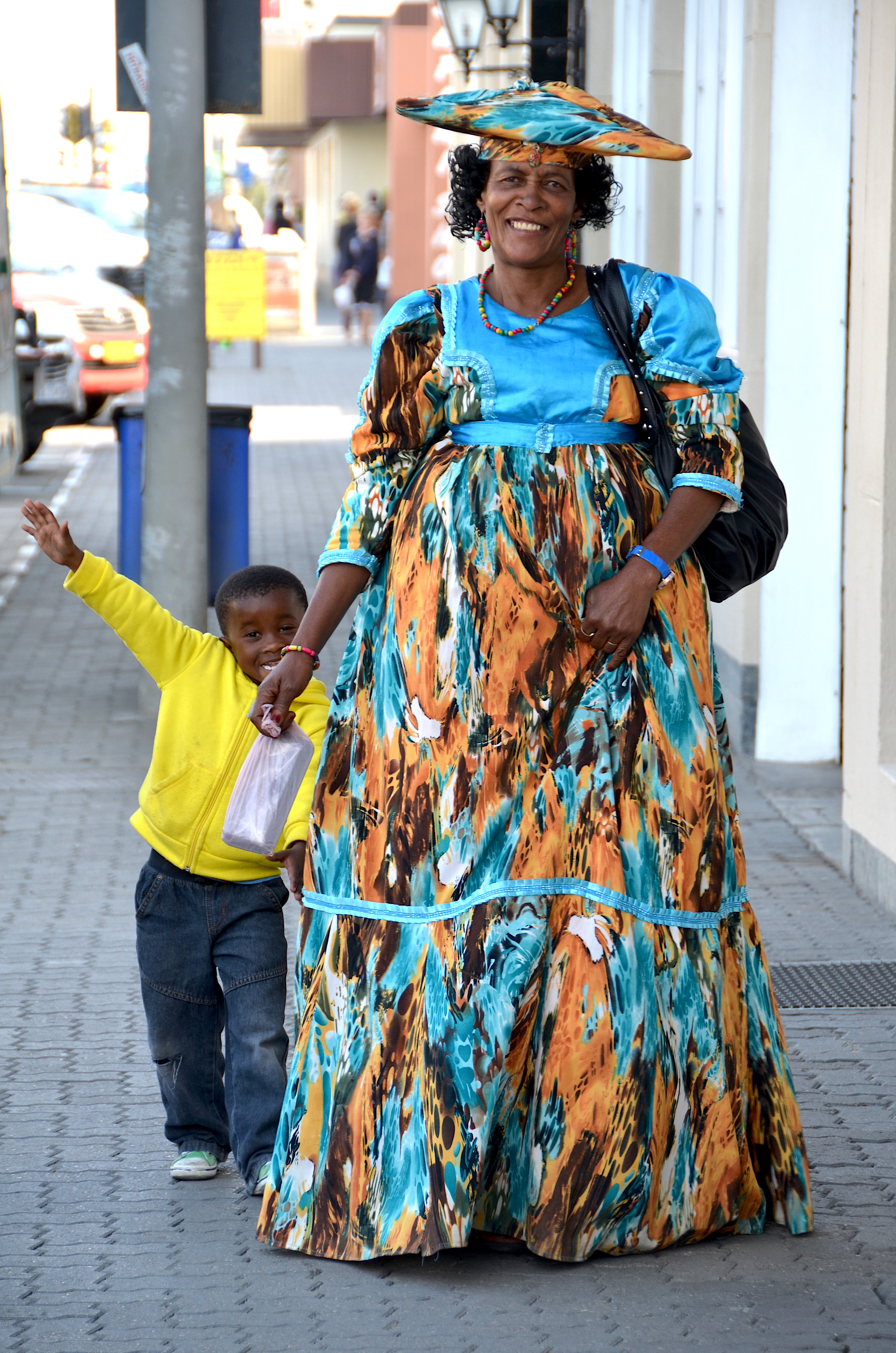
Traditionally the otjikaiva matches the dress

Through sharing a language and pastoral traditions, the Herero are a homogeneous people.

However, the Herero group in central Namibia was heavily influenced by Western culture during the colonial period, creating a whole new identity. The missionaries considered the shape of the traditional headdress Ekori, which symbolized the horns of cows (the main source of wealth of the people), as a symbol of the devil and rejected it. The dress of the Herero, and their eastern counterparts the Mbanderu, incorporates and appropriates the styles of clothing worn by their German colonizers. Though the attire was initially forced upon the Herero, it now operates as a new tradition and a point of pride.

During the 1904-07 war, Herero warriors would steal and wear the uniforms of German soldiers they had killed, believing that this transferred the dead soldiers' power to them. Today, on ceremonial occasions, Herero men wear military-style garb, including peaked caps, berets, epaulettes, aiguillettes and gaiters, "to honour the fallen ancestors and to keep the memories alive."

Herero women adopted the floor-length gowns worn by German missionaries in the late 19th century, but now make them in vivid colors and prints. Married and older Herero women wear the dresses, locally known as ohorokova, every day, while younger and unmarried women wear them mainly for special occasions. Ohorokova dresses are high-necked and have voluminous skirts lavishly gathered from a high waist or below the bust, incorporating multiple petticoats and up to ten metres of fabric. The long sleeves display sculptural volume: puffed from the shoulders or frilled at the wrists. Coordinating neckerchiefs are knotted around the neck. For everyday wear, dresses are ingeniously patchworked together from smaller pieces of fabric, which may be salvaged from older garments. Dresses made from a single material are reserved for special occasions.

The most distinctive feature of Herero women's dress is their horizontal horned headdress, the otjikaiva, which is a symbol of respect, worn to pay homage to the cows that have historically sustained the Herero. The headdresses can be formed from rolled-up newspaper covered in fabric. They are made to match or coordinate with dresses, and decorative brooches and pins attached to the centre front.

This dress style continues to evolve. In urban Windhoek, fashion designers and models are updating Herero dress for modern, younger wearers, including glamorous sheer and embellished fabrics. "Change is difficult, I understand, but people need to get used to the change," says designer McBright Kavari. "I'm happy to be a part of the change, to be winning souls of people and making people happy when they are wearing the Herero dress." Kavari has won the Best Herero Dress competition three times in a row, but has been criticised for raising the hem of the garment to the knee.

=== Language ===
A Herero speaker, recorded in Namibia.

The Herero language (Otjiherero) is the main unifying link among the Herero peoples. It is a Bantu language, part of the Niger–Congo family. Standard Herero is used in the Namibian media and is taught in schools throughout the country.

== Religion ==
Herero people believe in Okuruuo (holy fire), which is a link to their ancestors to speak to Ndjambi on their behalf. Modern-day Herero are mostly Christians, primarily Catholic, Lutheran, and Born-again Christian.

== Domestic animals ==
The Herero make a living out of rearing domestic animals.

=== Cattle ===
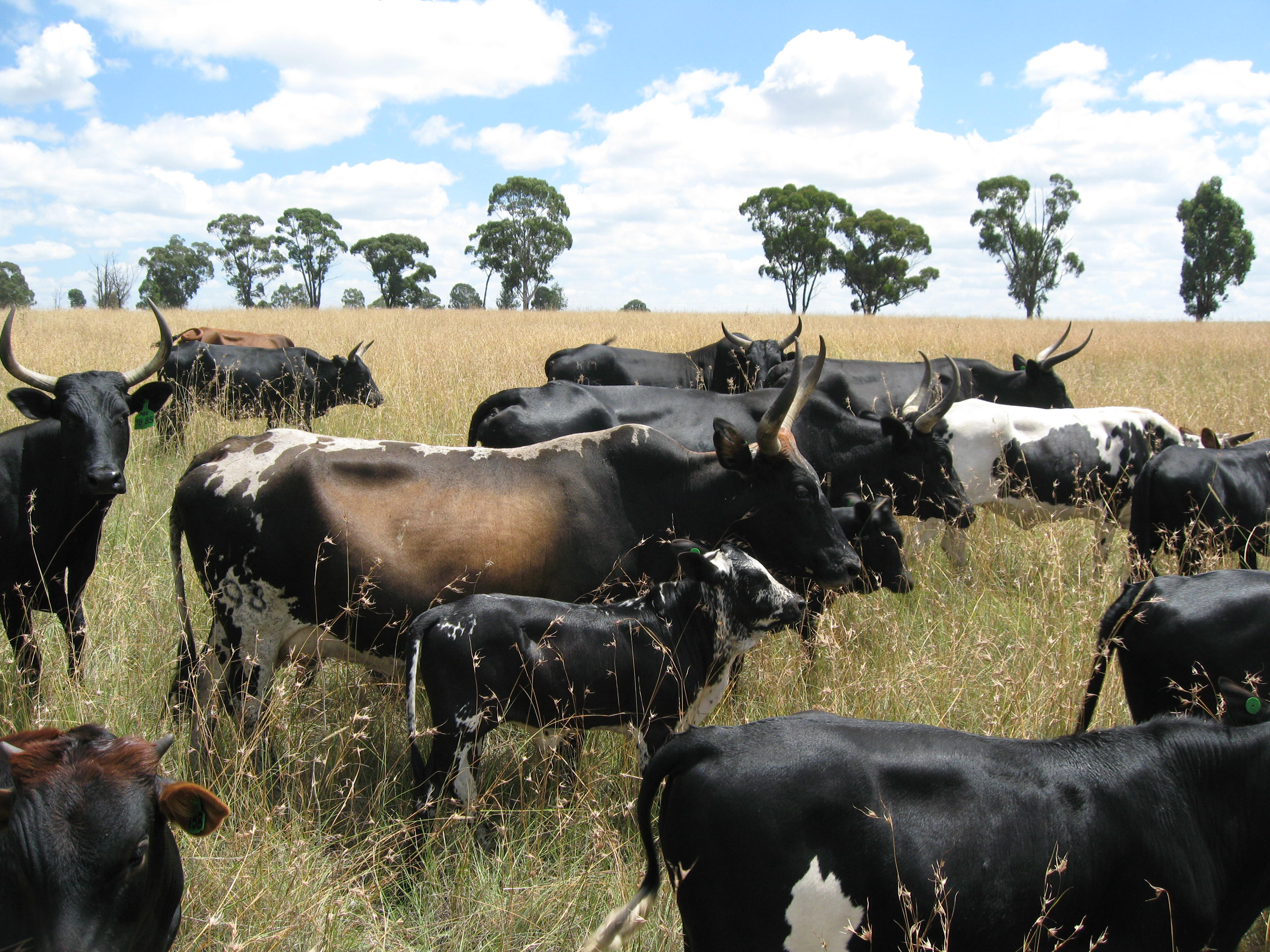
Nguni cattle

Cattle are the most valued domestic animals in the Herero culture, therefore cattle herding is the most significant and substantial activity for the Herero people. In the Herero culture the cattle herding and cattle trading activities are only conducted by males while females are responsible for milking cows, household chores, harvesting small field crops and taking care of the young children. As women are responsible for milking cows, they are also responsible for preparing the delicious sour milk called "Omaere" in the pre colonial times, the worth of an OmuHerero woman was measured by milk. Although males are responsible for the cattle trading activities the females do most of the trading such as bartering for other goods.

==== Cultural impact ====
The Herero people take pride in their cattle, hence the culture of Herero requires women to wear their iconic fabric hats shaped like cow horns. They believe that the more cattle one has, the richer one is, making cattle a symbol of wealth. In celebrations such as marriages, cattle is normally eaten, whereas religious or ancestral veneration ceremonies involve the sacrifice of cows or other animals.

=== Goats and sheep ===
Goats and sheep are kept for their meat. Goatskin is manufactured into child carriers and to create household ornaments. Goat dung, meanwhile, is considered medicinal; it is normally used to treat chickenpox.

=== Horses and donkeys ===
Horse and donkeys are common means of transport for the Herero. In cases of herding or searching for lost domestic animals, the Herero engage horses to carry out these activities.

Some Herero people are believed to consume donkey meat.

=== Dogs and chickens ===
In the Herero culture, dogs are used by men for both hunting and herding. The Herero people used to hunt to acquire meat, hide, and horns that are bartered for goods such as sugar, tea, and tobacco.

Chicken are kept for their meat and eggs.

== Herero in fiction ==
- A group of Herero living in Germany who were inducted into the German military during the Second World War play a major part in Thomas Pynchon's novel Gravity's Rainbow. The genocide under von Trotha plays a major role in another novel by the same author, V..
- German author Uwe Timm's novel Morenga, set in German southwest Africa, includes several Herero characters.
- A Portuguese-Herero mestiço protagonist is featured in Guy Saville's novel The Afrika Reich. The fictional story takes place in a 1952 Africa largely conquered by the Nazis who came away from World War II politically and economically empowered and relatively unopposed.
- In the historical novel Mama Namibia by Mari Serebrov, two perspectives of the 1904 genocide in German Southwest Africa are shown. The first is that of Jahohora, a 12-year-old Herero girl who survives alone in the veld for two years after her family is killed by German soldiers. The second is that of Kov, a Jewish doctor who volunteered to serve in the German military to prove his patriotism. As he witnesses the atrocities of the genocide, he rethinks his loyalty to the Fatherland.
- The Treatment of the Herero by German colonists is the subject of the 2012 play We Are Proud to Present a Presentation About the Herero of Namibia, Formerly Known as Southwest Africa, From the German Sudwestafrika, Between the Years 1884–1915 by Jackie Sibblies Drury.

Anthony Scholefield’s novel “The Eagles of Malice” published in 1968 depicts the developing response of a white Bechuanaland police-officer to the savagery of the Germans against the Hereros.

== See also ==
- History of Namibia
- Herero Day
