= Battle of Waterberg =

Decisive battle in the German campaign against the Herero

- Part of the Herero uprising
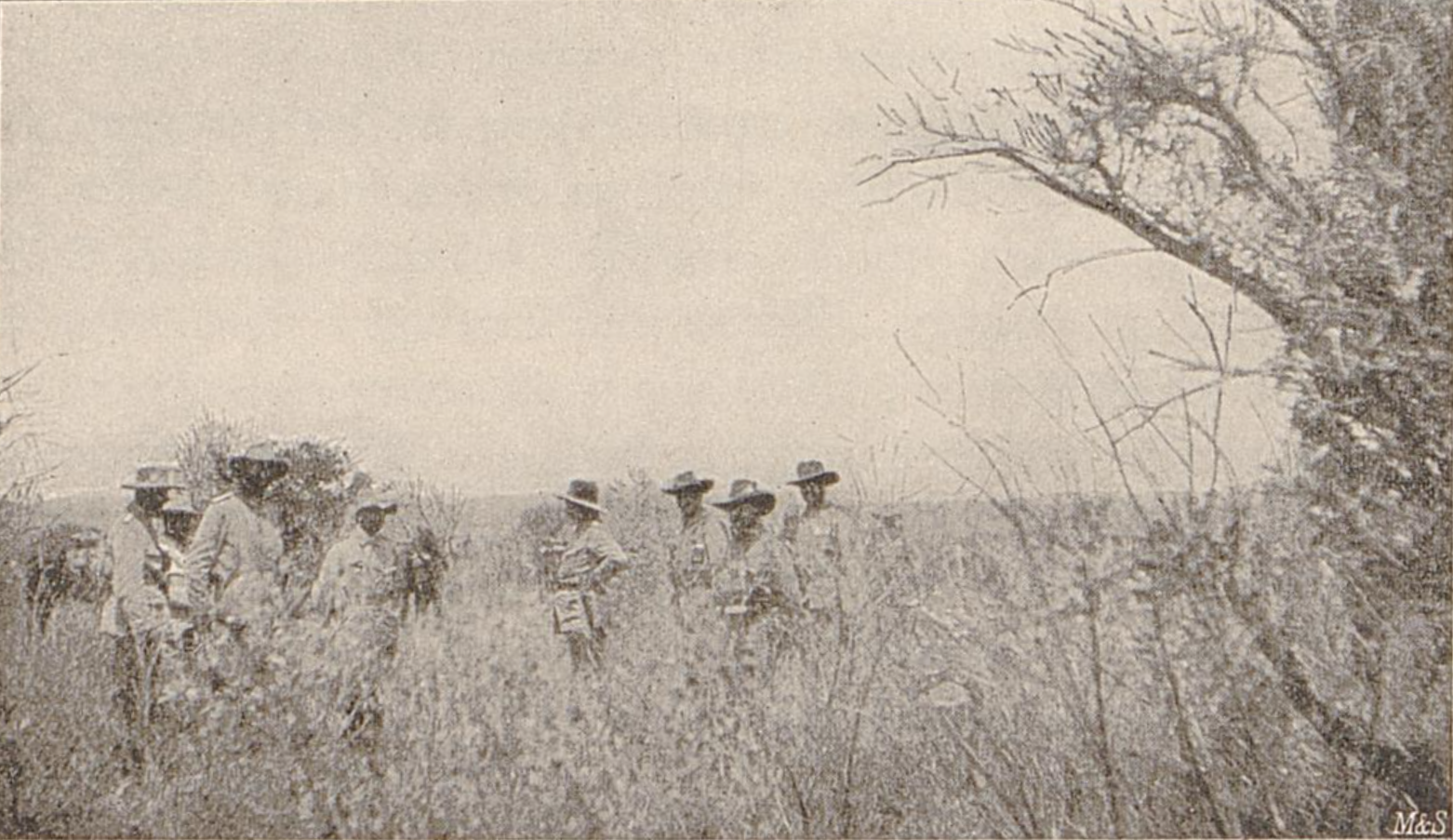
- General von Trotha and his staff at Hamakari (August 1904)
Date	11 August 1904
Location	20°31′0″S 17°14′0″E; Waterberg, German South West Africa (present day Namibia)
Result	German victory

Belligerents
German Empire	Herero

Commanders and leaders
(German Empire) Lieutenant General Lothar von Trotha	Samuel Maharero

Strength
2,000	3,500 – 6,000 warriors with their families

Casualties and losses
26 killed 60 wounded	Unknown, but high

The Battle of Waterberg (Battle of Ohamakari) took place on August 11, 1904, at the Waterberg, German South West Africa (modern day Namibia), and was the decisive battle in the Herero uprising.

== Armies ==
The German Imperial Forces were under the command of Lieutenant General Lothar von Trotha and numbered just over 1,500. They were armed with 1,625 modern rifles, 30 artillery pieces and 14 machine guns.

The Herero were under the command of Samuel Maharero and – in expectation of peace negotiations – had assembled some 3,500-6,000 warriors along with their families. The total number of Hereros in the area is estimated at 25,000 to 50,000. Some of them were armed with traditional close combat weapons called kirri.

== Preparations for battle ==
From the beginning of the Herero uprising in January 1904 until June 11, 1904, the German military efforts had been directed by colonial Governor Colonel Theodor Leutwein. Leutwein combined a policy of military pressure with communication with the Herero to negotiate a settlement to the hostilities. The Germans achieved moderate military success in a series of skirmishes before cornering the Herero at the Waterberg Plateau. However, the Kaiserreich replaced Leutwein with Lieutenant General Lothar von Trotha, expecting Trotha to end the revolt with a decisive military victory.

The Waterberg Plateau where the Herero concentrated lay 100 km east of the railhead source of German supplies, so Trotha spent nearly three months (June, July, and part of August) transporting troops and supplies by ox-drawn carts to the site of the expected battle. In the meantime, the Herero, estimated around 60,000 men, women, and children, with an equal number of cattle, drew on meager grass and water supplies while awaiting overtures from the Germans.

On the eve of the battle the Germans around the Waterberg were organized into six columns:

- First Lieutenant Richard Dietrich Volkmann - in the north near Otjenga
- Major Ludwig von Estorff - in the east near Okomiparum
- Major Hermann von der Heyde - in the southeast near Hamakari
- Lieutenant Colonel Karl Max Mueller (on the next day replaced by Major Karl Ludwig von Mühlenfels) - in the south near Ombuatjipiro
- Colonel Berthold Deimling - in the west near Okateitei
- Captain von Fiedler - in the northwest near Osondjache mountain

Trotha's headquarters, headed by his Chief of Staff Lieutenant Colonel Martin Chales de Beaulieu, was in the south near Mueller's position.

== Battle ==
Positions and German operational plan on the day before the battle

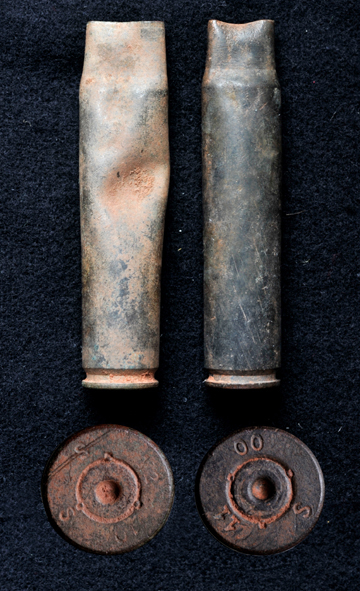
Two shell casings from the battlefield at the Waterberg, found in October 2012

Execution of Trotha's battle plan began on August 11, 1904, after a careful buildup of troops and supplies. The German commander intended part of his force to squeeze the Herero south of the Plateau with columns from the east and west while two more columns would seal off the escape route to the south and southeast. The commander of the southeastern blocking column, however, failed to maneuver his troops into position in a timely fashion, and to communicate that fact to Trotha. Meanwhile, the western advancing column did not stop at the appointed line and pressed the Herero through the unclosed gap created by the failure of the southeastern troops. The bulk of the Herero and their cattle escaped eastward into the Omaheke Desert.

The Waterberg military station was occupied by Herero mounted infantry and irregular guerrilla forces. These Herero forces were quickly defeated by colonial forces using breech-loading artillery and 14 Maxim belt-fed machine guns at the Battle of Waterberg on August 11, but the survivors escaped into the desert. Trotha and his staff were unprepared for their failure to decisively defeat the Herero. At the end of an attenuated supply line and occupying ground thoroughly foraged by the Herero, the Germans could not immediately pursue. While signaling to Berlin a complete victory and subsequent pursuit, Trotha began to move his force westward, back toward the railroad.

The Germans had won a tactical victory by driving the Herero from Waterberg, but had failed in their intentions to end the uprising with a decisive battle. Trotha soon thereafter ordered the pursuit of the Herero eastward into the desert, intending to prevent Herero reorganization by depriving them of pastureland and watering holes. This campaign caused most of the deaths of Herero people during the Revolt, and resulted in the notorious extermination order of October 2, 1904.

== Aftermath ==
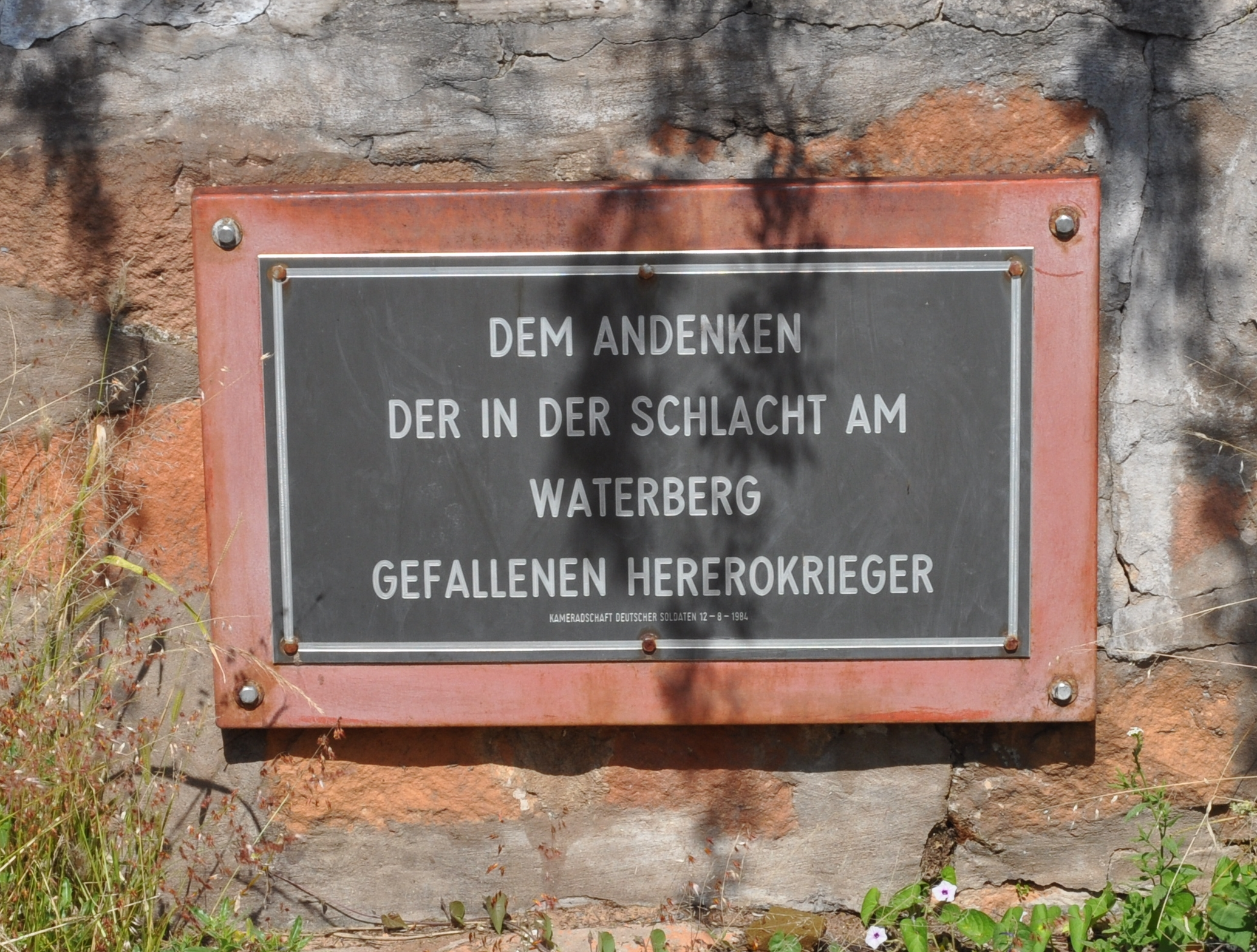
Memorial to fallen Herero warriors at the Waterberg Plateau

On 2 October, von Trotha issued the infamous extermination order: "Any Herero found within the German borders with or without a gun, with or without cattle, will be shot". While most Herero escaped the battle, their retreat led to the near extinction of their people in an act of genocide. Many of the refugee Hereros died of thirst and exhaustion during their trek through the desert. German patrols later found skeletons around holes 8–16 m (25–50 ft) deep dug in a futile attempt to find water. Tens of thousands of the Herero died of thirst, starvation, or disease. Those who attempted surrender were summarily shot. After Trotha's extermination order was countermanded by Berlin, captured survivors were sent to a concentration camp at Shark Island.

Despite extensive German patrols and a large bounty offered for his capture, Samuel Maharero and about 1,000 of his men managed to cross the Kalahari Desert into the Bechuanaland Protectorate. The British offered the Hereros asylum on the condition that they would not continue their revolt on British soil. The site of the battle is today located within Waterberg Plateau Park. A military graveyard exists where the German soldiers who perished in the Battle of Waterberg are buried. German participants in the battle were awarded the South West Africa Commemorative Medal with a medal bar inscribed "Waterberg".
