= Fox Odendaal =

South African politician (1898–1966)

Frans Hendrik "Fox" Odendaal

Administrator of Transvaal Province of South Africa
- In office 1 November 1958 – 8 February 1966
- Preceded by: William Nicol
- Succeeded by: Sybrand Gerhardus Johannes van Niekerk

Personal details
- Born: 18 September 1898 Kimberley, Cape Colony
- Died: 8 February 1966 (aged 67) South Africa
- Profession: Politician

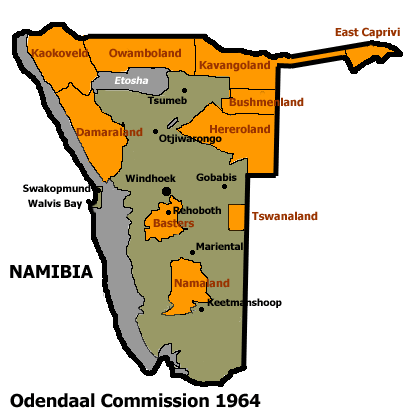
Map of Namibia with Odendaal Commission recommendations

Frans Hendrik "Fox" Odendaal (1898–1966) was a South African politician, administrator of the Transvaal province, best remembered for heading the commission that became known by his last name.

== Odendaal Commission ==
In 1962 Odendaal was appointed as head of the officially named "Commission of Enquiry into South-West Africa Affairs." Over time the commission came to be popularly called the "Odendaal Commission". The Commission finished its enquiry towards the end of 1963, but its findings were formally handed early in 1964. The Odendaal Report, as it was called, contained a series of proposals (the Odendaal Plan) regarding the establishment of territories dedicated to the "separate development" of the different ethnic groups in South-West Africa (Namibia today). The Odendaal Plan thoroughly described the different steps needed to establish in South-West Africa bantustans similar to those already in South Africa. The report was first rejected by the Special Committee on Decolonization of the United Nations (also known as the Committee of Twenty-four because of the number of members), and then by the General Assembly. Despite all this, the South African government started formal implementation of Odendaal's plan in 1968.
