= List of Namibian generals =

The following is a list of people who have attained the rank of General within the Namibian Army (NA).

== Key ==
Abbreviation	Rank
BRIG	Brigadier
BRIG GEN	Brigadier General
MAJ GEN	Major General
LT GEN	Lieutenant General

The ranks of General Officers changed in when the rank previously called Brigadier became known as Brigadier General.

Rank	Name	Last position held	Notes	Dates of service
LT GEN	Dimo Hamaambo	Chief of Defence Force	first CDF	1990–2000
LT GEN	Solomon Huwala	Chief of Defence Force	second CDF	1990–2005
LT GEN	Martin Shalli	Chief of Defence Force	Third CDF	1990–2011
LT GEN	Epaphras Denga Ndaitwah	Chief of Defence Force	Fourth CDF	1990–2013
LT GEN	John Mutwa	Chief of Defence Force	Fifth CDF	1990–2020
MAJ GEN	Peter Nambundunga	Army Commander	Third Army Commander	1990–2011
MAJ GEN	Tomas Hamunyela	Army Commander	Firth Army Commander	1990–2017
MAJ GEN	Nestor Shali Shalauda	Army Commander	Sixth Army Commander	1990–2019
MAJ GEN	Matheus Alueendo	Army Commander	Seventh Army Commander	1990-2022
MAJ GEN	Aktofel Nambahu	Army Commander	Eighth Army Commander	1990-Currently
MAJ GEN	Phillip Kamati	COS Joint Operations		1990–
MAJ GEN	Ben Kadhila	COS Joint Operations		1990–2018
Brig GEN	Leonard Nghishoongele	COS Joint Operations	Never promoted to Major General	1990–2019
MAJ GEN	Joshua Namhindo	COS Joint Operations		1990-Currently
MAJ GEN	Charles Namoloh	Chief Of Staff		1990–1995
MAJ GEN	Shaanika Amukwaya	Chief Of Staff Military Intelligence		1990–
MAJ GEN	David Mbandeka	DA to President		1990–
MAJ GEN	Jackobus A //Hoabeb	DA to President		1990–
BRIG GEN	Andreas Diyeve	Deputy Army Commander		1990-currently
BRIG GEN	Freddy Maiba	DA to President		1990-currently
BRIG GEN	Mathias Shiweda	Chief Of Staff Personnel		1990–2005
BRIG GEN	Athanasius Chimwandi	Chief Of Staff Personnel		1990–2010
BRIG GEN	Charles Soja	Chief of Staff Human Resources		1990–2016
BRIG GEN	John Robinson	Chief of Staff Human Resources		1990-Currently
BRIG GEN	Rauna Hamata	Director: Finance	first female General Officer	1990–2009
BRIG GEN	Jesaya Elago Kambonde	Director: Finance		1990–2011
BRIG GEN	Peter Heita			1990–
BRIG GEN	Joseph Kakoto	GOC 4 Arty Brigade		1990–2017
BRIG GEN	Ambrosius Kwedhi	GOC 4 Arty Brigade		1990-currently
BRIG GEN	Petrus Iilonga	GOC 4 Arty Brigade		1990–2021
BRIG GEN	Alweendo Namukwambi	GOC 4 Arty Brigade		1990-currently
BRIG GEN	Enos Hakuna	GOC 26 Mot Inf Brigade		1990–2017
BRIG GEN	Erasmus Amupolo	GOC 26 Mot Inf Brigade		1990–2014
BRIG GEN	Holden Uulenga	GOC 26 Mot Inf Brigade		1990–
BRIG GEN	Peter Shikolalye	GOC 26 Mot Inf Brigade		1990–2016
BRIG GEN	Epimacus Tshavuka	GOC 26 Mot Inf Brigade		1990–2019
BRIG GEN	Willem Shigwedha	GOC 26 Mot Inf Brigade		1990-Currently
BRIG GEN	Erastus Kashopola	GOC 21 Mot Inf Brigade		1990–2019
BRIG GEN	Martin Nangolo Shikomba	GOC 21 Mot Inf Brigade		1990-Incumbent
BRIG GEN	George Kalomho	GOC 12 Mot Inf Brigade		1990–2010
BRIG GEN	Peter Nghilukilwa	GOC 12 Mot Inf Brigade		1990–2016
BRIG GEN	Joel Kapala	GOC 12 Mot Inf Brigade		1990–2020
BRIG GEN	Frederick Siluzungila	Military School Commandant		1990–
BRIG GEN	Wilbard Shikongo	Military School Commandant		1990–2017
BRIG GEN	Malakia Nakandungile	Military School Commandant		1990–2009
BRIG GEN	Kashindi ya Kashindi	Military School Commandant		1990-currently
BRIG GEN	Bernard Nkawa	DA to DRC		1990–2018
BRIG GEN	Angunga David Shivute	DA to Russia		1990-currently
BRIG GEN	Karel Ndjoba	DA to Germany		1990–2014
MAJ GEN	Charles Shalumbu	DA to India		1990–
BRIG GEN	Titus Simon	DA to India		1990-currently
BRIG GEN	James Auala	Chief of Staff Logistics		1990–2005
BRIG GEN	S Amunyela	Chief of Staff Logistics		1990–2017
BRIG GEN	David Amutenya	Chief of Staff Logistics		1990-currently
BRIG GEN	S Haihambo	Chief of Staff ICT		1990–
BRIG GEN	Kongeni Shikufa	Chief of Staff ICT		1990–2019
BRIG GEN	Abisai Heita	Chief of Staff ICT		1990-currently
BRIG GEN	Sophia Ndeitunga	Chief of Staff Defence Health Services	Female officer	1990-currently
BRIG GEN	Ndapandula Jacob	Chief of Staff Defence Health Services	Female officer	-currently
BRIG GEN	Petrus Nathinge	Director Defence Central Staff		1990-currently
BRIG GEN	Ingrid Zemburuka	Director Defence Central Staff	Female Officer	unknown date-currently
BRIG GEN	Veikko Kavungo	Director Defence Legal Service		1990-currently
BRIG GEN	Helena Amutenya	Director Defence Legal Service		2007-currently
BRIG GEN	Mathew Shipulwa	Commandant Namibian Command and Staff College		1990-Currently
BRIG GEN	David Shiimbi	GOC Air Defence Brigade		1990–2016
BRIG GEN	Moses Shalongo Nghilifa	GOC Air Defence Brigade		1990–2019
BRIG GEN	Lasarus Hermann	GOC Air Defence Brigade		1990–2020
BRIG GEN	Simeon Shikwambi Mwaala	GOC Air Defence Brigade		1990-currently
BRIG GEN	Patrick Owen Orange	GOC Air Defence Brigade		1990-currently
BRIG GEN	Solomon Shilongo	Defence Inspector General		1990–2016
BRIG GEN	Fiina Amupolo	Defence Inspector General	Female Officer	1990-Unknown date
BRIG GEN	Blasius Ainima	Defence Inspector General		1990-2023
BRIG GEN	Bathromeus Shomeya	Deputy Army Commander		1990–unknown date
BRIG GEN	Mumba Thaddeus Mahela	Associate Dean: School of Military Science		1990–
