= Military ranks of Namibia =

The Military ranks of Namibia are the military insignia used by the Namibian Defence Force.

== Commissioned officer ranks ==
The rank insignia of commissioned officers.

| Rank group | General / flag officers | | | | Senior officers | | | Junior officers |
|---|---|---|---|---|---|---|---|---|---|---|
| Namibian Army |
| Namibian Army | General | Lieutenant general | Major general | Brigadier general | Colonel | Lieutenant colonel | Major | Captain | Lieutenant | Second lieutenant |
| Namibian Navy |
| Namibian Navy | Admiral | Vice admiral | Rear admiral | Rear admiral junior grade | Captain | Commander | Lieutenant commander | Lieutenant | Lieutenant junior grade | Ensign |
| Namibian Marine Corps |
| Namibian Marine Corps | | | | | Marine Commandant | Commander | Lieutenant commander | Lieutenant | Lieutenant (junior grade) | Ensign |
| Namibian Air Force |
| Namibian Air Force | Chief air marshal | Air marshal | Air vice marshal | Air commodore | Group captain | Wing commander | Squadron leader | Flight lieutenant | Flying officer | Pilot officer |
| Rank group | General / flag officers | | | | Senior officers | | | Junior officers |

== Other ranks ==
The rank insignia of non-commissioned officers and enlisted personnel.

| Rank group | Senior NCOs | | | | Junior NCOs | | Enlisted |
|---|---|---|---|---|---|---|---|
| Namibian Army | | | | | | | No insignia |
| Namibian Army | Warrant officer class 1 | Warrant officer class 2 | Staff sergeant | Sergeant | Corporal | Lance corporal | Private (or equivalent) |
| Namibian Navy | | | | | | | No insignia |
| Namibian Navy | Warrant officer class 1 | Warrant officer class 2 | Chief petty officer | Petty officer | Leading seaman | Able seaman | Seaman |
| Namibian Marine Corps | | | | | | | No insignia |
| Namibian Marine Corps | Warrant officer class 1 | Warrant officer class 2 | Chief petty officer | Petty officer | Leading seaman | Able seaman | Seaman |
| Namibian Air Force | | | | | | | No insignia |
| Namibian Air Force | Warrant officer class 1 | Warrant officer class 2 | Flight sergeant | Sergeant | Aircraftman | Leading aircraftman | Private (or equivalent) |
| Rank group | Senior NCOs | | | | Junior NCOs | | Enlisted |

Warrant Officer Class 1 Appointments
Any warrant officer class 1 could be posted to substantive posts, including

| Army | Air Force | Navy |
|---|---|---|
| Sergeant Major of the Namibian Defence Force | Sergeant Major of the Namibian Defence Force | Sergeant Major of the Namibian Defence Force |
| Sergeant Major of the Army | Sergeant Major of the Air Force | Master-at-Arms of the Navy |
| Formation Sergeant Major | Formation Sergeant Major | Command Master-at-Arms |
| Regimental Sergeant Major | Regimental Sergeant Major | Master-at-Arms |

== See also ==
- List of Namibian Generals
- List of Namibian admirals
- List of Namibian Air Officers
