= People's Liberation Army of Namibia =

Namibian political movement

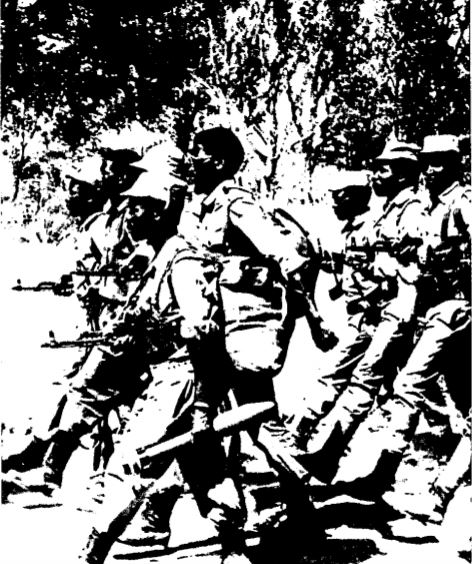
- PLAN insurgents on the march in Angola, 1980s.
- Leaders: PLAN Commander: Tobias Hainyeko (1962–67); Dimo Hamaambo (1967–90); SWAPO Secretary of Defence: Peter Nanyemba (1970–83); Peter Mweshihange (1983–90); Chairman of the SWAPO Military Council: Peter Nanyemba (1962–1982); Sam Nujoma (1982–90)
- Dates active: 1962–1990 (Note: The bulk of PLAN's manpower was demobilised between May and December 1989. However, a small number of PLAN troops remained in reserve until after Namibian independence. The last of PLAN's heavy equipment and troops were not repatriated to Namibia until 1990, when they were integrated with the Namibian Defence Force (NDF).)
- Headquarters: Dar es Salaam, Tanzania (1962–72); Lusaka, Zambia (1972–76); Lubango, Angola (1976–90)
- Active regions: South West Africa (Namibia), Angola, Zambia, Tanzania
- Ideology: Anti-colonialism; Anti-apartheid; Pan-Africanism; African socialism; African nationalism; Left-wing nationalism; Anti-imperialism; Scientific socialism; Communism; Marxism-Leninism
- Political position: Left-wing to far-left
- Size: 32,000 (1989)
- Wars: the South African Border War and Angolan Civil War

The People's Liberation Army of Namibia (PLAN) was the Military wing of the South West Africa People's Organisation (SWAPO). It fought against the South African Defence Force (SADF) and South West Africa Territorial Force (SWATF) during the South African Border War. Throughout its history, PLAN had both irregular insurgent and semi-conventional units, as well as an extensive recruitment network in rural South West Africa (Namibia). During the war most of its domestic activities consisted of mine warfare and acts of sabotage. PLAN initially lacked any standing units, and the bulk of operations were carried out by political exiles who spent cyclical periods residing in refugee camps in neighbouring states before launching raids inside South West Africa itself. By the end of the war, PLAN had 32,000 militants under arms, including three battalions of semi-conventional troops equipped with heavy weapons.

PLAN launched its largest and final offensive in late April and early May 1989. Thereafter, it ceased operations due to the ongoing peace process in South West Africa and withdrew to above the 16th parallel south. The bulk of PLAN's forces were disarmed and demobilized on its Angolan camps in late 1989 by the United Nations Transitional Assistance Group (UNTAG) and repatriated to South West Africa. A small number remained in reserve until after Namibian independence, when they were also repatriated. The last PLAN troops and equipment were returned to Namibia in mid-1990 for integration with the new Namibian Defence Force (NDF).

== Nomenclature ==
SWAPO's military wing was founded as the South West Africa Liberation Army (SWALA) in 1962. On 12 June 1968, the United Nations General Assembly adopted a resolution which proclaimed that, in accordance with the desires of its people, South West Africa be renamed "Namibia". Thereafter, SWAPO started using the term "Namibia" more frequently in its political discourse, and SWALA began to be referred to as the Namibian People's Army (NPA). It was not until 1973 that SWALA was formally renamed the People's Liberation Army of Namibia (PLAN). The title may have been adopted informally or semi-formally as early as 1969.

== History ==
=== Background ===
Flag of SWAPO.

The German Empire had administered Namibia as the colony of German South West Africa during the late nineteenth century. During World War I, South African troops under General Louis Botha occupied the colony and deposed the German colonial administration. The end of the war and the Treaty of Versailles left South Africa in possession of South West Africa under a League of Nations mandate. Under the terms of the mandate, the South African government was only permitted to administer South West Africa until its inhabitants were prepared for their own political self-determination. However, South Africa interpreted the mandate as a veiled annexation and made no attempt to prepare South West Africa for future autonomy.

During the late 1950s and early 1960s, pressure for global decolonisation and national self-determination began mounting on the African continent; these factors had a radical impact on South West African nationalism. Early nationalist organisations such as the South West African National Union (SWANU) and South West African People's Organisation (SWAPO) made determined attempts to establish indigenous political structures for an independent South West Africa. SWAPO first discussed the possibility of armed struggle at its party conference in Rehoboth in 1961. In March 1962, SWAPO president Sam Nujoma made the decision to begin recruiting South West Africans and send them for guerrilla training overseas.

=== Origins ===
SWAPO's decision to take up arms against the South African government may be linked to a variety of political factors. The success of indigenous anti-colonial guerrilla movements in French Indochina and French Algeria had the effect of encouraging nationalist parties to take up arms against colonial powers elsewhere. Furthermore, the armed revolution figured prominently in the rhetoric of Africa's leading statesmen at the time, such as Ahmed Ben Bella, Gamal Abdel Nasser, and Julius Nyerere, to whom these parties looked to for political inspiration. SWAPO's first attempt to recruit guerrillas also coincided with uprisings against colonial rule in several neighbouring territories, namely Angola.

Yet another incentive appeared when the Organisation of African Unity (OAU) formed a Liberation Committee for the purpose of encouraging anti-colonial movements. The Liberation Committee collected approximately £20,000 in contributions from OAU member states; these funds were promised to any South West African party on the condition they would use them for the express purpose of armed struggle. SWANU was denied the funds because it refused this condition. Accordingly, all the money was given to SWAPO. Most SWAPO members had studied in South Africa, where they had been radicalised by the activities of the African National Congress (ANC), namely the 1952 Defiance Campaign. They decided to model the movement's new military wing on that established by the ANC, Umkhonto we Sizwe.

Beginning in March 1962 Nujoma dispatched two recruiters, Lucas Pohamba and Elia Muatale, to Ovamboland, where SWAPO's traditional political base was located. Pohamba and Muatale succeeded in recruiting hundreds of volunteers for a new guerrilla army, which was subsequently named the South West African Liberation Army (SWALA). SWALA's headquarters was established in Dar es Salaam, the capital of Tanzania, which was sympathetic to SWAPO's cause. The Tanzanian government permitted SWALA to set up a training camp at Kongwa, where the volunteers would receive guerrilla training. The Soviet Union, Ghana, Egypt, Algeria, North Korea, and the People's Republic of China all offered free training programmes for SWALA recruits, provided they were able to make the necessary travel arrangements. The first seven SWALA recruits were sent to Egypt for training that year. These were Tobias Hainyeko, John Nankudhu, Vilho Haitembu, Titus Muailepeni Shitilifa, Patrick Israel Iyambo, Petrus Hambija and Lazarus Sakaria. They were also trained as company commanders so they could train and lead new recruits upon their return to Kongwa. Two years later, twelve recruits were sent to Ghana for six months of training. Other recruits were sent to Algeria, where they received eight months of basic instruction in small arms, explosives, laying land mines, radio communications, and political theory. SWALA personnel selected for more specialised instruction were sent to the Soviet Union. By 1965, there were also SWALA recruits undergoing training in North Korea and the People's Republic of China.

Most of the SWALA's support came from socialist nations. However, SWALA representatives also requested direct support from the United States and other Western states through their respective embassies in Dar es Salaam. During the 1940s, the US and South African governments had clashed over the latter's nettlesome attempts to annex South West Africa as a fifth province. The US had consistently voted against annexation proposals in the United Nations and even urged the International Court of Justice to deliver an advisory opinion opposed to South African territorial ambitions. Its postwar anti-colonial rhetoric made it a potentially important source of anti-colonial support, and for a time Washington was a major stop for nationalist leaders touring the world for benefactors. But when campaigning for official or private US aid, anti-colonial movements found that anti-communist credentials were valued above all others. SWAPO's Marxist style rhetoric and promises of ending foreign exploitation of South West Africa's resources did little to endear it to the US, which had significant investments in the territory. Additionally, the US government argued that change could only come if the colonial governments assented to a peaceful political transition, and therefore discouraged black Africans from seeking political rights through violence.

One consequence of this attitude was that SWALA followed most other African anti-colonial armies in becoming more definitively oriented towards the Soviet bloc and adopting forms of national liberation movement ideology. This radicalisation helped reinforce a wider shift to the left in Third World politics and made the Soviet Union the more credible of the superpowers in anti-colonial causes. For its part, the Soviet Union approved of SWAPO's decision to adopt guerrilla warfare because it was not optimistic about any solution to the South West African problem short of revolutionary struggle. It also possessed a marked antipathy towards the South African government, which Moscow viewed as a regional Western ally and a bastion of neocolonialism. There was a more practical segment to the Soviet relationship with SWALA: the Soviet government hoped that the cultivation of socialist client states on the African continent would deny their economic and strategic resources to the West. The training courses SWALA recruits underwent in the Soviet Union included extensive political instruction in Marxist theory.

In 1963, SWALA began receiving PPSh-41 submachine guns and TT pistols from Algeria and the Soviet Union. In September 1965, the first cadre of six SWALA guerrillas, identified simply as "Group 1", departed the Kongwa refugee camp to infiltrate South West Africa. SWALA's strategy at this point was to conduct passive reconnaissance and focus on the politicisation of the rural populace in Ovamboland as opposed to seeking out engagements with the South African security forces. Encouraged by South Africa's apparent failure to detect the initial incursion, larger cadres made their own infiltration attempts in February and March 1966. The second cadre, "Group 2", was led by Leonard Philemon Shuuya, also known by the nom de guerre "Castro" or "Leonard Nangolo". The insurgents travelled from Tanzania to Zambia, then crossed into the Caprivi Strip and set off on foot towards Ovamboland. The incursion in February was a failure, as the insurgents accidentally crossed into Angola and became involved with an altercation with two local shopkeepers there. Three were subsequently arrested by the Portuguese authorities in that country. Their capture alerted the South African government to SWALA's presence, and the South African Police (SAP) successfully intercepted the guerrillas involved in the March incursion in Kavangoland. SWAPO sources maintain that some of those captured by the police were later permitted to escape and make their way back to Kongwa, albeit as South African informants.

=== Early activities ===
In September 1965, SWALA established its first training camp on South West African soil, at Omugulugwombashe, one of five potential bases identified by SWALA's initial reconnaissance team as appropriate sites to recruit and drill more insurgents. At the time, SWALA numbered only about 250 personnel, most of whom were still undergoing training at Kongwa. The insurgents at Omugulugwombashe succeeded in recruiting only about 30 locals before the location of their camp was reported to the SAP. Three policemen discreetly visited the site on August 23, 1966, and confirmed that the insurgents were there. The SAP requested military assistance, and the South African Defence Force (SADF) was able to mobilise a small force of paratroops to attack the camp. Paramilitary officers of the SAP's Reaction Unit were also flown into South West Africa for the raid. The attack on Omugulugwombashe commenced on August 26, with the paratroops and policemen rappelling into the camp from eight SADF Aérospatiale Alouette III helicopters on loan to the SAP. The SWALA camp was destroyed and the insurgents suffered 2 dead, 1 seriously wounded, and 8 captured. This was the first engagement of what became known as the South African Border War.

The South African government subsequently arrested 37 of SWAPO's most prominent leaders and tried them, along with the captured SWALA insurgents, on charges of terrorism and armed insurrection. The defence counsel argued that because SWAPO did not recognise South Africa's administration of South West Africa as legitimate, its members could not be tried under South African laws by a South African court. The court rejected this opinion, and at least 20 of the detainees were given life sentences, while another 9 were given twenty year sentences.

Despite this setback, SWALA remained under pressure from the SWAPO leadership and pan-African strategists on the OAU Liberation Committee to establish "liberated zones" or "semi-liberated zones" in South West Africa. This strategy depended on the insurgents being able to seize and hold static positions, from which they could recruit more insurgents and receive supplies. However, SWALA remained stymied by its own over-extended logistics and geographic circumstances which made landing groups of armed partisans along the shoreline impossible. This forced the movement to continue sending cadres into South West Africa on long overland treks through Zambia, during which they had to cross through the Caprivi Strip, a region which was heavily monitored by the SAP for precisely this reason. From 1966 until the disintegration of Portuguese colonial rule in Angola during the mid-1970s, all of SWALA's infiltration attempts were made through the Caprivi Strip. The incursions were almost wholly unsuccessful.

The arrest of so much of SWAPO's internal leadership in mid 1966 effectively decapitated SWALA at the command level for months. It was not until December 1966 that the movement attempted to launch another major raid into South West Africa, this time further to the south near Grootfontein. The SAP began carrying its own search and destroy operations to locate the insurgents after they attacked a white farmer. Again, extensive SADF assistance was utilised, in the form of aircraft on loan and counter-insurgency advisers. The South African government was initially reluctant to view SWALA's activities as a military problem, reflecting a trend among Anglophone Commonwealth states to regard the police as the principal force in the suppression of insurgencies.

SWALA suffered a second major reversal on 18 May 1967, when its commander, Tobias Hainyeko, attempted to lead a reconnaissance team into the Caprivi as part of a general survey aimed at opening new lines of communication between the front lines in South West Africa and SWALA's headquarters in Dar es Salaam. Heinyeko was intercepted by an SAP patrol, which killed him after a brief firefight. The SAP later tracked and killed another 5 insurgents, with 4 managing to escape back into Zambia. After this catastrophe, SWALA considered abandoning the Zambian front and opening up a new infiltration route through Botswana. In December 1969, a group of insurgents were intercepted by the SAP shortly after crossing the Botswana border and 4 were killed.

== Organization ==
=== SWAPO Military Council ===
The SWAPO Military Council was the highest decision-making body of the People's Liberation Army of Namibia (PLAN). The council was constituted in 1977 and met once a year to review the political and military situation and the progress of the war. It drew up strategies for the operations conducted by PLAN during the liberation struggle. The Military Council was one of SWAPO's most solid branches during the liberation struggle. Its members were either regional commanders or political commissars while others were chosen by merit of their vast experience in the struggle. They were instrumental in creating the Operational Command Headquarters which was situated in Lumbango. The council was established under the leadership of Peter Nanyemba who served as the first SWAPO Secretary of Defence. Nanyemba was delegated by the President to chair the council for the first five years until he, as the Commander-in-Chief, and as per requirement of both SWAPO Constitution and PLAN manual took over.

=== Operational Command Headquarters ===
The Operational Command Headquarters was a highest level military command within PLAN consisting of the commander of PLAN and its deputy, PLAN chief political commissar, chief of staff, and all other departments within PLAN. SWAPO had developed structures to manage and control its armed wing, structurally, the Central Committee and the National Executive controlled the army.

The party president was also the Commander-in-Chief of PLAN and chairman of the SWAPO Military Council. Under the president, a deputy chief commander was also the commander of the army, being responsible for all PLAN operations and activities. Below the commander was the Secretary of Defence, who was in charge of logistical operations. He reported to and advised the National Executive. Military operations were organised by the commanders of the different regions, who were responsible for making recommendations to the Secretary of Defence.

==== Command structure ====
The command structure of PLAN consisted of:

- PLAN Commander: Dimo Hamaambo
- PLAN Deputy Commander: Solomon Hauala (a.k.a. "Jesus")
- PLAN Chief Political Commissar: Frans Kapofi
- PLAN Chief-of-Staff: Charles Ndaxu Namoloh (a.k.a."Ho Chi Minh")
- PLAN Chief of Operations: Martin Shalli
- PLAN Chief of Reconnaissance: Isaak Shikongo (a.k.a. "Pondo")
- PLAN Chief of Intelligence: James Auala
- PLAN Chief of Counter Intelligence: Israel Patrick Iyambo (a.k.a. "Lunganda")
- PLAN Chief of Artillery: Kristoph Kala
- PLAN Chief of Engineering: Nande Shafombambi
- PLAN Chief of Air Defence: Andrew Intamba (a.k.a. "Bongi")
- PLAN Chief of Logistics: Isaak Kapuleko
- PLAN Chief of Medical Health Services: Eloby Amundamba
- PLAN Chief of Communication: Augustus Nghaamwa (a.k.a. "McNamara")
- PLAN Chief of Personnel: Patrick Mwinga

=== Military regions ===
For administration purposes, the theater of operations was divided into four different military regions that were later called "fronts", with each front having its own Regional Commander, assisted by a Political Commissar and a Chief of Staff as part of the front's Command structure.

- Eastern Front
- North-Eastern Front
- Northern Front
- North-Western Front

The Eastern Front was the only military region located in Zambia while the North-Eastern, Northern and North-Western Fronts were located in Southern Angola.

==== Regional Commanders ====
- The Eastern Front Front had these fighters as its Commander;

Absai Hanghome as founding Commander who then was succeeded by Joseph Amunyela wa Shalali and later Ehrenfried "Baby" Jeombe.

- The North-Eastern Front Front had these fighters as its Commander;

Matias 'Mbulunganga' Ndakolo as founding Commander who then was succeeded by George "Chicken" Kaxuxwena, Ruben "Danger Ashipala" & Ehrenfried "Baby" Jeombe.

- The Northern Front had these fighters as its Commander;

Fillipus Nandenga "Zulu" as founding Commander who then was succeeded by Shilongo Elia, Nguluma Sheehama, Ehrenfried "Baby" Jeombe, Festus "Uudjuu wa Nangula" Hamukoto & Tomas "Mapaya" Shuuya.

- The Northern-Western Front had these fighters as its Commander;

Wilbardt "Nakada" Tashiya as founding Commander who then was succeeded by Uuno "Kanana" Shaanika & Erastus "Zicky" Negonga.

=== Strategy ===
The first incursions were staged from Zambia into the Caprivi strip by combatants in the early 1960s. PLAN incursions from Angola into Namibia restarted in earnest after the Portuguese withdrawal from Angola in 1975. Infiltration began particularly after the first rains during the rainy season when conditions were favourable for the combatants. Vegetation was tall and this provided for cover. The Oshanas were filled with drinking water that combatants needed during the long treks from their Angolan bases into Namibia. The rain also washed away any foot tracks, which rendered follow-up operations by South African forces difficult. Once in Namibia combatants either planted Landmines, sabotaged administration infrastructure i.e. electricity pylons, ambushed South African Defence Force (SADF) convoys, or attacked SADF bases from a stand-off distance by using mortars.

=== Facilities ===
PLAN operated numerous base-camps and support facilities, which were initially set up across Southern Zambia and later in Southern Angola. Its main guerrilla training camps were located inside Angola, the Tobias Hainyeko Training Centre (THTC) and the Jumbo Training Centre (JTC), both located around Lubango. Due to the nature of guerrilla warfare, the PLAN did not have permanent bases located closer to the Namibian–Angolan border as compared to a conventional army. In reality, base-camps were set up on a temporary basis as the security situation changed every time.

=== Units ===
PLANS organisational setup was in such a way that brigades and battalions were based in Angola responsible for rear defence as well as supporting FAPLA against UNITA and FNLA whilst the Detachments under the Fronts would be responsible for operation into occupied Namibia. The first Battalion formed by PLAN was the Moscow Battalion

- Moscow Battalion
- 1st Motorized Infantry Brigade
- Alpha Battalion
- Bravo Battalion
- 8th Battalion
- Salute Unit
- Volcano unit – this was a special commando force that was trained to infiltrate the Farming areas south of Oshivelo.

=== Weapons and equipment ===
Besides enjoying political support and sanctuary from Ghana, Tanzania, Kenya, Zambia and Angola, the PLAN received military assistance mainly from Egypt, Algeria, Cuba, the Soviet Union, Poland, East Germany, Czechoslovakia, Hungary, Yugoslavia, North Korea and the People's Republic of China, who provided weapons, ammunition, vehicles and other non-lethal military equipment, such as field radios and uniforms.

==== Small-arms ====
- Tokarev TT-33 pistol
- Makarov PM pistol
- CZ 75 pistol
- PPSh-41 submachine gun
- PPS wz. 1943/1952 submachine gun
- SKS semi-automatic rifle
- AK-47 assault rifle
- AKM assault rifle
- Type 56 assault rifle
- Vz. 52 rifle
- ZB vz. 26
- UK vz. 59
- RPK light machine gun
- RPD machine gun
- PK machine gun
- ZB-53 medium machine gun
- SG-43/SGM Goryunov medium machine gun
- DShkM 12.7mm Heavy machine gun
- M/52 sniper rifle
- Dragunov SVD-63 sniper rifle

==== Grenade systems ====
- F1 hand grenade
- RG-4 anti-personnel grenade
- RG-42 hand grenade
- RGD-5 hand grenade
- RPG-43 anti-tank grenade
- PGN-60 anti-tank rifle grenade
- M60 anti-personnel rifle grenade
- M60 anti-tank rifle grenade

==== Land mine systems ====
- OZM-4 anti-personnel mine
- PMD-6 anti-personnel mine
- PMN-1/2 anti-personnel mine
- POMZ-2/2M anti-personnel mine
- PP Mi-D anti-personnel mine
- PP Mi-BA anti-personnel mine
- PP Mi-SR anti-personnel mine
- PPM-2 anti-personnel mine
- PMA-1 anti-personnel mine
- PMA-2 anti-personnel mine
- PMA-3 anti-personnel mine
- PMR-1 anti-personnel mine
- PMR-2A anti-personnel mine
- PROM-1 anti-personnel mine
- PT Mi-Ba-II anti-tank mine
- PT Mi-Ba-III anti-tank mine
- PT-MI-K anti-tank mine
- TMA-2 anti-tank mine
- TMA-3 anti-tank mine
- TMA-4 anti-tank mine
- TMA-5 anti-tank mine
- TM-46 anti-tank mine
- TM-57 anti-tank mine
- TM-62B/M anti-tank mine
- TMD-44 anti-tank mine
- TMD-B anti-tank mine
- TMK-2 anti-tank mine
- UKA-63 anti-tank mine

==== Mortars ====
- M57 60mm mortar
- 82-BM-41 (M-1937) 82mm mortar

==== Anti-tank rocket and grenade launchers ====
- RPG-2
- RPG-7
- RPG-75

==== Anti-aircraft missiles ====
- SA-7 Grail surface-to-air missile

==== Armored vehicles ====
	Origin	Type	Acquired	In service	Notes
T-34/85	USSR	Medium Tank	10	1984–1990	SWAPO T-34s were never deployed during offensive operations against the South African military, being confined to the role of protecting strategic bases inside northern Angola.
BTR-60	Soviet Union	Armoured Personnel Carrier	10		
BTR-152	Soviet Union	Armoured Personnel Carrier	6		
BRDM-2	Soviet Union	Scout Car	12		

==== Rocket systems and towed artillery ====
	Origin	Type	Acquired	In service	Notes
BM-21 Grad	Soviet Union	Multiple Rocket Launcher	5		
ZIS-2	Soviet Union	Anti-tank Gun	6		
ZIS-3	Soviet Union	Anti-tank Gun	12		
ZPU-1	Soviet Union	Anti-aircraft Autocannon			
ZPU-4	Soviet Union	Anti-aircraft Autocannon			
ZU-23-2	Soviet Union	Anti-aircraft Autocannon	15		
61-K	Soviet Union	Anti-aircraft Gun			

== Notable former combatants ==
- Commissioner (rtd) Danger Ashipala
- Tobias Hainyeko
- Lt Gen (rtd) Dimo Hamaambo
- Hidipo Hamutenya
- Fillipus Nandenga (a.k.a. "Commander Zulu")
- Lt Gen (rtd) Solomon Huwala (a.k.a. "Jesus")
- Jesaya Elago Kambonde
- Richard Kamwi
- Julius Shaambeni Shilongo Mnyika (with PLAN's forerunner, South West African Liberation Army)
- Philemon Moongo
- Peter Mweshihange
- Peter Naholo
- Maj Gen (rtd) Peter Nambundunga (a.k.a. "Cosmos")
- Charles Ndaxu Namoloh (a.k.a. "Ho Chi Minh")
- Peter Nanyemba (a.k.a. "Ndlimani")
- Monica Nashandi
- Sakaria Nashandi
- John Pandeni
- Lt Gen (rtd) Martin Shalli
- Helao Shityuwete
- Eliaser Tuhadeleni
- Ben Ulenga
- Brig Gen (rtd) Erasmus Amupolo
- Maj Gen (rtd) Ben Kadhila
- Lt Gen (rtd) John Mutwa
- Erastus Kashopola
- Maj Gen (rtd) Matheus Alueendo
- Brig Gen (rtd) Fiina Amupolo
- Brig Gen (rtd) Joseph Kakoto
- Jesaya Elago Kambonde
- Lt Gen (rtd) Epaphras Denga Ndaitwah
- Rear Adm (rtd) Sinsy Nghipandua
- Martin Pinehas
- Maj Gen (rtd) Nestor Shali Shalauda
- Maj Gen (rtd) Tomas Hamunyela
- Wilbard Shikongo
- Rear Adm (rtd) Peter Vilho
- Brig Gen (rtd) Bernard Nkawa
- Brig Gen (rtd) Holden Uulenga
- Peter Tsheehama
- Niilo Taapopi
- Victor Simunja
- Simeon Kambo Shixungileni
- Col (rtd) Lawrence Sampofu
- Capt (N) Phestus Sacharia
- Maj Gen Aktofel Nambahu
- Philemon Malima
- Maj Gen (rtd) Ben Kadhila
- Joel Kaapanda
- Patrick Iyambo (a.k.a "Lunganda")
- Maj Gen (rtd) Tomas Hamunyela
- Brig (rtd) James Auala
- Rear Adm (rtd) Alweendo Amungulu
- Maj Gen (rtd) Matheus Alueendo
- Matias Ndakolo (a.k.a. "Mbulunganga")
- Col (rtd) George Kaxuxuena

== See also ==
- People's Armed Forces of Liberation of Angola (FAPLA), the military wing of the MPLA.
- uMkhonto weSizwe (MK), the military wing of the African National Congress (ANC).
- South West Africa Territorial Force (SWATF), the military and security arm of the former South African administration.
- Namibian Defence Force (NDF), the current national military of Namibia.
