= Fiina Amupolo =

Namibian military officer (born c. 1960)

Fiina Fenni Amupolo
- Born: c. 1960's Namibia
- Military career
- Allegiance: Namibia
- Branch: Namibian Army
- Service years: 1990-
- Rank: Brigadier General
- Commands: Defence Inspector General; Commander Composite Depot

Brigadier General Fiina Fenni Amupolo is a Namibian military officer who is serving as the Defence Inspector General of the Namibian Defence Force (NDF).

== Career ==
Amupolo went into exile and joined the Peoples Liberation Army of Namibia and served in various capacities. In 1990 she was a pioneer of the Namibian Defence Force was appointed as a chief administration clerk at Defence Headquarters with the rank of Warrant officer Class two. In 1997 she was promoted to the rank of captain. In 1999 she was transferred to the Military School Okahandja for recruit training and appointed as Bravo Company Commander, whilst in 2000 she was transferred back to Defence Headquarters as a staff officer class 3. She was then promoted to major and appointed as second in command of Logistics Support Battalion in the Namibian Army. In 2004 she was then promoted to lieutenant colonel and appointed as a staff officer class one at Logistics Directorate. In 2010 was transferred to the Composite Depot and appointed as commanding officer succeeding Lieutenant Colonel David Amutenya. She was then promoted to colonel and appointed as Defence Attaché to Germany, a posting she held until January 2019 when she was promoted to general officer and appointed as Defence Inspector General.

== Honours and decorations ==
- Most Distinguished Order of Namibia: Third Class
- NDF Twenty year service Medal

Military offices
Unknown	Inspector General Defence Inspectorate; 2019–	Incumbent
Preceded by Brig Gen Karel Ndjoba	Defence Attaché Germany; 2014–2019	Unknown
Preceded by Lt Col David Amutenya	Commanding Officer Composite Depot; 2010–2014	Succeeded by Lt Col Martha Naxueka
