= Dumeni Solomon Hawala =

Namibian military officer (1935 or 1936 – 2025)

- Born: 19 August 1935; South West Africa
- Died: 11 August 2025 (aged 89)
- Military career
- Allegiance: Namibia
- Branch: People's Liberation Army of Namibia; Namibian Army
- Rank: Lieutenant General
- Conflicts: Namibian War of Independence: Battle of Singalamwe; Battle of Kwando Camp; Attack of Katima Mulilo Base

Head of the Namibian Defence Force
- In office 2000 – October 2006

Army Commander of the Namibian Defence Force
- In office 1990–2000
- Preceded by: Dimo Hamaambo
- Succeeded by: Martin Shalli

Angula Dumeni Solomon "Jesus" Hawala (19 August 1935 – 11 August 2025) was a Namibian Army lieutenant general. Hawala was the deputy commander of the People's Liberation Army of Namibia before independence. He earned the nickname "Butcher of Lubango" for allegedly running detainee camps of SWAPO opponents in the southern Angolan city of Lubango during the Namibian War of Independence. Upon independence in 1990, Hawala was appointed Army Commander in the Namibian Defence Force (NDF). In 2000 he replaced Dimo Hamaambo as head of the NDF. He retired in October 2006 and was replaced by Martin Shalli.

== Early life ==
Hawala was born to Dumeni Matheus Hawala and Monica Kaapanda at the Efidi lOmulunga village near Ongwediva in today's Oshana Region on 19 August 1935 in the then Northern Ovamboland, South West Africa. In 1940 their homestead moved from Efidi lOmulunga Village to Ohakweenyanga village when his father gained work there. He was educated at the Lutheran Mission at Ongwediva and attended school until Standard Four.

== Career ==
In 1955 he took up employment with a company named Chameleon. In the following year, 1956, he signed up with the South West Africa Native Labour Association (SWANLA) at Ondjondjo in Ondangwa, they were then transported from Ondangwa to Grootfontein, after which to different labour distribution points of the contract labour system via rail. He was posted to Okahandja where he worked at a local hotel as general worker for 18 months after which he returned to Ovamboland at the end of the contract in 1958. SWANLA would later place him as a clerk responsible for book and storekeeping at Pupkewitz in Walvis Bay until 1962 when the contract ended before returning to Ovamboland again.

Towards the end of 1962 he travelled to Windhoek and landed another job at a local hotel in a housekeeping role for a period of 12 months. Between 1963 and 1964 he landed a job on the road construction project of the Oshakati-Ondangwa road.

=== Exile ===
Whilst working under the contract labour system, he attended SWAPO meetings in Walvis Bay. In 1964 together with Alfeus Veshitile of Ohalushu, Peter Shitongeni decided to join SWAPO in exile. They traveled from Ohalushu village, Omundaungilo, Omboloka, until Nkurenkuru. From there they travelled by a Witwatersrand Native Labour Association (WENELA) truck to Shakawe in the then Bechuanaland. From Shakawe, WENELA flew them to Francistown, where they met Maxton Josef Mutongolume. Mutongolume took them in for seven months and facilitated their travels to Northern Rhodesia where they arrived two days after Zambia's independence in October 1964. SWAPO's chief representative in Zambia Hifikepunye Pohamba organized their travel to Mbeya, Tanzania. Peter Nanyemba, Tobias Hainyeko and others received them in Mbeya. In 1971 he was elected to SWAPO's Central Committee and in 1981 to SWAPO's Politburo, both positions he held until 1989.

=== PLAN ===
Hawala underwent Basic Military Training at Kongwa. Training included Political Education, Skill at Arms, Guerilla Warfare tactics, Communication, Reconnaissance etc. In December 1966 he was sent with ten other cadres to North Korea for further training that lasted for one year.

Upon his return he was assigned to the office of the Chief representative of SWAPO in Lusaka, Zambia, as assistant to Salomon Mifima until 1971. After which he was made Chief Administrator at SWAPO Head Office. He was then deployed to Sinanga in 1974 after the Caetano revolution to relieve Commander Amutenya wa Ndadi who was the most senior commander at the front. In 1975 Peter Nanyemba appointed three Assistant Commanders of PLAN to deputise Commander Dimo Hamaambo, Jonas Haiduwa, Solomon Hawala and Patrick "Lunganda" Iyambo. Commander Haiduwa was deployed to Angola, Commander's Lunganda and Hawala remained in Zambia to Command the Eastern Region from Zambia. He organized numerous battles on the eastern front including the attack on South African Defence Force Base Katima Mulilo Base in August 1978, Battle of Singalamwe in February 1978, Battle of Kwando Camp in February 1978. After the convening of the PLAN Military Council meeting in 1979, the posts of three Assistant Commanders of PLAN where abolished and one position of Deputy Commander of PLAN was created with Hawala being appointed as Deputy Commander of PLAN a position he held until 1989. Having been appointed deputy Commander of PLAN he left Zambia for Angola and handed over command of the Eastern front to Commander Ehrenfried "Baby" Jeombe. In 1981 he was sent to the Soviet Union. He was sent for training on Military Combat Work and Special Security Services that included Counter Intelligence, Information collection and Analysis, etc. Upon return in 1982 he was appointed as head of SWAPO's General Security Service whilst remaining as Deputy Commander of PLAN. The Service had the mandate to locate apartheid South Africa Spies that had infiltrated the Liberation Movement. This mandate led to numerous severe human rights violations as innocent people accused of being spies were detained, tortured and killed by PLAN-members.

=== Namibian Defence Force ===
On Namibia's independence on 21 March 1990, Hawala was inducted into the Namibian Defence Force with the rank of Major General and appointed as the first commander of the Namibian Army, in this position he oversaw the integration of the two former warring opponents, Peoples Liberation Army of Namibia combatants and Former members of South West Africa Territorial Force into the Namibian Army. During his term as Army Commander the Namibian Defence Force participated in numerous United Nations Missions such as:

- UNAMIC in Cambodia
- United Nations Angola Verification Mission III (UNAVEM III) in Angola
- MONUA in Angola

Under his command, the Army also decisively quelled the Caprivi Insurrection in August 1999. In 1998 the Army deployed troops to DRC in the Second Congo War as part of SADC Allied Forces. In December 2000 following the retirement of Lieutenant General Dimo Hamaambo, Hawala was promoted to the rank of Lieutenant General and appointed as Chief of the Namibian Defence Force, a role he served in until 2006. Notable developments during his tenure as Chief of the Defence Force include the commissioning of the NDF Maritime Wing into the Namibian Navy in 2004 and the commissioning of the NDF Air Wing into the Namibian Air Force.

=== Post-retirement ===
After retirement Hawala lived at Ohakweenyanga in the Oshana Region. He died on 11 August 2025, at the age of 89. He was buried the old Ongwediva Lutheran Cemetery with full National Honors on 6 September 2025.

== Honours and decorations ==
- Order of Eagle 1st Class
- Army Pioneer Medal
- Army Ten Years Service Medal
- Namibian Cross for bravery (Silver) Medal
- Omungulugombashe Medal

Military offices
Preceded by Dimo Hamaambo	Chief of Defence Force; 2000–2006	Succeeded by Martin Shalli
Preceded by Vacant	Commander Namibian Army; 1990–2000	Succeeded by Martin Shalli
