= Lawrence Sampofu =

Namibian soldier and politician

Lawrence Alufea Sampofu (born 10 August 1955) is a Namibian soldier and politician. He was the governor of Zambezi Region from 2010 to 2025.

Sampofu was born on 10 August 1955 in Mbabanzi in the Zambezi Region. During Namibia's struggle for independence he joined the People's Liberation Army of Namibia (PLAN), the military wing of SWAPO. He received training in Zambia and Tanzania and was involved in several PLAN battles. After independence he was Head of Military Operations of the Zambezi Region and later Senior Operations Officer. During his military career, Sampofu rose to the rank of colonel in the Namibian Defence Force. He also served on the MINURCAT and UNMEE United Nations peace keeping missions in Central Africa.
