= Namibian Special Forces =

- Country: Namibia
- Allegiance: Constitution of Namibia
- Type: Unified special operations combatant command
- Size: Classified
- Part of: Namibian Defence Force
- Garrison/HQ: Windhoek, Khomas, Namibia
- Colors: Maroon; Yellow

Commanders
- Commander of Special Forces: Colonel

The Namibian Special Forces is a special operations command of the Namibian Defence Force responsible for the special operations forces component.

The Army Commando specializes in air assault and airborne operations, the capture or killing of high-value targets, counterterrorism, direct action, hostage rescue, insertion behind enemy lines, executive protection, and special warfare operations.

The units receive training assistance from former South African Special Forces (Recces) and other friendly nations i.e. Russia and China. The units regularly participate in Southern African Development Community (SADC) special forces exercises.

== Role ==
The roles vary according to the unit. The Parachute Battalion's role is to be dropped onto an objective via static line parachuting. The Pathfinder unit is a special reconnaissance unit of the Parachute Battalion, its role is to deploy small units to search a potential land zone and set it up before the larger parachute unit is dropped there, making them the eyes and ears of the parachute unit.

The Army Commando unit is the principal counterinsurgency, counterterrorism, hostage rescue, and special warfare operations whose primary role is direct action, combat search and rescue, counterterrorism, hostage rescue, long-range penetration, and special reconnaissance by inserting using unconventional parachute techniques to achieve an objective.

The special operations roles include but not limited to:

- Capture or kill high-value targets
- Clandestine operations.
- Combat search and rescue.
- Counterintelligence.
- Covert operations.
- Defusing and disposal of bombs, land mines, and unexploded ordnance.
- Executive protection.
- Forward air control.
- Frontline military intelligence gathering.
- HUMINT.
- Irregular warfare.
- Maritime interdiction.
- Maritime search and rescue.
- Peacekeeping with international.
- Providing security in areas at risk of sabotage or terrorism.
- Psychological warfare.
- Unconventional warfare.

== Units ==
=== Special Forces School ===
The school is responsible training the members of the Special Forces Formation.

=== Airborne force ===
A Paratrooper Unit Consisting of at least 3 rifle Companies, support company, a Pathfinder Sub-unit and Headquarters element.

=== Commando ===
A Commando Regiment is gradually expanding its capability to include a maritime capability.

== Training ==
=== Paratroopers ===
Pre-Selection phase is 6 weeks long during which candidates are tested on military skills, such as Musketry Training, Navigation, Field Craft. After going through the pre selection phase the candidates progress to the Parachute Selection Phase. Both phases are physically and mentally tough. The pass rate for both phases is only 30 percent. The candidates then progress to the Basic Static Line Jump Course which consists of a 1-week ground phase and 3 weeks of Practical Parachute Jumping. Included in this is 9 Parachute Jumps which of which 5 are Clean Fatigue jumps with Combat Webbing and Weapon jump, a Personal Weapons Container (PWC) jump and a Night jump. After completing this the candidate is officially a paratrooper and is awarded the Parachute jump wings and the maroon beret. Training takes place at the Namibia Special Forces School at the Grootfontein Air Base.

The training cycle continues for paratroopers and undergo further courses depending on their roles and ranks. Paratrooper Officers in the course of their careers undertake courses like the Airborne Battle Handling course and the Paratrooper Company Commanders And Second-In-Command Courses. Senior Non Commissioned officer's undertake courses like the Paratrooper Company Warrant Officer's/Quartermasters Course which includes aspects like how to build a field base and Battlefield replenishment are taught.

=== Pathfinders ===
Pathfinders are taken from existing Paratroopers. A Pathfinder student should be Basic Static Line Parachuting and Basic Free Fall Parachuting qualified. The Pathfinder course is 8 weeks long Pathfinder Selection covers Bush Craft, Tracking and Survival, Escape and Evasion, Minor Tactics, Basic Photography, Basic Signals, DZSO (Drop Zone Safety Officer), Helicopter and Fixed Wing Landing Zones.

=== Commandos ===
The Commando operators basic course is 9 months long. Training takes place at the Special Forces School in Grootfontein. To qualify for the Commando operators Course the student should already be a qualified paratrooper having completed the Basic Static Line Parachute Jump Course. The Commando operators course covers Pre-Selection and Selection, Bush Craft, Tracking and SERE, Minor Tactics, Kayak Handling, Basic Photography, Basic Signals, Basic Desert and Urban, Basic Demolitions. Friendly countries including South Africa and Russia also accept candidates into their basic training cycles. After passing the operators course the student is then awarded the Special Forces Dagger.

The advanced training cycle then starts for the operator for another 36 months in order to become a fully qualified Commando specialist. The specialist training cycle covers Advanced Signals, Small Boats (Kayaks), Combat Photography, Sharp Shooter, Advanced Demolitions, Advanced Urban, Combat Swimming, Scuba Diving, Attack Diving, Commando Team Leaders, Fast-roping and Rappelling, Basic Mountaineering and Advanced 4x4 Driver Skills.

== Equipment ==
=== Known weapons ===
==== Rifles ====
Name	Photo	Type	Calibre	Origin
AK-47		Assault rifle	7.62×39mm	Soviet Union
AK-105		Assault rifle	5.45×39mm	Russia
AK-103		Assault rifle	7.62×39mm	Russia
Norinco CQ-A		Assault rifle	5.56×45mm	China

==== Submachine guns ====
Name	Photo	Type	Calibre	Origin
Vityaz-SN		Submachine gun	9×19mm	Russia
FAMAE SAF		Submachine gun	9×19mm	Chile

==== Machine-guns ====
Name	Photo	Type	Calibre	Origin
PKP Pecheneg		Machine gun	7.62×54mm	Russia
RPK		Machine gun	7.62×39mm	Soviet Union
PKM		Machine gun	7.62×54mm	Soviet Union
Kord machine gun		Machine gun	12.7×108mm	Russia

==== Grenades and grenade launchers ====
Name	Photo	Type	Calibre	Origin
AGS-30		Grenade launcher	30 mm	Russia
GP-34		Grenade launcher	40 mm	Soviet Union

==== Anti-tank weapons ====
Name	Photo	Type	Origin
RPG-7		Grenade launcher	Soviet Union

==== Sniper rifle ====
Name	Photo	Type	Origin
Blaser R93 Tactical		Rifle	Germany

=== Known vehicles ===
	Origin	Type	Acquired	In service	Notes
Agrale Marruá	Brazil	Utility Vehicle	141	--	141 units acquired for the whole Defence; Force, total units used by Special Forces is classified.

== Commanders ==
Namibian Special Forces
From	Commandant	To	Ribbon
2018	Col John Shimwetheleni	2024	
Unknown	Col Martin Shikomba	2018	
Unknown	Col Ben Kadhila (Note: Later Major General)	Unknown	
