= Danger Ashipala =

Namibian military officer (1947–2010)

Ruben Michael Ningilanayi "Danger" Ashipala (26 August 1947 – 9 May 2010) was a Namibian police officer, military commander and military officer. Ashipala was also a guerrilla fighter and high-profile commander of the People's Liberation Army of Namibia.

== Namibian War of Independence ==
Born in Omaandi, Ovamboland (now the Omusati Region, Namibia), Ashipala was a military commander in the 1970s and 1980s with the People's Liberation Army of Namibia, the armed wing of SWAPO during the Namibian War of Independence. He earned notoriety for capturing South African soldier, Johan van der Mescht, in an operation in Namibia in 1978. It was widely believed in South Africa that Van der Mescht had deserted; after four years in prison in Luanda, he was eventually exchanged at Checkpoint Charlie in 1982 for Russian spy Alexey Kozlov.

== Later life ==
Following independence in 1989, Ashipala became a commander in the non-racial Namibian Defence Force before eventually becoming an advisor to the inspector general of the Police Sebastian Ndeitunga. He retired in 2007. Ashipala died in his sleep on 9 May 2010 in his home in Windhoek's Academia suburb at the age of 62. He was buried in his native Omusati Region next to his mother. A number of prominent national politicians attended his funeral, including President Sam Nujoma, Prime Minister Nahas Angula as well as cabinet ministers Nangolo Mbumba and Abraham Iyambo. In Swakopmund, a street was named after him.

== In popular culture ==
The Full Circle Productions-produced film Captor and Captive, described by the local Villager newspaper as "a story of forgiveness and redemption", documents Ashipala's reunion with van der Mescht after the latter's return to Namibia in 2009. It was broadcast by the South African Broadcasting Corporation (SABC) in 2011.
