= Chief of the Defence Force (Namibia) =

Head of the Namibian army

Chief of the Namibian Defence Force
- Flag of the Namibian Defence Force
- Incumbent; Air Marshal Martin Pinehas since 1 April 2020
- Ministry of Defence
- Reports to: Minister of Defence
- Appointer: President of Namibia
- Constituting instrument: Defence Act of 2002
- Precursor: Commander of the SWATF
- Formation: 1990
- First holder: Dimo Hamaambo
- Website: Official website

The Chief of the Defence Force (CDF) is the professional head of the Namibian Defence Force. He is responsible for the administration and the operational control of the Namibian military. The position was established after Namibia became independent in 1990. The current chief is Air Marshal Martin Pinehas, he succeeded Lieutenant general John Mutwa.

== List of chiefs ==
No.	Picture	Chief of the Defence Force	Took office	Left office	Time in office	Ref.
1	Dimo Hamaambo	Lieutenant general Dimo Hamaambo (1932–2002)	March 1990	November 2000	10 years, 7 months	
2	Solomon Huwala	Lieutenant general Solomon Huwala (1936–2025)	November 2000	October 2006	5 years, 11 months	
3	Martin Shalli	Lieutenant general Martin Shalli (born 1954)	October 2006	July 2009	2 years, 9 months	
–	Peter Nambundunga	Major general Peter Nambundunga (1947–2019); Acting	July 2009	January 2011	1 year, 7 months	
4	Epaphras Denga Ndaitwah	Lieutenant general Epaphras Denga Ndaitwah (born 1952)	January 2011	31 December 2013	2 years, 11 months	
5	John Mutwa	Lieutenant general John Mutwa (1960–2021)	31 December 2013	31 March 2020	6 years, 3 months	
6	Martin Pinehas	Air Marshal; Martin Pinehas (born 1962)	1 April 2020	Incumbent	6 years, 5 months	
