= Ndaitwah =

Ndaitwah is a surname. Notable people with the surname include:

- Epaphras Denga Ndaitwah (born 1952), Namibian diplomat and military commander
- Netumbo Nandi-Ndaitwah (born 1952), Namibian politician and government minister, wife of Epaphras Denga Ndaitwah
