= Defence Logistics Directorate (Namibia) =

Branch of the Namibian Defence Force

- Country: Namibia
- Part of: Namibia Defence Force

The Defence Logistics Directorate is the branch of the Namibian Defence Force responsible for materiel supplies.

== History ==
The directorate was formed in 1990 at the creation of the Defence Force. The inaugural Director for Logistics was Colonel Peter Nambundunga. The directorate is also responsible for preparing logistics plans, policies and their implementation. It is also responsible for implementing the transport policy. It controls and archives the acquisitions of new materiel and equipment. In 1997 the directorate was composed of four divisions, namely:

- Technical Services
- Logistic Acquisitions and Defence Estates
- Operations, Planning & Training
- Supply Commodity management

== Units ==
The unit falling under the Logistics Directorate is the:

- Composite Depot

== Leadership ==
Defence Logistics Directorate
| From | Chief of Staff | To | Ribbon |
|---|---|---|---|
| 2019 | Air Commodore Fillemon Sisco Iitembu | 2021 | |
| 1 July 2017 | Brigadier General David Amutenya | 2019 | |
| 1 March 2011 | Brigadier General Joseph Kakoto | Unknown date | |
| 2006 | Brig John Mutwa (Note: Later Lieutenant General) | 2011 | |
| 1995 | Brig James Auala | 2005 | |
| 1990 | Col Peter Nambundunga (Note: Later Major General) | 1996 | |
