= Amutenya =

Amutenya is a surname. Notable people with the surname include:

- Helena Amutenya, Namibian military officer
- Kennedy Amutenya (born 1995), Namibian footballer
