= Joseph Kakoto =

Namibian military officer

Joseph Hatutale Kakoto
- Born: c.1958 Namibia
- Military career
- Allegiance: Namibia
- Branch: Namibian Army
- Service years: 1974-2018
- Rank: Brigadier General
- Commands: GOC 4 arty Brigade Chief of Staff Logistics Commandant Military School

Brigadier General Joseph Hatutale Kakoto is a retired Namibian military officer who served as General Officer Commanding of the 4 Artillery Brigade. He retired on retired in January 2018.

== Career ==
Brigadier General Kakoto went into exile joined the Peoples Liberation Army of Namibia in 1974 and served in various capacities. In 1990 he was a pioneer of the Namibian Defence Force. Rising through the ranks in the 2010s he was appointed as commandant of the Military School and in 2011 he was appointed as Chief of Staff Logistics at Defence Headquarters. After which he was transferred back to the Army and appointed as General Officer Commanding 4 artillery Brigade, he served in that capacity until his retirement in January 2018. He holds a Ph.D. in Business Administration from the Atlantic International University, United States.

== Honours and decorations ==
- Namibian Army Pioneer Medal
- NDF Campaign Medal
- NDF Commendation Medal

Military offices
| Preceded by Brigadier General Nestor Shali Shalauda | General Officer Commanding 4 Artillery Brigade; 2015-2018 | Succeeded by Brigadier General Ambrosius Kwedhi |
| Preceded by Brigadier General John Mutwa | Chief of Staff Defence Logistics; 2011-2015 | Succeeded by Brigadier General David Amutenya |
| Unknown | Commandant Military School Okahandja unknown date-2011 | Succeeded by Brigadier General Fredrick Siluzungila |
