= 26 Motorised Infantry Brigade (Namibia) =

- Country: Namibia
- Type: Motorised Infantry
- Size: Brigade
- Part of: Namibian Army
- Garrison/HQ: Grootfontein, Otjozondjupa
- Colors: Blue, Yellow, Green

Commanders
- General Officer Commanding: Brigadier General Paulus Iipinge

26 Motorised Infantry Brigade (pronounced as Two Six Motorised Infantry Brigade) is a brigade of the Namibian Army based at Grootfontein. The prefix "26" is taken from 26 August 1966, the day on which SWAPO guerrillas first encountered the South African security forces at Ongulumbashe. The brigade is responsible for defence of the Northern areas of Namibia. Its subordinate units are situated in Zambezi, Kavango, Omusati, Kunene and Oshana regions.

== Equipment ==
The Brigade uses the following equipment:

- Toyota Land Cruiser
- Toyota Hilux
- Ural Trucks

== Units ==
The standard Namibian Infantry Brigade consists of a brigade Headquarters, a transport company, logistics company and a medical company supporting three Infantry battalions an artillery regiment and an air defence regiment.

- 261 Battalion (pronounced as Two Six One Motorised Infantry Battalion) (Rundu)
- 262 Battalion (pronounced as Two Six Two Motorised Infantry Battalion) (Katima Mulilo)
- 263 Battalion (pronounced as Two Six Three Motorised Infantry Battalion)(Oshakati)

== Leadership ==
26 Motorised Infantry Brigade
From	General Officer Commanding	To	Ribbon
Unknown date	Brigadier General Tomas Hamunyela (Note: Later Major General)	unknown date	
2008	Brigadier General Erasmus Amupolo	4 April 2014	
25 July 2019	Brigadier General Holden Uulenga	unknown date	
Unknown date	Brigadier General Peter Shikolalye	29 March 2016	
29 March 2016	Brigadier General Ernos Hakuna	01 March 2018	
1 March 2018	Brigadier General Epimacus Tshavuka	28 May 2019	
28 May 2019	Brigadier General Willem Shigwedha	Unknown date	
Unknown date	Brigadier General Josua Kayofa	1 April 2023	
1 April 2023	Brigadier General Paulus Iipinge	incumbent	
From	Formation Sergeant Major	To	Ribbon
1998	WO1 Albert Siyaya	2003	
