= Joint Operations Directorate (Namibia) =

Joint Operations, Plans and Training Directorate
- Country: Namibia
- Part of: Namibian Defence Force

Commanders
- Chief of Staff: Major General Joshua Namhindo

The Joint Operations, Plans and Training Directorate is the branch of the Namibian Defence Force responsible for the force employment.

== History ==
The directorate was formed in 1990 at the inception of the Defence Force and was known as the Directorate Policy and Operations. The inaugural Director for Operations was Brigadier General Martin Shalli.The Directorate was later renamed to Operations, Plans and Training. The directorate is responsible for developing and archiving and revising plans, doctrines for the force. The directorate was renamed to Joint Operations inline with the increased combined nature of the Force. The rank of the Chief of Staff was increased from Brigadier to Major General.

== Organisation ==
The directorate is divided into the Operations, Plans, and Training Divisions. Divisions are led by Senior Staff Officers with the rank of colonel or its Air Force and Navy equivalents.

== Leadership ==
Joint Operations Directorate
From	Chief of Staff	To	Ribbon
1 September 2019	Maj Joshua Namhindo	Incumbent	
July 2018	Brigadier General Leonard Nghiishongele	1 September 2019	
Unknown date	Maj Ben Kadhila (Note: Later Major General)	July 2018	
March 2011	Maj Charles Shalumbu	unknown date	
2008	Maj Epaphras Denga Ndaitwah (Note: Later Lieutenant General)	March 2011	
1990	Brigadier General Martin Shalli	1995	
