= Bernard Nkawa =

Namibian military officer (1958–2020)

- Born: 15 February 1958; Mahundu Namibia (then South-West Africa, South Africa)
- Died: November 26, 2020 (aged 62); Namibia
- Military career
- Allegiance: Namibia
- Branch: PLAN; Namibian Army
- Service years: 1975-2018
- Rank: Brigadier General
- Commands: 12 Mot Inf Bde (2010-2014); DA: DRC
- Awards

Brigadier General Bernard Nkawa was a Namibian military officer whose last appointment was as Defence Attaché to DRC.

== Career ==
=== PLAN career ===
Nkawa's military career began in Peoples Liberation Army of Namibia, the military wing of SWAPO in 1975 and received military training at Oshatotwa in the Western Province of Zambia. He was then deployed to PLAN's Eastern Front covering Zambia and the Zambezi region. From 1977 to 1979 he attended a Battalion Commander course in the USSR. Upon completion of his studies he returned to Zambia and then transferred to Angola, as 2nd Brigade training commander at Tobias Hainyeko Training Center from 1980 to 1982. Then afterwards he was appointed chief instructor for Namibian instructors delegated to train special units of FAPLA in guerrilla tactics from 1982 to 1983. He was then appointed Chief of Staff Rhino Battalion at the north western front in Techipa in 1985. Between 1988 and 1989 he attended the Infantry Brigade commander course in Yugoslavia. He was then repatriated back to Namibia under the UNTAG process.

=== NDF career ===
Nkawa was inducted into the Namibian Defence Force as a pioneer with the rank of major at Namibian Independence. He was then appointed 261 Battalion second in command(2IC) between 1990 and 1994. He was then transferred to 124 Battalion as a second in command between 1994 and 1998. Between 1996 and 1997 he was deployed to UNAVEM III in Angola as deputy contingent commander. He was then promoted to lieutenant colonel and appointed Commanding Officer from 1998 to 2001, during this period he was deployed to the DRC under Operation Atlantic (Democratic Republic of Congo) in the Second Congo War between 1998 and 1999 as a battle group commander in the eastern front. He participated in anti UNITA operations in the Kavango region and southern Angola known as Operation Mandume from 2000 to 2002 as the Battalion commander. He was then appointed 26 Motorised Infantry Brigade Commander from 2001 to 2008. Between 2008 and 2010 he was the Commandant of the Oshivelo Army Battle School. 12 Motorised Infantry Brigade was his next command between 2010 and 2014 as General officer Commanding. He was then appointed to the DRC as a Defence Attache between 2014 and 2018. He retired in 2018 and died in a motor vehicle accident in the Zambezi Region in November 2020.

=== Qualifications ===
- Senior Staff Course and masters in Military science, 1993-94-India
- Advance Military law 1996
- Defence Management-2000
- Executive Course in Defence Management 2001
- International Senior officers Peace Support Operations Planner 2004
- Executive course in Security Section governance, 2005
- 2007 National Defence College- Kenya

== Honours and decorations ==
- Grand Commander of the Most distinguished order of Namibia 2nd class
- Namibian Army Pioneer Medal
- Army Ten Years Medal
- NDF Ten Years Medal
- Army Twenty Years Service Medal
- UNAVEM Medal
- NDF Campaign Medal
- Mandume Ya Ndemufayo Operation Medal

Military offices
Unknown	General Officer Commanding 12 Motorised Infantry Brigade; 2010-2014	Succeeded by Brigadier General Peter Ngilukilwa
