= School of Military Science (Namibia) =

- Affiliations: University of Namibia; Namibian Defence Force
- Dean: Dr. Richard Iroanya
- Undergraduates: Bachelor of Military Science (Honours) in: Aeronautical, Army, Nautical- Electronics, Nautical- Mechanical, Nautical- Weapon Systems
- Postgraduates: Master of Arts in Security and Strategic Studies (MA-SSS)
- Location: Windhoek, Namibia
- Campus: Windhoek
- Website: http://www.unam.edu.na/faculty-of-science/military-science/

The School of Military Science is an academic unit of the Namibian Defence Force. As per international norm the School is a military unit of the Namibian Defence Force (NDF) and is co-located at the School of Military Science of the University of Namibia.

It is an academic unit of the Namibian military and offers a variety of training ranging from undergraduate as well as postgraduate academic qualification. It provides officers from the branches-of-service an opportunity to earn a military science-oriented academic qualification.

== History ==
In 2012, it was announced that the Ministry of Defence and the UNAM agreed to twin up and come up with a degree level military science curriculum to provide cadet officers with a degree level qualification.

== Location ==
The school is located at the University of Namibia main campus in Windhoek.

== Qualifications ==
- Undergraduate offerings
  - Bachelor of Military Science (Honours)

As of 2013, the University of Namibia and the military school jointly began offering the undergraduate Bachelor of Military Science (Honours) degree with three specialization areas, Aeronautical, Army and Nautical. The Nautical specialization is sub-divided into an additional three fields: Nautical-Electronics, Nautical-Mechanical and Nautical-Weapon Systems.

- Postgraduate offerings
  - Postgraduate diploma in Security and Strategic Studies
  - Master of Arts in Security and Strategic Studies (MA-SSS)

The MA-SSS programme was the first implemented as a joint curriculum between UNAM and the Ministry of Defence in 2007. It is a master's level degree. It mainly enrolls senior officers of the Namibian military. In 2012 the postgraduate diploma in Security and Strategic Studies was also initiated by the Ministry of Defence and UNAM as a "bridging" course to help students prepare for the tougher Master of Arts in Security and Strategic Studies degree course.
