= Defence Health Services (Namibia) =

- Country: Namibia
- Role: Medical support
- Part of: Namibia Defence Force

Commanders
- Chief of Staff: Brigadier General Ndapandula Jacob

The Defence Health Services Directorate is the branch of the Namibian Defence Force responsible for medical facilities and the training and deployment of all medical personnel within the force. It is a significant actor in the effort to control HIV/AIDS within the NDF.

== Organisation ==
The Directorate is headquartered in Windhoek at the Ministry of Defence Headquarters. It is headed by the chief of staff who is normally a qualified medical officer, the chief of staff Holds the rank of brigadier general and functions as the surgeon general. The roles of the directorate is to direct health policy, provide medical supply and the maintenance of health facilities and training and deployment of Medical personnel.

=== Mobile Military Health ===
- Mobile Field Hospital

Donated by Germany in 2013, it was commissioned in 2019. The Mobile hospital is rated as a United Nations Level I hospital. It has a capacity of 40 outpatients a day and 20 in-house patient bed capacity, It has two intensive care units, an x-ray unit and laboratories. It can support a battalion group sized combat deployment. It is commanded by Colonel O. Iindombo.

=== Tertiary Military Health ===
- Grootfontein Military Hospital

The Hospital is situated at the Grootfontein Military Base. It has a capacity for 80 patients, a casualty department, an operating theatre, X-ray facilities and in- and out-patient departments.

- Peter Mueshihange Military Center

=== Military Health Training ===
- Medical Training Wing

A central medical training facility is being built at the Osona Military Base. The Wing is commanded by Lt Col Amutenya.

== Deployment ==
Military Health practitioners are deployed at Sick Bays across all military bases. They also deploy on Peace Support Missions with infantry units.

=== Vehicles ===
DHS mainly employs three types of Ambulances

Name	Image	Origin	Type	Acquired	In service	Notes
Wer'wolf MKII		Namibia	Mine protected ambulance		-	
Toyota Land Cruiser		Japan	4x4 ambulance		-	
Toyota HiAce		Japan	ambulance		-	Based on the Toyota Quantum bus

== Leadership ==
Directorate Defence Health Services
From	Chief of Staff	To	Ribbon
1999	Brigadier General Sophia Ndeitunga	2024	
2024	Brigadier General Ndapandula Jacob	2024	
