= John Mutwa =

Namibian military officer (1960–2021)

John Sinvula Mutwa
- Born: 23 September 1960; Mahundu, Namibia (then South-West Africa, South Africa)
- Died: 17 June 2021 (aged 60); Katima Mulilo, Zambezi Region, Namibia
- Burial place: Mahundu, Namibia
- Military career
- Allegiance: Namibia
- Branch: Namibian Army
- Service years: PLAN (1975–1989); Namibian Army (1990–2020)
- Rank: Lieutenant general
- Commands: Chief of Staff: Logistics (2006–2011); Army Commander (2011–2013); Chief of Defence Force (2013–2020)
- Conflicts: Namibian War of Independence; Second Congo War
- Awards: Excellent Order of the Eagle, First Class

Lieutenant General John Sinvula Mutwa (23 September 1960 – 17 June 2021) was a Namibian military officer whose last appointment was as chief of the Namibian Defence Force (NDF). He was appointed the commander of the Namibian Army in 2011, and NDF Chief on 31 December 2013, a position from which he retired on 31 March 2020.

== Career ==
=== PLAN ===
Mutwa's military career began in 1975 when he joined the People's Liberation Army of Namibia in Zambia. In 1976 he underwent military training in Kongwa, Tanzania, and completed the officer cadet course. In 1978 he then completed the Intelligence and Counter Intelligence Course in the former Yugoslavia. Between 1979 and 1980 he was the Regional Staff Officer for Administration on the Eastern Front, while between 1980 and 1989 he was the regional chief of reconnaissance at the eastern and northern fronts.

=== NDF ===
In 1990 he joined the Namibian Defence Force as a pioneer and was given the rank of lieutenant Colonel and appointed assistant director: military intelligence. In 1994 he was reassigned as the commanding officer of Namibia's logistic support battalion in Grootfontein with the same rank. In 1996 he was promoted to colonel and appointed army chief of staff in the office of the army commander. In 1998 he was redeployed as the army chief of staff: personnel and logistics, in this position he was then deployed to Operation Atlantic, Namibia's contribution to the SADC allied forces to the DRC during the Second Congo War. While deployed in DRC he was appointed the chief of staff of the SADC Allied Forces between 1999 and 2000 and seconded as a commissioner on the Joint Military Commission on DRC in 2000. Namibia's Operation Atlantic ended in 2002 with all troops deployed back to Namibia. In 2004 he was appointed the Defence Attache to Angola. In 2006 he was promoted to brigadier general and appointed the chief of staff logistics at Defence HQ. Mutwa was appointed commander of the army in April 2011. At this occasion, he was promoted from brigadier general to major general. He served in that position until 31 December 2013, when he took over the position as NDF Chief from Lieutenant General Epaphras Denga Ndaitwah. He retired from active military service in March 2020. In March 2024 the Naval Base Impalila was renamed after him.

=== Qualifications ===
1976 – Officer Cadet Course – Tanzania

1981 – 1982 Political Science and Leadership Course – USSR.

1993 – 1994 Senior Command and Staff Course- United States.

1995 – Military Logistics Officers Course – UK.

1996 – Advanced Military Law Course at the UNAM.

1997 – Defence Executive Management Course joint programme between the University of Witwatersrand & UNAM.

1998 – 1999 – National Security Strategy Course – South Africa.

== Honours and decorations ==
- Excellent Order of the Eagle, First Class.
- Namibian Army Pioneer Medal
- Mandume Ya Ndemufayo Operation Medal
- Independence Medal
- Army Ten Years Service Medal
- Army Twenty Years Service Medal
- Campaign Medal
- NDF Commendation Medal

== Private life ==
Mutwa was married with three children. He died on 17 June 2021 at Katima Mulilo from COVID-19. He was declared a national hero of Namibia and awarded a state funeral. President Hage Geingob also declared three days of mourning. He was interred with full military honours at Mahundu village in the Zambezi Region on 1 July 2021.

Military offices
| Preceded by Brigadier James Auala | Chief of Staff: Defence Logistics; 2006 – 2011 | Succeeded by Brigadier General Joseph Kakoto |
| Preceded by Major General Peter Nambundunga | Commander Namibian Army; 2011 – 2013 | Succeeded by Major General Tomas Hamunyela |
| Preceded by Lieutenant General Epaphras Denga Ndaitwah | Chief of Defence Force; 31 December 2013 – 31 March 2020 | Succeeded by Air Marshal Martin Pinehas |
