= Epaphras Denga Ndaitwah =

Namibian diplomat and military officer (born 1952)

Lieutenant General Epaphras Denga Ndaitwah

First Gentleman of Namibia
- Incumbent
- Assumed role 21 March 2025
- President: Netumbo Nandi-Ndaitwah
- Preceded by: Sustjie Mbumba (As First Lady)

Second Gentleman of Namibia
- In role 4 February 2024 – 21 March 2025
- Vice President: Netumbo Nandi-Ndaitwah
- Preceded by: Sustjie Mbumba (As Second Lady)
- Succeeded by: Adam Hendrik Witbooi

Personal details
- Born: 13 December 1952 (age 73) Namibia (then South West Africa)
- Spouse: Netumbo Nandi-Ndaitwah

Military service
- Allegiance: Namibia
- Branch/service: People's Liberation Army of Namibia; Namibian Army
- Years of service: 1974–2014
- Rank: Lieutenant General
- Commands: Chief of Defence Force
- Battles/wars: Namibian War of Independence; Second Congo War

Lt. Gen. Epaphras Denga Ndaitwah (born 13 December 1952) is a Namibian diplomat, former military officer and currently serving as First Gentleman of Namibia since 21 March 2025. He served as the chief of the Namibia Defence Force (NDF) from 24 January 2011 to 31 December 2013.

== Early life ==
Born in Ohangwena Region, Ndaitwah joined SWAPO's military wing, the People's Liberation Army of Namibia (PLAN), in 1974 and participated in Namibia's struggle for independence in various positions. He attended military training in the Soviet Union, Yugoslavia, India, Nigeria, Zambia and Tanzania.

== NDF career ==
At Namibia's independence in 1990, Ndaitwah became the first military assistant to the Chief of the Defence Force, Lieutenant General Dimo Hamaambo. He held the rank of Lieutenant Colonel at that time. In 1994 he was promoted to the rank of Colonel and appointed Combat Support Brigade Commander based at Otavi. When Walvis Bay was reunified with Namibia the Brigade Headquarters was moved to Rooikop Military Base. He became Deputy Commander of the Army in 1997 and promoted to Brigadier General. In 1998 he was deployed to Operation Atlantic, Namibia's participation in the Second Congo War. Until 2006, Ndaitwah served as chargé d’affaires of Namibia to the Democratic Republic of Congo. He was promoted to Major General in 2008 and appointed Chief of Operations, Plans and Training to Lieutenant General, in 2011 on the occasion of his appointment as Chief of the Namibian Defence Force, succeeding Lieutenant General Martin Shalli. He served in that position until the end of 2013 when Lieutenant General John Sinvula Mutwa was appointed new Chief of the NDF.

In 2007, Ndaitwah graduated with a master's degree in Strategic Studies from University of Ibadan, Nigeria. In 2011, he was a student of public management at the Polytechnic of Namibia.

== Post-retirement ==
Ndaitwah worked at the International University of Management for five years as a Senior Lecturer and the Head of Strategic Management and Business Administration faculty before becoming a member of the Governing council for four years which amounted to a total of 9 years. Ndaitwah resigned from the IUM on 16 May 2024.

== Literal work ==
Ndaitwah authored two books titled 'A life and Views of a Soldier: Author's Perspective' and 'Strategic Leadership and Management the Direction Pointers'. Over his career he also wrote over forty articles to Namibian newspapers and authored one journal article published in the African Armed Forces.

== Medals and awards ==
- Most Distinguished Order of Namibia 1st Class
- Army Ten Years Service Medal
- Campaign Medal (DRC)
- NDF Commendation Medal
- UNAVEM Medal

Military offices
Preceded by Lieutenant General Martin Shalli	Chief of the Defence Force (Namibia); 2011 – 2013	Succeeded by Lieutenant General John Mutwa
Unknown	Chief of Staff Operations; 2008 – 2011	Succeeded by Major General Shaanika Amukwaya
Unknown	Deputy Commander Namibian Army; 1997 – 2006	Unknown
Unknown	Commander Combant Support Brigade; 1994 – 1997	Succeeded by Colonel Sanherib "Shikololo" Amwaalwa
