= James Auala =

Namibian military officer from 1974–2005

- Born: 1947 (age 78–79); Namibia (then South West Africa, South Africa)
- Military career
- Allegiance: Namibia
- Branch: PLAN; Namibian Army
- Service years: 1974-2005
- Rank: Brigadier General
- Commands: Chief of Staff Logistics(1995-2005)
- Conflicts: Namibian War of Independence Second Congo War
- Awards: Most distinguished order of Namibia First Class
- Other work: August 26

Brigadier General James Auala is a retired Namibian military commander and business person. Auala was appointed as Chief of Staff Logistics of the Namibian Defence Force (NDF) retiring in 2005.

== Early life and exile ==
Auala worked for the South West Africa Broadcasting Corporation between 1972 and 1974 as a radio announcer. Auala went into exile in July 1974

== Military career ==
He received military training in PLAN serving in various roles including PLAN Chief of Intelligence. Auala attended the yrstrel Military Academy in Moscow graduating from the Motorized Infantry Brigade Commander course in 1985. Upon independence, PLAN and the South West African Territorial Force (SWATF) merged to form the Namibia Defence Force (NDF) Auala joined the Force receiving a senior officer rank. In 1995 he was appointed as Chief of Staff Logistics replacing Colonel Peter Nambundunga serving in that role for some ten years. During the Second Congo War he led the first Namibian Battle group to the DRC under Operation Atlantic

== Retirement ==
After retiring from Active service Auala joined Namibian Defence ministry owned August 26 Holdings as chief executive officer.

== Honours and decorations ==
- Most distinguished order of Namibia First Class
- DRC Campaign Medal

Military offices
Preceded by Colonel Peter Nambundunga	Chief of Staff Logistics; 1995 – 2005	Succeeded by Brigadier John Mutwa
