= Holden Uulenga =

Namibian military officer

Holden Japuleni Chrispus Uulenga
- Born: 5 January 1955 (age 71); Namibia (then South-West Africa, South Africa)
- Died: February 16, 2021 (aged 66)
- Military career
- Allegiance: Namibia
- Branch: People's Liberation Army of Namibia; Namibian Army
- Service years: 1974–2015
- Rank: Brigadier General
- Commands: General Officer Commanding 26 Motorised Infantry Brigade
- Conflicts: Namibian War of Independence

Brigadier General Holden Uulenga was a retired Namibian military officer. His last command was as the GOC 26 Motorized Infantry Brigade of the Namibian Army.

== Career ==
In 1974, General Uulenga, also referred to as "Hollo," joined the liberation war and left the nation. After receiving PLAN Infantry training at Angola's Cassaba Base, he was sent to Cunene Province where he fought at the front both inside and near Namibia's borders. He held a number of PLAN roles during his exile, including deputy brigade commander for logistical units, field commander to detachment commissar.

He was returned to his home country in 1989. In 1990 he was a pioneer of the NDF officer corps as he was inducted. He served in various capacities and ranks within the military. He was given the rank of major and appointed as astaff officer specializing in counterintelligence. After moving up the ranks, he was promoted to Brigadier General, a position he retained until his retirement from active duty in 2015. He held a number of posts in the NDF military during his tenure, including, General Officer Commanding 26 Motorized Infantry Brigade, Deputy Commander of the 21 Motorized Infantry Brigade, SSO Security Intelligence, SSO CounterIntelligence at the Defence Headquarters (DHQ). He Also served as the Eastern Front Chief of Staff during Operation Atlantic (Democratic Republic of Congo) in the Democratic Republic of the Congo. He passed on in February 2021.

== Burial ==
A State Funeral was held in his honour and he was buried at Ongulumbashe on 1 March 2021.

== Honours and decorations ==
- Namibian Army Pioneer Medal
- Army Ten Years Service Medal
- NDF Commendation Medal 3rd Class
- NDF Commendation Medal 1st Class
- Campaign Medal

Military offices
Preceded by	GOC 26 Motorised Infantry Brigade; Unknown Date – Unknown Date	Succeeded by
