= Karel Ndjoba =

Namibian military officer

Karel Christopher Ndjoba
- Born: 28 July 1961; Namibia (then South-West Africa, South Africa)
- Died: November 16, 2014 (aged 53); Germany
- Burial place: Windhoek
- Military career
- Allegiance: Namibia
- Branch: SWATF; Namibian Army
- Service years: 1978-2014
- Rank: Brigadier General
- Commands: Chief of Staff: Personnel
- Awards

Brigadier General Karel Christopher Ndjoba was a Namibian military officer whose last appointment was as Defence Attaché to Germany. His father Cornelius Tuhafeni Ndjoba was chief minister of Ovamboland.

== Career ==
=== SWATF career ===
Ndjoba's military career began in SWATF, the military arm of South Africa's Administration of Namibia in 1978; he served in 101 Battalion. Due to his leadership qualities he was selected for officer training, becoming one of the first black officers in the battalion. He later became a company commander.

=== NDF career ===
Ndjoba joined the Namibian Defence Force as a pioneer, at Independence on 21 March 1990 Ndjoba was part of the first SWATF and PLAN combined battalion on parade with the new national colors as a company commander deputised by Victor Simunja. General Ndjoba served extensively in the Joint operations directorate of the Namibian Defence force were in 2002 he was promoted to colonel and appointed as senior staff officer operations. He also served as a brigade second in command in DRC during the Second Congo War. He served as a part of directing staff at the SADC Regional PeaceKeeping Centre in Zimbabwe and was part of the interim Planning Element for the SADC Standby Force at SADC Secretariat in Botswana. He was promoted to brigadier general in 2009 and appointed as NDF Chief of Staff Personnel at Defence HeadQuarters. He also served as chairman of the ISDSC Working Group on Human Resources. He was then appointed as defence attache to Germany in 2014. He died on 16 November 2014

=== Qualifications ===
- Masters of Arts in Security and Strategic Studies-UNAM
- Senior Command and Staff Course-Canadian Land Forces Command and Staff College
- Advanced Military Law course
- International Collective Training Briefing Course, Britain
- Executive Course in Managing Multinational peace Mission at the Witwatersrand University

== Honours and decorations ==
- NDF Commendation Medal
- NDF Commendation Medal(Silver).
- Campaign Medal
- Army Ten Years Service Medal
- SADC Brigade Service Medal
