= Helena Amutenya =

Namibian military officer

- Ndilimeke
- Born: c.1984 Katutura, Windhoek, Namibia
- Spouse: Aktofel Ndengu
- Relatives: 3 daughters Aina Ndamono; Saima Ndapunikwa; Hilma Ndatala
- Military career
- Allegiance: Namibia
- Branch: Namibian Army
- Service years: 2007-
- Rank: Brigadier General
- Nickname: Debbie
- Commands: Defence Legal Services

Brigadier General Helena Amutenya is a Namibian military officer who is serving as the Director, Defence Legal Services.

== Career ==
Brigadier General Helena Amutenya the military as a recruit in 2007. After basic military training she was appointed as a senior legal officer with the rank of captain until 2009. She was then appointed chief legal officer in 2009. In 2014, she was promoted to colonel. In 2018, she was appointed as the head of Defence Legal Services although retaining her colonel rank. In November 2021, she was promoted to the rank of brigadier general, becoming only the fourth female general officer in the Namibian Defence Force.

== Qualifications ==
She received her Bachelor of Laws (LLB) from the University of Namibia in 2006 and her Master of Laws (LLM) from Stellenbosch University in 2013. Graduated Cum Laude Masters in Security & Strategic Studies at the National Defense University in the People’s Republic of China in 2025.

== Honours and decorations ==
- Army Ten Years Service Medal

Military offices
Preceded by Brigadier General Veikko Kavungo	Director Defence Legal Services; 2018-Incumbent	Incumbent
