= Martin Shalli =

Namibian Army general (born 1954)

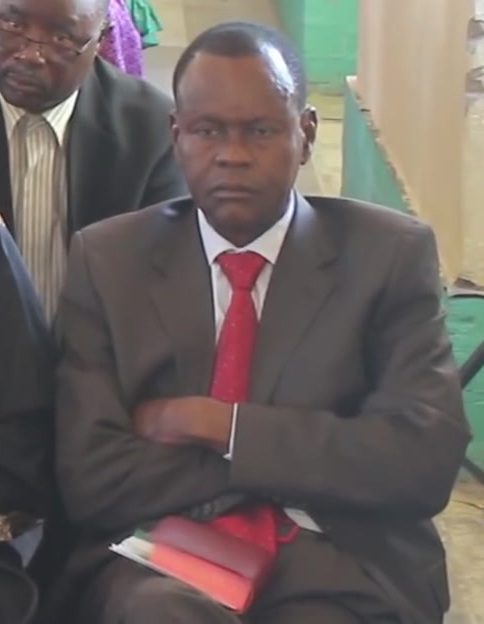
- Born: 1 January 1954 (age 72); Namibia (then South-West Africa, South Africa)
- Military career
- Allegiance: Namibia
- Branch: People's Liberation Army of Namibia; Namibian Army
- Service years: 1971–2012
- Rank: Lieutenant General
- Commands: Chief Of Defence Force (2006-2011); Namibian Army (2000-2005); Operations (1990-1995)
- Conflicts: South African Border War; Second Congo War

Lieutenant General Martin Shalli is a former Namibian diplomat and military commander. In 2005, he was appointed Namibia's High Commissioner to Zambia by President Sam Nujoma, but he was recalled in October 2006 by Nujoma's successor, Hifikepunye Pohamba, and appointed Chief of the Namibia Defence Force (NDF). He replaced controversial NDF commander Solomon Huwala, and he was replaced as High Commissioner to Zambia by regional councillor Solomon Witbooi.

In July 2009, Shalli was suspended by President Pohamba due to "serious allegations of irregularities". Without the alleged irregularities being proven, refuted, or even officially substantiated, Shalli retired with full military privileges in January 2011.

== Career ==
=== PLAN ===
Shalli joined SWAPO's military wing, the People's Liberation Army of Namibia (PLAN) in 1971 in exile and eventually was trained as an anti-aircraft artillery battalion commander in the Soviet Union before eventually becoming a PLAN platoon commander, he was then appointed to Detachment commander. Shalli was then promoted to the position of Chief of Air Defence at the North Eastern front, afterwards he was made Chief of Staff of the North Eastern Front. By the end of the war he was the PLAN Chief of Operations.

=== NDF ===
When PLAN merged into the military structure to help create independent Namibia's military, the Namibia Defence Force, Shalli was given the position of Policy and Operations Director with the rank of Brigadier General. He was then promoted to major general and appointed NDF Chief of Staff in 1995 replacing Major General Charles Namholo. Between 2000 and 2005 he was the Army Commander with the rank of major general. He was then appointed in 2005 to 2006 as the Namibian High Commissioner to Zambia. In 2006 he was promoted to lieutenant general and appointed to Chief of Defence Force, Namibian Defence Force. In 2009, Shalli was suspended from the NDF due to allegations of fraud. He allegedly had large amounts of money given to him by a company working in Namibia from the People's Republic of China from which the NDF bought equipment. Major General Peter Nambundunga was appointed to act in position.

== Honours and decorations ==
- Order of Eagle 2nd Class
- Omugulugwombashe Medal
- Army Pioneer Medal
- Operation Mandume campaign Medal
- NDF Commendation Medal
- Namibian Cross for bravery (Gold) Medal
- Namibian Cross for bravery (Silver) Medal

Military offices
Preceded by Solomon Huwala	Chief of Defence Force; 2006 – 24 January 2011	Succeeded by Epaphras Denga Ndaitwah
Preceded by Solomon Huwala	Commander Namibian Army; 2000 – 2005	Succeeded by Peter Nambundunga
Preceded by Charles Namoloh	NDF Chief of Staff; 1995 – 2000	Succeeded by Peter Nambundunga
Preceded by Vacant	Director Policy and Operations; 1990 – 1995	Unknown
