= Peter Nanyemba =

Swapo Secretary of Defence
- In office 1970–1983
- Succeeded by: Peter Mweshihange

Personal details
- Born: 1935 Ovamboland, South West Africa
- Died: 1 April 1983 (aged 47–48)
- Party: SWAPO
- Occupation: Diplomat
- Profession: Military commander

Peter Eneas Nanyemba, also known as Ndilimani Lyomukunda Wamupolo (1935–1983), was a commander of the People's Liberation Army of Namibia (PLAN) during the South African Border War. Nanyemba worked as a diplomat, representing SWAPO in Botswana and Tanzania, before he was elected as the party Secretary of Defence in 1970. He played an important role as the chief organizer of PLAN during the beginning stages of the war of independence. Nanyemba is considered a national hero in Namibia.

== Early years and career ==
Nanyemba was born and grew up in Ovamboland in the north of Namibia and had to work as a herder during his school years. He subsequently moved to Walvis Bay where he participated in the circles critical of the apartheid regime. He joined the Ovamboland People's Organization (OPO) in 1958 while working in Walvis Bay. Nanyemba became aware of the harshness of the colonial and apartheid system. He was inspired and encouraged by many who shared his vision of a free and independent Namibia. When SWAPO was formed in 1960, Nanyemba became one of its leading activists and was later elected as its secretary for the Walvis Bay branch where he started with anti-colonial campaigns and mobilization of the masses of the people to resist colonial authority. As a result, he was arrested in 1961, detained, and deported back to Ovamboland.

In 1962, Nanyemba left Namibia to join other SWAPO leaders abroad in Dar-es-Salaam, Tanzania. He quickly rose through the ranks and was appointed as Chief Representative for SWAPO in Botswana in 1963. He was recalled to Tanzania in 1964 to serve as Chief Representative for East Africa, a position he held until 1969. During the controversial SWAPO Tanga Consultative Conference that took place between 1969 and 1970, Nanyemba was elected SWAPO Secretary of Defence, a crucial position at the time as the struggle for independence was getting more intense.

Following the collapse of the Portuguese colonial empire in Africa in 1974 thousands of young Namibians fled the country via Angola to join SWAPO and thus swelled the ranks of PLAN. It was at this stage of the struggle that Nanyemba began to play an important role in developing and organising PLAN into a real guerrilla fighting force. He was instrumental in arranging training and equipping PLAN. Under his leadership in 1977, the Swapo Military Council was reconstituted as the highest decision-making body of PLAN. He became the first chairman of the military council and chaired it until 1982, when Sam Nujoma as commander in chief took over. In 1977, with the help of the Soviet military advisers he established the Tobias Hainyeko Training Centre (THTC) in Lubango. The four military regions, Eastern, North Eastern, Northern and North Western, were created under his leadership in 1977. He help set up another training centre, Jumbo Training Centre (JTC), west of Lubango in 1978. In 1979, under his supervision, the Operational Command Headquarters (OCHQ) was established. This was the headquarter of PLAN. Nanyemba had many achievements with PLAN under his leadership as SWAPO Secretary for Defence making PLAN the effective and efficient fighting machine it was.

== Death ==
Nanyemba was killed on 1 April 1983 in a car accident in Lubango, in Angola's Huíla Province, when his vehicle collided with a petrol tanker. His death occurred amid serious tensions between SWAPO's military leadership and its security apparatus, leading to speculation about the circumstances surrounding the incident. His remains were repatriated from Angola 31 years after his death and reburied at Windhoek Heroes Acre.

A primary school was built and named after him in Angola in 2005, also a rehabilitation of the cemetery and a monument outside Lubango at the cost of N$8,5 million. The long Monte Christo Road in Windhoek was completely named after him in December 2021.
