= Ben Kadhila =

Ben Uuyamba Kadhila
- Born: 1 June 1958 (age 68); Namibia (then South-West Africa, South Africa)
- Military career
- Allegiance: Namibia
- Branch: Namibian Army
- Rank: Major General
- Commands: Chief of Staff: Joint Operations; Commander Special Forces.
- Conflicts: Namibian War of Independence
- Awards: Grand Command of the Most Excellent Order of Namibia, Second Class

Major General Ben Uuyamba Kadhila is a retired Namibian military officer whose last appointment was as Chief Joint Operations of the Namibian Defence Force (NDF). He served as the first Commander of the Namibian Special Forces, and retired in July 2018.

== PLAN career ==
During the Cuito Cuanavale battles Kadhila was the commander of PLAN'S Tiger battalion attached to FAPLA and Cuban forces. He also served as the Chief of Staff PLAN eighth Battalion.

== NDF career ==
Major General Kadhila was inducted into the NDF in 1990 with the rank of captain. He progressed through various ranks until he was promoted to colonel and appointed as senior staff officer current operations. He was the first contingent commander of Namibian forces deployed to the DRC under operation Atlantic as from 1998 to 2001. In 2005 as a colonel, Kadhila attended the Kenya National Defence College, after which he joined the Special Forces earning his parachute jump wings and appointed as commander Special Forces. He was promoted to brigadier general and appointed as deputy joint operations chief. His last appointment was as chief of staff Joint Operations

== Retirement ==
After retirement General Kadhila was appointed as managing director of Windhoeker Maschinenfabrik.

== Qualifications ==
- 2005 NDC - Kenya
- psc qualification - Zimbabwe

== Honours and decorations ==
- Namibian Army Pioneer Medal.
- NDF Commendation Medal
- Grand Command of the Most Excellent Order of Namibia 2nd Class
- Army Ten Years Medal
- Army Twenty Years Service Medal

=== Proficiency and Qualification Badges ===
- Parachute Wings(Static line)
- Special Forces Operator Badge
