= List of Namibian Air Officers =

The following is a list of people who have attained Air rank within the Namibian Air Force (NAF).

== Key ==
Abbreviation	Rank
Air Cdre	Air commodore
AVM	Air vice-marshal
Air Mshl	Air marshal

The Air Force were previously used Army ranks and insignia but this was changed circa 2010 in line with international norms.

== List ==
Rank	Name	Last position held	Notes	Dates of service
AM	Martin Pinehas	Chief of Defence Force	first Air Force Commander	1993-currently
AVM	Teofilus Shaende	Air Force Commander	Second Air Force Commander	1999-Currently
Air Cdre	Paavo Kamanya	Defence Attaché to India	Second Deputy Air Force Commander	1990-unknown date
Air Cdre	Abed Hihepa	Deputy Air Force Commander	Third Deputy Air Force Commander	1996-Currently
Air Cdre	Fillemon Sisco Iitembu	Chief of Staff Defence Logistics		1990-2021
Air Cdre	Mackenzie Tjivera	Defence Attaché to India		unknown date-Currently
Air Cdre	Retoveni Muhenje	Chief Staff Defence Human Resources		1996-Currently
Air Cdre	Andima Iyambo	Chief of Staff Defence ICT		unknown date-Currently
Air Cdre	Nahor Gowaseb	Principal Staff Officer in CDF Office		1996-Currently
