= Erasmus Amupolo =

Namibian military officer

Erasmus Kayambu Amupolo
- Born: 25 March 1954 (age 72); Oshuungu Village, Elim Namibia (then South-West Africa, South Africa)
- Died: February 16, 2021 (aged 66)
- Burial place: Elim, Omusati Region
- Military career
- Allegiance: Namibia
- Branch: People's Liberation Army of Namibia; Namibian Army
- Service years: 1974–2014
- Rank: Brigadier General
- Commands: General Officer Commanding 26 Motorised Infantry Brigade
- Conflicts: Namibian War of Independence

Brigadier General Erasmus Kayambu Amupolo is a retired Namibian military officer. His last command was as the GOC 26 Motorized Infantry Brigade of the Namibian Army.

== Career ==
In 1974, General Amupolo, also referred to as "Kayambu k'Amupolo," joined the liberation war and left the nation. After receiving PLAN Infantry and Anti Aircraft training at Angola's Cassaba Base. Before rising to the position of chief of air defense for the Northern Front, he served as an infantryman. He founded the Northwestern Front in 1983, and under commander Erastus Negonga, he was named chief of staff.

He was returned to his home country in 1989 and was deployed in Namibia an armament keeper. In 1990 he was a pioneer of the NDF officer corps as he was inducted as an officer. Amupolo joined the NDF in 1990 and served in a variety of roles and ranks. He was inducted As a lieutenant colonel and he began serving as the 262 Battalion's commanding officer. Later on, he was elevated to colonel and appointed deputy commandant of the military School. Before retiring in 2014, he was once more promoted to brigadier-general and commanded the 12th and 26th Brigades.

== Burial ==
A State Funeral was held in his honour and he was buried at Elim on 12 August 2017.

== Honours and decorations ==
- Namibian Army Pioneer Medal
- Army Ten Years Service Medal
- NDF Commendation Medal
- Campaign Medal

Military offices
Preceded by	GOC 26 Motorised Infantry Brigade; Unknown Date – Unknown Date	Succeeded by
