= Sakaria Nashandi =

Namibian politician (born 1949)

Sakaria Zaa Nashandi (born 8 July 1949 in Onayena) is a Namibian politician, businessman and an ex-Robben Island political prisoner. He is a recognised National Hero of Namibia for his contributions to the independence of the country.

Nashandi attended school in Onayena and was actively involved in the Ovamboland People's Congress, the predecessor of SWAPO.

He owns several small businesses in and around Onayena. Nashandi married Kauna Nashandi, a former mayor of Ondangwa, who died in Windhoek in 2013.
