= Patrick Iyambo =

- Born: Patrick Israel Yalombweleni Iyambo; 1939; Uukwalumbe, Ongandjera
- Died: 25 July 1991 (aged 51–52)
- Military career
- Conflicts: South African Border War

Patrick Israel Yalombweleni Iyambo (1939 at Uukwalumbe, Ongandjera – 25 July 1991) affectionately known as Lungada, was an icon of the armed liberation struggle of Namibia and fighter of the first battle in the Namibian War of Independence which took place at Ongulumbashe (Omugulugombashe), in the northern section of South West Africa, in an attack against the People's Liberation Army of Namibia (PLAN), the armed wing of the South West Africa People's Organisation in 26 August 1966. The War of Independence (part of the larger South African Border War, which included fighting with soldiers from Angola, would continue until 1989. 26 August 26 is now celebrated as "Heroes Day".

== Honours ==
- Israel Patrick Iyambo Police College is a police training institution named after Patrick Iyambo. He was one of the PLAN combatants who was engaged in the first battle with then South African occupational forces in Namibia on the 26 August 1966 at a place called Omugulugwombashe in northern Namibia.
- The late Lungada was appointed as the first Unit Commander of the VIP Protection Division in an independent Namibia in 1990.
