= Tobias Hainyeko =

Namibian military commander and politician

- Born: 1932
- Died: 1967 (aged 34–35)
- Military career
- Allegiance: SWAPO
- Service years: 1960–1967
- Commands: Commander of People's Liberation Army of Namibia
- Conflicts: Namibian War of Independence †

Tobias Hainyeko (1932–1967) was a Namibian guerrilla fighter who served as the first commander of the People's Liberation Army of Namibia (PLAN) during the Namibian War of Independence from the 1960s through to the 1980s.

== Early life and career ==
Hainyeko was born in northern Namibia in 1932.

In the early 1950s, Hainyeko arrived in Cape Town, South Africa just after the Ovamboland People's Congress (OPC) was formed. He immediately integrated with the group and became one of its prominent members. Hainyeko spent valuable years working in Cape Town, sharing political experiences with the likes of Andimba Toivo ya Toivo and Andreas Shipanga. In 1959, just before the Old Location Massacre, he returned to Namibia, but left the country again in 1960 following Sam Nujoma to Dar-es-Salaam, Tanzania. After meeting Nujoma in Tanzania, he learned that SWAPO was preparing for armed struggle and became one of the first SWAPO members to volunteer for military training. He then went for military training, first in Algeria, then in the Soviet Union. He returned to Tanzania and helped set up a military training centre in Kongwa for new recruits. It was from there that Hainyeko brought all trained cadres together and moved to establish the first guerrilla force for an armed insurgency. In 1962, Hainyeko was appointed First Deputy Army Commander of the South West Africa Liberation Army (SWALA), the predecessor of PLAN.

In 1965 Hainyeko, together with Peter Nanyemba and John Nankudhu, led the first group of SWALA combatants from their military camp in Kongwa, Tanzania via Nakonde, Zambia to the Namibian border at Sesheke to commence the armed struggle in Namibia. Through careful planning under his leadership, SWAPO established a guerrilla training base at Omugulugwombashe in northern Namibia. It was from the Omugulugwombashe base that SWALA guerrillas launched its armed struggle against the South African administration on 26 August 1966, this would mark the beginning of the Namibian War of Independence which lasted until 1989.

== Death ==
On May 18, 1967, while on combat mission to improve communications between his operational headquarters in Tanzania and PLAN's guerrilla units in Namibia, he shot and seriously wounded two South African policemen patrolling the Kwando river. Later that day he was killed in action as he was intending to cross the Kwando river. He was replaced as SWALA commander by his deputy Dimo Hamaambo.

Hainyeko went to meet a colleague from Namibia at Sesheke village, which straddles the Namibia-Zambian border. SWAPO reported that he was betrayed to the South Africans by the local manager of Caltex, who ran barges along the Zambezi from Katima Mulilo. Other allegations indicated that he was betrayed by some SWAPO leaders in fear of his bravery and good leadership qualities.

The news of Hainyeko's death only reached SWAPO's provisional headquarters in Dar-es-Salaam two days later. In 1977, PLAN established the Tobias Hainyeko Training Centre (THTC) in Lubango and named it after him.

Tobias Hainyeko constituency in Windhoek is named after him, as are a street and a primary school in the city.
