= Martin Pinehas =

Namibian military officer (born 1962)

Martin Kambulu Pinehas
- Born: 11 November 1962 (age 63); Ondangwa, Namibia
- Military career
- Allegiance: Namibia
- Branch: Namibian Air Force
- Rank: Air Marshal
- Commands: Chief of Defence Force (2020-present); Commander, Namibian Air Force (2002-20)
- Awards: Excellent Order of the Eagle, third Class

Martin Kambulu Pinehas is a Namibian military officer who is serving as the Chief of the Defence Force, he previously served as commander of the Namibian Air Force. He was appointed the commander of the Air Wing of the Namibian Defence Force in 2000. He has over 3700 flight hours of experience, including 700 as an instructor.

== Military career ==
=== PLAN ===
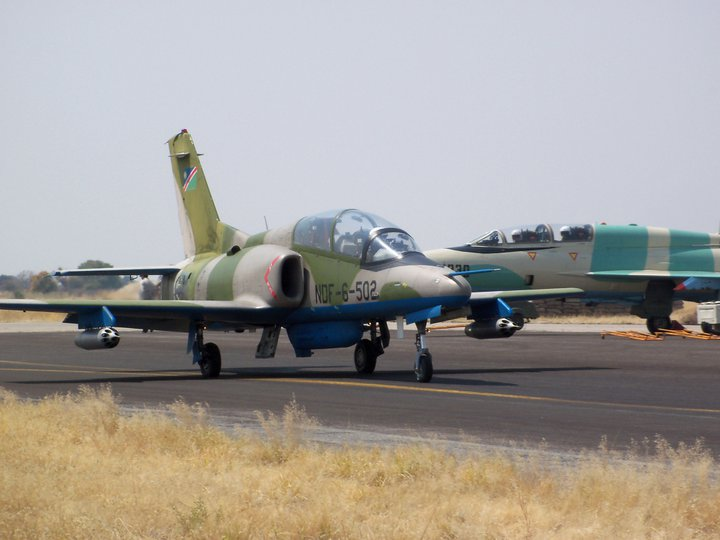
K-8 jet, a type flown by Pinehas

Pinehas joined SWAPO's armed wing, the People's Liberation Army of Namibia, in 1980 and was deployed to the Cadet Military Academy in Cuba which he completed in 1981 and was appointed deputy commander there. Between 1982 and 1983 he was serving at the PLAN Headquarters in Lubango, Angola. He was then sent for jet flying training in Libya between 1984 and 1989.

=== NDF ===
His career in the Namibian Defence Force started in 1993 after Namibia's independence when he was inducted with the rank of Lieutenant. In 1994 he was appointed the commanding officer of the 1st Air Wing squadron with the rank of Major. In 1998 he was promoted to the rank of lieutenant colonel and appointed the chief of staff of the Air Wing. In 2000 he was promoted to colonel and appointed Air Wing Commander. In 2002 he was appointed Air Force Commander. In 2005 when the Air Force was commissioned he was promoted to Brigadier General. The rank of air vice-marshal was bestowed in 2008. On the 31 March 2020 he was promoted to air marshal and appointed Chief of Defence Force becoming the first non Army General to occupy the position.

== Honours and decorations ==
- Most Excellent Order of the Eagle, Third Class.
- Mandume Ya Ndemufayo Operation Medal
- Air Cadre Medal
- Air Force Longevity Medal
- Air Force Commander's Exemplary Medal
- NDF Commendation Medal
- NDF Commendation Medal (Silver)
- NDF 30 Years Service Medal
- Santos-Dumont Merit Medal

Military offices
| Unknown | Commander Namibian Air Wing; 2000 – 2002 | Air Wing upgraded to Air Force |
| Air Force upgraded from Air Wing | Commander Namibian Air Force; 2002 – 31 March 2020 | Succeeded by Air Vice Marshal Teofilus Shaende |
| Preceded by Lieutenant General John Mutwa | Chief of Defence Force; 1 April 2020 – incumbent | Incumbent |
