= List of Namibian admirals =

The following is a list of people who have attained admiral rank within the Namibian Navy (NN).

== Key ==
| Abbreviation | Rank |
|---|---|
| Cdre | Commodore |
| R Adm (JG) | Rear Admiral (Junior Grade) |
| R Adm | Rear Admiral |
| V Adm | Vice Admiral |

The ranks of Flag Officers changed in 2007 when the rank previously called Commodore became known as Rear Admiral (Junior Grade).

| Rank | Name | Last position held | Notes | Dates of service |
|---|---|---|---|---|
| R Adm | Peter Vilho | Navy Commander | first navy Commander | 1990-2017 |
| R Adm | Sinsy Nghipandua | Navy Commander | second navy Commander | 1990-2020 |
| R Adm | Alweendo Amungulu | Navy Commander | Third Navy Commander | 1990-currently |
| R Adm | Sacheus !Gonteb | Navy Commander | Fourth Navy Commander | 1996-currently |
| R Adm(JG) | Lazarus Erastus | Deputy Navy Commander | | 1990-currently |
| R Adm(JG) | Setson Hangula | Chief of Staff Defence Intelligence | First Navy Admiral to get appointed as COS at Defence HQ's | 1990-Unknown date |
| R Adm(JG) | Gottlieb Pandeni | Commander Naval Operations | Third Commander of Naval OPS | 1996-currently |
| R Adm(JG) | Nehemia Shikongo | Commander Naval Support | Second Commander of Naval Support | 1990-2020 |
| R Adm(JG) | Lazarus Shitaleni | Commander Naval Support | Third Commander of Naval Support | 1990-currently |
| R Adm(JG) | Davison Mwoombola | Commander Naval Support | | Unknown date-currently |
| R Adm(JG) | Petrus Tjandja | Deputy Chief of Staff Joint Operations | first Navy Admiral to get appointed as Deputy COS at Defence HQ' | 1990-currently |
| R Adm(JG) | Naftal Shuumbwa | Commander Naval Support | fifth Commander of Naval Support, Is a Marine | 1990-currently |
