= Dimo Hamaambo =

Namibian military commander (1932–2002)

- Born: 27 October 1932; Eengava South West Africa, Union of South Africa (present-day Namibia)
- Died: 8 September 2002 (aged 69); Windhoek, Namibia
- Burial place: Heroes' Acre
- Military career
- Allegiance: Namibia
- Branch: People's Liberation Army of Namibia; Namibian Army
- Service years: 1962–2000
- Rank: Lieutenant General
- Commands: Commander of the People's Liberation Army of Namibia (PLAN) (1967–1990); Chief of Namibian Defence Force (NDF) (1990–2000)
- Conflicts: South African Border War; Second Congo War

Lieutenant General Mweukefina Kulaumone Jerobeam Dimo Hamaambo (27 October 1932 – 8 September 2002), better known as Dimo Hamaambo, was a Namibian military officer and chief of staff of the Namibian Defence Force from 1990 to 2000. He previously served as the commander of the People's Liberation Army of Namibia (PLAN) during the South African Border War, a position he was appointed to in 1967 after the death of Tobias Hainyeko and held until Namibia's independence in 1990.

== Early life ==
Hamaambo was one of the thirteen children of his mother Josephina Melila Shipo and father Jona Hamaambo in Eengava, Ovamboland (now known as Ohangwena Region). After receiving some education in area schools, Hamaambo went to work outside of Ovamboland as a contract labourer on a White owned farm as well as a domestic worker, at a cannery in Walvis Bay and eventually in the gold mines of Johannesburg, South Africa. Hamaambo eventually returned to Namibia and joined the Ovamboland People's Organization (OPO), a predecessor of the SWAPO, at Walvis Bay in 1959. In 1960–61, Hamaambo attempted to leave the country via a boat leaving Lobito, Angola for the United Kingdom but was caught and returned to Namibia.

== Exile ==
Hamaambo went into exile in 1962 through Bechuanaland (now Botswana) and into Tanganyika (now Tanzania). From Tanzania, Hamaambo went for military training in newly independent Algeria and later the Soviet Union before becoming Second Deputy Army Commander of what was to become the People's Liberation Army of Namibia (PLAN) in 1966, the year which began the Namibian War of Independence. Quickly rising through the ranks, Hamaambo become First Deputy in 1967 and Army Commander in 1968.

In 1974 the soldiers led by Hamaambo started using Cassinga, an abandoned Angolan iron ore mine, as a stopover point for a few weeks. They soon thereafter occupied the place which quickly became not only a military camp but also a refugee camp. Cassinga was attacked by air on 4 May 1978 by the South African Defence Force in the Battle of Cassinga. Hamaambo barely escaped.

He remained army commander of PLAN forces until PLAN's absorption into the new Namibian Defence Force in 1989. After PLAN's absorption, Hamaambo returned to Namibia prior to independence.

== Namibian Defence Force ==
Upon independence in March 1990, Hamaambo was named first Chief of Defence Force. He served until his retirement in 2000 at the age of 68. Hamaambo died in September 2002 and was the first person buried as a hero at Heroes' Acre, a war memorial south of Windhoek. Hamaambo also had the first ship of the Namibian Navy, the imperial Marinheiro class corvette NS Lt Gen Dimo Hamaambo, named after him. The Grootfontein Military Base is also named after him, Lt Gen Dimo Hamaambo Garrison.

== Honours and decorations ==
- Cross for Bravery: Gold
- Army Pioneer Medal
- Army Ten Years Service Medal

Military offices
| Preceded by Tobias Hainyeko | Commander of the People's Liberation Army of Namibia; 1967 – 1990 | Succeeded by position abolished |
| Preceded by position established | Chief of Defence Force; 1990 – 2000 | Succeeded by Solomon Huwala |
