= Peter Nambundunga =

Namibian military commander (1947–2019)

Petrus Kagadhinwa Nambundunga
- Born: 3 June 1947; Onesi, Onesi Constituency, Namibia (then South West Africa, South Africa)
- Died: January 14, 2019 (aged 71); Ongwediva
- Spouse: Cecilia Nambundunga
- Military career
- Allegiance: Namibia
- Branch: Namibian Army
- Service years: 1975-2011
- Rank: Major General
- Nickname: Cosmos
- Commands: Army Commander
- Conflicts: Namibian War of Independence Second Congo War
- Awards: Most distinguished order of Namibia First Class

Major General Petrus "Peter" Kagadhinwa Nambundunga (3 June 1947, Onesi Constituency – 14 January 2019, Ongwediva) was a Namibian military commander. Nambundunga was appointed the commander of the army in 2005, replacing Martin Shalli when he was promoted to chief of the Namibian Defence Force (NDF).

== Early life and exile ==
Nambundunga was born as one of nine children of Reverend Paavo Nambundunga on 3 June 1947 in Onesi in the Onesi Constituency in Ovamboland (today Omusati Region). He completed school at Oshigambo High School and then moved to Windhoek, where he worked at the South African Broadcasting Corporation (SABC). He also took up writing, and a well-known book, "Kandali nookuume ke", was published.

Nambundunga went into exile in 1974 and received military training at Kongwa, Tanzania, he later was appointed Chief Instructor there, through the ranks of the People's Liberation Army of Namibia (PLAN) during the Namibian War of Independence, occupying various posts until independence. He fought under the nom de guerre "Cosmos".

== Career ==
Upon independence, PLAN and the South West African Territorial Force (SWATF) merged to form the Namibia Defence Force (NDF) and Nambundunga was given the rank of colonel and appointed Director of Logistics, after which he served as Chief of Staff Personnel. Between 1999 and 2000 he was a commissioner on the Joint Military Commission which oversaw the ceasefire and peace process in DRC. In 2000, he was appointed to the rank of Major General and appointed NDF Chief of Staff in the CDF's office. In 2005 he was appointed Namibian Army Commander till he retired in 2011. Between 2009 and January 2011, Nambundunga was Acting Chief of the NDF, while Shalli was suspended on allegations of fraud.

== Honours and decorations ==
- Most distinguished order of Namibia First Class
- Mandume Ya Ndemufayo Operation Medal
- NDF Commendation Medal
- Army Ten Years Service Medal
- Army Twenty Years Service Medal
- Campaign Medal

Military offices
| Preceded by Martin Shalli | Namibian Army Commander; 2005 – 2011 | Succeeded by John Mutwa |
