= Namibian Defence Force =

Combined military forces of Namibia

- NDF Tri-Service Emblem

- NDF Tri-Service Flag
- Founded: 2 June 1990; 36 years ago
- Service branches: Namibian Army; Namibian Navy; Namibian Air Force
- Headquarters: Windhoek, Khomas Region, Namibia
- Website: www.mod.gov.na/ndf

Leadership
- Commander-In-Chief: Netumbo Nandi-Ndaitwah
- Minister of Defence: Frans Kapofi
- Chief of the Defence Force: Air Marshal Martin Pinehas

Personnel
- Military age: 18–25 years
- Conscription: No
- Active personnel: 17,567

Expenditure
- Budget: US$434 million (2024)
- Percent of GDP: 7.0% (2024 estimate)

Industry
- Domestic suppliers: August 26 Group
- Foreign suppliers: Brazil; China; Germany; India; Iran; Italy; Japan; Russia; South Africa; Ukraine; United States

Related articles
- History: Caprivi Conflict; Second Congo War
- Ranks: Military ranks of Namibia

The Namibian Defence Force (NDF) comprises the national military forces of Namibia. It was created when the country, then known as South West Africa, gained independence from apartheid South Africa in 1990. Chapter 15 of the Constitution of Namibia establishes the NDF and defines its role and purpose as, " ... to defend the territory and national interests of Namibia".

Namibia's military was born from the integration of the formerly belligerent People's Liberation Army of Namibia (PLAN), military wing of the South West African People's Organization, and the South West African Territorial Force (SWATF) – a security arm of the former South African administration. The British formulated the force integration plan and began training the NDF, which consisted of five battalions and a small headquarters element. The United Nations Transitional Assistance Group (UNTAG)'s Kenyan infantry battalion remained in Namibia for three months after independence to assist in training the NDF and stabilize the north. Martin Shalli and Charles 'Ho Chi Minh' Namoloh were involved in the negotiations that allowed the Kenyan infantry battalion to remain for that period.

== Purpose ==
The main roles of the Namibian Defence Force are to ensure the sovereignty and territorial integrity of the country by guarding against external aggression, both conventional and unconventional; prevent violation of Namibia's territorial integrity; and assist civil authorities in guarding and protecting government buildings and key installations as provided in the Defence Act.

Defence spending and percentage of GDP included $90 million in 1997/98, 2.6% of GDP. The 73.1 million figure in 2002 was 2.4% of GDP. These figures are almost certainly CIA World Factbook estimates.

== History ==
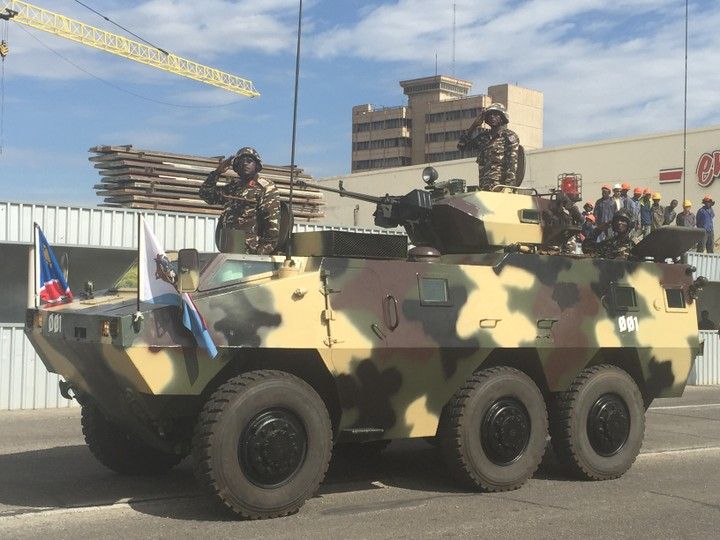
Army W523 APC

Major General A W Dennis, CB, OBE (rtd), British Army, previously Director of Military Assistance Overseas, made the following comments on the initial phase in Namibia at a conference in Pretoria, South Africa on 6 August 1992:

You will no doubt recall that the Angola Accords were signed in Luanda on 22 December 1988. In November 1989 SWAPO won 57% of the votes in the Namibian General Election and immediately requested the help of a British Military Advisory and Training Team following independence on 21 March 1990. The team, initially 55 strong, was duly deployed on 26 March 1990 and the first leader's cadre, for the 1st and 2nd Battalions, was run from 17 April to 2 June. By 1 July, the 1st Battalion, about 1,000 men strong, accompanied by 5 BMATT Advisors, had deployed to the northern border. By November 1990, only four months later, the 5th Battalion had deployed and in early 1991 the 21st Guards Battalion had also been formed, four staff courses had been run, and support weapons and logistics training was well advanced (indeed a logistics battalion deployed as early as July 1990) and an operational test exercise had been conducted. In addition, the Ministry of Defence, a mixture of civilian and military personnel, was operating as a department of state. No one would pretend that everything was working perfectly, nevertheless, a great deal had been achieved in the first year following independence. Most people would probably agree that at some 7,500 strong the Army is unnecessarily large, but sensible plans will need to be made for the employment of any surplus soldiers before they are discharged. Integration has not been easy to achieve, at least in part, because of the need to use several interpreters to cope with the wide variety of languages involved. Battalions are made up of approximately 70% ex-PLAN and 30% ex-SWATF. This mixture could have proved explosive but hounded by their BMATT instructors they united in a common task (or perhaps in the face of a common enemy!) and soon realised that they could work well together. At the higher levels, integration has been more patchy, at least in part because of the departure of most white South African and SWATF officers. But the Government's intentions seem clear in that it decided to split the four MOD directorates evenly, appointing two white and two black (ex-PLAN) directors. In all this, BMATT Namibia has played a role remarkably similar to that of BMATT Zimbabwe.

== Organization and structure ==
The Chief Of Defence Force is the highest-ranking officer and exercises overall executive command of the force.Service chiefs are two-star general officers, air officers and flag officers in command of their respective arms of service. The Departments are also led by Major General's such as the Joint Operations Department. The rest of the general stuff is organised into eight Directorates led by one-star grade general officers, air officers and flag officers.

structure of the Namibian Defence Force

- Chief of Defence Force: Air Marshal Martin Pinehas
  - Army Commander: Major-General Aktofel Nambahu
  - Air Force Commander: Air Vice Marshal Teofilus Shaende
  - Navy Commander: Rear Admiral Sacheus !Gonteb
  - Chief of Staff; Joint Operations: Major-General Joshua Namhindo
    - Chief of Staff; Human Resources: Air Commodore Retoveni Muhenje
    - Chief of Staff; Defence Intelligence:
    - Chief of Staff; Defence Health Services: Brigadier General (Dr) Ndapandula Jacob
    - Chief of Staff; Information & Communication Technology:Brigadier General
    - Chief of Staff; Logistics: Brigadier General
    - Chief of Staff; Defence Inspector General: Brigadier General
    - Chief of Staff; Policy and Plans: Brigadier General Fillimon Shafashike:

=== Chief of Defence Force ===
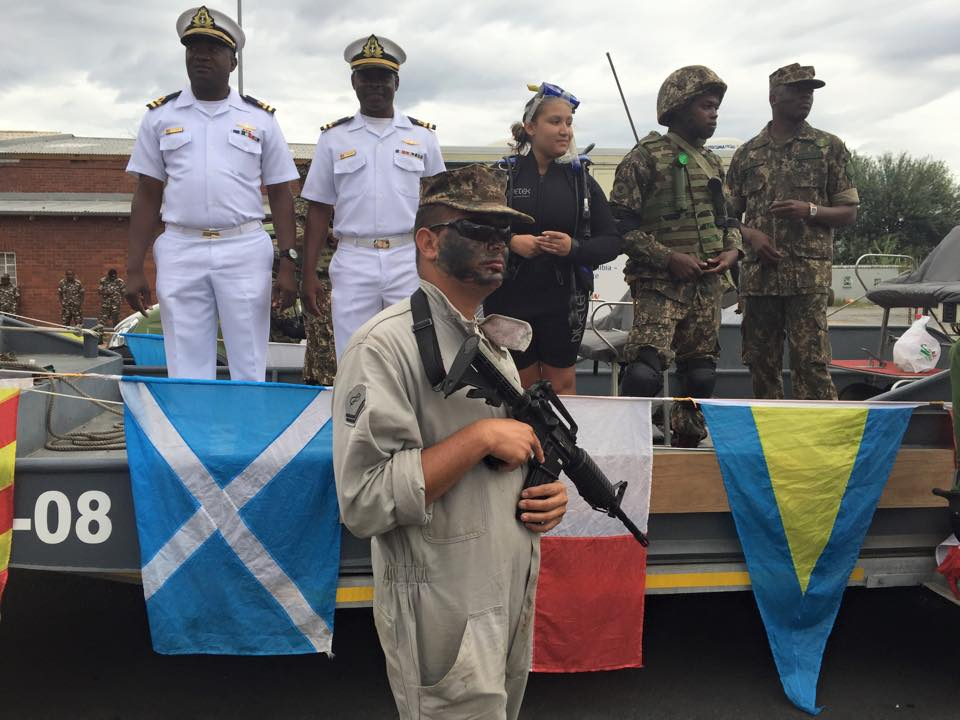
Navy servicemen and servicewoman

The Chief of the Defence Force (Namibia) is always a commissioned three star General/Air/Flag Officer from the officer corps. The first chief of the NDF was Lieutenant-General Dimo Hamaambo. He was previously the leader of PLAN. Lieutenant-General Solomon Hawala replaced Hamaambo as Chief of the NDF on Hamaambo's retirement. After Lieutenant-General Hawala retired in October 2006, Lieutenant General Martin Shalli then headed the NDF.

President Hifikepunye Pohamba suspended Lieutenant-General Shalli from his post as Chief of Defence Force in 2009 over corruption allegations, dating back to the time when Shalli served as Namibia's High Commissioner to Zambia. During the time of the suspension, Army Commander Major General Peter Nambundunga acted as Chief. Shalli eventually retired in January 2011.Lieutenant General Epaphras Denga Ndaitwah was then appointed as Chief of the NDF. Lieutenant Gen Ndaitwah served until 31 December 2013 upon his retirement he was succeeded by Lieutenant Gen John Mutwa.

Chiefs of Defence Force
| Period | Rank | Name | Arm of Service |
|---|---|---|---|
| 1990–2000 | Lieutenant-General | Dimo Hamaambo | Namibian Army |
| 2000–2006 | Lieutenant-General | Solomon Huwala | Namibian Army |
| 2006–2011 | Lieutenant-General | Martin Shalli | Namibian Army |
| 2011–2013 | Lieutenant-General | Epaphras Denga Ndaitwah | Namibian Army |
| 2013–2020 | Lieutenant-General | John Mutwa | Namibian Army |
| 2020 – Incumbent | Air Marshal | Martin Pinehas | Namibian Air Force |

=== NDF Sergeant Major ===
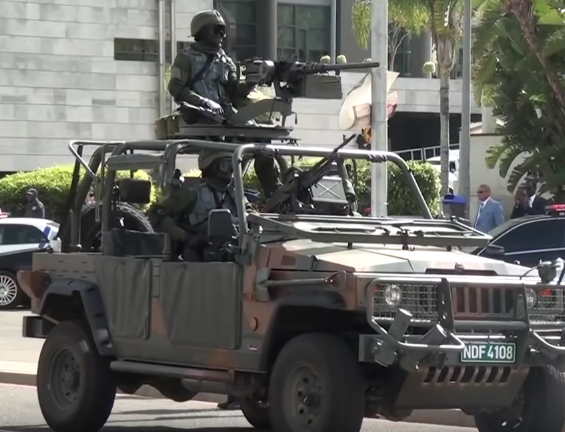
Special Forces on a drive past

NDF Sergeant Major is the highest appointment a Non-Commissioned Officer may receive. Duties of the NDF Sergeant Major include making sure that discipline, drills, dressing code, performance standards, and morale of the non-commissioned officers are maintained.

Previous Sergeant Majors are:

- 1990–1997 WO1 retired K. Lossen, Namibian Army
- 1997–2000 Late WO1 retired A.H. Vatileni, Namibian Army
- 2000–2007 WO1 retired E.K. Mutota, Namibian Army
- 2007–2011 WO1 retired D.J. Angolo, Namibian Navy
- 2011–2017 WO1 retired Isak Nankela, Namibian Air Force
- 2017–2018 WO1 Albert Siyaya, Namibian Air Force
- 2018–2019 WO1 Leonard Iiyambo, Namibian Army
- 2019– Incumbent WO1 Joseph Nembungu, Namibian Air Force

=== Joint Operations Directorate ===
The Joint Operations Directorate is the only directorate headed by a two-star Flag/Air/General Officer. Its role is to coordinate and conduct combined Operations and implement plans and doctrines in the force. The first Director of Operation in 1990 was Brigadier General Martin Shalli.

=== Defence Health Services ===
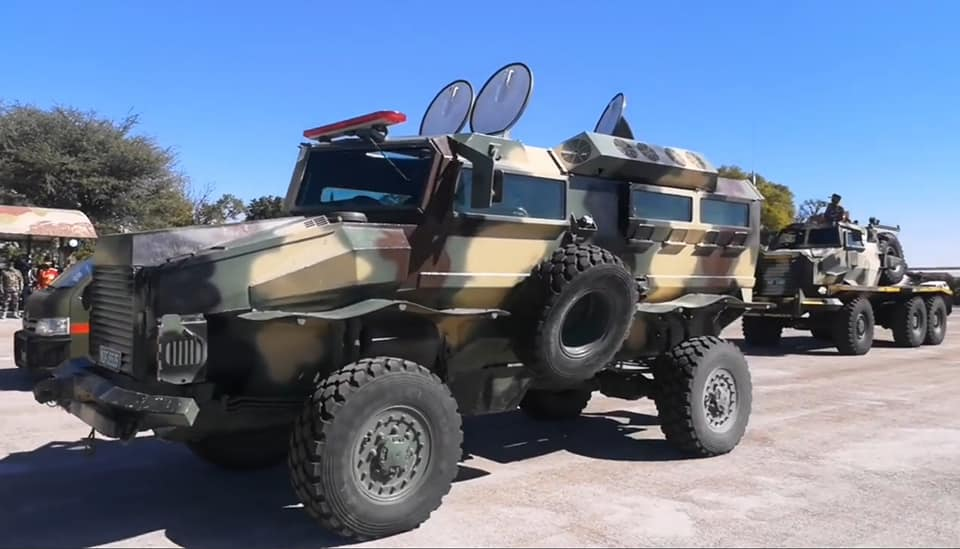
Wer'Wolf Ambulance

The Force's Defence Health Services provides medical services to service personnel, it operates sick bays at all bases and units as well the military hospitals.

=== Logistics Directorate ===
The Logistics Directorate is responsible for supplying material to the force. The first Director for Logistics was Colonel Peter Nambundunga.

=== Defence Inspectorate ===
The Defence Inspector General's Directorate is responsible for maintaining the efficiency and effectiveness of the Force. It also investigates both internal and external complaints.

=== Namibian Defence Force ranks ===
NDF ranks are based on the Commonwealth rank structure. There is no approved four-star general rank in the NDF. The Chief of Defence Force is a singular appointment that comes with an elevation to the rank of lieutenant general for an Army officer, air marshal for an Air Force officer and vice admiral for a Navy officer. Arms of services commanders i.e. Army, Air Force and Navy commanders, have the rank of major general, air vice marshal and rear admiral. The rank of brigadier has also been transformed into brigadier general. Directorate heads are always brigadier generals, i.e. the Chief of Staff for Defence Intelligence.

== Army ==
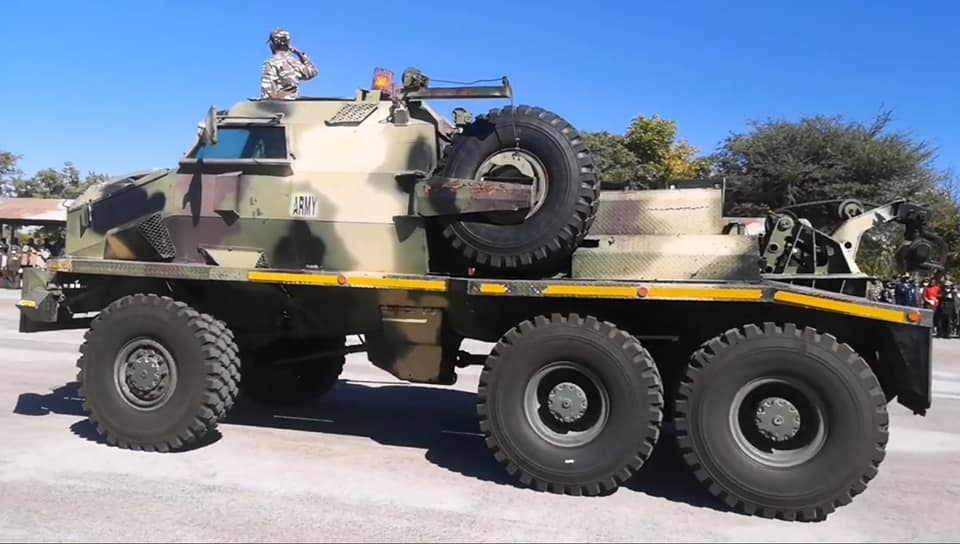
Wolf 6X6 Recovery Vehicle

The Landward Arm of service for the Defence force is the Namibian Army, it is also the largest of the NDF's service branches.

== Air Force ==
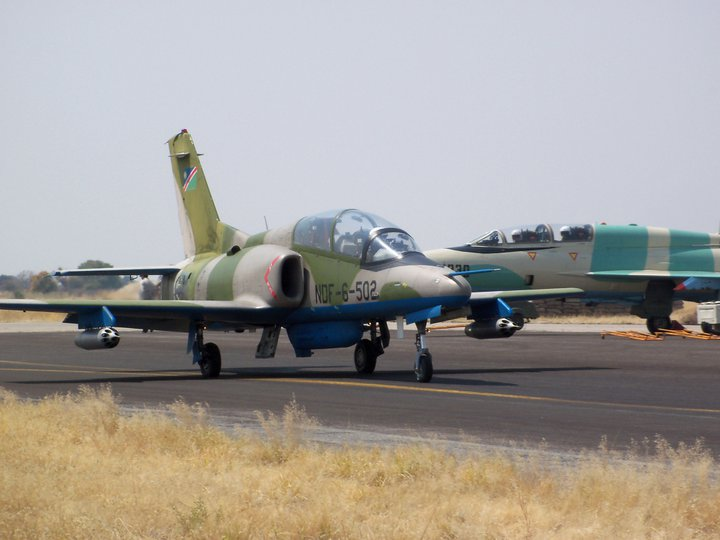
Air Force K-8

The Aerial Warfare branch is small but was bolstered with deliveries of some fighter jets in 2006 and 2008.

== Navy ==
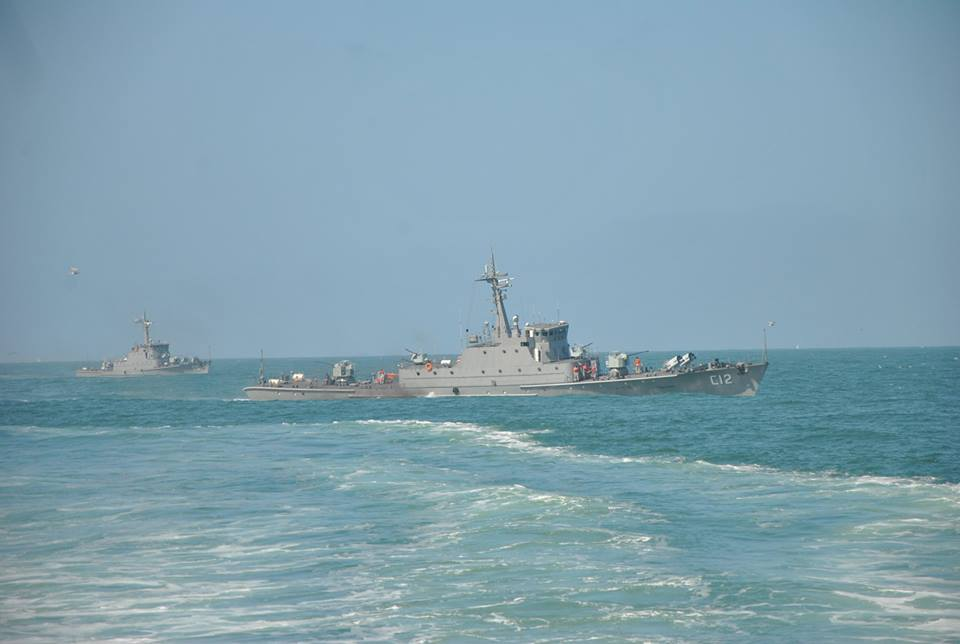
Navy Type 037 Boats

Development of the Maritime Warfare Branch has been slow, and the force was only formally established in 2004, 14 years after independence. Today, it numbers over 1100 personnel and deploys a small number of lightly armed patrol vessels. Extensive Brazilian aid assisted in its development.

== Joint Headquarters ==
The Joint Headquarters is an Arm of Service level institution in the Defence Force and is created by the Minister of Defence in terms of section 13 of the Defence Act.

== Training institutions ==
=== Army Battle School ===
Situated at the Oshivelo Army base, the school offers units and battle groups to test their combat fighting skills in conventional and non-conventional warfare.

=== Army Technical Training Centre ===
Established in 2011 the technical centre imparts students with knowledge repair and maintaining army systems and installations. The centre was commissioned on 27 February 2015.

=== Namibian Defence Force Training Establishment ===
The Namibian Defence Force Training Establishment is the main training and academic unit of the Namibian Defence Force.It consist of 7 Schools offering training in different fields including Medical, Signals, Logistics,Intelligence amongst others. Training and teaching in the institution ranges from Basic Military Training to Vocational training.

=== Namibia Command and Staff College ===
The Namibia Command and Staff College offers the Junior Staff Course (JSC) and the Senior Command and Staff Course (SCSC). It provides staff training to prepare students for staff appointments.

=== Parachute Training School ===
The force's parachute airborne school is based at the Grootfontein Air Force Base. Here students from all service branches are training to qualify as Parachute specialists. The school was set up with help from the South African private military parachute training company Chute Systems which provided training to Namibia's airborne forces and associated staff e.g. parachute riggers.

=== Naval Training School ===
Established on 22 November 2009, the Naval Training School was commissioned by President Hage Geingob on 22 July 2016. It is administratively divided into two sections, the Sailors Training Wing and the Marine Training Wing.

=== School of Air Power Studies ===
The School of Air Power Studies is run in conjunction with the Namibia Aviation Training Academy, which trains pilots and technicians.

=== School of Military Science ===
The School of Military Science, run in conjunction with the University of Namibia, offers officers in the Defence force qualifications ranging from Bachelor of Science Honors degrees in the field of nautical, Army and Aeronautical, to a post-graduate diploma in Security and Strategic studies, and a Master of Arts in Security and Strategic Studies (MA-SSS).

== Gallery ==
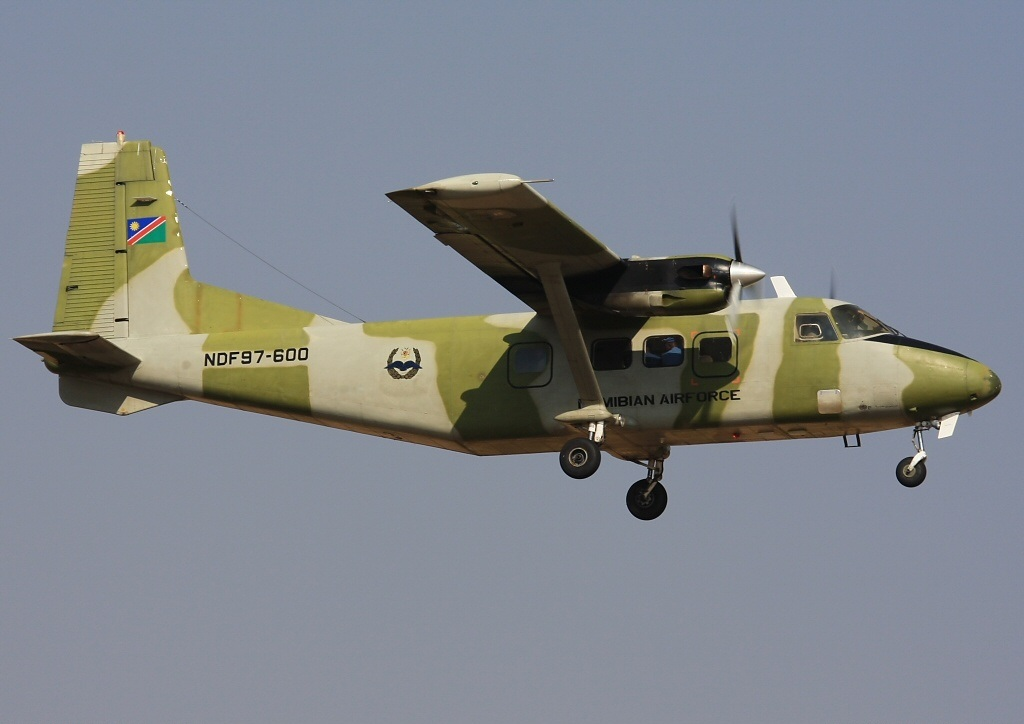
Harbin Y-12

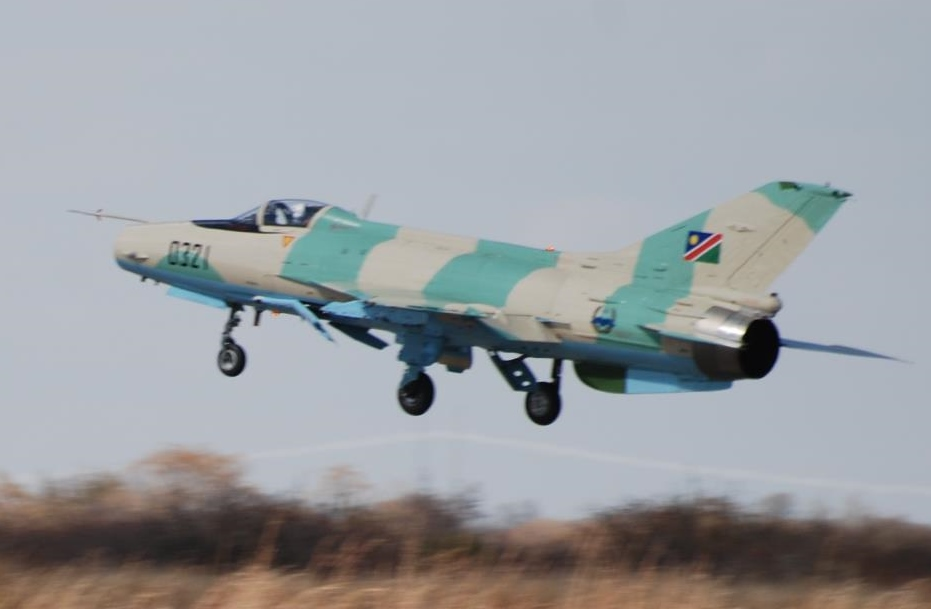
F-7 Fighter Jet

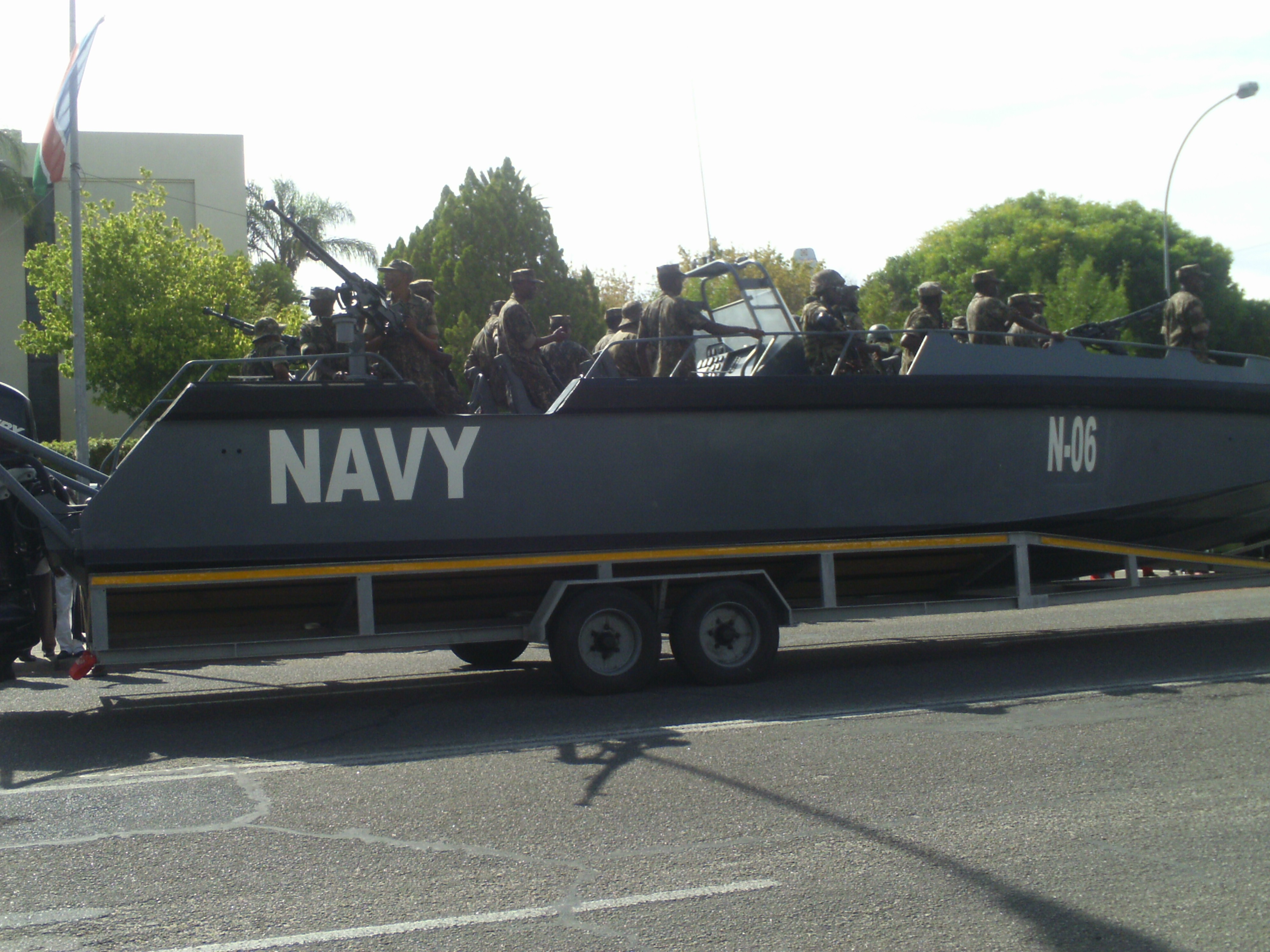
Marines on an interceptor

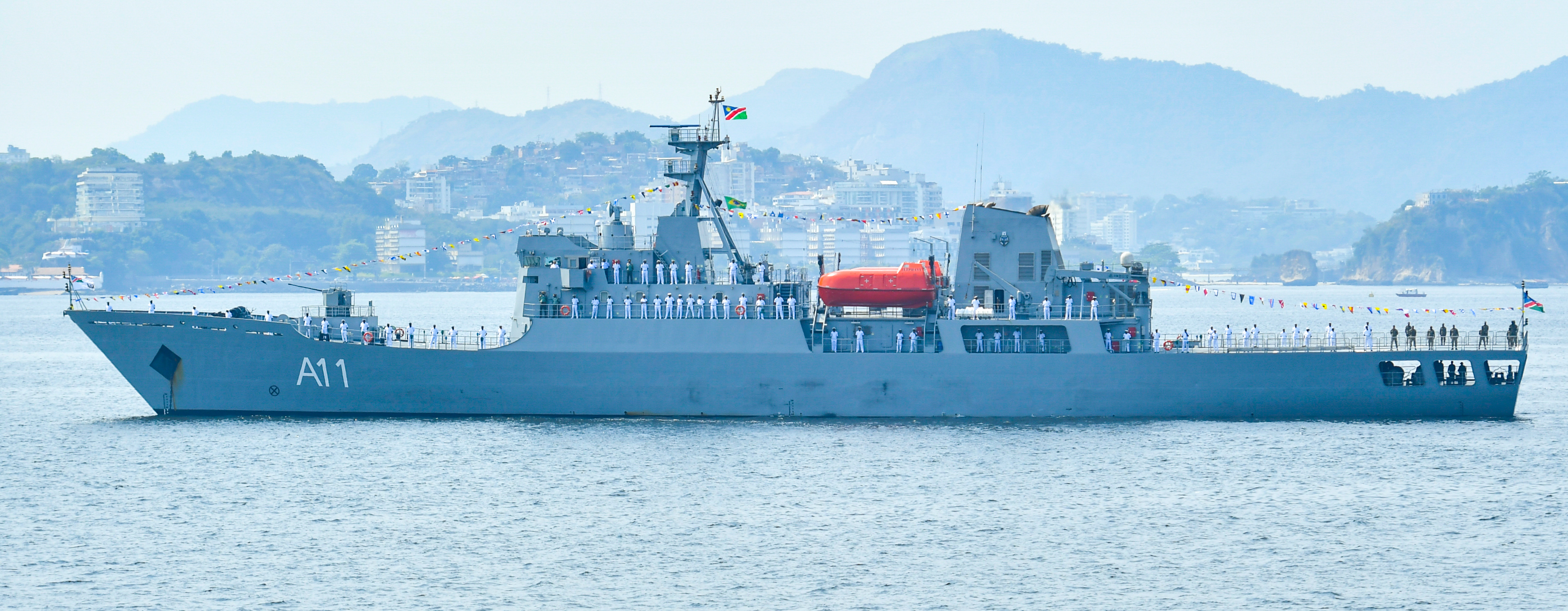
NS Elephant

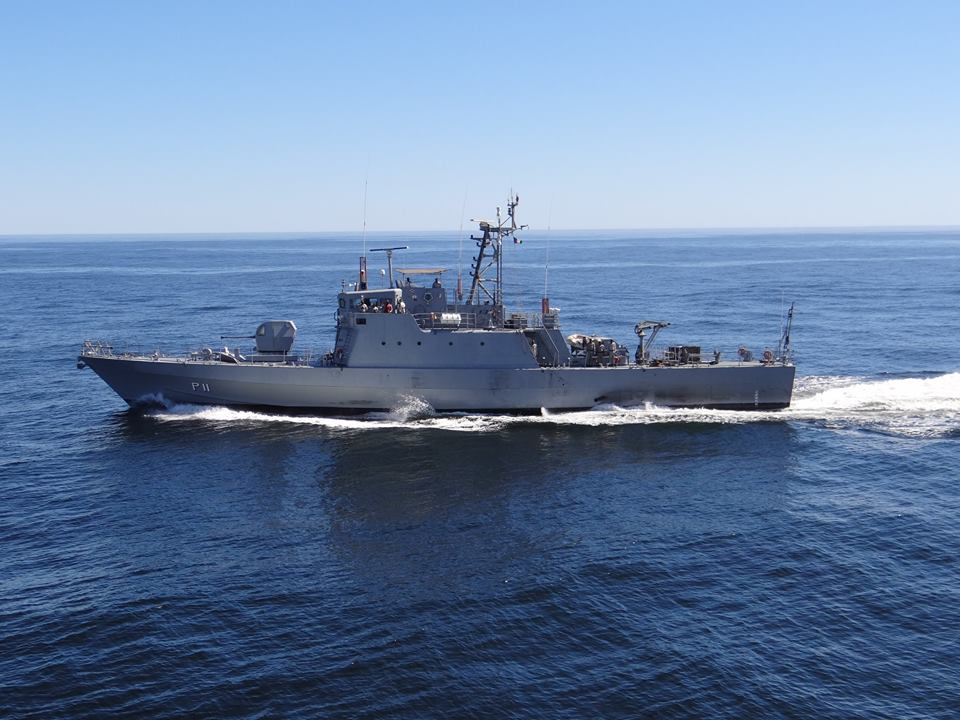
NS Brendan Simbwaye

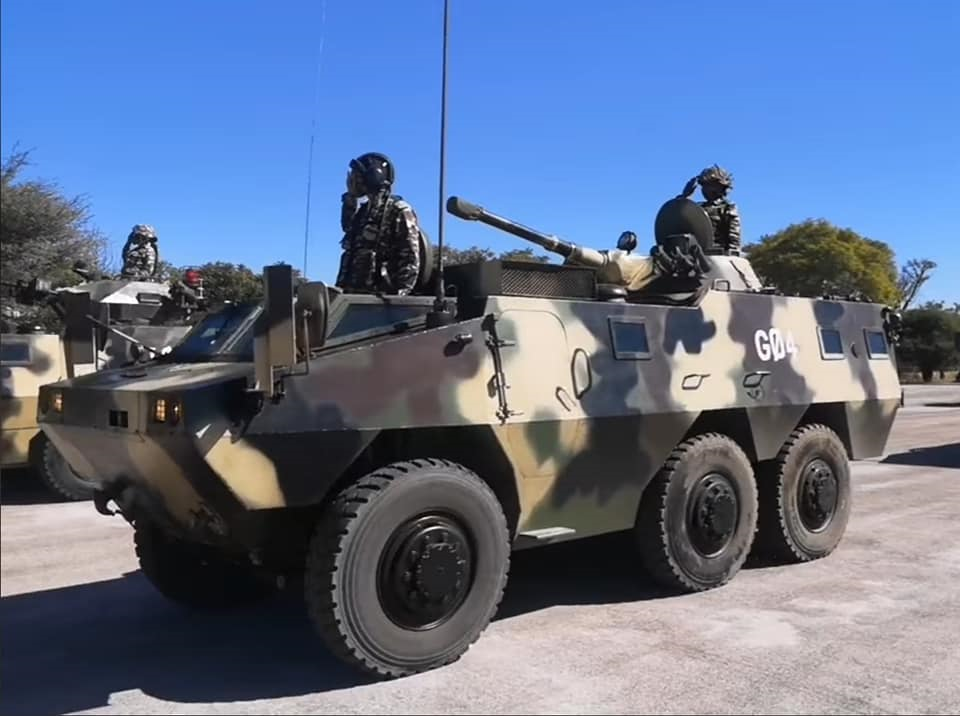
Army WZ-523 IFV

== See also ==
- List of Namibian generals
- List of Namibian admirals
- List of Namibian Air Officers
