= Black beret =

Military cap, worn by armored forces and other units

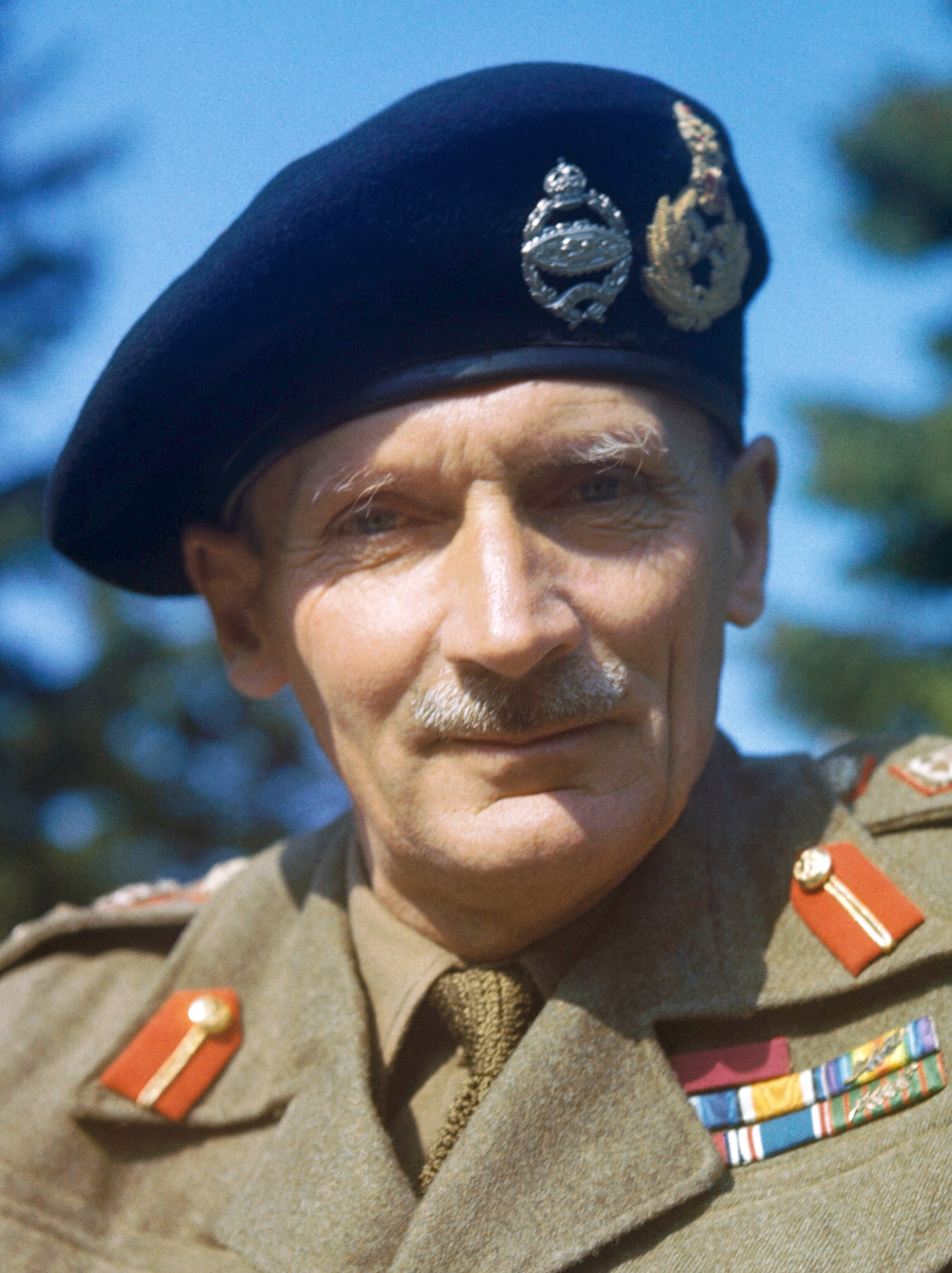
Field Marshal Montgomery wearing a black beret (initially a gift from a subordinate in the Royal Tank Regiment)

The black beret is a coloured beret, commonly worn by paramilitaries and militaries around the world, particularly armored forces such as the British Army's Royal Tank Regiment (RTR), the Royal Canadian Armoured Corps (RCAC), and Royal Australian Armoured Corps (RAAC) and the Indian Army Armoured Corps.

Notable non-armored military units to wear the black beret include the non-military police and non-special forces elements of the Irish Defence Forces, Russian Naval Infantry (and formerly Soviet) and Russian OMON units, the majority of the United States Army, and United States Air Force (USAF) Tactical Air Control Parties (TACPs).

== History ==
The usage of black berets by militaries dates to World War I. During the war, the French Army's Chasseurs Alpins wore large black berets as a forage cap. In 1918, near the end of the war, British Army officers Hugh Elles and J. F. C. Fuller decided to outfit members of the Royal Tank Corps with black berets as the colour was least likely to show oil stains. The decision was approved by King George V on 5 March 1924, and black berets were used exclusively within the British Armed Forces as the headdress of the Royal Tank Corps during the interwar period and World War II. When uniforms were issued to the Royal Observer Corps (ROC), there was a surplus of Royal Armoured Corps black berets which were given to the ROC.

== Usage by country ==
=== Non-state actors ===
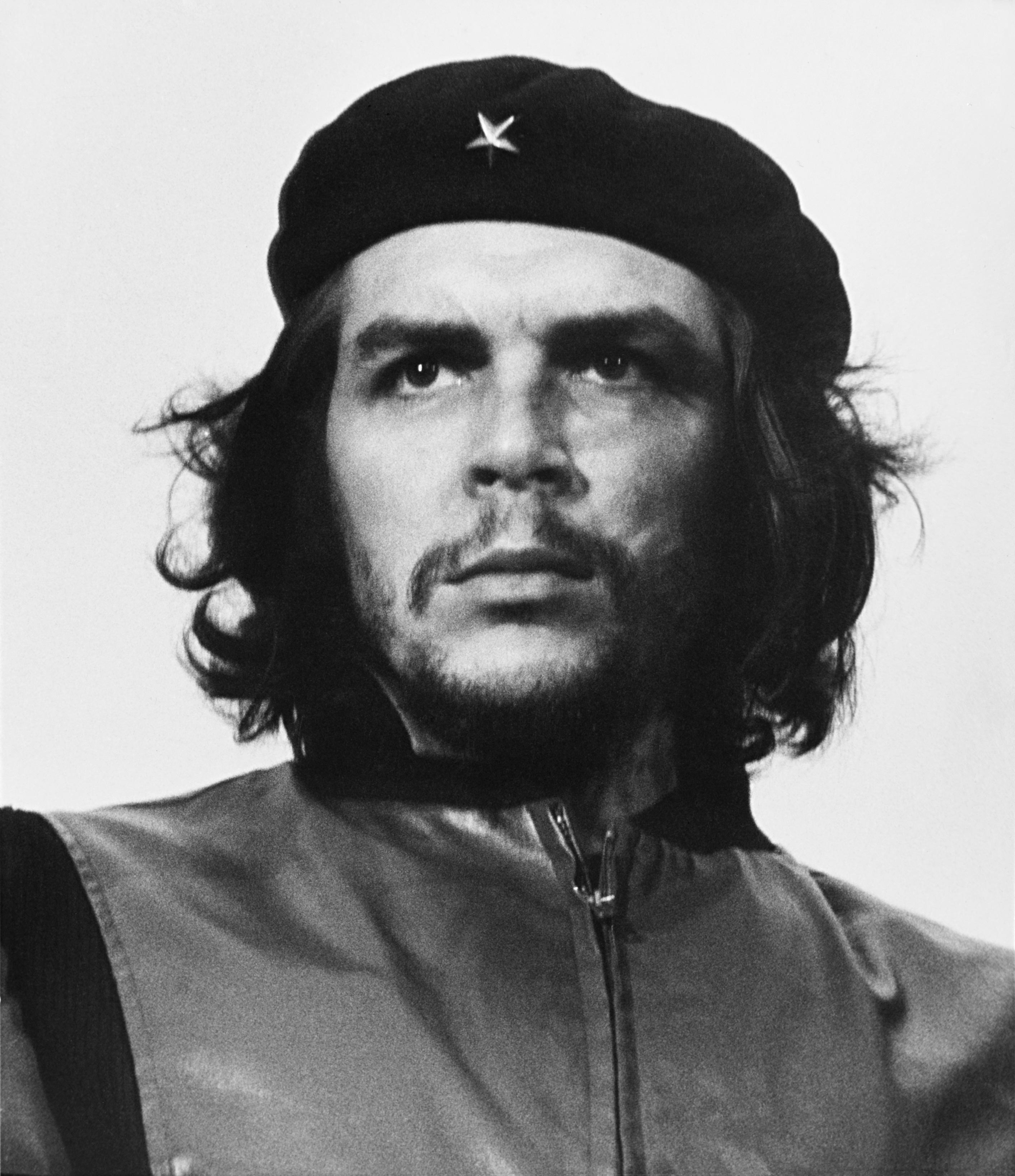
Che Guevara wearing his iconic black beret

One of the most famous photographs of Che Guevara taken by Alberto Korda was of him wearing a black beret with a gold star. Fidel Castro also wore a black beret during the revolution against the Batista government of Cuba. In the 1960s several activist groups adopted the beret.

- The Black Panther Party, of the United States formed in 1966, wore black berets.
- A similar Black Power organisation in Bermuda was named the Black Beret Cadre in 1969. Two men with links to the group later assassinated Governor of Bermuda Richard Sharples.
- Chicano activists wore the black beret in the 1960s and 70s (in homage to Che Guevara) as a symbol of militancy and organized the Black Berets por La Justicia throughout California and the Southwestern United States.
- Irish National Liberation Army members wore a black beret.
- Patriotic League of the Republic of Bosnia and Herzegovina members typically wore black berets (among other colours) that were common among the older Bosniak male population, usually with the Ljiljani coat of arms stitched on the front of the beret. It was also common among other Bosniak paramilitary forces during the Bosnian War.
- Provisional Irish Republican Army members wore a black beret.
- ETA wore black berets over hoods in public appearances.
- THRUSH troops on The Man from UNCLE wore black berets.
- Since August 2017, the Knights of Columbus Fourth Degree members are now wearing black berets as part of their new uniform.

=== Argentina ===
The Argentine Navy's Batallón de Infantería de Marina 5 (5th Marine Battalion), of Falklands War Mount Tumbledown fame (1982), wears a black beret. This was introduced by (then) Commander Manuel Tomé around 1977, and the beret was awarded on completion of a Cold Weather and Mountain Warfare Course. Today, all units of the Southern Marine Force of the Argentine Marine Corps wear black berets with unit badges.

=== Australia ===
In the Australian Army, All RAAC Units (Royal Australian Armoured Corps), wear the black beret.

=== Austria ===
In the Austrian Bundesheer all armored units (Armored Battalions, Mechanized Infantry Battalions, Artillery Battalions and Mechanized Headquarter Battalions), wear the black beret.

=== Azerbaijan ===
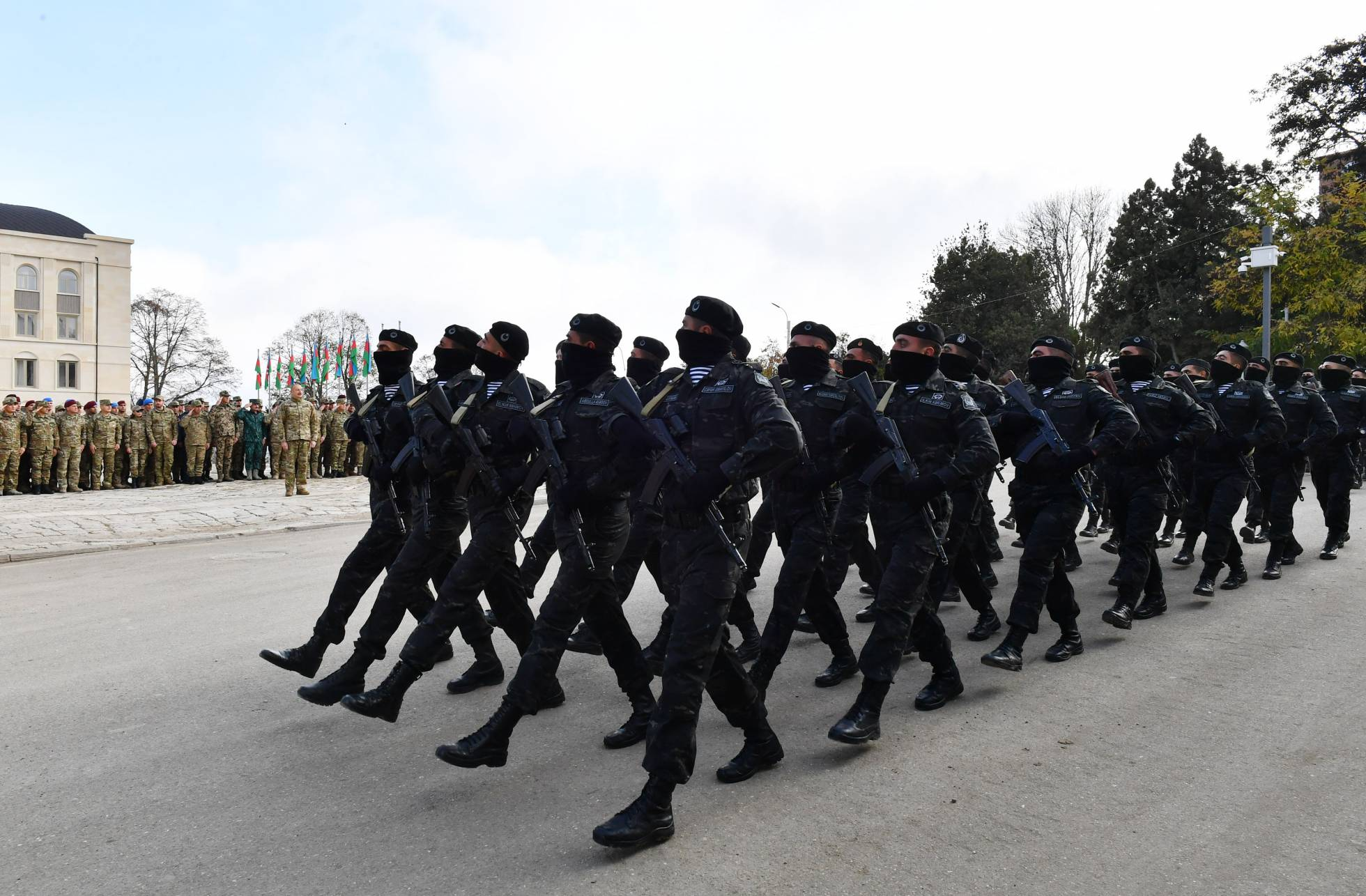
Unit of underwater offence of Azerbaijani Navy with black beret

In the Azerbaijani Armed Forces armored units of underwater offence of Azerbaijani Navy wear the black beret.

=== Bangladesh ===
In the Bangladesh Army, all units of the Armoured, Cavalry and Lancer Corps wear black berets.the Rapid Action Battalion of Bangladesh Police also uses black beret.

=== Belgium ===
In the Belgian Army, the black beret is worn by cavalry and engineer units.

=== Brazil ===
The Brazilian armour and mechanized troops also wear the black beret, as well as the special forces unit of the Military Police of Rio de Janeiro, Batalhão de Operações Policiais Especiais (BOPE).

In the Brazilian auxiliary military forces of the Polícia Militar (Military Police), specially in Minas Gerais state, officers sometimes wears black berets as official parts of patrol gear.

=== Canada ===
In the Canadian Armed Forces, black berets are worn by Royal Canadian Armoured Corps soldiers and by all sailors (except military police and special operations sailors).

=== Chile ===
In the Chilean Army, the black beret is worn by the paras and the special forces.

=== Croatia ===
In the Croatian Army black berets are worn by military police units, 1st Mechanized Battalion and the Cadet Battalion.

=== Cuba ===
Special unit of the police.

=== Cyprus ===
In the Cypriot National Guard, the black beret is exclusively given to soldiers of the Armoured Forces and to Officers of the same branch after graduating from the Greek Armoured Forces officers' school. The school is considered the toughest academy of the Greek Army, bar special forces, and therefore the black beret is considered an honour for the bearer.

=== Czech Republic ===
In the Czech Army, military policemen wear black berets.

=== Denmark ===
In the Danish Army, the black beret was originally used by all combat regiments, but now it is worn by the Jutland Dragoons, Guard Hussars, Royal Life Guard, Schleswig Foot Regiment and Danish Artillery Regiment.

=== Estonia ===
Since 2013 the professional soldiers of the Estonian Navy wear the black berets.

=== Finland ===
Only members of the Armored Brigade wear black berets.

=== France ===
In the French Army, the black beret is worn by the 501e Régiment de Chars de Combat and by the 16e Bataillon de Chasseurs à Pied.

=== Germany ===
In the German Army, an oversized black beret was introduced during the National Socialist era for tank crews, to be worn over the crash helmet; however this was dropped in favour of a black garrison cap during World War II. Today the black beret (of conventional size) is worn by the Armoured Corps and the Armoured Reconnaissance Corps.

=== Greece ===
In the Greek Army, black berets are worn by the Panzer (Armored Vehicles) branch, tracing back to the tradition of the original cavalry units.

=== India ===
In the Indian Army, all Cavalry and Armoured Corps, National Security Guards & Border Security Force wear black berets.

=== Indonesia ===
In the Indonesian Army, black beret is worn by the members of Cavalry Corps (except cavalry battalions under Kostrad strategic reserve command which wearing dark green beret universal to all of its soldiers).

In the Indonesian Navy, members of the Submarine Corps wear black berets.

=== Iraq ===
In the pre-2003 Iraqi Army, the black beret was the most commonly worn headgear and continues to be worn by both army and police personnel of the post-2003 Iraqi Army.

=== Ireland ===
In the Irish Army the majority of the members of the Permanent Defence Forces, specifically the infantry, wear black berets except for certain combat support units such as MPs, Cavalry etc.

=== Israel ===
In the Israel Defense Forces, soldiers serving in the Armor Corps wear black berets.

=== Italy ===
In the Italian Army most units wear a black beret. Exceptions are: Paratroopers, Alpini, Army Aviation Corps (AVES), Lagunari and Bersaglieri.

=== Luxembourg ===
The black beret is worn by all soldiers in the Luxembourg Army.

=== Lithuania ===
The black beret is worn by Juozas Vitkus Engineer battalion soldiers in the Lithuanian Armed Forces.

=== Malaysia ===
In the Malaysian Army, the members of the Royal Armor Corps wear the black berets.

=== Namibia ===
In the Namibian Army, the black beret is worn by members from Artillery Brigade, Engineer Regiment, Signal Regiment, Logistic Support Battalion, Air Defence Brigade, the Namibian Air Force and Namibian Navy also wear the black beret

=== Nigeria ===
In the Nigerian Air Force , the black beret is worn by Nigerian airforce regiment and Navy personnel

=== Netherlands ===
In the Dutch Army, the black beret is worn by cavalry battalions.

=== New Zealand ===
In the New Zealand Police, members of the Armed Offenders Squad wore the black beret.

=== Norway ===
The Norwegian Army Panserbataljonen (armoured) and other cavalry units wear black berets.

=== Philippines ===
In the Philippine Army, the members of the 1st Scout Ranger Regiment, Presidential Security Group and Tank Officers from the Philippine Army Light Armor Division

In the Philippine Air Force, members of the Special Operations Wing wears black berets.

In the Philippine National Police, members of the Special Action Force wears black berets.

In the Metropolitan Manila Development Authority, members of the Traffic Enforcers wears black berets.

=== Pakistan ===
In the Pakistan Army, the Armoured Corps wears black berets as well as special forces.

=== Poland ===
In the Polish Armed Forces, the black berets are worn by armored units of Polish Army, and by Polish Navy.

=== Portugal ===
In the Portuguese Army, the black beret is worn by the cavalry branch, including the armoured troops and the military police. The black beret is also worn by several Portuguese civil forces, like the Bomb disposal unit of the Public Security Police, the Prison Guard Corps and the Civil Defense.

=== Russia ===
Both the Russian Naval Infantry and OMON special police wears the black beret with its dress and field uniforms, when not wearing helmets.

=== Serbia ===
Members of the Serbian military police wear black berets.

=== Singapore ===
The black beret is worn by the Armour formation of the Singapore Armed Forces (SAF).

=== Spain ===
Traditionally in the Spanish Armed Forces black berets were used to denote paratroopers units. The custom originating in the Spanish Air Force, although it is now used also by other non-paratroopers units in the Army and the Air Force.

In the Spanish Army, the black beret is worn by the Mechanized Brigades and the Parachutist Brigade BRIPAC.

In the Spanish Air Force, the black beret is worn by the paratroopers units, the Air Deployment Support Squads EADA and SEADA, as well as by Air Force Police Units. The special operations unit EZAPAC used to wear the black beret until 1997 that was change to a Green Beret, to denote their Special Forces specialization.

=== Somalia ===
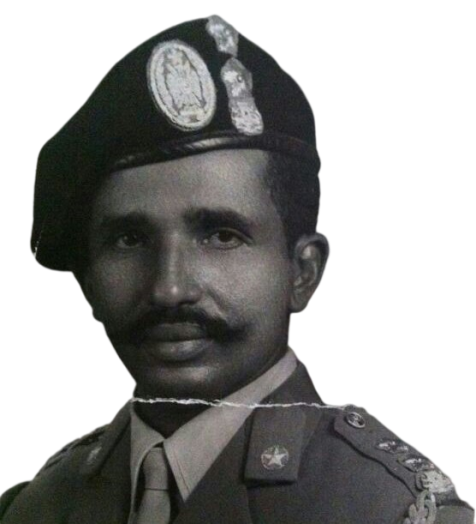
Major General Omar Haji Masalle, an Armoured battalion commander wearing his black beret

In the Somali Army, members of the Armoured Battalions and the Army's rear wear a black beret, inherited from British military tradition.

In the Somali Navy, the black beret is the standard issue headgear.

=== South Africa ===
In the South African Army, members of the South African Armour Corps, the South African Intelligence Corps, Defence Intelligence Division and the Technical Service Corps wear the black beret, each with their respective corps badge.

Members of the South African Navy Maritime Reaction Squadron also wear the black beret.

=== South Korea ===
In the South Korean army, black berets are worn by South Korean army special operations forces.

=== Sri Lanka ===
In the Sri Lankan Army, the Armoured Corps, Mechanized Infantry and the Special Forces wear black berets.

In the Sri Lankan Navy, the black beret is worn by the Members of the elite Special Boat Squadron.

=== Sweden ===
In the Swedish Army, all armour and mechanized units wear black berets.

=== Switzerland ===
In the Swiss Army, black berets are worn by Tank Branch, Pioneers, Rescue Troops, Communication and Command Troops, high command, Tank Grenadiers, Chaplains, armed forces legal service and other troops.

=== Turkey ===
In the Turkish Land Forces, the black berets are worn by armor personnel.

=== United States ===
In the United States military, the beret was unofficially worn by a variety of special operations units during and following World War II. In the spring of 1951, the 10th and 11th Ranger Companies wore black berets during their training at Camp Carson, Colorado, before their deployment to Japan.

==== U.S. Army ====
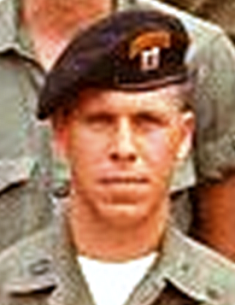
Ranger School class commander wearing black beret with his Ranger Tab and rank insignia (1971)

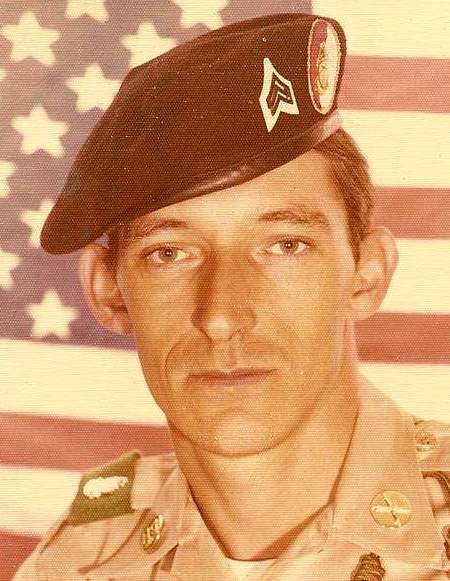
Artillery NCO with 11th Armored Cavalry wearing black beret with Armored Cavalry Oval, DUI, and rank insignia (c. 1970s)

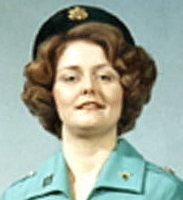
Army Medical Corps officer wearing black female beret with Officer Cap Device (c. 1975)

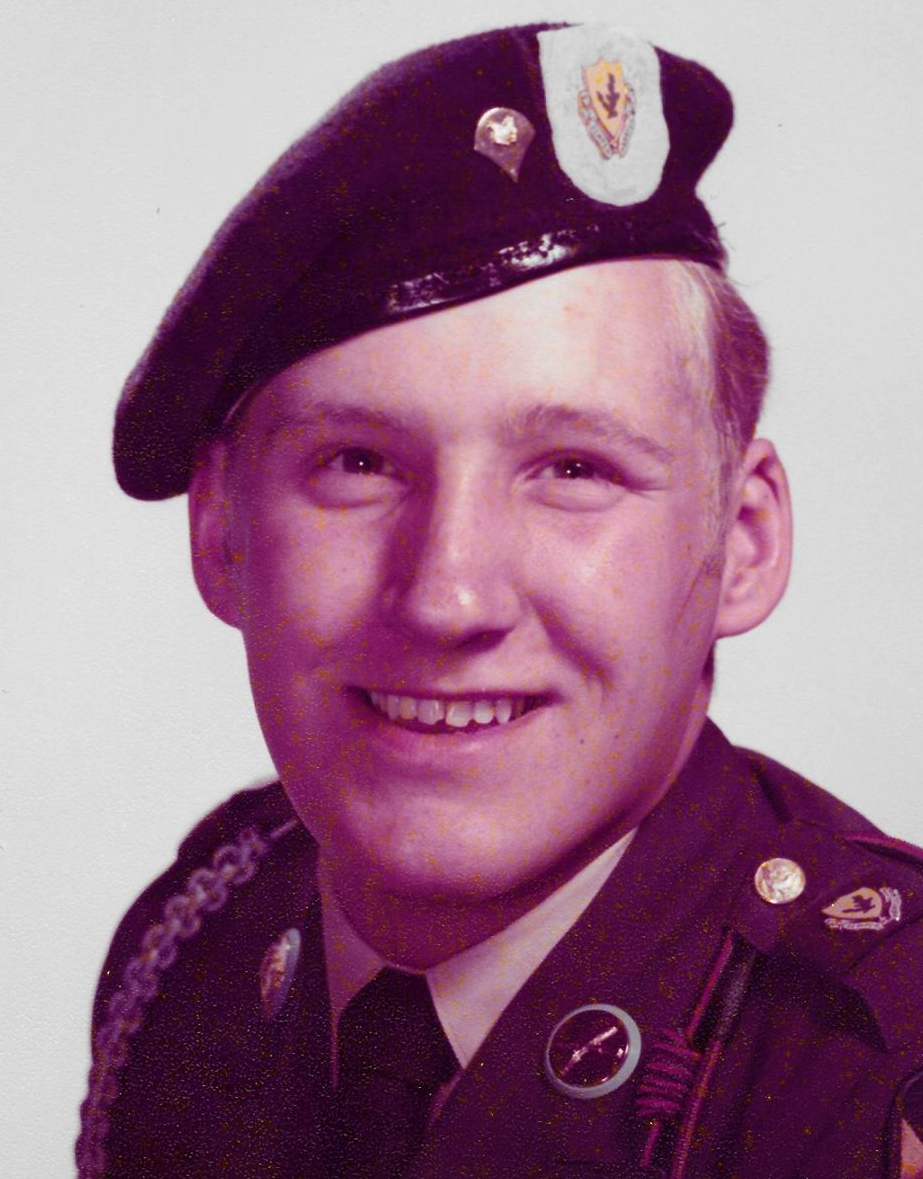
Infantryman with 1st Bn, 12th Cavalry, 1st Cavalry Div wearing black beret with Bn beret flash, DUI, and rank insignia (1976)

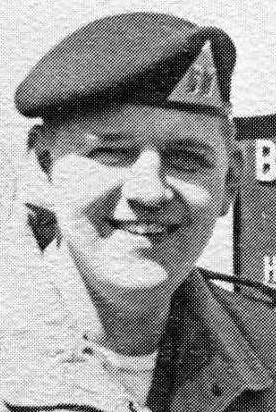
Armor officer with the Armor School wearing black beret with Armor School Instructor Flash and rank insignia (1976)

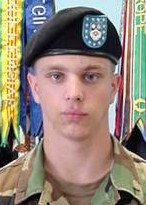
Soldier from 23rd Infantry wearing black beret with Department of the Army Beret Flash and DUI (c. 2001)

In 1973, permission was granted to local commanders to encourage distinctive, morale-enhancing uniform items and the black beret was adopted by armor and armored cavalry units in the United States.

A black beret was authorized for wear by female soldiers in 1975.

On January 30, 1975, it was officially assigned as part of the newly created battalions of United States Army Rangers who had worn it unofficially during the Vietnam War.

In 1979, the U.S. Army Chief of Staff ruled that the black beret was restricted to just ranger and airborne units (the latter receiving their distinctive maroon berets on November 28, 1980). However, since June 14, 2001, the black beret is worn by all United States Army troops unless the soldier is approved to wear a different distinctive beret. The Rangers now wear tan berets, alluding to the buckskins worn by Rogers' Rangers during the French and Indian War.

The black beret is worn as part of the Army Service Uniform (ASU), the U.S. Army's dress uniform. It also became the official garrison headgear to be worn with the Battle Dress Uniform (BDUs) in 2001, and from 2005 the Army Combat Uniform (ACU). The change was implemented by General Eric Shinseki, Army Chief of Staff at the time, who stated that it was about promoting "...our values as an institution." From the beginning, the beret was unpopular with soldiers because the headgear required two hands to put it on, provided no shade from the sun (unlike the patrol cap), had to be shaved and shaped upon acquisition and, as black wool, was hot and uncomfortable in warm weather. When worn improperly, the beret prompted several nicknames for the resulting look, such as "the Cyclops", "the Pirate", or "the Princess."

Despite years of negative feedback, the beret remained part of the ACU until 2011, when incoming Sergeant Major of the Army Raymond F. Chandler made it his first order of business to address the wishes "thousands of soldiers" who wanted the army to end the wear of the beret with the ACU, and the army subsequently did just that. The black beret remained the headgear for the ASU, but was replaced as the default headgear with the ACU patrol cap.

==== U.S. Air Force ====
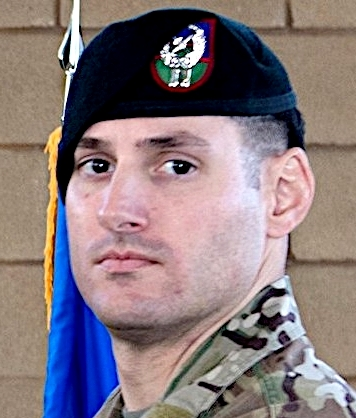
Air Force TACP officer wearing black beret with TACP beret flash, crest, and miniature rank insignia (2019)

In 1979, the black beret was authorized for wear by enlisted personnel in the Tactical Air Control Party (TACP). In 1984, two airmen from Pope Air Force Base, North Carolina submitted the current flash and badge design. It was approved for all TACP airmen in 1985. TACP specialists (AFSC 1C4X1) are currently the only United States Air Force specialty allowed to wear the coveted black beret as part of their daily duty uniform wear.

==== U.S. Navy ====
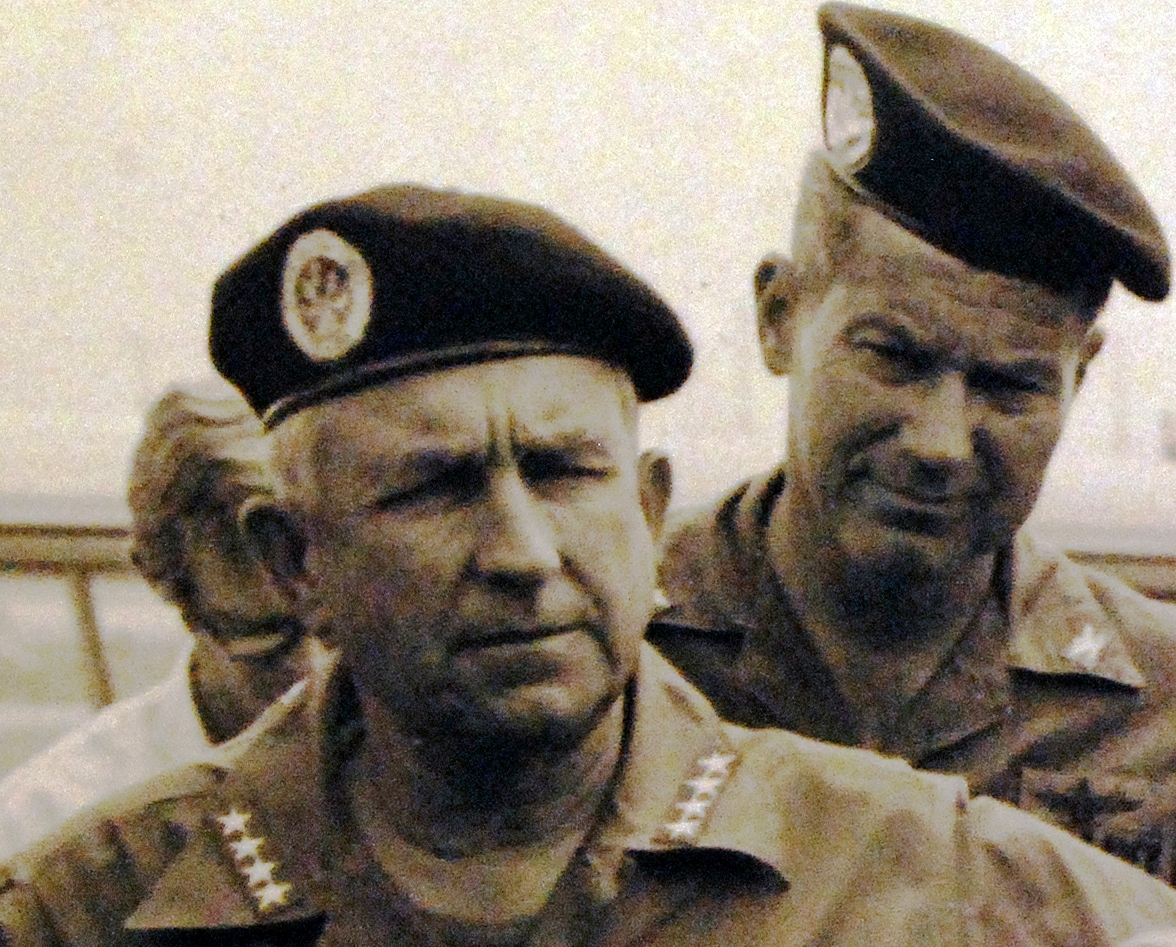
CNO and COMRIVPATFOR wearing black berets with the River Patrol Force TF-116 patch (1969)

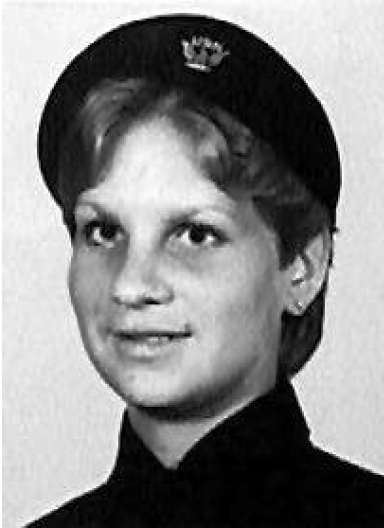
U.S. sailor wearing female black beret with Navy enlisted cap insignia (c. 1998)

During the Vietnam War U.S. Navy personnel assigned to patrol boats and members of Inshore Undersea Warfare Group 1, WESTPAC Division wore the South Vietnamese navy black beret with badge. Unlike the U.S. Navy SEAL teams, the beret was authorized for wear In Country only. Unit tradition had the back ribbon cut into two pennants after first contact with the enemy with the ends of the pennant notched in a "V" to signify he had made an enemy "kill".

Until October 2016, a black beret was authorized to be worn in the U.S. Navy, albeit solely by female sailors of all pay-grades. Female commissioned officers wore the U.S. Navy officer crest on the beret above the left eyebrow, female petty officers and seamen wore the combination cover's device, and female chief petty officers wore their rate insignia instead. The female black beret's usage was discontinued along with the officer's tiara by the navy in 2016 as part of a naval effort to reduce the number of uniform items, make them appear more unisex, and also due to a lack of widespread use.

=== Ukraine ===
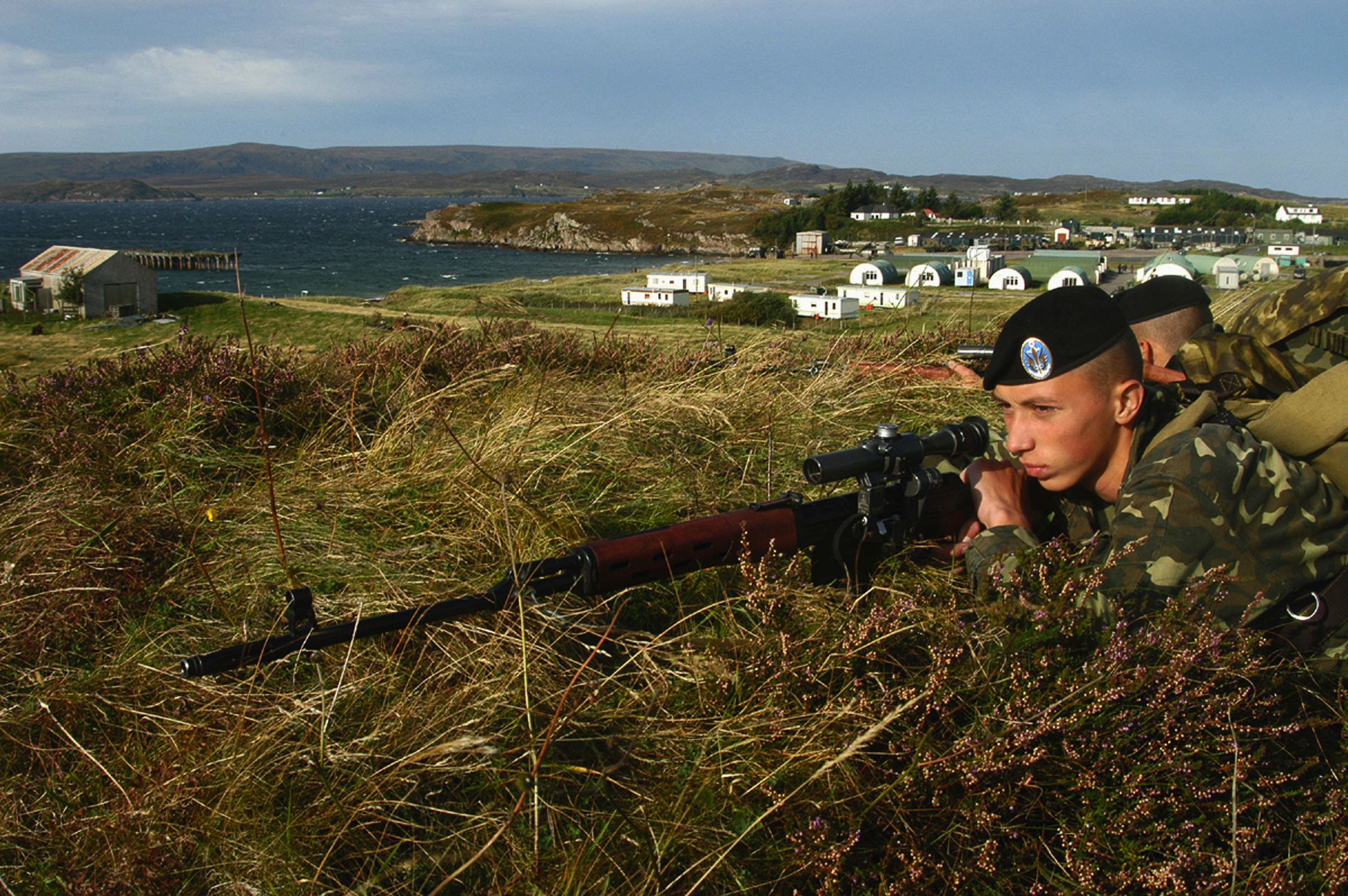
A Ukrainian naval infantryman armed with a Dragunov sniper rifle takes part in Exercise Northern Light '03 on the west coast of Scotland in 2003.

The Ukrainian Marines formerly wore, and were known as the "Black Berets" until 2018.

=== Venezuela ===
In the Venezuelan Army, black berets are of general use except for Paratroopers, Special Forces, Counter-insurgency troops and soldiers stationed inside the Ministry of Defence and Army headquarters.

== See also ==
- Beret
- Military beret
- Uniform beret, for the use of berets as uniform headgear outside the military

Military berets by color

- Green beret
- Maroon beret
- Red beret
- Tan beret
