= Erastus Kashopola =

Namibian military officer

- Born: 1 July 1958 (age 68); Ongonga, Namibia (then South-West Africa, South Africa)
- Military career
- Allegiance: Namibia
- Branch: People's Liberation Army of Namibia; Namibian Army
- Service years: 1990–2017
- Rank: Brigadier General
- Commands: 21 Motorised Infantry Brigade; 262 Battalion; 263 Batalion; 44 Arty Regiment
- Conflicts: Namibian War of Independence Second Congo War

Brigadier General Erastus Nomongula Kashopola is a retired Namibian military officer. His last command was as the General Officer Commanding 21 Motorised Infantry Brigade.

== Career ==
PLAN

His military career started in the 1970s when he joined the People's Liberation Army of Namibia in exile. He served in various roles until being appointed as an Artillery Unit chief of reconnaissance.

NDF

In 1990 he was a pioneer of the NDF officer corps as he was inducted with the rank of Captain. He served extensively in various command and support roles. He was the commanding officer of 44 Artillery Regiment, 263 Battalion, 262 Battalion. He commanded the fourth Namibian Battalion Iteration NAMBATT IV to Angola under MONUA. A combat veteran of the Second Congo War he was the Commanding officer of Battalion Group one the Namibian Army's first battalion rotation to DRC under its operation code-named Operation Atlantic (Democratic Republic of Congo). He also commanded the first and fourth Namibian Battalion Iteration NAMBATT I & NAMBAT IV to Liberia under UNMIL Iteration between 2004 and 2007.

He also was the commandant of the Oshivelo Army Battle School. As a colonel he was also a Deputy Commander for 4 Artillery Brigade (Namibia) and also Deputy commander for 21 Motorised Infantry Brigade. He was then Promoted to Brigadier General and appointed as GOC 21 Motorised Infantry Brigade succeeding Brigadier General Phillip Shikuma Kamati who was appointed as Defence Inspector General. He retired in July 2019 and was succeeded by Brigadier General Martin Shikomba as GOC 21 Motorised Infantry Brigade.

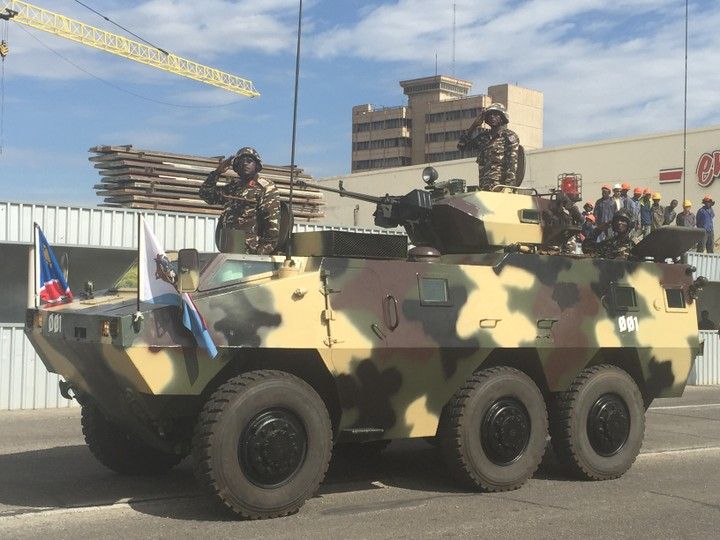
Brig Gen Kashopola (front) saluting the head of state during a 2015 parade

Qualifications

- Junior Command Course -India
- Command and Staff Course-Tanzania
- Diploma in Defence and Strategic Studies-China
- Diploma in Modern Management and Administration -United Kingdom

== Honours and decorations ==
- UNMIL Peacekeeping medal
- UNMIL Peacekeeping medal
- Campaign Medal with three gold award star
- MONUA Peacekeeping medal

Military offices
| Preceded by Brig Gen Phillip Kamati | GOC 21 Motorised Infantry Brigade; 19 July 2011 – 25 July 2019 | Succeeded by Brig Gen Martin Shikomba |
| Unknown | Commanding Officer 262 Battalion; 01 April 2006 – unknown date | Unknown |
| Unknown | Commanding Officer 263 Battalion unknown date – 31 March 2006 | Succeeded by Lt Col Abed Mukumangeni |
