= Victor Simunja =

Namibian politician

Deputy Minister of Defence
- In office 2000–2009
- President: Sam Nujoma; Hifikepunye Pohamba
- Minister: Erkki Nghimtina; Charles Namoloh

Personal details
- Born: 23 March 1958 (age 68) South West Africa
- Party: SWAPO
- Occupation: Soldier, politician

Military service
- Allegiance: Namibia
- Branch/service: PLAN; Namibian Army
- Years of service: 1975–2000
- Rank: Lieutenant Colonel

Victor Simunja (born 23 March 1958) is a Namibian politician. A member of the South West Africa People's Organization (SWAPO), Simunja was appointed to the National Assembly of Namibia in 2000 and served as Deputy Minister of Defense from 2000 to 2009. Simunja rose to the rank of lieutenant colonel in the Namibian Defence Force prior to entering political office. He is a member of the Mafwe ethnic group, indigenous to the Caprivi Strip.

== Military career ==
Born at Linyanti in Zambezi Region, Simunja began his military career in 1975 at the age of 17, fleeing into exile in Zambia. Simunja rose the ranks of the People's Liberation Army of Namibia, the military wing of SWAPO during the Namibian War of Independence. He served in a Cuban artillery regiment in Angola. He trained in both the Soviet Union (Vystrel Military Academy in 1982) and United States (Fort Leavenworth from 1992 to 1993). In 1990, he was appointed as acaptain in the Presidential Guard of Honour. From 1991 to 1992, Simunja served as a second in command of the 21 Ceremonial Guard Battalion. Simunja was an instructor at the Namibian Military School in Okahandja from 1993 to 1994. 1994 and 1995 saw Simunja stationed as staff operating officer at the army headquarters in Grootfontein. He was later promoted to lieutenant colonel and appointed as commanding officer of 46 artillery Regiment

== Involvement in the Caprivi conflict ==
Simunja led Namibian military operations in the Caprivi Region (today called the Zambezi Region) in 1999 and 2000 against UNITA rebels during the final stages of the Angolan Civil War. Simunja came to even greater international prominence in January 2000 when he displayed 81 suspected UNITA rebels to the media at Rundu.

== Political career ==
Simunja was first appointed to the National Assembly as a non-voting member in 2000 by President Nujoma. He was placed at the relatively safe spot of number 24 on SWAPO's National Assembly list prior to the 2004 parliamentary election, which allowed him to return to the National Assembly. In 2002, Simunja came out against private ownership of firearms during a debate in the National Assembly. He was Deputy Minister of Defence from 2000 to 2009, and also served the managing director of Windhoeker Maschinenfabrik.

On Heroes' Day 2014 he was conferred the Excellent Order of the Eagle, First Class.
