= Commander of the Army (Namibia) =

The commander of the Army is the professional head of the Namibian Army. The position of Army commander is held by a commissioned officer with the rank of major general. The Army Commander exercises the overall command of the Army. The current Army commander is Major General Aktofel Nambahu.

== List of commanders ==
Photo	Name	End	End	President
	Major General Solomon Huwala	1990	2000	Sam Nujoma
	Major General Martin Shalli	2000	2005	Sam Nujoma
	Major General Peter Nambundunga	2005	2011	Hifikepunye Pohamba
	Major General John Mutwa	2011	2013	Hifikepunye Pohamba
	Major General Tomas Hamunyela	2013	2017	Hifikepunye Pohamba Hage Geingob
	Major General Nestor Shali Shalauda	2017	2019	Hage Geingob
	Major General Matheus Alueendo	2019	2022	Hage Geingob
	Major General Aktofel Nambahu	2022	Present	Hage Geingob Nangolo Mbumba; Netumbo Nandi-Ndaitwah

== See also ==
- Namibian Defence Force
