= Tomas Hamunyela =

Namibian military officer

Tomas Nopoudjuu Hamunyela
- Born: 1 July 1957 (age 69); Namibia (then South-West Africa, South Africa)
- Military career
- Allegiance: Namibia
- Branch: People's Liberation Army of Namibia; Namibian Army
- Service years: 1977–2017
- Rank: Major General
- Commands: Commander of the Namibian Army (2013-2017)
- Conflicts: Namibian War of Independence

Major General Tomas Nopoudjuu Hamunyela is a retired Namibian military officer. His last command was as the commander of the Namibian Army.

== Career ==
His military career started in 1976 when he joined the People's Liberation Army of Namibia in exile in Zambia. He was then deployed in the eastern front in Zambia. Between 1076 and 1979 he was appointed as the combat engineer detachment commander. His first battle against the SADF was the battle at Singalamwe in 1976. In 1978 they attached the SADF base in Katima Mulilo as a retaliation for the Cassinga Massacre. Between 1979 and 1981 he was an infantry detachment commander. Between 1981 and 1984 he was sent to Yugoslavia to attend a military science course for two years. He was then requested to stay for another two years to translate the Yugosslavian language to English and then to Oshiwambo for Namibian attending school there. In 1985 he was sent to Angola at PLAN'S Northern Front Headquarters as its chief of operations. He was involved in a battle with the SADF between Eenhana and Odibo where he was wounded in action. On 31 October 1987 he was wounded in action again during Operation Firewood.

In 1990 he was a pioneer of the NDF officer corps as he was inducted with the rank of lieutenant colonel as chief of staff for operations, intelligence and communication at Grootfontein. He rose to the rank of colonel and appointed as chief of army operations, training, intelligence and communications after the re-oganisation of the NDF. In 1998 he was deployed to DRC during the Second Congo War, where he served as Southern African Development Community allied forces chief of staff. He got promoted to brigadier general in 1999 and appointed as general officer commanding the 26 Motorised Infantry Brigade. Later he was transferred to Army HQ and appointed as deputy army commander with the same rank. He was then appointed as defence attaché to Zimbabwe between 2010 and 2014. He was then promoted to major general and appointed as army commander on 30 December 2014.

== Honours and decorations ==
- NDF Commendation Medal
- Campaign Medal

Military offices
Preceded by John Mutwa	Namibian Army Commander; 20013 – 2017	Succeeded by Nestor Shali Shalauda
