= Defence Inspectorate (Namibia) =

Defence Inspectorate Directorate
- Country: Namibia
- Part of: Namibia Defence Force

Commanders
- Chief of Staff: Brigadier General Fiina Amupolo

The Defence Inspectorate Directorate is the branch of the Namibian Defence Force responsible for maintaining efficiency and effectiveness of the force. Its main role is to issue corrective measures when shortfalls are detected.

== Organisation ==
Defence Inspectorate Directorate consists of three divisions:

=== Defence Capabilities Division ===
It is mandated to capability, Policy oversight and conducting support systems evaluation.

=== Internal Audit Division ===
It is mandated to conduct forensic and Information Technology audits, Financial Risk management. The division also carries out Materiel Resources Inspection.

=== Complaints Division ===
It is mandated to investigating complaints, both internal and external.

== Leadership ==
Defence Inspector General
| From | Chief of Staff | To | Ribbon |
|---|---|---|---|
| 19 July 2011 | Brigadier General Philipus Shikuma Kamati | unknown date | |
| unknown date | Brigadier General Solomon Shilongo | 2016 | |
| 2016 | Brigadier General Aktofel Nambahu (Note: Later Major General) | 2019 | |
| 10 January 2019 | Brigadier General Fiina Amupolo | Incumbent | |
