= Army Battle School (Namibia) =

Training institution of the Namibian Army

- Active: 1996
- Country: (Namibia)
- Branch: Namibian Army
- Current Base: Oshivelo Army Base, Oshivelo

Commanders
- Current commander: Colonel

The Army Battle School is a combat training institution of the Namibian Army. It was created in 1996, and is located at the Oshivelo Military Base, Oshivelo.

== History ==
Recognizing the need to ensure that Units and Formations perfect and enhance their fighting effectiveness and maintain the required standard of professionalism the School was set up in 1996.

== Location ==
The school is located at the Oshivelo Military Base, Oshivelo.

== Training ==
Courses offered at the school are the:

- Company Group Commander Course(CGC)
- Platoon commander Course(PCC)
- Platoon Sergeant Course
- Section Commanders Course

== Facilities ==
The Germany government has assisted with the motor vehicle workshop and installation of a sick bay.

== Leadership ==
Army Battle School Leadership
From	Commandant	To	Ribbon
nd	Col Erastus Kashopola (Note: Later Brigadier General)	nd	
nd	Col //	nd	
From	Regimental Sergeant Major	To	Ribbon
nd	Unknown	nd	
