= Operation Atlantic (Democratic Republic of Congo) =

Canadian offensive during the Battle of Normandy in the Second World War

- Part of Second Congo War
Date	August 1998 – September 2001
Location	Democratic Republic of the Congo

Belligerents
Pro-government: DR Congo; Angola; Chad; Namibia; Zimbabwe; Sudan (alleged); Anti-Ugandan forces: LRA; ADF; UNRF II; FNI; Anti-Rwandan militias: FDLR; (Rwanda) ALiR; Interahamwe; RDR; Mai-Mai; Other Hutu-aligned forces; Anti-Burundi militias: CNDD-FDD; FROLINA	Rwandan-aligned militias: RCD; RCD-Goma; Banyamulenge; Ugandan-aligned militias: MLC; Forces for Renewal; UPC; Other Tutsi-aligned forces; Anti-Angolan forces: UNITA; Foreign state actors: Uganda; Rwanda; Burundi; Libya (alleged)

Operation Atlantic was the codename for Namibia's participation in the Second Congo War under the SADC banner. The Namibian Defence Force was tasked to participate alongside Zimbabwe and Angola to help the Government of DRC to repel the Rwanda backed rebels.

== Background ==
The war initially erupted when Congolese president Laurent-Désiré Kabila turned against his former allies from Rwanda and Uganda, who had helped him seize power. The conflict expanded as Kabila rallied a coalition of other countries to his defense. The war drew in nine African nations and approximately 25 armed groups, making it one of the largest wars in African history.

== Units involved ==
=== Namibian Army ===
The Namibian Army deployed a battle group during the Second Congo War that numbered about 2000 troops and consisted of Infantry, Artillery, Signals Detachments. The first commander of the battle group was Brigadier James Auala. 11 soldiers that had been cut off and surrounded after whilst defending Lusambo with allied Zimbabwean soldiers on 7 June 1999, whilst 37 DRC soldiers defected to the rebel side in this battle. This battle was part of a rebel offensive aimed at Mbuji-Mayi that is 120 km north east of Lusambo. In 1998, Namibian and Zimbabwean soldiers were encircled in the town of Ikela as the DRC brigade they went to bolster defected to the rebels. The Allied Namibian and Zimbabwean soldiers would remain encircled for over a year and replenishment was only possible via the air.

=== Namibian Air Force ===
Known as the Namibian Defence Force Air Wing at the time, Harbin Y-12 transport aircraft were deployed to the DRC. They were used on logistics supply missions within the DRC as well as withdrawing Namibian troops at the end of the war. The Air Wing also deployed Allouete helicopters for support operations.

== Aftermath ==
The United Nations deployed the United Nations Mission in the Democratic Republic of Congo (MONUC) to monitor the ceasefire.

== Casualties ==
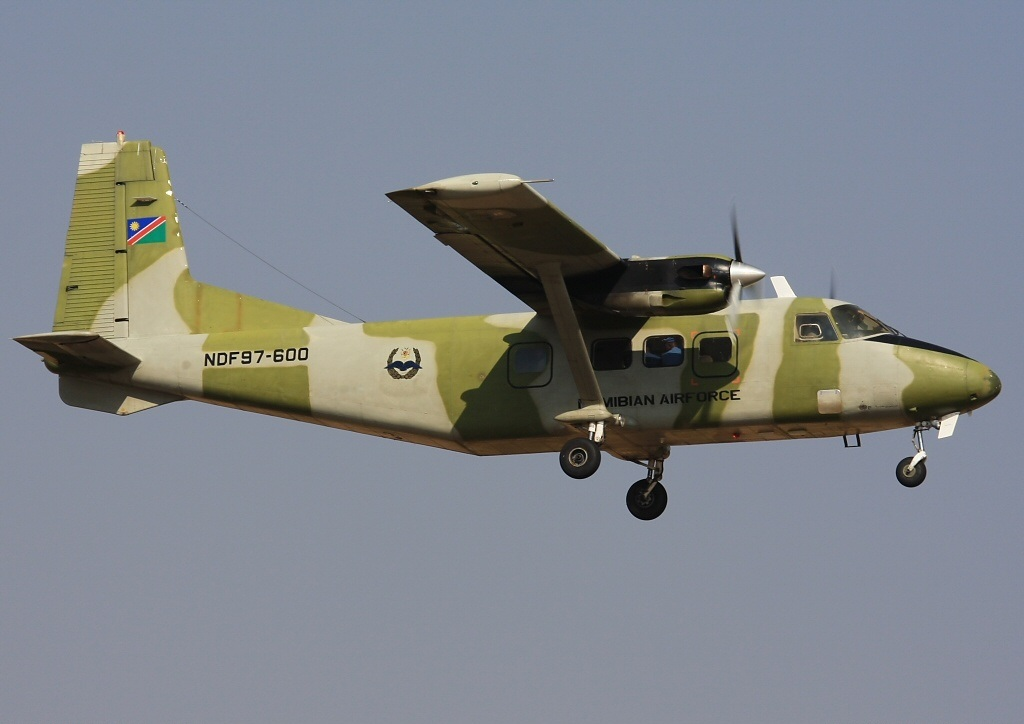
Harbin Y-12 Aircraft that was deployed in DRC

About 30 Namibian Serviceman died in the DRC from Sickness, Accidents and Combat. On 1 August 1999, an air force flight engineer died after he was hit by anti-aircraft fire on a Harbin Y-12 that was en route to resupply Namibian Army and Zimbabwe National Army troops besieged at Ikela. Two Namibian Alouette helicopters collided in mid-air while on operations during the war due to bad weather on 15 January 1999. The accident claimed nine lives, including two Namibian pilots and three technicians. Seven soldiers who have been missing in action have since been declared dead. The seven had gone missing around the Deya River close to Kabalo, Deya-Katutu, and Lusambo areas.
