= Nestor Shali Shalauda =

Namibian military officer

- Born: 6 January 1958 (age 68); Okalongo, Namibia
- Military career
- Allegiance: Namibia
- Branch: Namibian Army
- Service years: 1975-2019
- Rank: Major General
- Commands: Namibian Army (2017-2019); Deputy Army Commander (2015-2017); 4 Artillery Bde (2014-2015)

Major General Nestor Shali Shalauda is a retired Namibian military officer who served as commander of the Namibian Army (NA). He was appointed the commander of the Namibian Army in July 2017 until his retirement on 31 July 2019.

== Career ==
Major General Shalauda went into exile in 1974 and underwent basic infantry training Oshatotwa, Zambia in 1975 under the People's Liberation Army of Namibia. At Independence he was inducted into the Namibian Defence Force as a lieutenant and appointed as a platoon leader. In 1992 he was promoted to captain and appointed as a battery commander, in 1998 he was promoted to major and appointed as a regimental second in command. In 2004 he was promoted to lieutenant colonel and appointed as a regimental commanding officer. In 2011 he was promoted to colonel and appointed as a 2IC of 12 Motorised Infantry Brigade. In 2014 he was promoted to brigadier general and appointed as general officer commanding 4 Artillery Brigade. In 2015 he was appointed as Deputy Army Commander.

== Honours and decorations ==
- Namibian Army Pioneer Medal
- Army Ten Years Service Medal
- NDF Campaign Medal
- Army Twenty Years Service Medal
- NDF Commendation Medal

Military offices
Preceded by Major General Tomas Hamunyela	Commander of the Namibian Army; 2017-2019	Succeeded by Major General Matheus Alueendo
