= Logistic Support Battalion (Namibia) =

- Country: Namibia
- Type: Combat Support
- Role: Military logistics
- Size: Battalion
- Part of: Namibian Army
- Garrison/HQ: Grootfontein, Otjozondjupa Region

Commanders
- Notable commanders: Lieutenant Colonel John Mutwa

Logistic Support Battalion is a unit of the Namibian Army based at Grootfontein. The battalion was formed in 1990 at the onset of the formation of the Namibian Defence Force.

== Role ==
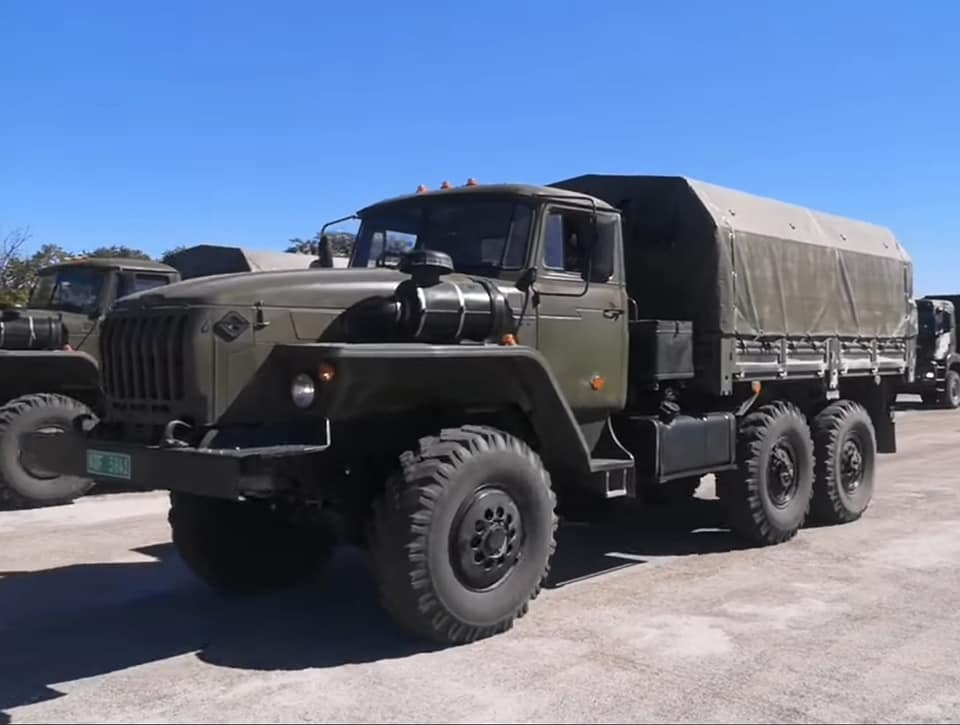
Army Ural logistics freight truck

The role of the unit is to provide military logistics to the Namibian Army. The unit is supplied by the Composite Depot.

== Equipment ==
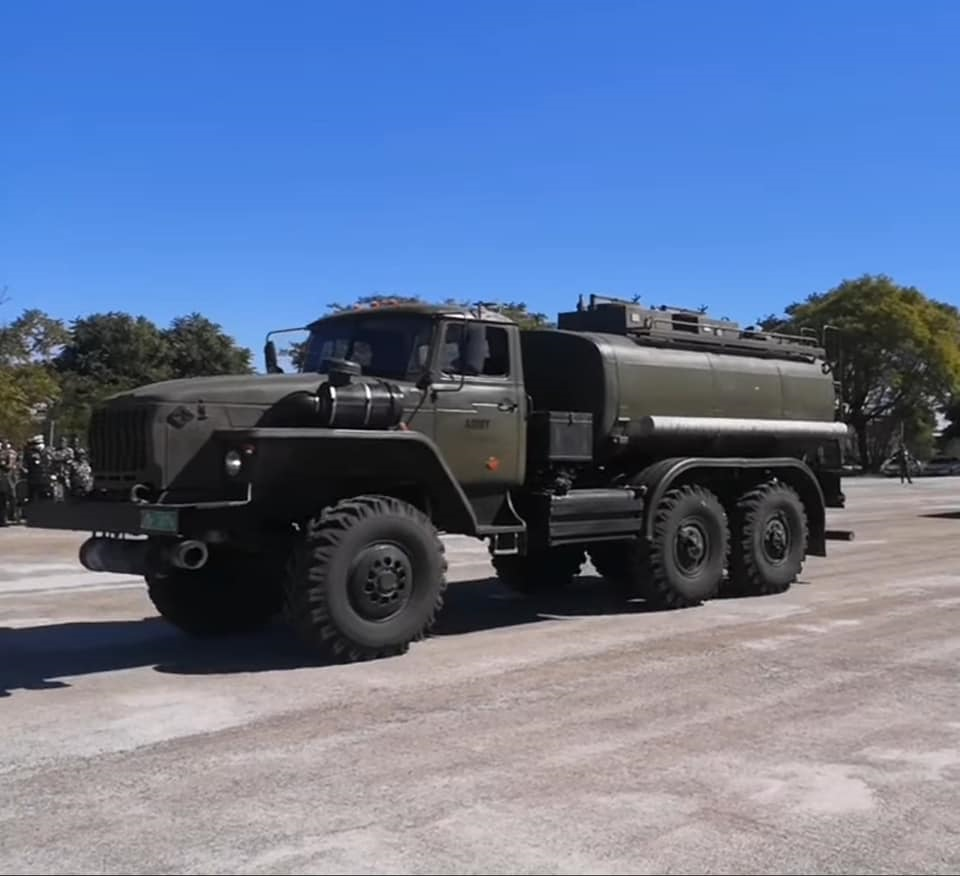
Ural fuel bowser

The regiment uses the following equipment:

- Wer'wolf MKII
- Ural-375
- Ural-4320
- Steyr 90 series
- MAN KAT1

== Leadership ==
Logistic Support Battalion
From	Commanding Officer	To	Ribbon
1994	Lt Col John Mutwa (Note: Later Lieutenant General)	1996	
