= Aktofel Nambahu =

Namibian military officer

Aktofel Ndengu Nambahu
- Born: 1970 (age 55–56); Namibia (then South-West Africa, South Africa)
- Military career
- Allegiance: Namibia
- Branch: Namibian Army
- Service years: 1980's - Present
- Rank: Major general
- Commands: Army Commander (2022-Present); GOC 12 Motorised Infantry Brigade (2020-2022)
- Conflicts: Namibian War of Independence

Major General Aktofel Nambahu (born 1970) is a Namibian military officer who is currently serving as commander of the Namibian army. He was appointed the commander of the Namibian army on 29 December 2022.

== Career ==
Nambahu's military career began in 1980's when he joined the People's Liberation Army of Namibia (PLAN) in exile participating in the liberation struggle. In July 1990 he was repatriated to Namibia under the UNTAG programme and began his career in the Namibian Army. In the Army he served in the Provost corps as an officer. He has participated in two United Nations Missions namely United Nations Mission in Ethiopia and Eritrea and the United Nations Operation in Côte d'Ivoire as a staff officer. As a Brigadier General he served as exercise director for "Exercise Khan Strike II", Whilst Serving as General Officer Commanding 12 Motorised Infantry Brigade. He rose through the ranks eventually being promoted to Major General and appointed as Army Commander.

== Honours and decorations ==
- NDF Campaign Medal
- NDF 10 years service medal
- UNMEE Peacekeeping medal
- UNOCI Peacekeeping medal
- Namibian Army Pioneer Medal
- Army Ten Years Service Medal
- Army Twenty Years Service Medal
- NDF Commendation Medal
- NDF Commendation Medal(Silver)
- NDF 20 Years Service medal
- NDF 30 Years Service Medal

Military offices
Preceded by Matheus Alueendo	Commander of the Namibian Army; 2022-	Incumbent
