= Engineer Regiment (Namibia) =

- Country: Namibia
- Type: Combat Support
- Role: Military engineering
- Size: Regiment
- Part of: Namibian Army
- Garrison/HQ: Otavi, Otjozondjupa Region
- Mottos: Move, Fight, Live

Commanders
- Current commander: Colonel

Engineer Regiment colloquially known as "The Sappers", is the Engineer arm of the Namibian Army based at Otavi. It is an independent regiment that functions as the Army's Engineer Corps and hosts all the engineer squadrons of the Army. It was founded in 1991 as the engineer company, later it was upgraded into the Engineer regiment.

== Role ==
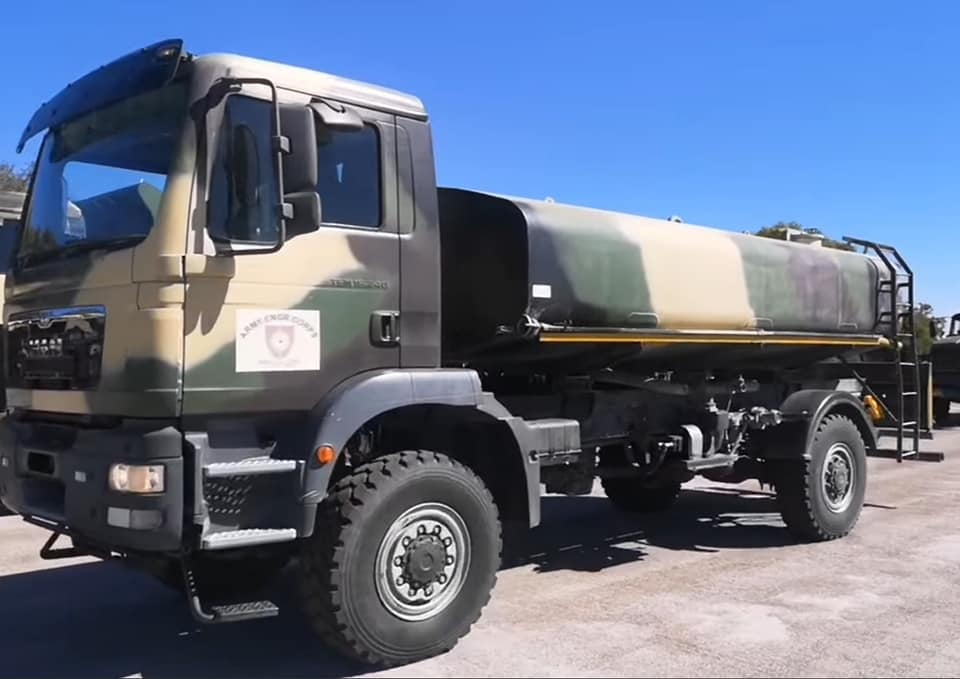
Engineer Regiment water bowser

The regiment is a significant player in the government's de mining efforts as the northern part of the Country have been left with numerous unexploded ordnance (UXO) as a result of the South African Border War. NDF sappers have been trained by the US government since 1995 in demining.

== Equipment ==
The Regiment uses the following Equipment:

- Toyota Hilux
- Toyota Land Cruiser
- Wer'wolf MKII
- Bull Dozer
- Tipper Truck
- Water Bowser
- Grader
- Metal detector

== Sub Units ==
- Headquarters Squadron
- Construction Engineer Squadron
- Combat Engineer Squadron

== Training ==
Service personnel specializing in Engineering are trained at various institutions in the country including from the United States Department of Defence.

== Leadership ==
Signal Regiment
From	Commanding Officer	To	Ribbon
2016	Col Tobias Nuuyoma	incumbent	
From	Regimental Sergeant Major	To	Ribbon
	Unknown		
