= Matheus Alueendo =

Namibian military officer

- Born: 4 March 1961 (age 65); Oniipa, Namibia (then South-West Africa, South Africa)
- Military career
- Allegiance: Namibia
- Branch: Namibian Army
- Service years: 1978-2022
- Rank: Major general
- Commands: Army Commander (2019-2022); Deputy Army Commander(2018-2019): Chief of Staff Defence Intelligence(2013–2018)
- Conflicts: Namibian War of Independence

Major General Matheus Alueendo (born 4 March 1961) is a retired Namibian military officer who served as commander of the Namibian army. He was appointed the commander of the Namibian army on 31 July 2019 until his retirement 31 December 2022

== Career ==
Alueendo's military career began in 1978 when he joined the People's Liberation Army of Namibia (PLAN) in exile participating in the liberation struggle. In July 1990 he was repatriated to Namibia under the UNTAG programme and began his career in the Namibian Army. After being commissioned as a lieutenant he rose through the ranks.

In 2003 he attended the Senior Command and Staff Course at the Defence Services Staff College in India, a faculty affiliated to Madras University. He also enrolled for the Master of Military Science degree in Defence and Strategic Studies whilst doing his senior staff course and graduated from both programme that year. In 2009 as a lieutenant colonel he completed his second master's degree in Strategic and Security Studies (MASSS) from the University of Namibia. In 2010 he was promoted to the rank of colonel and appointed as a senior staff officer in the Defence Intelligence Directorate. During the year 2014 he attended an Advanced Military Diploma Course at the Military Academy of the General Staff of the Armed Forces of Russia in Russia. In 2016 he attended the Advance post graduate military qualification 'ndc' programme at the National Defence College (India) whilst at the same time he also enrolled for the M.Phil. degree in 'Defence and Strategic Studies at the Madras University completing the 'ndc' programme in 2016 and the M.Phil. programme in 2018. He was promoted to brigadier general in November 2013 and appointed as Chief of Staff Defence Intelligence. In September 2018 he was appointed as the Deputy Namibian Army Commander.

On 31 July 2019 Alueendo was appointed commander of the Namibian Army.

=== Qualifications ===
- 2003: Post graduate military qualification ('psc'), Indian Defence Services Command and Staff Course
- 2003: Master's of Military Science Degree in Defence and Strategic Studies (MSc) Madras University, India
- 2009: Master's of Arts in Strategic and Security Studies (MASSS), University of Namibia
- 2014: Advance Military Diploma, Academy of General Staff, Russia
- 2016: Advance post graduate military qualification ('ndc') National Defence College (India)
- 2018: Master's of Philosophy Degree Strategic Studies, Madras University, India

== Honours and decorations ==
- NDF Campaign Medal
- NDF 10 years service medal
- UNMIL Peacekeeping medal
- UNMIL Peacekeeping medal
- Namibian Army Pioneer Medal
- Army Ten Years Service Medal
- Army Twenty Years Service Medal
- NDF Commendation Medal

Military offices
Preceded by Nestor Shali Shalauda	Commander of the Namibian Army; 2019-	Incumbent
