= Army School of Artillery =

Training institution of the Namibian Army

- Active: 2016
- Country: (Namibia)
- Branch: Namibian Army
- Current Base: Oluno Army Base, Ondangwa

Commanders
- Current commander: Lieutenant Colonel

The Namibian Army School of Artillery is a training institution of the Namibian Army. It was created in 2016, and is located at the Oluno Military Base, Ondangwa.

== History ==
Recognizing the need to ensure that Artillery Formation produced quality and effective gunners who maintain the required standard of professionalism the School was set up in 2016 With the help of the South African National Defence Force's Army Artillery Formation.

== Location ==
The school is located at the Oluno Military Base, Ondangwa.

== Training ==
Courses offered at the school are the:

- Artillery Ordinance Operators Course.

== Leadership ==
Army Battle School Leadership
From	Commandant	To	Ribbon
nd	Lietenant Colonel Ambrosius Kwedhi	nd	
nd	Col //	nd	
From	Regimental Sergeant Major	To	Ribbon
nd	Unknown	nd	
