= 21 Motorised Infantry Brigade =

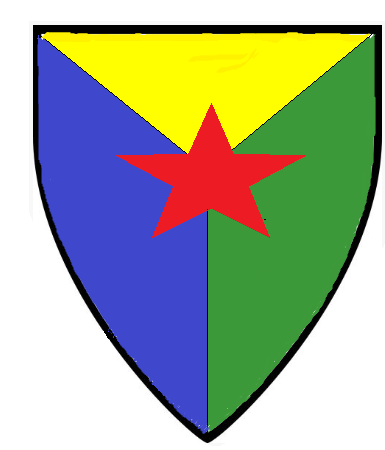
- Emblem of 21 Mot Inf Bde.
- Country: Namibia
- Branch: Namibian Army
- Type: Motorised Infantry
- Size: Brigade
- Part of: Namibian Army
- Garrison/HQ: Suiderhof, Windhoek
- Colors: Blue, Yellow, Green

Commanders
- General Officer Commanding: Brigadier General Johannes Shimweetheleni
- Notable commanders: Victor Simunja

21 Motorised Infantry Brigade (pronounced as Two One Motorised Infantry Brigade) is a brigade of the Namibian Army based at Suiderhof, Windhoek. The prefix "21" is taken from 21 March 1990, Namibia's independence day. The brigade is responsible for the defence of the central areas of Namibia. Its subordinate units are situated in the Khomas. Apart from its Motorised battalions it also consists of a Mechanized Infantry Battalion. It also provides a ceremonial guard battalion for the Head of State.

== Equipment ==
The Brigade uses the following equipment:

- Toyota Land Cruiser
- Toyota Hilux
- Ural Trucks
- WZ-523 Wheeled Armored Personnel Carrier

== Units ==
The standard Namibian Infantry Brigade consists of a brigade Headquarters, a transport company, logistics company and a medical company supporting three Infantry battalions an artillery regiment and an air defence regiment. It also has a ceremonial guard battalion attached to it.

The following units are based at the brigade headquarters in Windhoek:

- 21 Ceremonial Guard Battalion
- 211 Battalion
- 212 Battalion
- 213 Mechanized Infantry Battalion
- 21 Artillery Regiment (Otjiwarongo)

=== 21 Ceremonial Guard Battalion ===
21 Ceremonial Guard Battalion is a guard of honour unit of the NDF. It was also responsible for protecting the President of Namibia till President Hifikepunye Pohamba stopped the practice. It has 500 members and is based in the capital where it performs public duties. It uses Russian/German foot drill when marching, in part due to the country returning to the traditional goose step. International leaders that have been honored by the battalion include Russian President Dmitry Medvedev, Kenya President Uhuru Kenyatta and the Chair of the African Union Commission Moussa Faki. Deputy Defence Minister Victor Simunja served as captain of the unit in 1990.

== Gallery ==

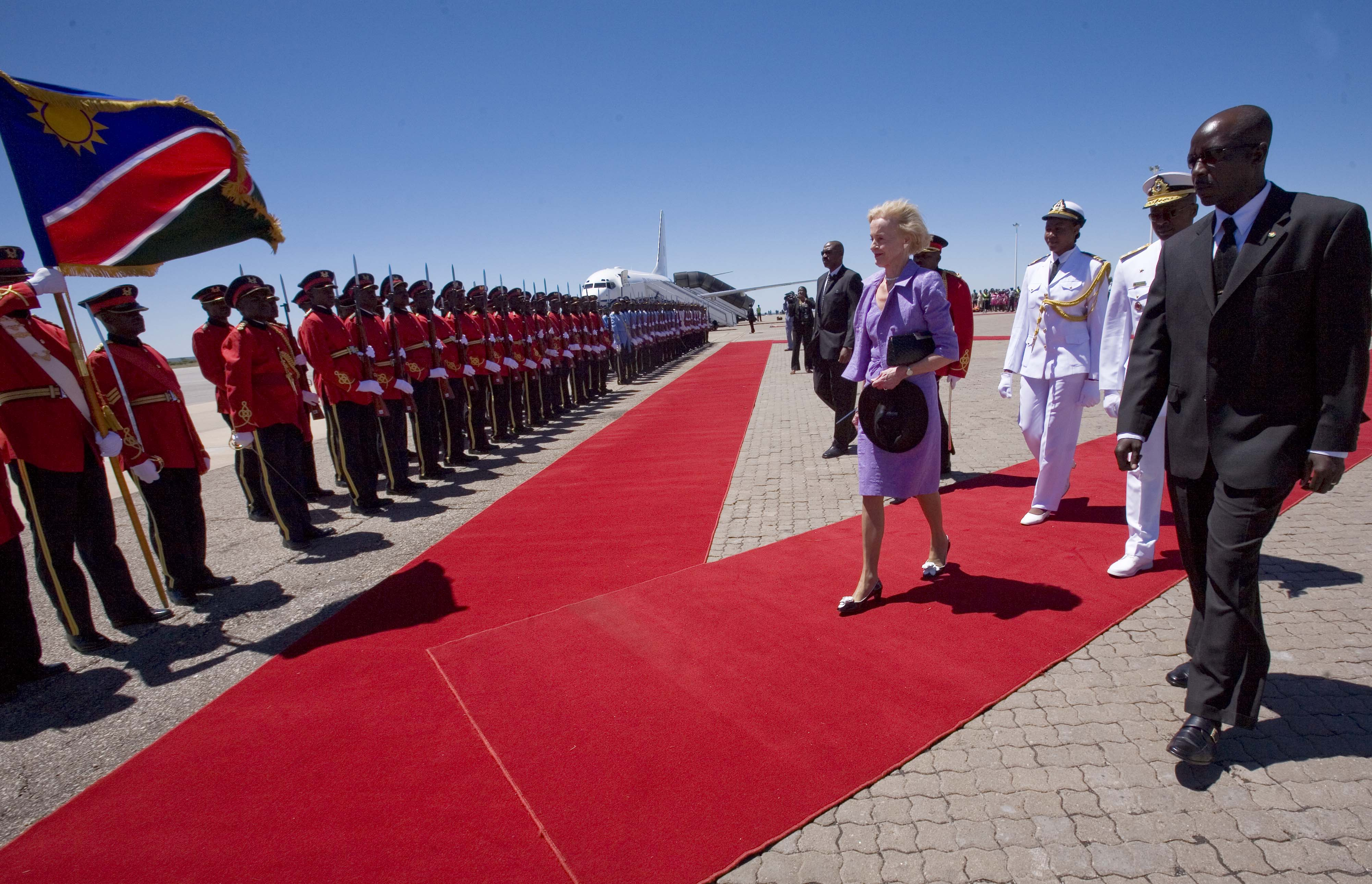

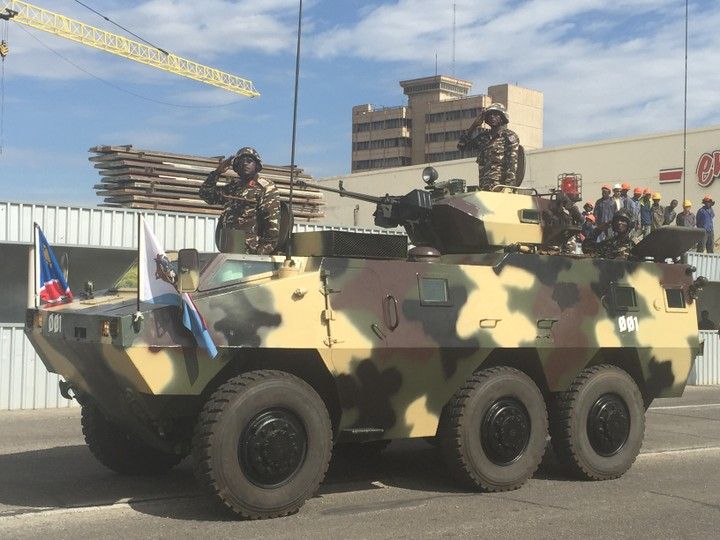

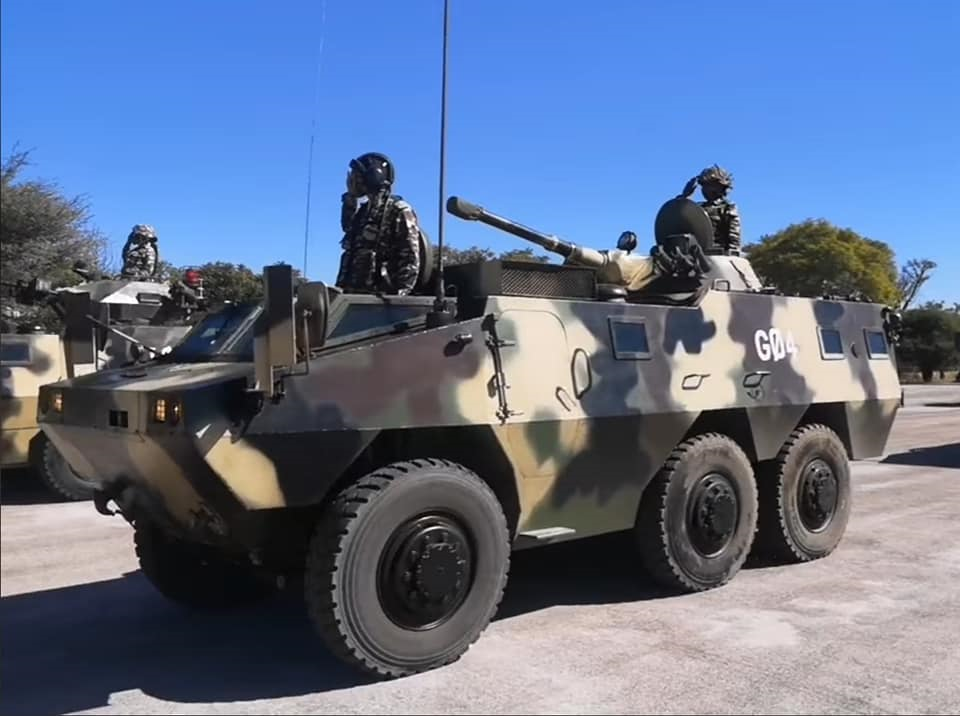

== Leadership ==
21 Motorised Infantry Brigade
From	General Officer Commanding	To	Ribbon
Unknown date	Brigadier General Philipus Shikuma Kamati	19 July 2011	
19 July 2011	Brigadier General Erastus Kashopola	25 July 2019	
25 July 2019	Brigadier General Martin Nangolo Shikomba	2024	
2024	Brigadier General Johannes Shimweetheleni	Incumbent	
