= 4 Artillery Brigade (Namibia) =

- Active: 1999 to present
- Country: Namibia
- Type: Regular artillery
- Size: Artillery brigade
- Part of: Namibian Army
- Garrison/HQ: Otjiwarongo, Otjozondjupa Region
- Nicknames: "4 Arty", "Gunners"
- Colors: Red, brown, yellow
- Engagements: Second Congo War

Commanders
- General Officer Commanding: Brigadier General Abraham Nghondela

4 Artillery Brigade (pronounced as Four Artillery Brigade), colloquially known as "Gunners", is the artillery arm of the Namibian Army based at Otjiwarongo. It functions as the Army's artillery Formation and hosts all the Artillery regiments of the Army.

== History ==
The brigade was formed in 1999. It is the controlling entity of all artillery units in the Army. Shortly after its formation the Brigade received G2 towed artillery from South Africa. The prefix "4" is taken from 4 May 1978, the date on which the SADF attacked a SWAPO refugee camp in Cassinga.

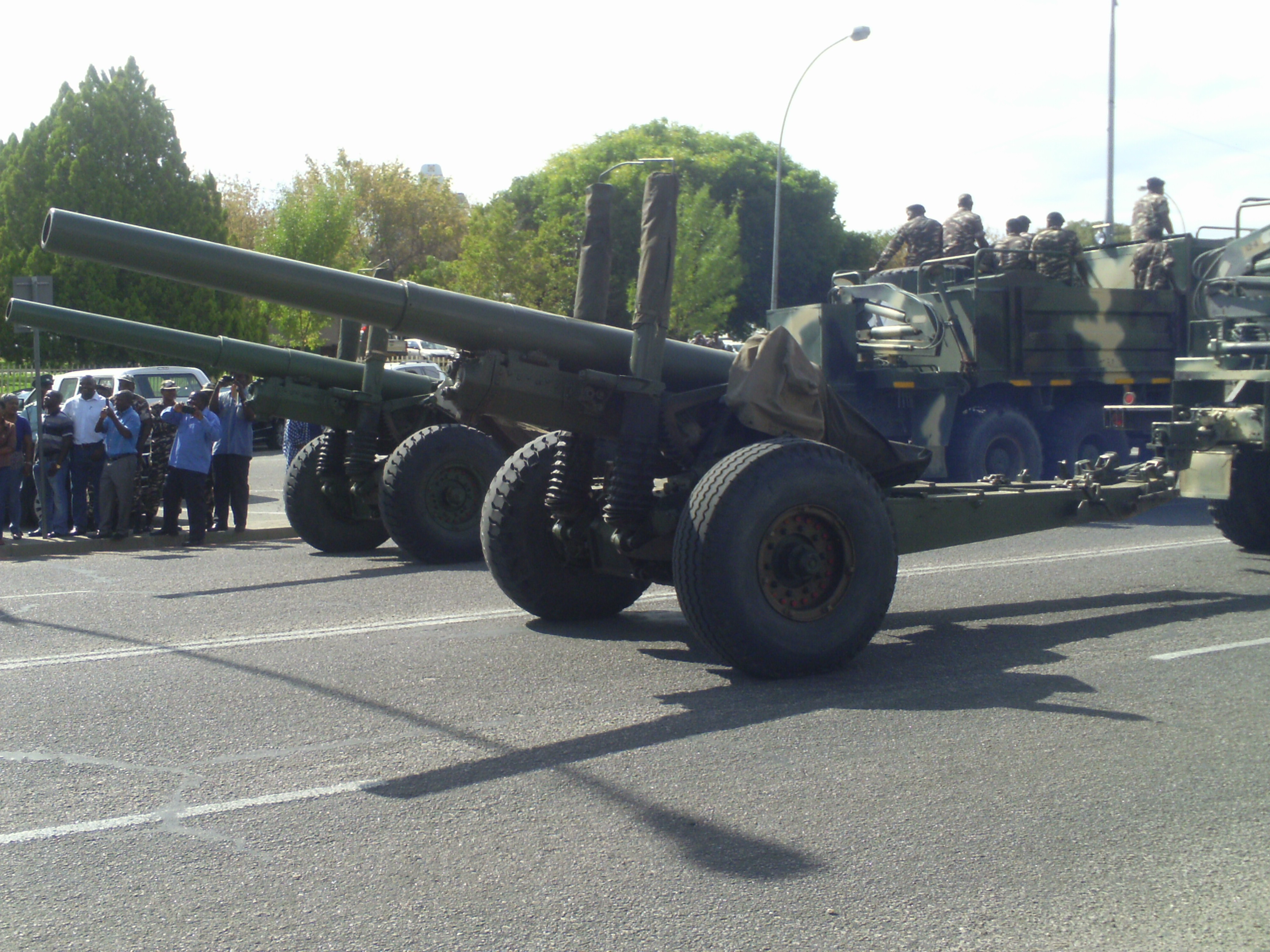
Army G2 artillery being towed

== Equipment ==
The Brigade uses the following equipment:

- BL 5.5
- Ordnance QF 25 pounder
- 152 mm howitzer-gun M1937 (ML-20)
- BM-21 Grad
- Grad-P
- Type 81 (rocket launcher)
- 9P138 Grad-1
- Type 63 multiple rocket launcher

== Units ==
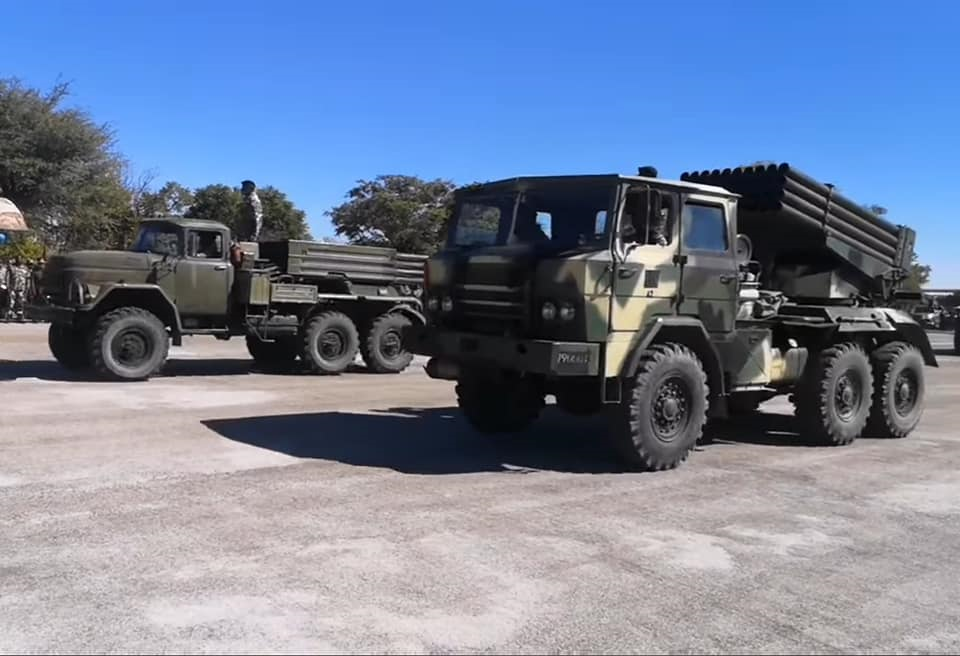
Army Grad 1 and Type 81 MRLS

- 12 Artillery Regiment

-Attached to 12 Motorised Infantry Brigade

- 44 Artillery Regiment
- 46 Artillery Regiment
- 21 Artillery Regiment

-Attached to 21 Motorised Infantry Brigade

- 26 Artillery Regiment

-Attached to 26 Motorised Infantry Brigade

- School of Artillery

-Based at Ondangwa the school trains students to specialize them as gunners through the Artillery Ordnance Operators Course.

== Gallery ==
Artillery battery firing G-2 Guns and MRLS

== Leadership ==
4 Artillery Brigade
From	General Officer Commanding	To	Ribbon
Unknown date	Brigadier General Angunga David Shivute	2014	
2014	Brigadier General Nestor Shali Shalauda (Note: Later Major General) (Note: Later Commander of the Namibian Army)	2015	
2015	Brigadier General Joseph Kakoto	2018	
2018	Brigadier General Ambrosius Kwedhi	2019	
2018	Brigadier General Petrus Iilonga	2021	
2021	Brigadier General Alweendo Namukwambi	2024	
2024	Brigadier General Abraham Nghondela	Incumbent	
From	Formation Sergeant Major	To	Ribbon
2004	WO1 Albert Siyaya	2009	
