= Air Defence Brigade (Namibia) =

- Country: Namibia
- Type: Air Defence
- Size: brigade
- Part of: Namibian Army
- Garrison/HQ: Luiperdsvallei Windhoek, Khomas Region

Commanders
- Current commander: Brig Gen Patrick Owen Orange

Air Defence Brigade is a brigade of the Namibian Army based at Windhoek. It functions as the Army's Air Defence Formation and hosts all the Air Defence regiments of the Army. It was founded in 1991 as the Air Defence Battalion, later it was transformed into the Air defence regiment before being upgraded to a brigade.

== Equipment ==
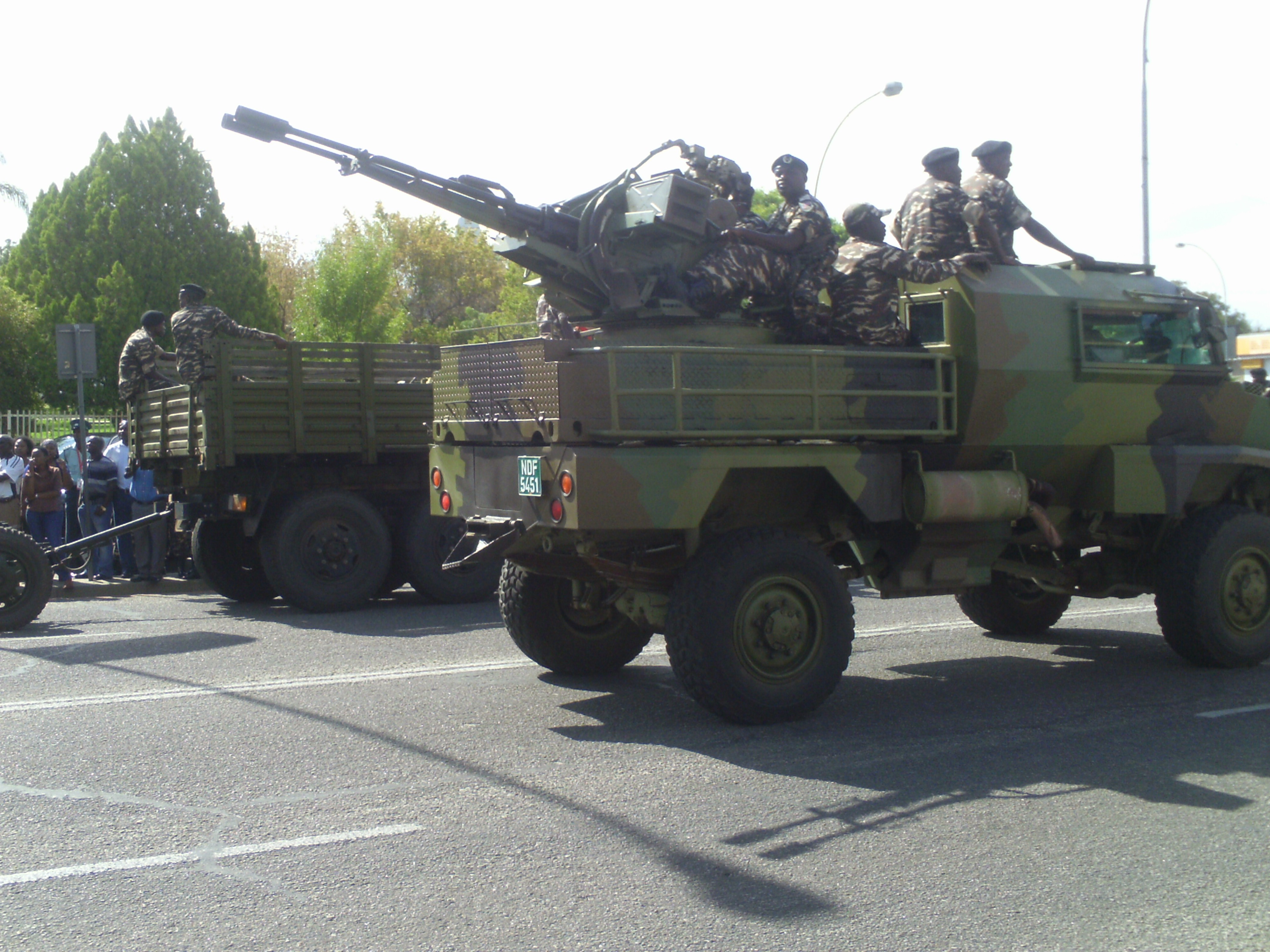
Zu-23-2 cannon mounted on a wolf MPV

The Brigade uses the following equipment:

Air Defence equipment
Name	Image	Origin	Status
37 mm automatic air defense gun M1939 (61-K)	Example	Soviet Union	In Service
ZU-23-2	Example	Soviet Union	In Service
9K32 Strela-2	Example	Soviet Union	In Service
FN-6	Example	China	In Service

== Units ==
- Hawk Regiment
- Eagle Regiment
- Falcon Regiment

== Leadership ==
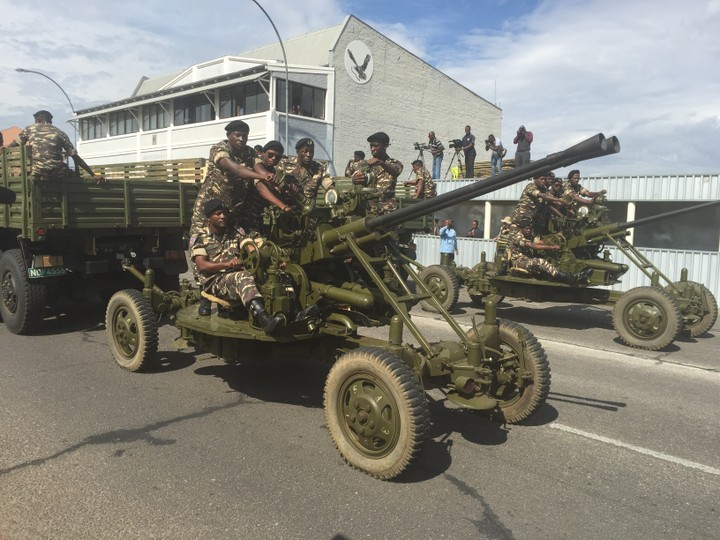
37mm Air Aircraft cannon

Air Defence Brigade
From	General Officer Commanding	To	Ribbon
Unknown date	Brigadier General David Shiimbi	2016	
2016	Brigadier General Moses Shalongo Nghilifa	2019	
2019	Brigadier General Lazarus Herman	27 October 2020	
27 October 2020	Brigadier General Simeon Shikwambi Mwaala	2023	
2023	Brigadier General Patrick Owen Orange	Incumbent	
From	Formation Sergeant Major	To	Ribbon
1991	WO1 Albert Siyaya	1998	
