= Windhoeker Maschinenfabrik =

Namibian defense contractor

- Company type: State owned enterprise
- Industry: Military
- Founded: 1939
- Headquarters: Southern Industrial Area, Windhoek, Namibia
- Products: Armoured vehicles
- Website: www.wmf.com.na

Windhoeker Maschinenfabrik (WMF) is a Namibian defense contractor located in Windhoek, Namibia. It is operated as a subsidiary of the Namibian Defence Force (NDF). WMF designs and manufactures monocoque V-hull armoured combat vehicles. WMF is responsible for the armoured bodywork fabrication while engines, transmissions and axles are built by MAN.

== History ==
Windhoeker Maschinenfabrik was founded in 1939. It later provided equipment for the South African Defence Force and South West African Territorial Force. In 1977, WMF began manufacturing Mine Protected Vehicles. In 1998, WMF was nationalised by the Government of Namibia. The company functions as a subsidiary of Namibian Defence Force and is part of the August 26 Group of companies. Retired Major General Ben Kadhila is the current Managing Director of WMF.

== Products and services ==
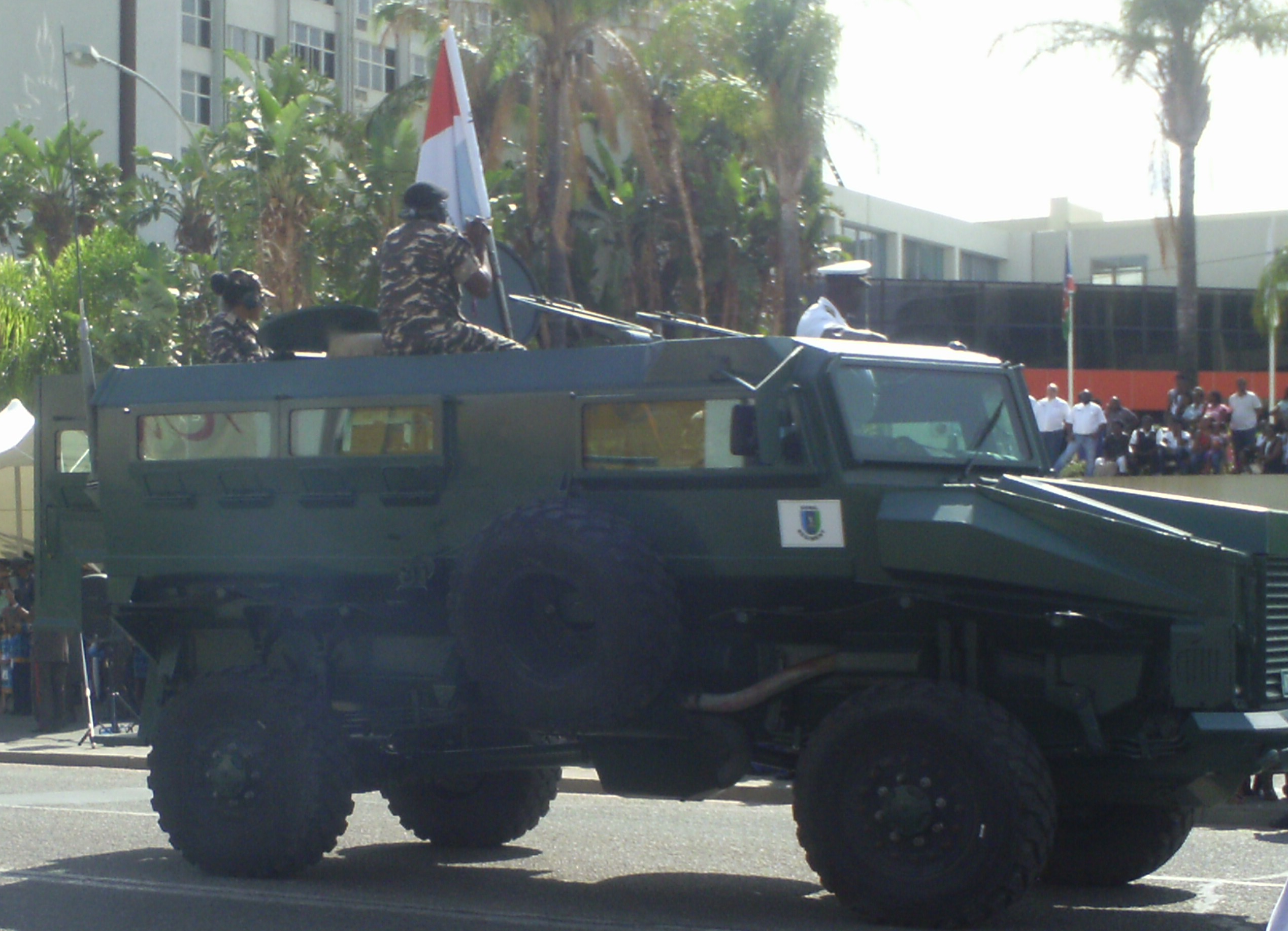
WM Wer’wolf MKII MRAP

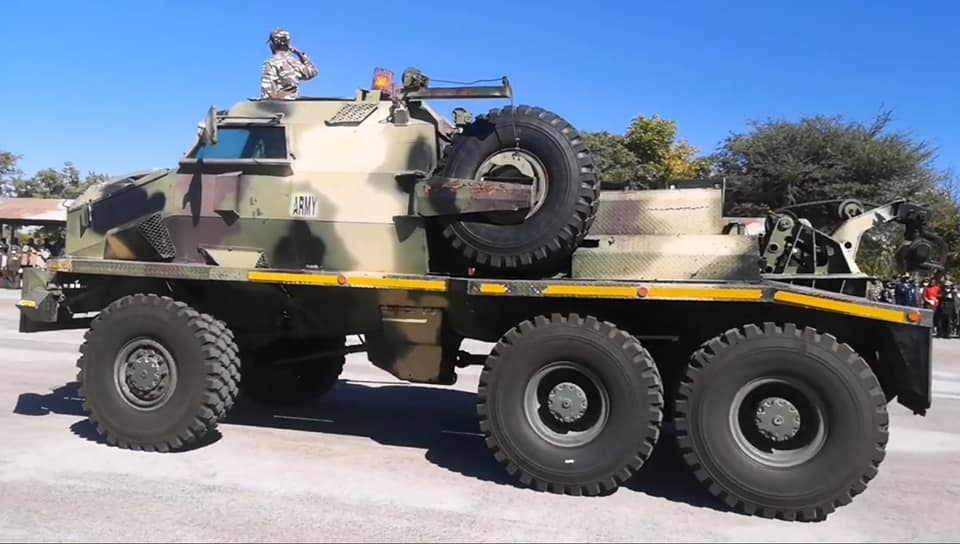
Wolf 6x6 recovery vehicle

WMF performs the following services:

- armouring of plant and construction machinery
- Refurbishing of other armoured vehicles such as the Casspir.

WMF produces all-wheel driven personnel carriers and other armoured vehicles with the specifications of Mine protected vehicles (MPVs) and Mine-Resistant Ambush Protected Vehicles (MRAPV):

- Wolf I,
- Wolf II,
- Wolf Turbo II (14 tons),
- WerWolf Mk I (13 tons),
- Wer’wolf MKII (until 2015, 13 tons), as 4x4 and as 6x6 recovery vehicle
- MK III (since 2015, 9 tons), as 4x4 and as 6x6 and 8x8 recovery vehicle

== Users ==
WMF’s clients are the following:

- Namibian Defence Force
- Angolan Armed Forces
- Umbutfo Eswatini Defence Force
- NamPower
- United Nations agencies
- Humanitarian agencies such as:
  - Red Cross
  - Doctors Without Borders
  - Menschen gegen Minen, German de-mining charity
- Filmmakers and television crews
