= August 26 Group =

Holding company for the Namibian military

- Company type: State owned enterprise
- Industry: Military
- Founded: 1998
- Headquarters: Windhoek, Namibia
- Products: various
- Website: www.august26.com.na

The August 26 Group, short August 26, is a state owned enterprise in Namibia. It is fully owned by the Namibian Defence Force (NDF) and thus overseen by the Ministry of Defence and Veterans Affairs. The company was established in 1998 and is headquartered in Windhoek's Academia suburb. August 26 handles research, development and procurement on behalf of the defence ministry but has also spread into non-military branches like construction, tourism and agriculture.

== Company structure ==
August 26 is a holding company for several subsidiaries, many closely related to military supplies and services. As of 2025 it consists of the following companies:

- Windhoeker Maschinenfabrik, Namibia's only arms manufacturer
- Sat-Com, telecommunication enterprise for the military
- August 26 Manufacturing, amalgamation of the former August 26 textiles and garment factory, manufacturing of uniforms and personal protective equipment, and August 26 Industries, manufacturing footwear
- Agro-Tour Development Initiative, tourism and beef production at Mangetti East, Kavango West Region
- August 26 Construction,
- NamForce Life Insurance, insurance services for the armed forces and the general public
- August 26 Logistics, supply chain management and food and kitchen equipment supplier
- Enercon, fuel supply and distribution
- Sea Side Hotel and Spa, Swakopmund

== Controversies ==
August 26's audited reports have never been made public, citing confidentiality. Opposition parties have questioned whether they even have been compiled. During the company's existence, allegations of corruption, graft and mismanagement have surfaced, and August 26 is perceived to be a "holy cow", defying "even the [...] head of state".
