= Signal Regiment (Namibia) =

- Country: Namibia
- Type: Combat Support
- Role: Military communications
- Size: Regiment
- Part of: Namibian Army
- Garrison/HQ: Luiperd Vallei Windhoek, Khomas Region
- Mottos: Unity, Reliability, Concealment
- Colors: Light blue, over dark blue, over green
- Engagements: Second Congo War

Commanders
- Current commander: Colonel H Shikongo

Signal Regiment is an independent regiment of the Namibian Army based at Windhoek. It functions as the Army's Signals Formation and hosts all the signals squadrons of the Army. It was founded in 1991 as the signal company, later it was upgraded into the Signal regiment in November 1998.

== Equipment ==
The Regiment uses the following Vehicles:

- Toyota Hilux
- Toyota Land Cruiser
- Wer'wolf MKII

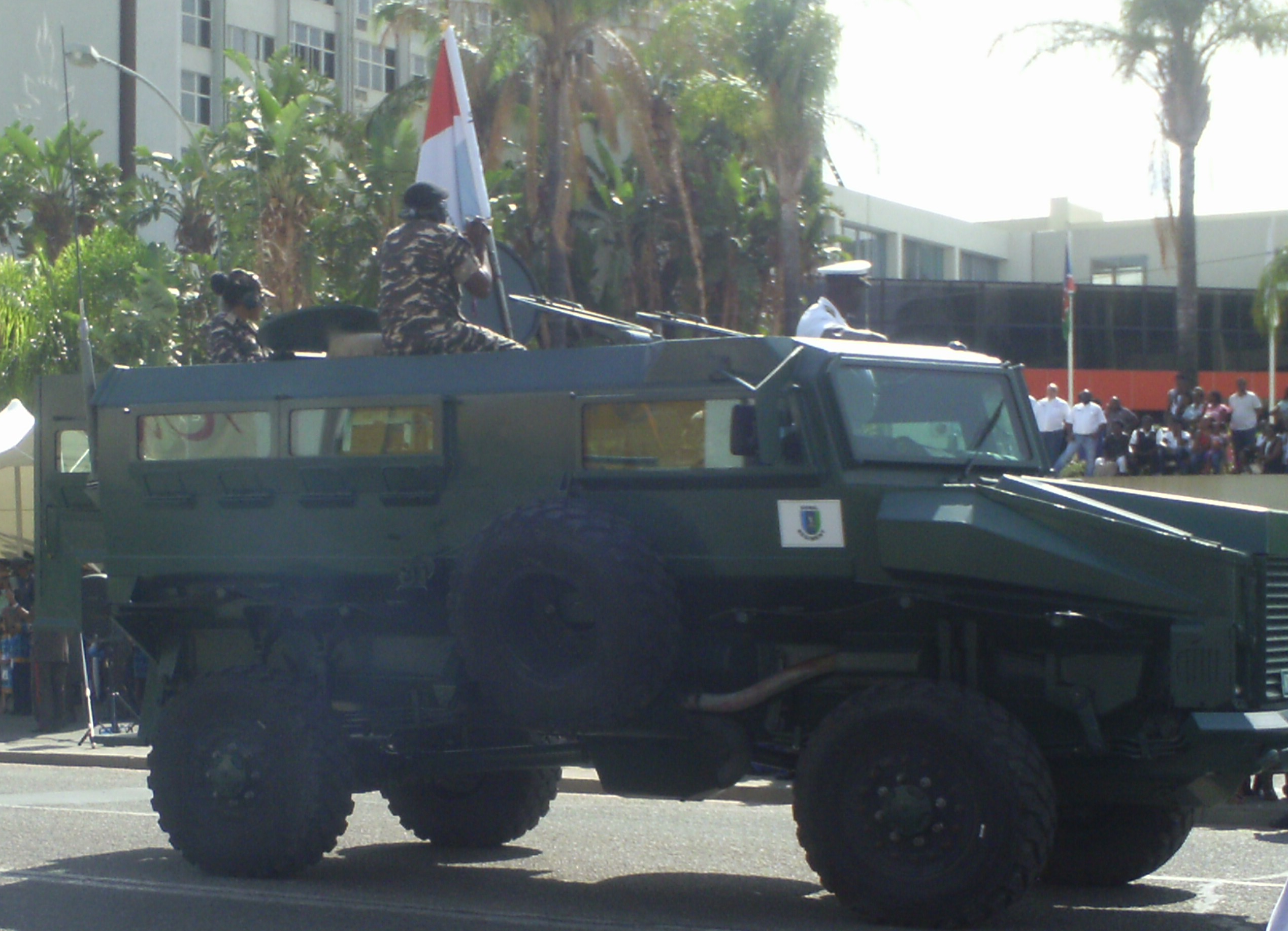
Wer'wolf mk II of the signal regiment

The Regiment uses the following Radio and Telephone equipment:

- Cheetah 1 VHF man portable radio
- Cheetah 3 VHF man portable radio
- Leopard HF, VHF & UHF radio

== Training ==
Service personnel specializing in Signals are trained at the School of Signals in Okahandja. The three courses in which signallers are taught are the Signal Officers Course, Computer Course and Communication Courses

== Leadership ==
Signal Regiment
From	Commander	To	Ribbon
Unknown date	Col SS Shilongo	unknown date	
Unknown date	Lt Col onel Josephat "Nandos" Mbako	unknown date	
Unknown date	Lt Col onel KN Shikufa	unknown date	
Unknown date	Col Joshua Namhindo	Unknown date	
Unknown date	Col FN Iyambo	Unknown date	
Unknown date	Col PP Hamukwaya	Unknown date	
From	Regimental Sergeant Major JN Shonena	To	Ribbon
Unknown date	H Shikongo		
