= 12 Motorised Infantry Brigade (Namibia) =

- Country: Namibia
- Type: Motorised Infantry
- Size: Brigade
- Part of: Namibian Army
- Garrison/HQ: Keetmanshoop, !Kharas
- Colors: Blue, Yellow

Commanders
- General Officer Commanding: Brigadier General Natanael Endjala

12 Motorised Infantry Brigade (pronounced as One Two Motorised Infantry Brigade) is a brigade of the Namibian Army based at Keetmanshoop. The prefix "12" is taken from 12 May 1929, Namibia's first president's, President Sam Nujoma birthday . The brigade is responsible for the defence of the southern areas of Namibia. Its subordinate units are situated in the Omaheke, Hardap, Karas and Erongo regions.

== Equipment ==
The Brigade uses the following equipment:

- Toyota Land Cruiser
- Toyota Hilux
- Ural Trucks

== Units ==
The standard Namibian Infantry Brigade consists of a bde Headquarters, a transport coy, logistics coy and a medical coy supporting three Infantry battalions an artillery regiment and an air defence regiment.

- 124 Battalion (Oamites)
- 125 Battalion (Walvis Bay)
- 126 Battalion (Gobabis)
- 12 Artillery Regiment

== Leadership ==
12 Motorised Infantry Brigade
From	General Officer Commanding	To	Ribbon
Unknown date	Brigadier General George Kalomho	Unknown date	
2010	Brigadier General Bernard Nkawa	25 February 2014	
25 February 2014	Brigadier General Peter Nghipunyati Nghilukilwa	2016	
2016	Brigadier General Epimacus Tshavuka	2018	
2018	Brigadier General Kashindi Eusebius ya Kashindi	2018	
2018	Brigadier General Joel Kapala	2020	
2020	Brigadier General Aktofel Nambahu (Note: Later Major General)	2022	
2022	Brigadier General Johannes Shimweetheleni	2024	
2024	Brigadier General Natanael Endjala	Incumbent	
