= Wer'wolf MKII =

Light tactical military vehicle

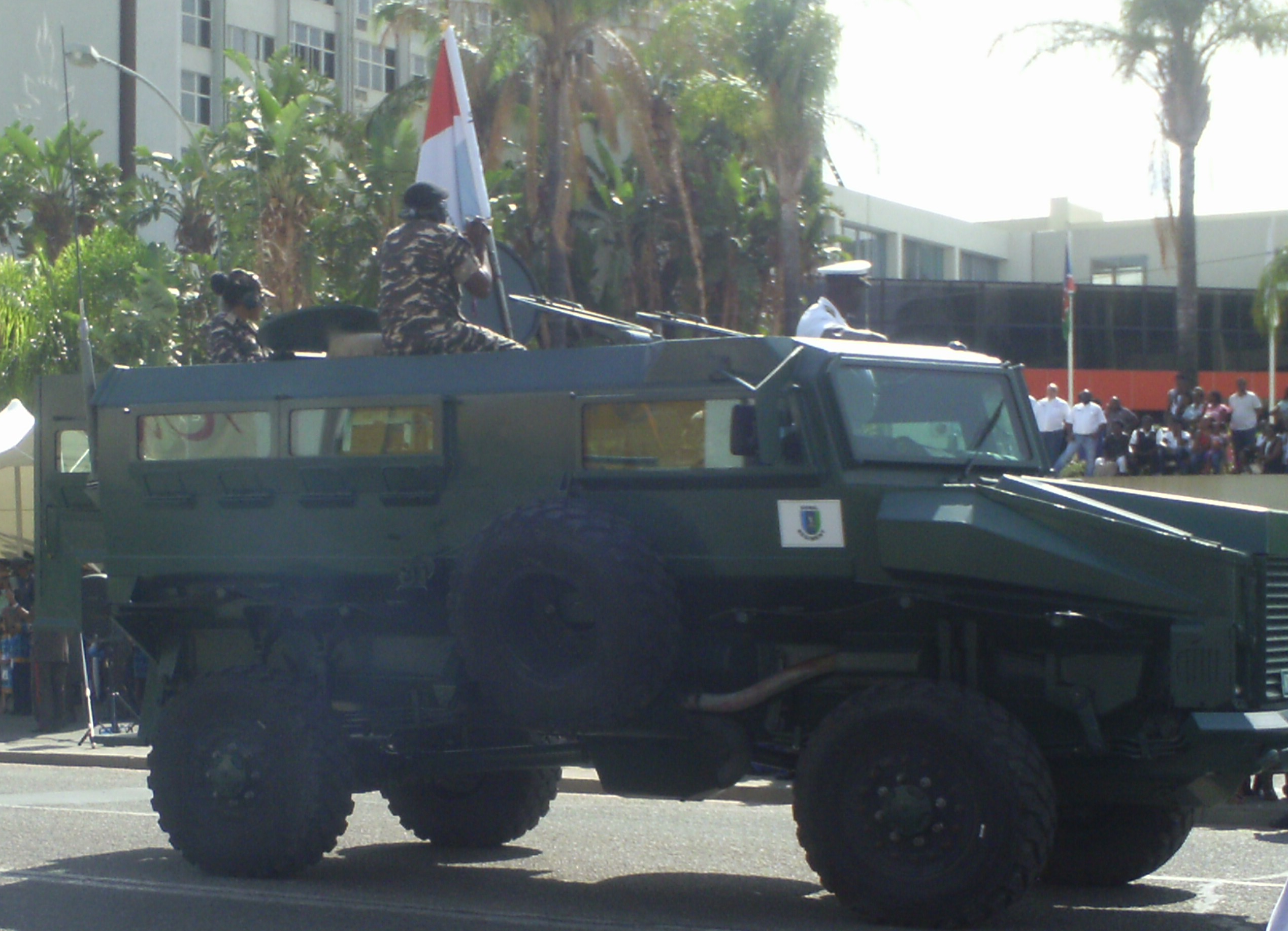
- Type: MRAP
- Place of origin: Namibia

Service history
- Used by: Namibian Defence Force

Production history
- Manufacturer: Windhoeker Maschinenfabrik
- Produced: 1998–present

Specifications
- Mass: 17,272 kilograms (38,078 lb)
- Length: 5,860 millimetres (231 in)
- Width: 2,335 millimetres (91.9 in)
- Height: 2,650 millimetres (104 in) without cupola 2,830 millimetres (111 in) with cupola
- Crew: 2
- Engine: Diesel
- Power/weight: 13.5 kilowatts per tonne (18.4 PS/t)
- Drive: 4x4 wheeled
- Operational range: 960 kilometres (600 mi)
- Maximum speed: 125 kilometres per hour (78 mph)

The Wer'wolf MKII is a Namibian designed and built military vehicle that offers protection against small arms fire and land mines. The vehicle uses a MAN chassis, axles and engine. The Wer'Wolf MKII is a modular vehicle. It is built with a crew compartment that seats three people plus a driver and a rear flatbed configuration. The flat bed configuration allows for different modules to be fitted. It is suited for rough terrain, in APC configuration the Wer'Wolf MKII can carry up to 10 passengers plus the driver. Designed and built in 1998 it was the first Mine Protected Vehicle manufactured by Windhoeker Maschinenfabrik after it was bought by Government of Namibia.

== Design ==
The Wer'wolf MKII was developed by Windhoeker Maschinenfabrik, a subsidiary of August 26 Group which in turn is wholly owned by the Government of Namibia. The vehicle utilizes a MAN Truck & Bus AG chassis, axle and engine and is built for the African operating environment. The modular design of the vehicle allows for the rear flatbed to be interchangeable with different mounts such as a personnel compartment, a ZU-23-2 gun mount amongst others. As with other typical Southern African mine protected vehicles of its era it also has monocoque Cavalry designed to deflect a mine blast away from the occupants or cargo. The Wer'wolf MKII is in service with the Namibia Defence Force (NDF).

The Wer'wolf MKII is 5,860 millimetres (231 in) in length, 2,335 millimetres (91.9 in) in width, and has a height of 2,650 millimetres (104 in). The four-wheeled vehicle can carry up to 10 passengers in APC configuration, plus driver. The crew compartment has two roof hatches which allow a gunner to use the weapon mount. The passenger APC compartment has an additional three hatches. Two doors in the rear of the vehicle provide access for the passengers and crew.

== Capabilities ==
The Wer'wolf MKII features ballistic protection that can withstand impacts of up to 7.62×51mm NATO rounds. The Wer'wolf MKII also provides protection against triple anti tank mines of up to 21 kilograms (46 lb) under any wheel and can also withstand a double anti tank mine explosion 14 kilograms (31 lb) under the hull. By adding an additional plate in the hull the vehicle can be protected against Explosively formed penetrator mines i.e.TMRP-6. It has four-wheel drive capability, and can achieve a top speed of 125 kilometres per hour (78 mph). The Wer'wolf MKII provides side protection from IED explosion of 14 kg of TNT from a stand-off distance of 3 m.

== Variants ==
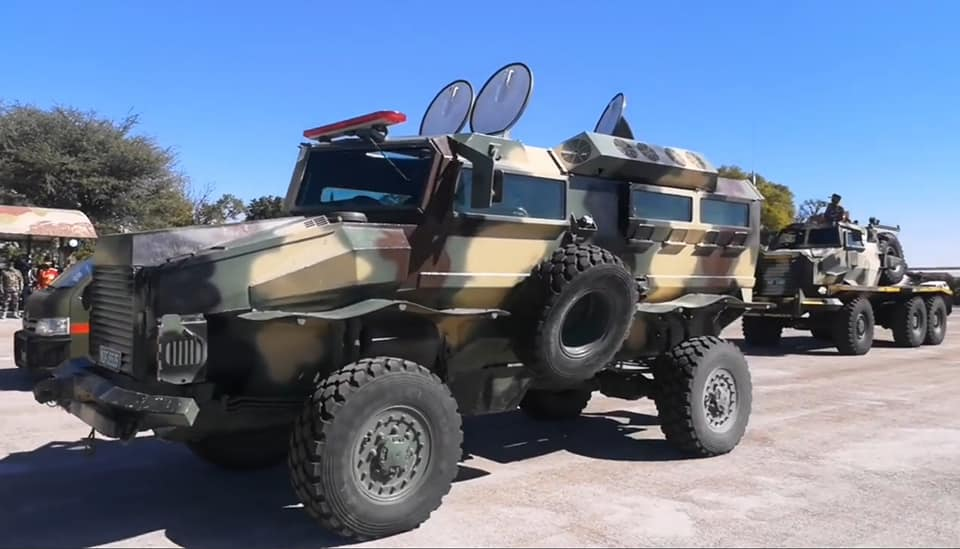
Wer'wolf MKII Mine Protected Ambulance

Apart from the primary APC role, the vehicle was designed for use in other roles including:

- Ambulance
- Anti aircraft artillery role
- Infantry fighting vehicle – an APC configuration armed with a 2A28 Grom 73mm gun
- VIP transport
- Freight logistics vehicle
- Multiple rocket launcher
- Recovery vehicle
- Water/Diesel tanker
- Riot control
- Communication vehicle

A variation of the Wolf MKII called a HEC wolf has also been developed by WMF and Henrik Ehlers Consult (HEC).

== See also ==
- Casspir
- Buffalo (mine protected vehicle)
