= Namibian Army =

Land warfare branch of the Namibian armed forces

- Emblem of the Namibian Army
- Founded: 3 September 1990; 35 years ago
- Country: Namibia
- Type: Army
- Part of: Namibian Defence Force
- Garrison/HQ: Grootfontein, Otjozondjupa Region, Namibia
- Anniversaries: 3 September 1990
- Engagements: Caprivi Conflict; Second Congo War; United Nations Mission in Liberia

Commanders
- Commander-In-Chief: Netumbo Nandi-Ndaitwah
- Minister of Defence: Frans Kapofi
- Commander: Major General Aktofel Nambahu

Insignia
- Flag

The Namibian Army is the ground warfare branch of the Namibian Defence Force.

== History ==
Development of Namibia's army was the fastest of the three arms of service. The first units of the Army were deployed as early as 1990. The Army was formed when the two former enemies South West African Territorial Force and the People's Liberation Army of Namibia were inducted after Namibia's independence into the newly created Namibian Defence Force.

== Role ==
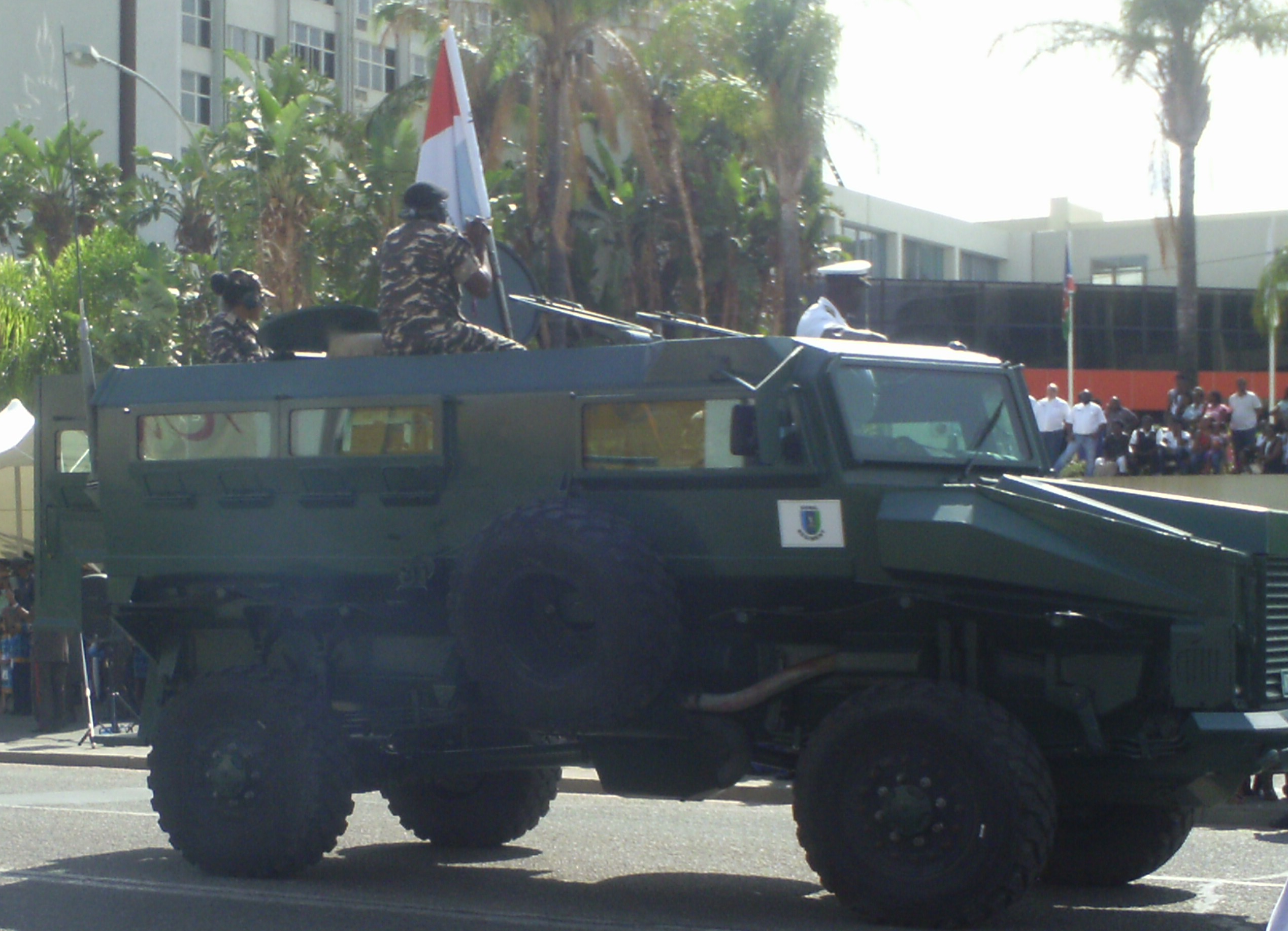
Wer'wolf MKII on parade in downtown Windhoek on 20 March 2015 during Namibia's Independence celebrations

The Ministry of Defence has outlined the Army policy as follows:

"The Army's principal roles will continue to be as already outlined in the defence policy. The Army will strive to maximise its operational effectiveness through the recruitment of the best young men and women who wish to pursue a military career, their effective training and employment. The Army's equipment priorities are improved troop-lift capacity (road and air); engineer, artillery, anti-tank and air defence and communication systems: the aim being to create a secure, integrated, efficient and cost-effective systems." "The Army will remain a well-disciplined and accountable, professional (all volunteer) force; it will include development of a Reserve; it will continue to train along the lines of other Commonwealth armies; it will train with other Namibian forces (such as the police) to rehearse plans for aid to the civil authorities, civil ministries and civil community; and it will promote a good public image and contribute to the communities in which it is based."

== Organisation ==
The Army is a hierarchical organisation, with the Army commander exercising overall command. The Army headquarters are located at Grootfontein military base, a former SADF logistics base.

== Deployments ==
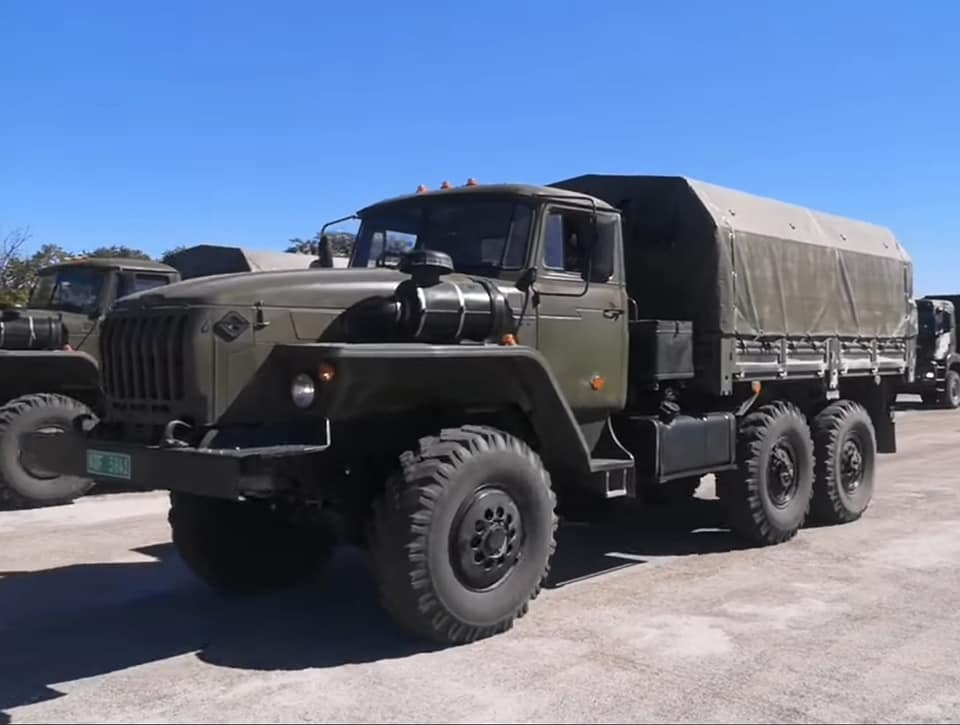
Ural Logistics Truck

=== Local deployments ===
The Namibian Army had a convoy service on Namibia's Trans Caprivi Highway which runs from Otavi, Grootfontein, Rundu, Katima Mulilo until Ngoma border post on the Namibia and Botswana border. The convoy system ran twice daily between Bagani and Kongola in the then Caprivi region. The convoy system was run from 2000 till 2002.

=== SADC deployments ===
Angola (Operation Mandume ya Ndemufayo)
The Namibian Army also deployed troops to help fight UNITA insurgents active in and around the Kavango region. The operation codenamed Mandume ya Ndemufayo was a response to UNITA attacks on Namibian citizens. The Namibian cross-border pursuit operations were carried out with consent of the Angolan government. At least two soldiers were killed in operation Mandume ya Ndemufayo. In an operation between 30 January 2001 to 14 February 2001 an estimated 19 UNITA rebels were killed while various weaponry such as anti-tank and anti-personnel landmines, and assault rifles ranging from AK-47 and R-1s were recovered. In a joint operation with the Angolan Armed Forces, the Namibian Defence Force in May 2001 helped dislodge UNITA from Mavinga in May 2001.

Democratic Republic of the Congo (Operation Atlantic)
The Namibian Army deployed a battle group during the Second Congo War that numbered about 2000 troops and consisted of Infantry, Artillery, Signals, and Air Force Detachments. The first commander of the battle group was Brigadier James Auala. About 30 Namibian Serviceman died in the DRC operations. The Operation was Code named Atlantic . The SADC coalition force commander was always a Zimbabwean and deputy force commander a Namibian, and the Chief of Staff was an Angolan. 11 Namibian soldiers were held as prisoners of war in Rwanda, they were released in June 2000. The soldiers were captured in April 1999 in the Lusambo area which is about 120 kilometers east of Mbuji-Mayi. In January 2001 after Laurent-Désiré Kabila's death the Namibian army contingent was reinforced to not only provide security to Heads of States at the funeral but also to reinforce the SADC contingents in Kinshasa and Lubumbashi. Namibia was also the first foreign country to withdraw its troops and by September 2001 all Namibian soldiers had been withdrawn. Seven soldiers who have been missing in action have since been declared dead. The seven had gone missing around the Deya River close to Kabalo, Deya-Katutu, and Lusambo areas. 137 soldiers that had survived the encirclement during the siege of Ikela were presented with commendation medals. The siege at Ikela left five soldiers killed and many other wounded.

=== UN deployments ===
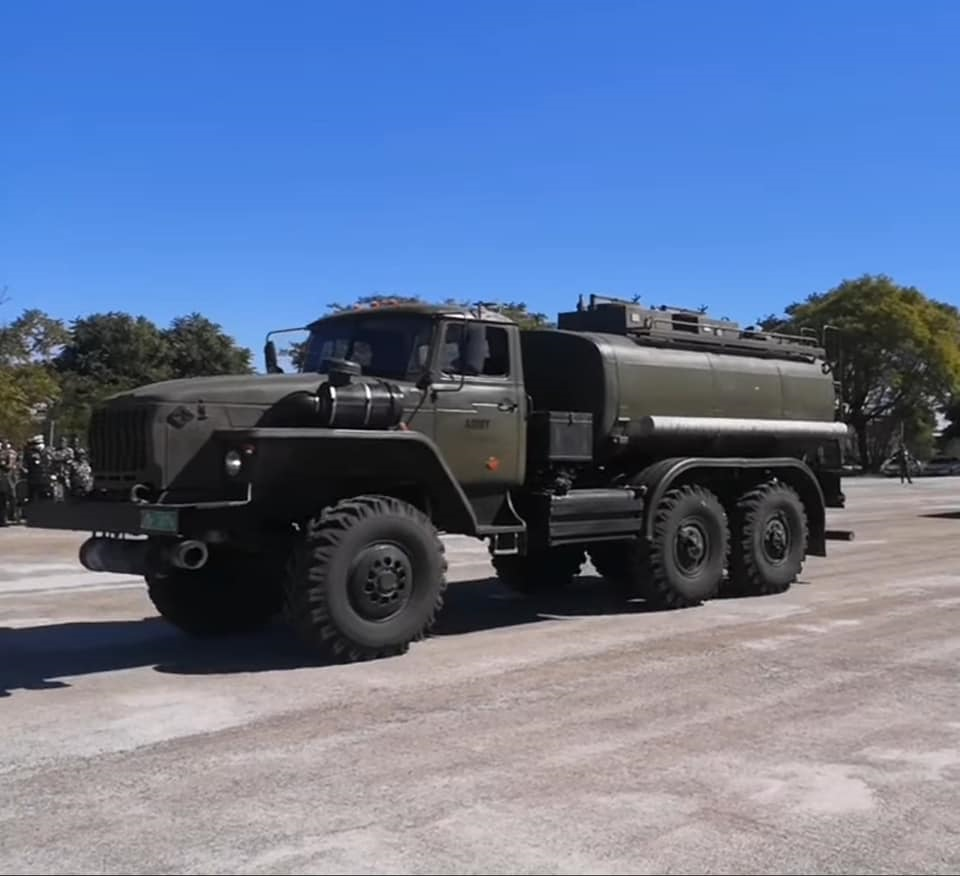
Ural fuel Truck

- UNAMIC - The army deployed a company-sized unit to UNAMIC.
- United Nations Angola Verification Mission III (UNAVEM III)
- MONUA
- United Nations Mission in Liberia (UNMIL)

For the peacekeeping operation in Liberia the Namibian Army contribution was known as Namibian Battalion (NAMBATT) and about 800 infantry troops per NAMBATT contingent were mustered to form a battalion for this operation. Troops were rotated and rotations numbered up to NAMBATT V. A NAMBATT contingent commanding officer stated his unit was to comprise "two Mot Inf Coys, two rifle companies, headquarters company, and fire support company while the battalion is equipped with 10 Wolf APC's, 12 Casspir APC's and 11 WER Wolf APC's".

== Unit structure ==
The standard operational units are structured according to the British commonwealth system:

Type of unit	Division	Brigade	Battalion / Regiment	Company / Squadron	Platoon / Troop	Section
Contains	2–3 Brigades	3–5 Battalions	5–7 Companies	3 Platoons	3 Sections	2 Fire Teams
Personnel	10,000	5,000	550–900	120	30	8–10
Commanded by	Maj-Gen	Brig-Gen	Lt Col	Maj	Capt, Lt or 2nd Lt	Cpl

== Formations and Units ==
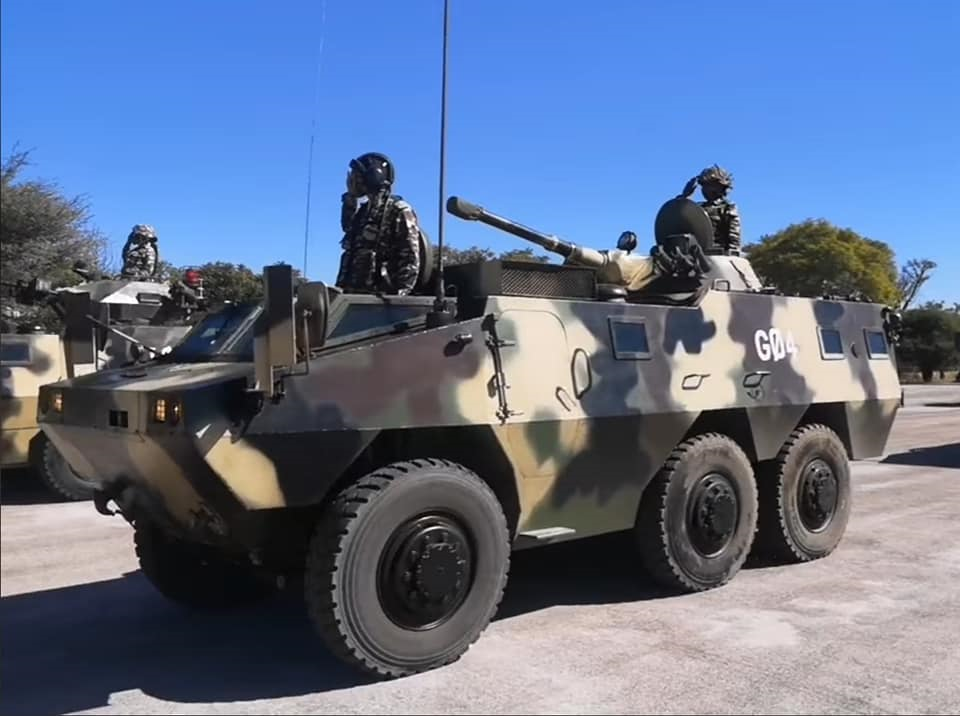
WZ-523 IFV

Air Defence Corps

- Air Defence Brigade

Artillery Corps

- 4 Artillery Brigade (Otjiwarongo)
  - 12 Artillery Regiment
  - 44 Artillery Regiment
  - 46 Artillery Regiment
  - 21 Artillery Regiment
  - 26th Artillery Regiment

Infantry Corps

- 21 Motorised Infantry Brigade
  - 21st Guard Battalion
  - 211 Battalion
  - 212 Battalion
  - 213 Mechanized Infantry Battalion (Windhoek)
- 12 Motorised Infantry Brigade (Keetmanshop)
  - 124 Battalion
  - 125 Battalion (Walvis Bay)
  - 126 Battalion (Gobabis)
- 26 Motorised Infantry Brigade (Grootfontein)
  - 261 Motorized Infantry Battalion (Rundu)
  - 262 Motorized Infantry Battalion (Katima Mulilo)
  - 263 Motorized Infantry Battalion (Oshakati)

Engineer Corps

- Engineer Regiment (Otavi)

Logistics Corps

- Logistic Support Battalion
- Army Peace Support Operations Holding Unit

Provost Corps

- Military Police Battalion (Windhoek)

Reconnaissance Corps

- Recce Regiment

Signals Corps

- Signal Regiment

Training Corps

- Army Battle School Oshivelo

Based at the former Oshivelo SADF training base, transformed into an army battle school.

- Technical Training Centre (TTC)
- Army School of Artillery

Based at the Oluno Military Base, the school is responsible for the training requirement of all soldiers specializing to become artillery gunners.

== Command Structure ==
=== Senior Appointments ===
Sleeve insignia	Appointment	Rank and Name
	Army Commander	Major General Aktofel Nambahu
	Deputy Army Commander	Brigadier General Andreas Diyeve
	General Officer Commanding: 21 Motorised Infantry Brigade	Brigadier General Johannes Shimweetheleni
	General Officer Commanding: 12 Motorised Infantry Brigade	Brigadier General Natanael Endjala
	General Officer Commanding: 26 Motorised Infantry Brigade	Brigadier General Paulus Iipinge
	General Officer Commanding: 4 Artillery Brigade	Brigadier General
	General Officer Commanding: Air Defence Brigade	Brigadier General Patrick Owen Orange

== Army equipment ==
=== Small arms ===
Name	Image	Caliber	Type	Origin	Notes
Pistols
Makarov PM		9×18mm	Semi-automatic pistol	Soviet Union	
CZ-75		9×19mm	Semi-automatic pistol	Czechoslovak Socialist Republic	
Browning Hi-Power		9×19mm	Semi-automatic pistol	Belgium	
Submachine guns
Sten		9×19mm	Submachine gun	United Kingdom	
Sterling		9×19mm	Submachine gun	United Kingdom	
PP-19 Vityaz		9×19mm	Submachine gun	Russia	
Rifles
SKS		7.62×39mm	Semi-automatic rifle	Soviet Union	
AK-103		7.62×39mm	Assault rifle	Russia	
AK-105		5.45×39mm	Carbine Assault rifle	Russia	
Lee-Enfield		.303 British	Bolt-action rifle	British Empire	
Sniper rifles
Mosin-Nagant		7.62×54mmR	Bolt-action; Sniper rifle	Russian Empire	
SVD		7.62×54mmR	Designated marksman rifle Sniper rifle	Soviet Union	
Machine guns
RPK		7.62×39mm	Squad automatic weapon	Soviet Union	
RPK-74		5.45×39mm	Squad automatic weapon	Soviet Union	
PKP Pecheneg		7.62×54mmR	General-purpose machine gun	Russia	
FN MAG		7.62×51mm	General-purpose machine gun	Belgium	
NSV «Utyos»		12.7×108mm	Heavy machine gun	Soviet Union	
Kord		.50 BMG	Heavy machine gun	Russia	
KPV		14.5×114mm	Heavy machine gun	Soviet Union	
Browning M2		.50 BMG	Heavy machine gun	United States	
Rocket propelled grenade launchers
RPG-7		40mm	Rocket-propelled grenade	Soviet Union	
RPG-75		68mm	Rocket-propelled grenade	Czechoslovak Socialist Republic	
Grenade launchers
GP-25		40mm	Grenade launcher	Soviet Union	
AGS-30		30×29mm	Automatic grenade launcher	Russia	
QLZ-87		35×32mm	Automatic grenade launcher	China	

==== Anti-tank weapons ====
Name	Image	Type	Origin	Caliber	Notes
B-10		Recoilless rifle	Soviet Union	82mm	
9M133 Kornet		Anti-tank missile	Russia		

=== Vehicles ===
Vehicles of the Namibian Army are made up of a variety of suppliers including those from the former Soviet Union, Russia, Brazil, China, Japan, Germany & South Africa. Some vehicles were donated by SWAPO, formerly a liberation movement which later became the ruling party of the country at independence, and SWATF, the security force of the then South West Africa administration. The army has received WZ523 Infantry Fighting Vehicles from China which serve with mechanized infantry units. These vehicles are supplemented by the Namibian made Wolf series of MRAPs. South African made Casspirs are also in service which were inherited from the South-West Africa Territorial Force. To enhance mobility it was announced that the Army will receive the Agrale Marruá which appeared at the 25th Independence celebration parade in 2015.

==== Tanks ====
Name	Image	Type	Origin	Quantity	Status	Notes
T-54		Medium tank	Soviet Union	7		

==== Scout cars ====
Name	Image	Type	Origin	Quantity	Status	Notes
BRDM-2		Amphibious armored scout car	Soviet Union	12		

==== Armored personnel carriers ====
Name	Image	Type	Origin	Quantity	Status	Notes
BTR-60		Amphibious Armored personnel carrier	Soviet Union	10		
WZ-523		Armored personnel carrier	China	21		IFV Versions armed with 2A28 Grom.
Milkor Bushcat		Armored personnel carrier	South Africa	+5		In various versions including, APC, Command and Electronic Warfare

==== Mine-Resistant Ambush Protected ====
Name	Image	Type	Origin	Quantity	Status	Notes
Wer'wolf MKII		MRAP	Namibia	400		Versions include APC,Command, Freight, Recovery, Ambulance and Anti Aircraft Zu-23-2 and IFV versions armed with a 2A28 Grom
Casspir		MRAP	South Africa South Africa	20		Variants include, APC, Recovery (Gemsbok), Tanker (Duiker) and Logistics (Blesbok)

==== Utility vehicles ====
Name	Image	Type	Origin	Quantity	Status	Notes
Agrale Marruá		Light Utility Vehicle	Brazil	141		Being assembled locally.
Toyota Hilux		Utility vehicle	Japan	Unknown		
Toyota Land Cruiser		Utility vehicle	Japan	Unknown		
Dongfeng EQ2050		Utility Vehicle	China			Used as part of the CS/SM1 Self propelled Mortar System
Trucks
Ural-375		Utility Truck	Soviet Union	Unknown		
Unimog 435		Ambulance	Germany	Unknown		
Ural-4320		Utility Truck	Russia	183		Delivered in October 2015.
MAN KAT1		Utility Truck	West Germany	Unknown		
XC2200		Utility Truck	China	Unknown		
Steyr 91		Utility Truck	Austria	Unknown		
SAMIL 100		Utility Truck	South Africa; Germany	160		Donated by South Africa in the late 1990s. With German Motors

=== Artillery ===
Artillery is also dominated by Soviet/Russian and Chinese weapons. They have been supplemented by 24 G2 artillery donated by South Africa.

Name	Image	Type	Origin	Quantity	Status	Notes
Rocket artillery
BM-21 Grad		Multiple rocket launcher	Soviet Union	5		-
9P138 "Grad-1		Multiple rocket launcher	Soviet Union	3		
PHL-81		Multiple rocket launcher	China			
Type 63 multiple rocket launcher		Multiple rocket launcher	China			
Field artillery
ZiS-2		Anti-tank gun	Soviet Union	6		
ZiS-3		Field gun	Soviet Union	12		
QF-25		Howitzer	United Kingdom	8		
G2		Howitzer	United Kingdom; South Africa	24		

=== Anti aircraft weapons ===
Air defence equipment of the Army is also made up of Russian and Chinese weaponry.

Name	Image	Type	Origin	Quantity	Status	Notes
FB-6A		Short range Air Defence System	China			
FN-6A		MANPADS	China			
ZPU-4		Anti-aircraft gun	Soviet Union	40		
ZU-23-2		Autocannon	Soviet Union	12		
9K32 Strela-2		MANPADS	Soviet Union			

==== Unmanned Aerial Vehicles ====
Unmanned Aerial Vehicles
Name	Image	Origin	Role	Number	Notes
Aisheng ASN-209		China	Intelligence, Surveillance & Reconnaissance	Classified	unveiled in June 2025
JOUAV CW-30E		China	Intelligence, Surveillance & Reconnaissance	Classified	unveiled in June 2025

== Special Forces ==
The Army commandos and airborne paratroopers are part of the Namibian Special Forces.

== Ranks and insignia ==
Army ranks are based on Commonwealth ranks. The highest rank in peace time a commissioned officer can attain in the army is major general. There may, however, be an exception when an army officer is appointed as Chief of the Defence Force, for which the individual will ascend to the lieutenant general. The highest rank an enlisted member can attain is warrant officer class 1.

=== Commissioned officer ranks ===
The rank insignia of commissioned officers.

Rank group	General / flag officers				Senior officers			Junior officers
Namibian Army
Namibian Army	General	Lieutenant general	Major general	Brigadier general	Colonel	Lieutenant colonel	Major	Captain	Lieutenant	Second lieutenant

=== Other ranks ===
The rank insignia of non-commissioned officers and enlisted personnel.

Rank group	Senior NCOs				Junior NCOs		Enlisted
Namibian Army							No insignia
Namibian Army	Warrant officer class 1	Warrant officer class 2	Staff sergeant	Sergeant	Corporal	Lance corporal	Private (or equivalent)
