= Leaders of Ovamboland =

Ovamboland, or Ovambo, was a Bantustan or "homeland" and later a second-tier authority in South West Africa for the Ovambo people during the apartheid period.

== Leaders ==
(Dates in italics indicate de facto continuation of office.)

Tenure	Incumbent	Affiliation	Notes
Ovamboland
2 October 1968 to 14 January 1972	Uushona Shiimi, Chief Councillor
1972 to 1 May 1973	Fillemon Elifas Shuumbwa, Chief Councillor
Ovamboland (Self-Rule)
1 May 1973 to 16 August 1975	Fillemon Elifas Shuumbwa, Chief Minister
16 August 1975 to July 1980	Cornelius Tuhafeni Ndjoba, Chief Minister		acting to 26 August 1975
Representative Authority of the Ovambos (second-tier authority)
July 1980 to October 1981	Cornelius Tuhafeni Ndjoba, Chairman of the Executive Committee
October 1981 to May 1989	Peter Kalangula, Chairman of the Executive Committee	CDA

== Political affiliation ==
CDA - Christian Democratic Action for Social Justice

== See also ==
- Namibia
- Ovambo people
- Bantustans in South West Africa
- Apartheid
- Presidents of Namibia
- Prime Ministers of Namibia
- Democratic Co-operative Party
