= Tuliameni Kalomoh =

Namibian politician

George Tuliameni Kalomoh (born 18 February 1948) is a Namibian politician and diplomat. He is a former ambassador of SWAPO to India, ambassador of Namibia to the United States of America, assistant secretary-general in the United Nations, and deputy minister of foreign affairs.

== Early years ==
Kalomoh was born at Onamutai, Oshana Region in 1948. He started lower primary school at St. Cutherbert's Parish in Onamutai and continued at Christ the King, Onekwaya West from 1962 to 1966; Both schools were run by the Anglican Church in South West Africa. He joined the SWAPO party in 1964. He attended St. Mary's Odibo High School in 1970. Together with other students, he was expelled following involvement in a dispute with the church leadership.

=== Political activism ===
Following his expulsion from school, Kalomoh went to work as a time clerk for Metal Box Company in Walvis Bay from 1970 to 1971. He was arrested in 1971, severely tortured and then deported to what was then called Ovamboland, due to involvement in SWAPO Youth League political activities.

On about 4 August 1971, Kalomoh joined thousands of students throughout the Northern region in a demonstration at the Ondangwa Native Commission offices welcoming the judgment of the International Court of Justice (ICJ) at The Hague, declaring South African occupation of Namibia illegal and ordering it to withdraw its administration from the territory. In 1972, he was among SWAPO organizers of a mass demonstration at Ondangwa to welcome Kurt Waldheim, secretary-general of the United Nations who visited Namibia to consult the South African Government and internal SWAPO leaders on the implementation of the ICJ ruling. From 1972 to 1973, Kalomoh worked as a teller for the Bantu Investment Cooperation Bank (BBK) at Oshakati, and branch manager at Onesi, Ohangwena and Ondangwa, respectively.

His participation with thousands of SWAPO members at a demonstration in August 1973, led by John Ya Otto in solidarity with SWAPO leaders who were being detained for allegedly having violated the emergency proclamation R17 (which prohibited the holding of public meetings or a gathering of more than five people) led to his detention at Ondangwa overcrowded police cells for 4 months. While in detention, Kalomoh was allowed to pursue his studies for Form III through correspondence with a South African distant education school and wrote examinations at Ongwediva in November 1973. Kalomoh was appointed by Anglican Bishop Richard Wood as secretary and treasurer for St Mary's Hospital, Odibo in January 1974 until August 1974, when the hospital was closed down by the South West Africa White Administration, after some teaching and nursing staff and students at Odibo left for Zambia to join the liberation movement. Kalomoh joined them as part of the "Group of 74".

=== Exile ===
In 1975, Kalomoh was assigned to the office of the administrative secretary of SWAPO in Lusaka, Moses ǁGaroëb, as an administrative assistant. From 1976 to 1981, Kalomoh was appointed SWAPO chief representative to West Africa and based in Dakar, Senegal. He received military training at PLAN's Tobias Hainyeko Training Center in Lubango, Angola in 1980. From 1981 to 1986, Kalomoh was appointed the first SWAPO chief representative to France following the victory of the Socialist Party under president François Mitterrand who invited SWAPO and African National Congress (ANC) to open offices in France.

== Return to Namibia ==
=== Pre-Independence ===
During Namibia's independence election campaign in 1989, Kalomoh was appointed senior advisor to the election director in the northern region, Mzee Kaukungwa based at Oshakati. He was also appointed chief counting agent for SWAPO during counting and tabulation of election results at Ongwediva. Since the northern region constituted an important SWAPO political power base the results from the Ongwediva counting center proved critical for the SWAPO victory in the 1989 elections.

Kalomoh graduated, with a Diploma from the Indian Academy of International Law and Diplomacy in New Delhi which he attended from 1986 to 1989.

=== Diplomatic career ===
From 1986 to 1990, Kalomoh was appointed first SWAPO ambassador to India with full diplomatic privileges and immunities when that country became the first to accord SWAPO full diplomatic status.

In his capacity of under-secretary for political and economic affairs Kalomoh accompanied prime minister Hage Geingob to the United Nations to attend the special session of the UN General Assembly for Namibia's admission to the world body in April 1990. He also accompanied president Sam Nujoma to Southern African Development Community (SADC) Summit in Lusaka, Zambia for Namibia's admission to SADC and to the Organization of African Unity (OAU) summit in Addis Abeba, Ethiopia for Namibia's admission.

In 1991, he was appointed Namibia's first ambassador to the United States of America with concurrent accreditation as High Commissioner to Canada, until 1996. He was appointed special representative of United Nations secretary-general Kofi Annan to Liberia in 1997. He organized the elections in Liberia, which ended the seven-year bloody civil conflict in that country. On completion of the Liberian mission, Kalomoh returned to his position of permanent secretary at the Ministry of Foreign Affairs.

From 1998 to 1999, Kalomoh led Namibia's delegation to peace talks on Democratic Republic of the Congo (DRC) in Lusaka involving the DRC government, and the Rebel Movements on the one hand, the government of Rwanda and Uganda supporting the rebels and those of Angola, Namibia and Zimbabwe supporting the government of DRC on the other hand. The talks culminated in the signing of the Lusaka Protocol of August 1999 which ushered in the peace process in DRC and the deployment of the UN peace-keeping force in 2000.

In 2002, Kalomoh was appointed by UN secretary-general Kofi Annan as assistant secretary-general in the Department of Political Affairs responsible for Africa and the UN Security Council. In 2005, Kalomoh led a UN inter-departmental delegation to Burundi for consultation with political leaders, civil society representatives and ordinary citizens on the feasibility of establishing a special tribunal to investigate and prosecute those accused of committing war crimes, crimes against humanity and genocide, and to promote reconciliation. His last mediation mission was to Somalia to help the Federal Transition Government reconcile with moderate elements of the Union of Islamic Courts. The mission was unsuccessful because the parties were not ready to compromise. Kalomoh retired from the United Nations in May 2007 at the end of secretary-general Kofi Annan's mandate.

=== Political career ===
After independence Kalomoh was assigned to help establish the new Ministry of Foreign Affairs. He was appointed under-secretary for political and economic affairs. In 1996 he became the ministry's permanent secretary. In 1998, was appointed deputy minister of foreign affairs. Between 1999 and 2000, he became acting minister when Theo-Ben Gurirab was elected president of the United Nations General Assembly.

In 2000 he became a voting member of parliament after being elected on SWAPO's party list. He served until 2002, also as deputy minister of foreign affairs, before taking up his UN assistant secretary-general assignment.

=== Awards and recognition ===
In March 2008, Kalomoh was appointed special advisor on foreign affairs. On Heroes' Day 2014 he was conferred the Excellent Order of the Eagle, Second Class.
