= Epinga =

- Settlement
- Location in Namibia
- Coordinates: 17°25′0″S 16°25′0″E
- Country: Namibia
- Region: Ohangwena Region
- Constituency: Omundaungilo Constituency
- Elevation: 3,652 ft (1,113 m)
- Time zone: UTC+2 (South African Standard Time)

Epinga is a village and a former Anglican mission in Ohangwena Region, Namibia. It belongs to the Omundaungilo electoral constituency and is part of the former Ovamboland bantustan. Notable residents include military commanders Julius Shaambeni Shilongo Mnyika and Peter Mweshihange. Artist John Muafangejo spent his teenage years at the village's Anglican mission station.

On 30 January, 1972, it was the site of the murder of four worshippers of St. Luke's Church by South African authorities, witnessed by Bishop Colin Winter.
