= Edward Morrow =

Edward Sydney Morrow (1934–2003) Anglican priest and anti-apartheid activist in Namibia, England, Swaziland, Zimbabwe and South Africa.

== Biography ==
Morrow was born in Brakpan, Transvaal on 30 July 1934, the youngest of seven children. He trained as a quantity surveyor and architectural draughtsman, and worked in Durban for the construction firm Murray & Roberts. He and his wife Laureen were active members of the parish of St Barnabas, on the Bluff in Durban.

In 1970 Bishop Colin Winter, of what was then known as the Diocese of Damaraland, and later the Diocese of Namibia, spoke at a meeting in Durban, and said that people were needed to help the Anglican Church in Namibia. Ed Morrow said he doubted whether he could help, as he was just a builder, but Bishop Winter encouraged him to go anyway. He and his wife Laureen Morrow put some of their furniture into storage, sold some more, and bought a second-hand Volkswagen Kombi with the proceeds, packed the remaining furniture into it, and set off for Windhoek, 1800 kilometres away.

On arrival, they established a building firm. They wanted to call it "Ikon Construction", but the registrar of companies said the name was already taken, so they turned it around and called it "Noki Construction", with a share capital of 200 shares at R1.00 each. The diocese owned 198 shares, Ed owned one, and the diocesan treasurer owned one.

Clergy in Ovamboland were asked to recommend three people from their parishes who wanted to learn the building trade, and three young men joined the firm. They undertook various building projects for the diocese and outside work as well. At his report to the Diocesan Synod in 1971 Ed Morrow noted that they paid three times the going rate for building workers in Windhoek, and were respected in town for quoting fair prices and doing a good job, which showed that it was possible to run a business on Christian lines and still make a profit.

Ed Morrow later went to England to train to be a priest at Queen's College, Edgbaston, Birmingham, and had barely finished his training when he was recalled to Namibia as Vicar General after the deportation of Bishop Richard Wood in June 1975. Three years later he was himself deported from Namibia, and then went to work in the Anglican Diocese of Swaziland at the Usuthu mission. He and his wife Laureen visited Zimbabwe for the independence celebrations in 1980, and were asked to return to help rebuild after the Chimurenga, the war of liberation, and for the next few years he was back in the building trade.

In 1984 Ed Morrow and Laureen moved to Sabie, in the Anglican Diocese of Pretoria, but a couple of years later they were asked by the Namibian churches to set up an ecumenical pastoral care centre for Namibian exiles in Europe, and so moved to Islington, in London. When Namibia became independent he became vicar of St Thomas's, Stamford Hill, in London, and chaplain of Bromley College, a home for retired clergy.

He died on August 13, 2003, of natural causes.
