= Frans Indongo =

Namibian businessman and former politician

- Born: 15 January 1936 (age 90); Ovamboland, South West Africa
- Citizenship: Namibian

Frans "Aupa" Indongo (born 15 January 1936) is a Namibian businessman and former politician. He owns Continental Enterprises, Frans Indongo Group of Companies, Frans Indongo Trust and various shares in mining and fishing companies in Namibia. He is the father-in-law of lawyer Sisa Namandje and northern prominent banker Wosman Hamukonda.

== Business career ==
Indongo opened his first business, which made bricks, in the late 1950s. With the profits from that business, he bought sewing equipment for cloth making, which he sold in Oranjemund. In 1961, he opened a small shop in Omusimboti in Ovamboland (today Oshana Region) which eventually allowed him to open a chain of supermarkets across the country. Indongo owns a large number of properties across Namibia, including locations in Swakopmund, Tsumeb, Walvis Bay, Otjiwarongo and Windhoek as well as holdings in the sugar and fishing industries.

== Political career ==
Indongo entered politics in the 1970s as a leading member of the National Democratic Party, which became part of the Democratic Turnhalle Alliance following the completion of the Turnhalle Constitutional Conference in 1977. At the Turnhalle Conference, Indongo was an important member of the Ovamboland delegation. He was Minister of Economic Affairs in the Owambo legislative assembly from 1975 and from 1980 a Minister in the Owambo Second Tier Representative Authority. In 1982, he was a founding member of the Christian Democratic Action for Social Justice, led by Peter Kalangula. He resigned from politics in the late 1980s to manage his business affairs.

== Honours ==
In 2001, Indongo received an honorary doctorate in business administration from the University of Namibia. In 2003, a street was named after him in downtown Windhoek.

=== See also ===
- Monica Kalondo
- Sven Thieme
