= Ponhele ya France =

Namibian politician

Ponhele Andrew Mbidi ya France (8 January 1948 in Epuku, Ohangwena Region - 8 February 2010 in Windhoek) was a Namibian politician and trade unionist. A longtime member of SWAPO, ya France was elected into the National Assembly of Namibia from 2000 to 2005. He was head of the Namibian Broadcasting Corporation from 2005 to 2008.

== Early life and exile ==
Ya France attended primary school at Okatope and Onekwaya and secondary school at Odibo. His years at secondary school were interrupted by several periods of contract labour work in Oranjemund, experiences that shaped him politically. In 1974 he decided to go into exile to join the liberation movement.

He received military training in Zambia and in December 1974 was sent to Angola to fight on the Northern Front. In 1976 he went to Leninist Komsomol Higher School in the Soviet Union to take up political studies for one year. After his return to Angola he worked as radio announcer for the liberation station Voice of Namibia in Luanda in 1977 and 1978. At the start of the 1980s he secured a scholarship and took up political science and philosophy at the Karl Marx University in East Germany. He graduated in 1985 with a Master's degree.

== Return to Namibia ==
In the late 1980s ya France worked in Angola in different management positions in SWAPO and the Pan African Youth Movement. Shortly before Namibian independence in March 1990 he returned from exile. He helped establish the new Ministry of Labour but in 1993 took over the presidency of the National Union of Namibian Workers (NUNW), Namibia's largest labour union. He stayed in that position until becoming a member of the National Assembly in 2000.

In 2004 he was not re-elected to parliament, having been at place 71 on the party list for the 72 seat body. He took over the position of chairman of the board of directors of the Namibian Broadcasting Corporation in 2005. In 2008 he was fired at the initiative of the Minister of Information and Communication Technology, Joel Kaapanda. Ya France was member of SWAPO's Central Committee and special advisor to the Minister of Veterans’ Affairs from its inception to his death.

Ponhele ya France was known for his opposition against worker's exploitation, and for his strong criticism of Namibian land reform, which in his opinion went far too slow. He advocated against the agreed "Willing buyer, willing seller" policy or market reform measures adopted by the SWAPO government, both as president of NUNW and as member of Parliament.

Ya France was married with five children. He died from cancer in February 2010 in Windhoek.
