= Cecil Alderson =

British bishop

Cecil William Alderson
- Bishop of Mashonaland
- Church: Anglican
- Previous posts: Archdeacon of Port Elizabeth (1944–1948); Bishop of Damaraland (1949–1951); Bishop of Bloemfontein (1951–1957)

Personal details
- Born: March 11, 1900
- Died: February 12, 1968 (aged 67)
- Education: Merchant Taylors''; St John's College, Oxford; Ely Theological College

Cecil William Alderson was a British-born Anglican Bishop of (successively) Damaraland, Bloemfontein, and Mashonaland.

== Early life ==
He was born on 11 March 1900, educated at Merchant Taylors' and St John's College, Oxford, and ordained in 1926 after a period of study at Ely Theological College.

== Clerical career ==
He began his career with a curacy at St Matthew, Westminster. From 1925 to 1930 he was Vice-Principal of his old theological college then a missionary in Likoma. In 1938 he became Warden of St Paul's College, Grahamstown, then in 1944 archdeacon of Port Elizabeth. He was bishop of Damaraland from 1949 to 1951 when he was translated to Bloemfontein. His last post was as bishop of Mashonaland where he played a key role in the foundation of the Bernard Mizeki College from around 1958 till the time of his death.

== Honours ==
He was admitted as a Sub-Prelate to the Order of St John of Jerusalem, he died on 12 February 1968.

== Notes ==
Anglican Church of Southern Africa titles
Preceded by Hugh Latimer Gilmore Edwardes	Archdeacon of Port Elizabeth; 1944–1948	Succeeded by Thomas Bertram Powell
Preceded by George Wolfe Robert Tobias	Bishop of Damaraland; 1949–1951	Succeeded by John Dacre Vincent
Preceded by Arthur Henry Howe-Browne	Bishop of Bloemfontein; 1951–1957	Succeeded by Bill Bendyshe Burnett
Anglican Communion titles
Preceded by Edward Francis Paget	Bishop of Mashonaland; 1957–1968	Succeeded by John Paul Burrough
