= Petrus Iilonga =

Namibian politician (1947–2018)

Honourable Petrus Iilonga

Deputy minister of Defence
- In office 4 December 2012 – 20 March 2015
- President: Hifikepunye Pohamba
- Preceded by: Lempy Lucas
- Succeeded by: Billy Mwaningange

Deputy minister of Agriculture, Water and Forestry
- In office 21 March 2010 – 4 December 2012
- President: Hifikepunye Pohamba
- Succeeded by: Lempy Lucas

Deputy minister of Labour and Social Welfare
- In office 21 March 2005 – 21 March 2010
- President: Hifikepunye Pohamba
- Succeeded by: Alpheus Muheua

Deputy minister of Environment and Tourism
- In office 21 March 2000 – 21 March 2005
- President: Sam Nujoma

Personal details
- Born: 8 January 1947 Etilyasa, South West Africa (now Namibia)
- Died: 11 December 2018 (aged 71)
- Party: SWAPO
- Occupation: Politician

Petrus Iilonga (8 January 1947 – 11 December 2018) was a Namibian politician, trade union leader and a political prisoner in Robben Island. A member of the South West Africa People's Organization (SWAPO), Iilonga served as deputy minister in various ministries and was a member of the party's central committee.

== Early life and military career ==
Iilonga was born in Etilyasa, a settlement near Ongandjera in the Omusati Region. He attended primary school there and originally became a farm worker (from 1966). He graduated from Onakaye Boys School in 1969 and from 1970 to 1971 attended Ongwediva Training College to be trained as a motor mechanic. From 1971 he worked on the construction of the Ruacana to Calueque canal and between 1972 and 1973 taught at the Elondo West Combined School. He had a brief spell of work at the Ondangwa government garage before he left to receive military training in Tanzania and the Soviet Union in 1974. He returned to Namibia in 1976 to fight for the People's Liberation Army of Namibia in the Namibian War of Independence. Captured by South African forces, he was imprisoned on Robben Island from 1978 to 1985.

== Trade unionism ==
After his release, Iilonga began mobilizing workers under the National Union of Namibian Workers. He is described as one of three former Robben Island prisoners who were key in the rise of the union in the mid 1980s. Iilonga served as secretary general of the Namibia Public Workers Union (Napwu) from 1988 to 2000. He had founded the union in 1987, though it was legally unable to recruit members until after independence in 1990.

== Political career ==
In 1995, Iilonga became a member of the National Assembly, a position he held until his death in 2018. In 1996, Iilonga received Namibia's Omugulugwombashe Medal for bravery and long service. Iilonga left Napwu when he was appointed deputy minister of Environment and Tourism by Sam Nujoma in 2000. Despite his position in the government he was often a vocal critic of its labor policy, in particular for what he considered the favoring of landowners over farm laborers. In 2004 he was the centre of some controversy for pointing out that a proposed law did not allow for rapes committed by women, only those by men. Iilonga left the department of Environment and Tourism when he was appointed deputy minister of Labour and Social Welfare in 2005.

In a 2008 belated Heroes' Day speech in Keetmanshoop, Iilonga criticized the newly formed opposition Rally for Democracy and Progress for alleged tribalism. In the same speech he said that SWAPO did not support opposition parties. Iilonga was appointed deputy minister of Agriculture, Water and Forestry in 2010. He held that position until 4 December 2012 when he was appointed deputy minister of Defence.

In the 2014 election he was not reelected to Parliament but kept his seat in the central committee. In November 2017 Iilonga missed out on election to the central committee of SWAPO. Iilonga resided in Windhoek and was famous for his "Che Guevara-style" beret and frequent phone-ins to Namibian Broadcasting Corporation radio programmes.
