= Chris Watts (disambiguation) =

Chris Watts may refer to:

- Chris Watts (born 1985), perpetrator of the Watts family murders
- Chris Watts (visual effects artist) (born 1965), American visual effects artist
- Chris H.S. Watts, Australian entomologist
- Christopher Watts (1877–1958), Anglican bishop

== See also ==
- Chris Watt (born 1990), American football player
