= Namibia International Peace Centre =

Non-governmental organization (1974-1981)

The Namibia International Peace Centre was a non-governmental organization which was active between 1974 and 1981. It was based in The Abbey, Sutton Courtenay and later in Bethnal Green, East London. It was established by Bishop Colin Winter (1928–1981), an English Anglican bishop, who served as Bishop of Damaraland, a diocese of the Church of the Province of Southern Africa (now the Anglican Church of Southern Africa) coextensive with the territory of what is now Namibia during the apartheid era. (Note: The diocese of Damaraland (now the diocese of Namibia) was distinct from the smaller bantustan of the same name created by the government of South Africa.) The Namibia International Peace Centre supported SWAPO.

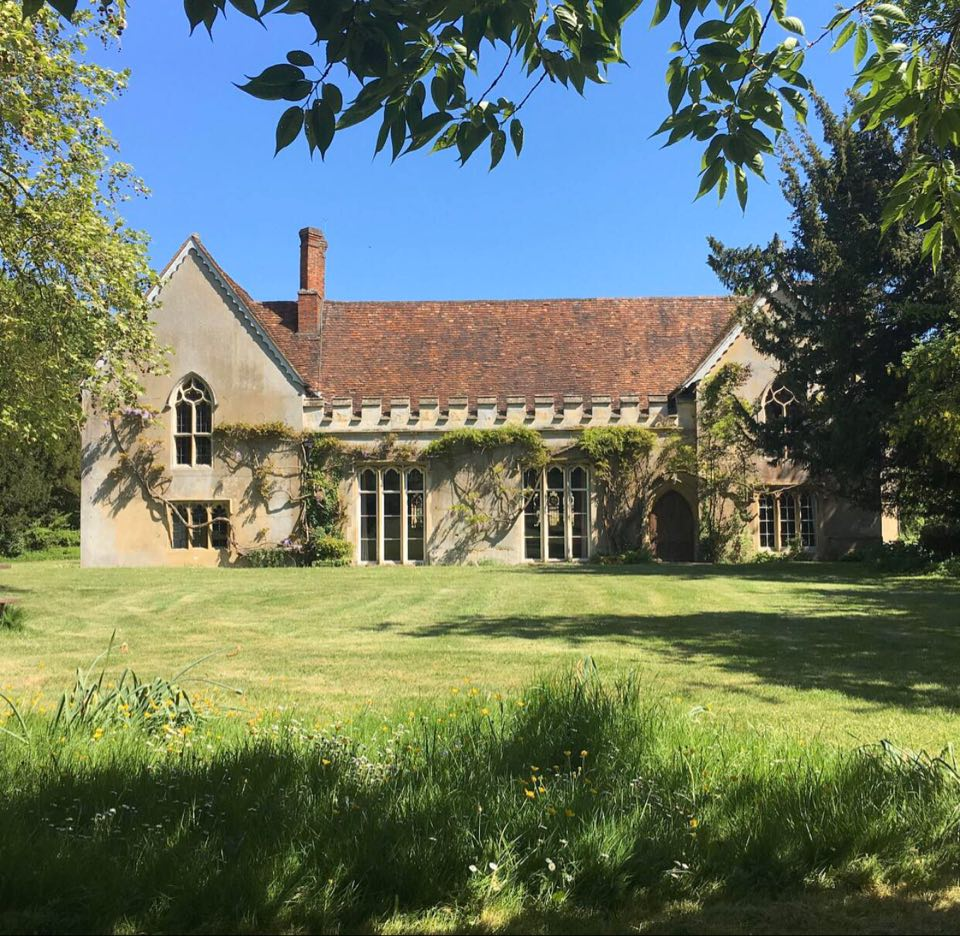
The Abbey, Sutton Courtenay, where the Namibia International Peace Centre was based.

Winter was deported in 1972 for his opposition to South Africa's policy of apartheid. Following his expulsion from Namibia, he remained, at the request of the synod of his diocese, "bishop-in-exile", continuing to speak and write on behalf of independence for Namibia and ordaining clergy to serve there. He was known variously as Bishop of Damaraland(-in-exile) and Bishop of Namibia(-in-exile); during his exile, his eventual successor Kauluma was elected and consecrated suffragan bishop for his diocese. Newspaper publisher David Astor lent Winter The Abbey, Sutton Courtenay that originally belonged to the historic Abingdon Abbey to house the Namibia International Peace Centre. In the United Kingdom, he also became noted for his anti-establishment comments, including a 1978 attack on Prime Minister Margaret Thatcher, then leader of the opposition, as ”the Iron Lady of right-wing aggression.”
