= Indongo =

Indongo is a Namibian surname. Notable people with the surname include:

- Frans Indongo (born 1936), Namibian businessman and politician
- Julius Indongo (born 1983), Namibian professional boxer
