= Voice of Namibia =

Pirate 20th century radio station

Voice of Namibia (VoN) was a pirate radio station propagating Namibian independence, and the political mouthpiece of the South West African People's Organization (SWAPO) during the Namibian War of Independence. It operated from 1966 until Namibian independence in 1990 from different hosting stations in Sub-Saharan Africa.

== Background and establishment ==
After World War I the League of Nations gave South West Africa, formerly a German colony, to the United Kingdom as a mandate under the title of South Africa. When the National Party won the 1948 election in South Africa and subsequently introduced apartheid legislation, these laws also extended into South West Africa which was the de facto fifth province of South Africa.

On 19 April 1960 SWAPO was founded as the successor of the Ovamboland People's Organization that was established in 1959. During 1962 SWAPO had emerged as the dominant nationalist organisation for the Namibian people, co-opting other groups such as the South West Africa National Union (SWANU), and in 1976 the Namibia African People's Democratic Organisation. SWAPO used guerrilla tactics to fight the South African military. On 26 August 1966 the first major clash of the conflict took place, when a unit of the South African Police, supported by South African Air Force, exchanged fire with SWAPO forces at Omugulugwombashe. This date is generally regarded as the start of what became known in South Africa as the Border War.

Voice of Namibia was part of the propaganda wing of SWAPO. It started with a one-hour program called Namibian Hour that was broadcast from Tanzania in 1966. Radio Zambia began relaying the Namibian Hour as from 1973, and the following year the program was renamed Voice of Namibia. Luanda joined the hosting stations in 1976. Further stations hosting Voice of Namibia were Zimbabwe Broadcasting Corporation, the Voice of Revolutionary Ethiopia, and Voice of the Revolution from Congo-Brazzaville.

== Operation and reception ==
VoN was the counter-propaganda station to the South West African Broadcasting Corporation (SWABC), the South African Broadcasting Corporation outpost in South West Africa.

Throughout the 1980s VoN established a network of freelance journalists within South West Africa. Unlike other pirate stations that promoted independence in Sub-Saharan Africa it was thus able to keep contact with the local population, a property that positively influenced its reception in the target territory. Further sources of information for the Voice of Namibia were faxes and telephone calls to its London office, and clandestine courier services to Angola via Ovamboland. When the Namibia Press Agency (NAMPA) was established in 1987 as a press agency of SWAPO, news updates were telexed to all VoN dependencies after being cleared by SWAPO.

Voice of Namibia had a large local audience among the black population, particularly due to technical reasons: Weak local radio offerings before the 1970s had caused the spread of short wave radio sets which were better suited to receive international channels than the FM sets predominant in South Africa. When Radio Owambo, an FM channel destined for the indigenous Ovambo people, was started in 1969, it could not change the already existing regular practice of assessing radio offerings on the short wave band.

== Namibian independence ==
Upon Namibian independence in March 1990, the South West African Broadcasting Corporation (SWABC) was renamed Namibian Broadcasting Corporation (NBC), and VoN was merged into it. The NBC was officially disassociated from SWAPO and declared an independent state broadcaster. However, staff from SWABC stayed on and former SWABC personnel had to be reconciled with returning VoN partisan journalists, which created considerable tensions.

== Notable staff ==
A number of journalists and administrators at VoN became high-ranking politicians after Namibian independence, among them:

- Eddie Amkongo, former ambassador to Ethiopia, as well as the Democratic Republic of the Congo
- Moses ǁGaroëb (1942–1997), Minister of Labour and Human Resources
- Joseph Obgeb Jimmy (1951–2004), Namibia's first High Commissioner to Zambia
- Kazenambo Kazenambo, former Namibian Minister of Youth, National Service, Sport and Culture
- Doreen Sioka, Minister of Labour and Social Welfare
- Ponhele ya France, former president of the National Union of Namibian Workers (NUNW) and former Member of Parliament

== See also ==
- Voice of Zimbabwe
- Voice of the Revolution (Zimbabwe)
- Radio Freedom (South Africa)
