= John Muafangejo =

Namibian artist (1943 – 1987)

John Ndevasia Muafangejo
- Born: 5 October 1943; Etunda lo Nghadi, Angola
- Died: 27 November 1987 (aged 44)
- Occupation: Artist

John Ndevasia Muafangejo (5 October 1943 – 27 November 1987) was a Namibian artist who became internationally known as a maker of woodcut prints. He created linocuts, woodcuts and etchings.

== Biography ==
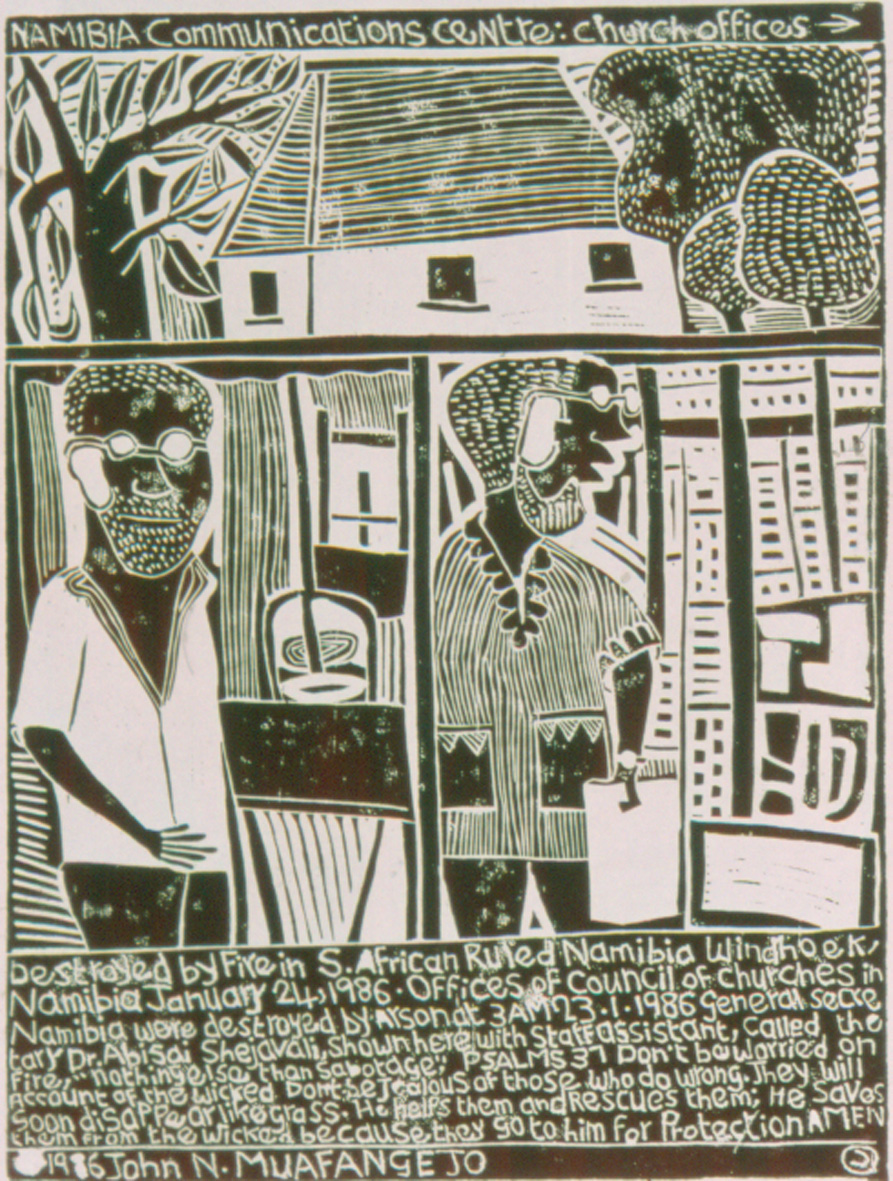
Work of Mufangejo

Muafangejo was born in Etunda lo Nghadi, Angola in 1943. He came from the people of Kwanyama (Kuanjama), who inhabit the northern parts of Ovamboland. As a child, he tended cattle barefoot. In 1955 his father died, leaving his mother, who was one of eight wives, with no assets. His mother converted to Christianity and moved in 1956 to the Anglican mission station in Epinga which lay south of the border in Namibia. In 1957 John followed her there and attended the local missionary school.

At twenty Muafangejo moved to the Holy Cross School of Mission in Onamunhama, then to the St Mary's School in Odibo. He stayed there until 1967. An American missionary named C. S. Mallory supported his artistic talent and helped him with the application to the Arts and Craft Centre of the Evangelical Lutheran Church in Rorke's Drift, Natal in South Africa. The Rorke's Drift Art and Craft Centre was founded in 1962 by the Swedish couple Ulla and Peder Gowenius and played a significant role in the development of South African art in the second half of the 20th century. Here Muafangejo came into contact with different artistic techniques, such as the weaving, woodcarving, painting and pottery. One of his teachers was Azaria Mbatha (b. 1941). He distinguished himself particularly in etching and linocut. In 1968 he suffered a nervous breakdown and was in treatment in the Madadeni Hospital in Newcastle due to a severe depression. After his release he acquired a degree from Rorke's Drift in 1969. From 1970 to the end of 1974 he worked as an art teacher at the mission school in Odibo. In 1974 he was awarded the Artist-in-residence scholarship in Rorke's Drift. In 1975 he returned to Odibo, and in 1977 moved to Windhoek. During 1986–1987 he built a house in the suburb of Katutura. He died suddenly of a heart attack in Katutura Township, Windhoek on 27 November 1987.

== Works ==
He often combines text with images, and his images contain references to the history and culture of the ovaKwanyama. He did not live to see the independence of Namibia, but the violent struggle for it formed the background for his art.

Muafangejo's output contains only ca. 260 different prints. The Namibian Arts Association in Windhoek has a large collection of his works in their Permanent Collection.

== Exhibitions (selection) ==
- 1969 Contemporary African Art Exhibition, Camden Arts Centre, London
- 1972 São Paulo Biennial
- 1975 Arts Centre, Durban (solo exhibition)
- 1976 Black South Africa: Graphic Art, Brooklyn Museum, New York
- 1980 John Muafangejo Graphic Art (solo exhibition), Bullankulma Art Gallery, Helsinki
- 1987 Black Art – John Muafangejo and Peter Clarke, IFA Gallery, Bonn
- 1988 National Arts Festival, Grahamstown (retrospective)

== Literature ==
- Bruce Arnott: John Muafangejo: linocuts, woodcuts and etchings. Linocuts, woodcuts and etchings. Struik, Cape Town/Johannesburg. 1977.
- Theo Sundermeier: Hope for Namibia: linocuts by John Ndevasia Muafangejo. Luther-Verlag, Bielefeld 1991.
- Orde Levinson: I was lonelyness. The complete graphic works of John Muafangejo: a catalog raisonné 1968–1987. Struik Winchester, Cape Town 1992.
- Orde Levinson: The African Dream. Visions of love and sorrow: the Art of John Muafangejo. Thames and Hudson, London 1992.
- Brenda Danilowitz: John Muafangejo picturing history. In: African arts. vol. 26, no. 2 (1993) pp 46–57, 92–94.
- John N. Muafangejo (1943–1987): linocuts from the collection of the National Art Gallery of Namibia: Forum for Cultural Exchange, Institute for Foreign Cultural Relations, Stuttgart, 26 January to 27 March 1994. catalog, text: Annaleen one. Stuttgart, 1994.

Orde, Forcible Love, A play about John Muafangejo presented at the National Theatre of Namibia for Independence Celebrations March 1990.

Orde Levinson: Visions of Love and Sorrow, the Art of John Muafangejo, trilingual publication in English, with Oshikawanyama and German Translations of updated edition of 1992 Thames and Hudson publication. Includes the script of "Forcible Love" and "A Poets Grave". Kuiseb Publishers, [Windhoek], 2020
