= Billy Mwaningange =

Namibian politician

Honourable Billy Mwaningange

Deputy Minister of Defence
- Incumbent
- Assumed office 21 March 2015
- President: Hage Geingob
- Prime Minister: Saara Kuugongelwa-Amadhila
- Preceded by: Petrus Iilonga

Personal details
- Born: November 25, 1945 (age 80) Eembidi, Ovamboland

William Werner Mwaningange (born 25 November 1945) is a Namibian politician who has served in the Cabinet of Namibia as Deputy Minister of Defence since 2015. A member of SWAPO, Mwaningange was elected to the National Assembly of Namibia in the 2009 general election. He previously served as Governor of Ohangwena Region and since 2008 he has been a member of the SWAPO Central Committee.

He was born in Eembidi, Ovamboland, which was also the birthplace of fellow SWAPO politician Erkki Nghimtina. He earned the nickname Comrade Billy during the Namibian War of Independence from occupying South Africa.

On Heroes' Day 2014 he was conferred the Excellent Order of the Eagle, third Class.
