= Mnyika =

Mnyika is a surname. Notable people with the surname include:

- John Mnyika, Tanzanian politician
- Julius Shaambeni Shilongo Mnyika (1938–2003), Namibian guerrilla
