= Peter Mweshihange =

Namibian politician (1930–1998)

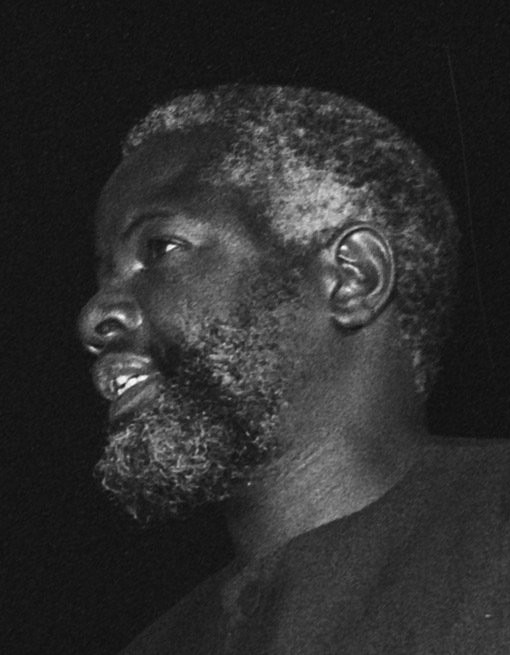

Ambassador to the People's Republic of China
- In office 1996–1998
- President: Sam Nujoma
- Preceded by: position established
- Succeeded by: Hopelong Uushona Ipinge

Minister of Defence
- In office 1990–1995
- President: Sam Nujoma
- Preceded by: position established
- Succeeded by: Philemon Malima

Personal details
- Born: May 5, 1930 Epinga, South West Africa
- Died: March 20, 1998 (aged 67) Windhoek
- Party: SWAPO
- Occupation: Politician and diplomat

Peter Mweshihange (5 May 1930 – 20 March 1998) was a Namibian revolutionary and guerrilla leader, and after Namibian independence, a politician and diplomat. He was Namibia's first Minister of Defence from 1990 to 1995, and first ambassador to the People's Republic of China from 1996 until his death.

== Early life ==
Mweshihange was born as fifth of twenty-five children on 5 May 1930 in Epinga near the border with Angola in former Ovamboland, today Ohangwena Region. In his childhood years, he developed knowledge of the local flora and considered himself to be a traditional healer, using his childhood friends as guinea pigs. He attended St. Mary's Mission School at Odibo from the age of 11, and from the age of 14 he received training to become a teacher. He moved to Tsumeb in 1946 and worked first as truck driver, then as head of transport services at the South West Africa Native Labour Association (SWANLA), the colonial labour hire company of South-West Africa.

Mweshihange was arrested in Rundu in 1954 on his first attempt to go into exile. He was not convicted, but left South-West Africa soon afterwards to work as miner in Johannesburg and as chef for the French consul-general in Cape Town. He joined the resistance movement there and followed Sam Nujoma into Tanganyikan exile in 1960.

== Career ==
=== Exile years ===
The first years in exile Mweshihange furthered his education, studying towards a teacher's training certificate at Kivukoni Training College in Dar es Salaam in 1961 and 1962, and political science and ideology in Ghana in 1963 and 1964. Together with Nujoma he managed SWAPO's administration and resistance strategy, attempting to intensify the struggle for independence. From this attempt emerged the start of armed guerrilla action against the South African occupiers, and in 1966 the Namibian War of Independence started with a South African assault at Omugulugwombashe in northern Namibia.

At that time, Mweshihange was a commander in the People's Liberation Army of Namibia (PLAN), the armed wing of SWAPO. Within the party structure he rose to the position of Secretary of Internal Affairs in 1970 and subsequently went to the Soviet Union to receive military training. In 1986 he became SWAPO's Secretary of Defense, responsible for PLAN's strategy to conduct the War of Independence. He was responsible for supervising PLAN operations during the decisive Battle of Cuito Cuanavale.

=== After Namibian independence ===
Mweshihange was a member of the SWAPO Central Committee and Politburo since the early days of the Ovamboland People's Congress, of which he was a co-founder.

At the time of independence in 1990, Mweshihange was elected as one of the members of the Constituent Assembly of Namibia with SWAPO, and appointed Minister of Defence. In 1996, he became Namibia's first ambassador to the People's Republic of China, a position he held until his death.

He died on 20 March 1998 while on a home visit to Windhoek. Peter Mweshihange was given a state funeral at Windhoek's Old Location Cemetery, and later re-buried at the Namibian National Heroes' Acre. Theo-Ben Gurirab remembered him as a culinary master and "connoisseur of good things in life".
