= Lempy Lucas =

Namibian politician

The Honourable Lempy Lucas MP
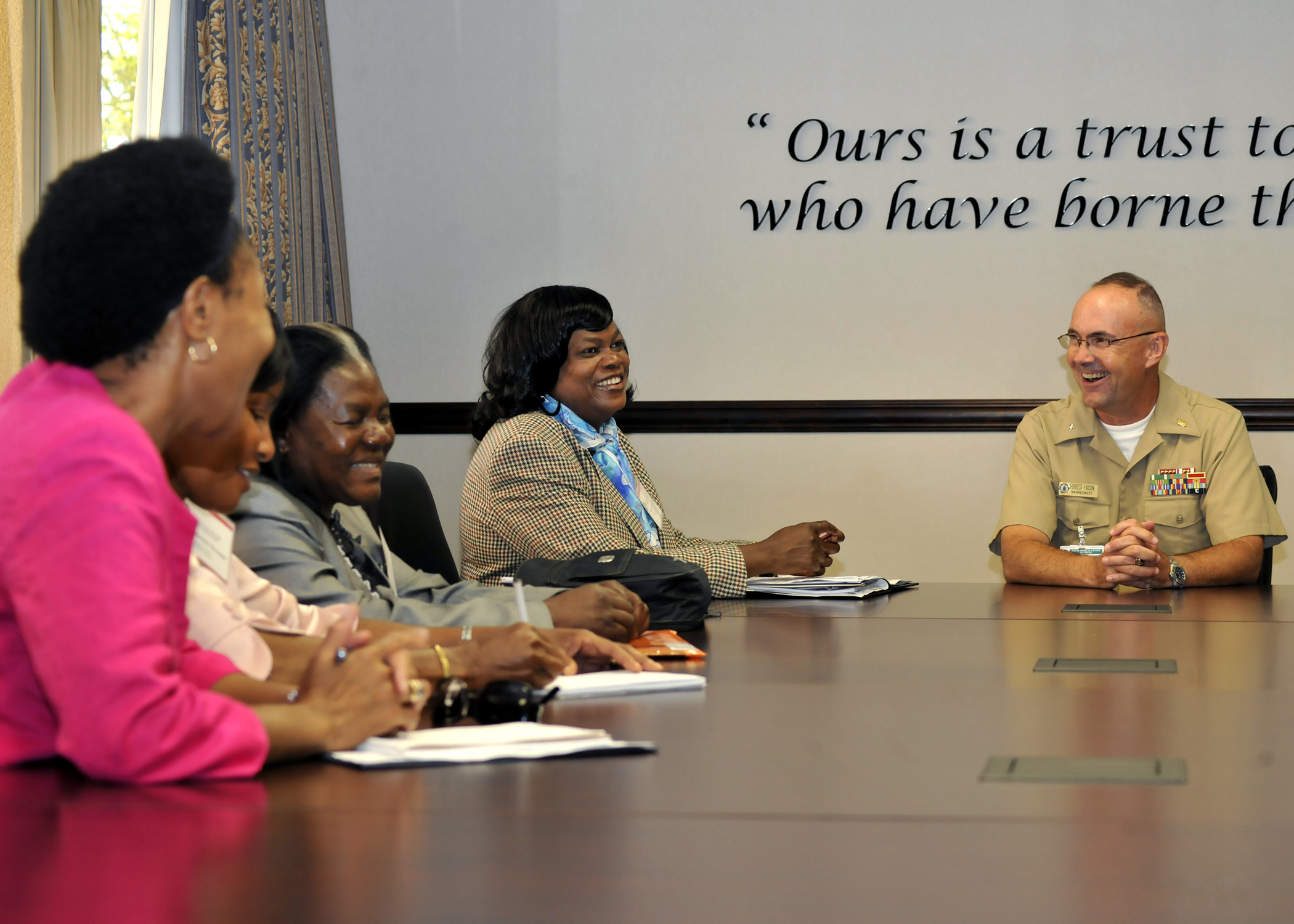
- Lucas, far left

Deputy minister of Agriculture, Water and Forestry
- In office 4 December 2012 – 21 March 2015
- Preceded by: Petrus Iilonga
- Succeeded by: Theo Diergaardt, Anna Shiweda

Deputy minister of Defence
- In office 21 March 2010 – 4 December 2012
- Succeeded by: Petrus Iilonga

Deputy minister of Foreign Affairs
- In office 2004 – 21 March 2010
- Preceded by: Kaire Mbuende

Personal details
- Born: 7 November 1961 (age 64) Eendombe, Omusati Region
- Party: SWAPO
- Occupation: Politician
- Profession: Clerk

Lempy Lucas, also: Lukas, (born 7 November 1961 in Eendombe, Omusati Region) is a Namibian politician. A member of the National Assembly from 2000 until 2015, Lucas is a member of the South West Africa People's Organization (SWAPO). She has held a number of deputy minister positions in Namibia's government between 2004 and 2015. She also was a SWAPO Party Youth League activist.

== Career ==
Lucas joined SWAPO in 1979 and fled shortly thereafter to Angola, where she studied. In 1982, she earned a diploma in youth administration from East Germany. She then returned to Angola in the mid-1980s, where she worked as an administrator at the SWAPO health and education centre at Kwanza-Sul. In 1986 she was reassigned to Luanda, where she worked in the SWAPO headquarters until independence in 1989. From 1990 to 2002, Lucas served as an important figure in the SWAPO Party Youth League. In 1997, she joined the SWAPO central committee. In 2004, she was appointed to the position of deputy foreign minister. She was then a resident of Ohangwena Region.

Following the 2009 parliamentary elections, Lucas was redeployed as deputy minister of Defence. In the Cabinet reshuffle following the fifth SWAPO congress in 2012, Lucas swapped positions with Petrus Iilonga and became the deputy minister of Agriculture, Water and Forestry.

In the 2014 parliamentary elections, Lucas did not gain a seat in parliament. Her portfolio of deputy minister of Agriculture, Water and Forestry was split and taken over by Theo Diergaardt and Anna Shiweda.
