= George Tobias (bishop) =

George Wolfe Robert Tobias MC (1882–1974) was the third Anglican Bishop of Damaraland (Namibia) from 1939 to 1949.

== Biography ==
George Wolfe Robert Tobias was born in 1882, the son of the Reverend Charles Frederick Tobias, Vicar of St. Augustine's, Kimberley (and afterwards Archdeacon of Caledon), and his wife, Ethel Eliza Smith.

He was educated at the Diocesan College (“Bishops”) (1896–1902); at the University of the Cape of Good Hope (BA, and Queen Victoria Scholarship, 1902); at Sidney Sussex College, Cambridge (Scholar; second class, moral science tripos, 1905; first class, history tripos, and BA, 1906; MA, 1910); and at Cuddesdon Theological College (1906–1907).

Made Deacon in 1907, and Priest, on St. Matthew's Day, 21 September 1908, by the Bishop of Wakefield, he served as Curate of King Cross, Halifax, in the diocese of Wakefield, 1907–1910. Thereafter he returned to Cape Town and was licensed as Assistant Priest of St. Mary's, Woodstock on 18 November 1910. In 1915 he joined the ranks of the South African Medical Corpsas a stretcher-bearer, and was wounded at the Battle of Delville Wood in July 1916). He was appointed as a temporary Chaplain to the Forces (South African Overseas Brigade), in 1917, was again wounded, and was awarded the Military Cross for gallantry in the 1918 New Year Honours.

In 1919 he resumed duty in the diocese of Cape Town as an Assistant Priest of St. Mary's, Woodstock in charge of the chapelry of All Saints', Roodebloem; was made Priest-in-charge of All Saints’ Parochial District, Roodebloem in 1921; and was given a general licence to officiate in the diocese of Cape Town during 1923–1924.

In 1924 he founded and was appointed as Priest-in-charge of St. Mary's Mission, Odibo, Ovamboland, in the diocese of Damaraland. The Diocesan College Magazine recorded that "[I]n his early years there when he was without assistance, he acted as builder, carpenter, doctor and dentist. Due to his dedicated enthusiasm the Mission flourished and was extended to other parts."

Tobias was chosen as third Lord Bishop of Damaraland and consecrated as such in St. George's Cathedral, Cape Town, on St. Mark's Day, 25 April 1939 by the Archbishop of Cape Town, assisted by the Bishops of Natal, St. John's Kaffraria, Southern Rhodesia, Kimberley and Kuruman, Pretoria, Johannesburg, Bloemfontein, Zululand, Lebombo, and George, the Coadjutor Bishop of Cape Town, and Bishop Watts.

He resigned his diocese in August 1949 and returned to Cape Town to take up duty as Rector of Simon's Town and later, from 1954, of Hout Bay. He retired from full-time ministry in South Africa in 1956 and was given a Licence to Officiate in the diocese of Canterbury. Returning once again to Cape Town in 1960, he was given a General Licence (effective from 12 August 1960), and moved to live at 8 Rubicon Road in Rondebosch. He died in Pinelands, Cape Town on 3 May 1974.

Tobias is known to have translated The Pilgrim's Progress into Kwanyama, and compiled a Kwanyama dictionary (Tobias, G. W. R. & Turvey, B. H. C. English-Kwanyama dictionary; Johannesburg: Witwatersrand University Press, 1954).

Anglican Communion titles
Preceded by Charles Christopher Watts	Bishop of Damaraland; 1949–1951	Succeeded by Cecil William Alderson
