= Omundaungilo Constituency =

Electoral constituency in the Ohangwena region of northern Namibia

Coordinates: 17°25′S 16°42′E

Omundaungilo constituency (red) in the Ohangwena Region of Namibia

Omundaungilo is an electoral constituency in the Ohangwena Region of Namibia, on the border to Angola. It had 6,642 registered voters in 2020. The constituency office is situated in Omundaungilo.

The constituency covers an area of 618 km^{2} (239 sq mi). It had a population of 7,855 in 2011, down from 8,115 in 2001.

== Politics ==
As is common in all constituencies of former Ovamboland, Namibia's ruling SWAPO Party has dominated elections since independence. In the 2004 regional election SWAPO candidate Festus Ikanda was declared winner after no opposition party nominated a candidate.

It won the 2015 regional election by a landslide. Councillor Ikanda was reelected with 3,012 votes, while the only opposition candidate, Jason Haufiku of the Rally for Democracy and Progress (RDP), received 89 votes. Councillor Ikanda of SWAPO was againreelected in the 2020 regional election. He received 2,800 votes, far ahead of Lamek Nanghalu of the Independent Patriots for Change (IPC), an opposition party formed in August 2020, who obtained 287 votes.
