= Namibia Central Intelligence Service =

Intelligence service of Namibia

The Namibia Central Intelligence Service (NCIS) is an agency of the Namibian government. It is responsible for all intelligence services of Namibia and was established in June 1998 through Proclamation 12/1998 which enforced the Namibia Central Intelligence Service Act 10 of 1997.

The NCIS is headed by a director general. Directors general of the NCIS have been:

- Peter Tsheehama (1998–2005)
- Lt. Gen (rtd) Lucas Hangula (2005–2015)
- Philemon Malima (2015–2020)
- Benedictus Likando (2020–2025)
- Rear Admiral (rtd) Sinsy Nghipandua (2025-)
