= Odibo =

- Settlement
- Location in Namibia
- Coordinates: 17°24′S 15°57′E
- Country: Namibia
- Region: Ohangwena Region
- Constituency: Oshikango Constituency

Government
  - Headman: Charles Namoloh
- Time zone: UTC+2 (South African Standard Time)

Odibo is a village in the north of Namibia close to the Angolan border known for its Anglican mission St Mary. It belongs to the Oshikango electoral constituency in the Ohangwena Region. Odibo is also an Archdeaconry in the Diocese of Namibia.

Odibo is situated on top of a large underground water reservoir. Cracks in the soil and in stone structures are attributed to this. The village Headman is Charles Namoloh, Namibia's Minister of Regional and Local Government, Housing and Rural Development.

== History ==
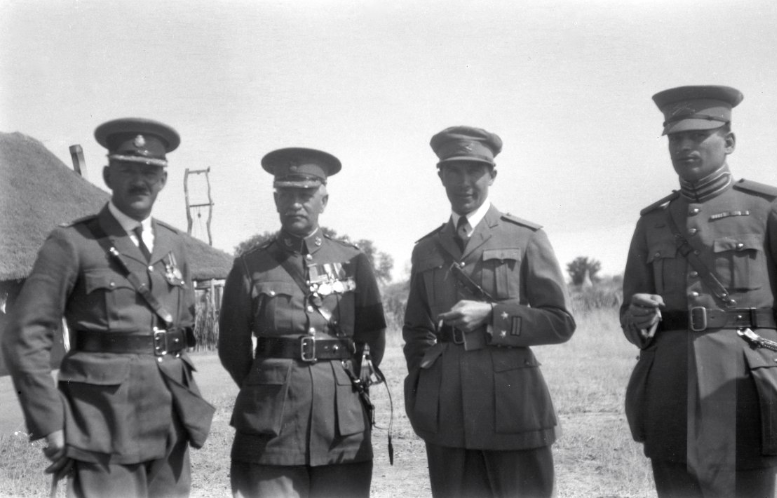
Portuguese and South African soldiers in Odibo (1929)

St Mary's Mission in Odibo was established in August 1924 by George Tobias, Nelson Fogarty, and Reverend R White, Anglican priest that had the task of setting up a mission in northern Ovamboland. The tree where they camped before starting their work is today known as Tobias' Tree. The mission eventually comprised a church, a hospital, and the St Mary Mission School, a high school and seminary.

St Mary Mission School operated until 1979 when it was closed by the South African colonial administration. Several notable people attended this school, including human rights activist and Bishop James Kauluma, National Council member Michael Hishikushitja, People's Liberation Army of Namibia (PLAN) commander Peter Mweshihange, National Assembly member and Bishop of Ovamboland Peter Kalangula and Minister of Foreign Affairs Netumbo Nandi-Ndaitwah.

During the Namibian War of Independence the seminary was bombed in 1981 by the South African Defence Force.

== Education ==
There are two schools at the village, St. Mary's Odibo High School, the successor of Saint Mary Mission School, and Odibo Combined School. There is also a Lutheran Centre for Arts and Crafts for artistic subjects, established by one of Namibia's most famous artists, John Muafangejo, in the early 1970s.

== People ==
Sons and daughters of the village include:

- Hidipo Hamutenya, former opposition leader
- Charles Namoloh, Minister of Safety and Security
