= China–Namibia relations =

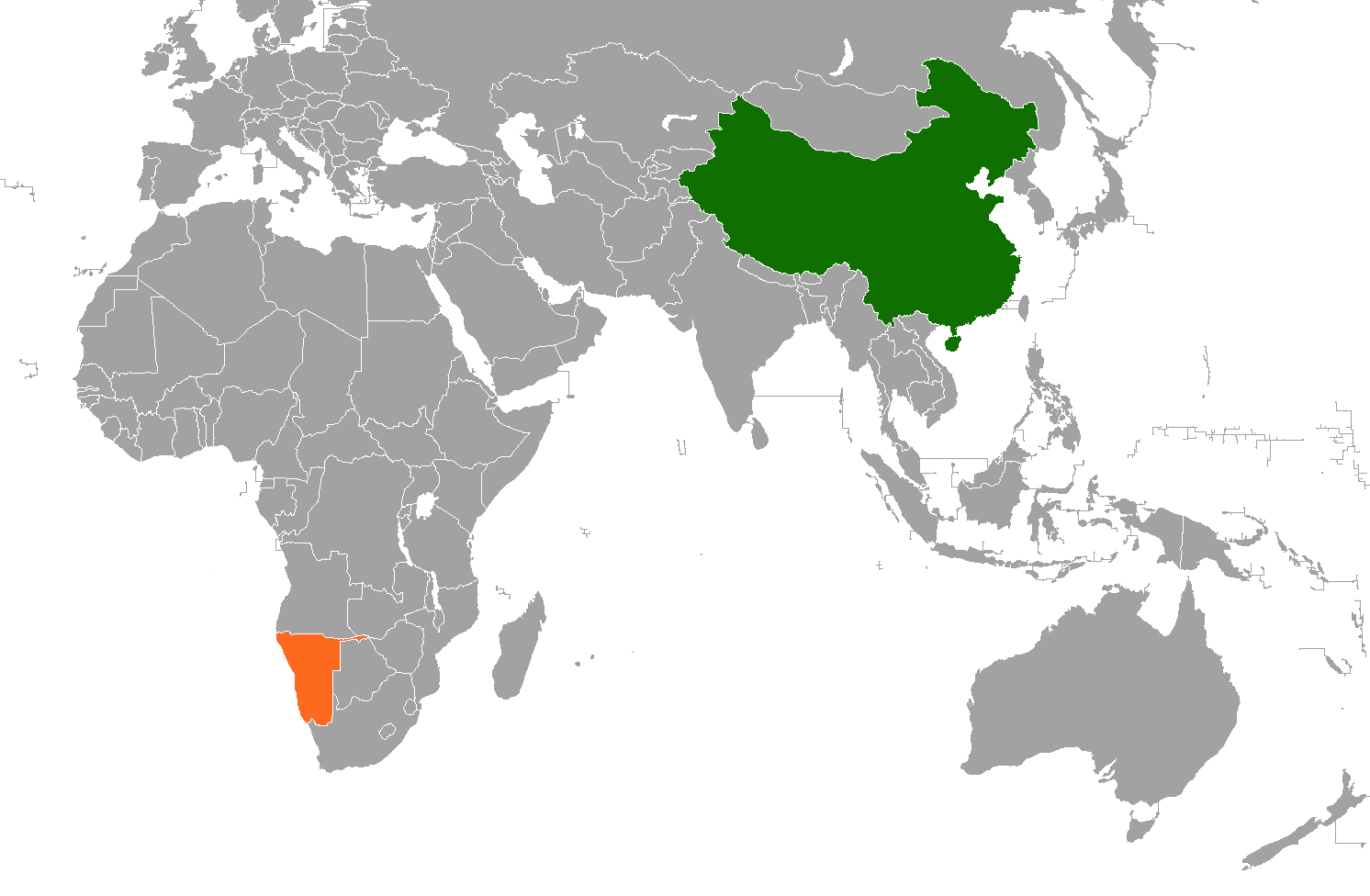
- China: Namibia

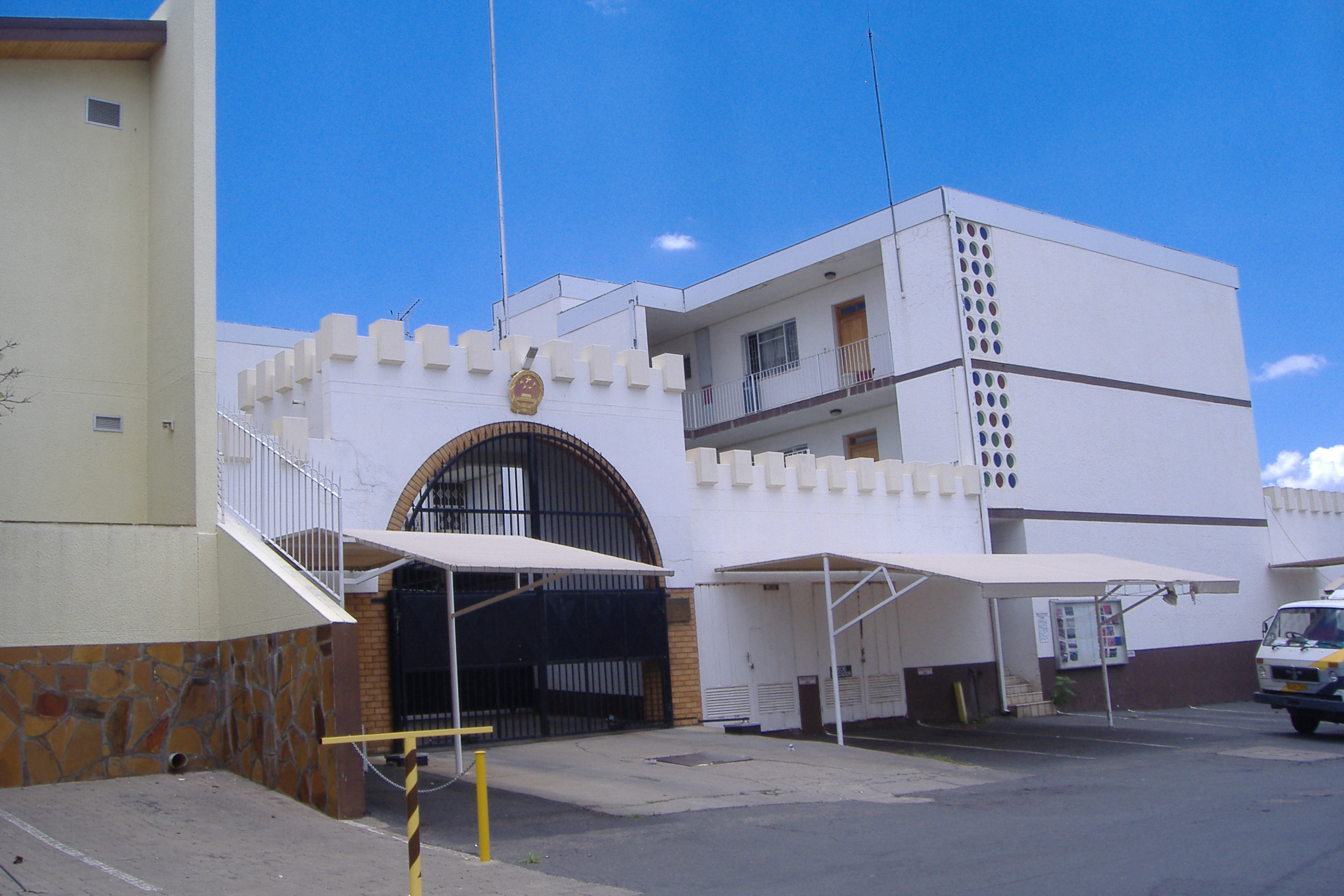
Former Chinese embassy in Windhoek, Namibia.

Diplomatic relations between the People's Republic of China (PRC) and the Republic of Namibia were first established the day after Namibia's independence, but relations with Namibian independence movements date back to the 1960s.

== History ==
=== Before Namibian independence ===
In the 1960s, the PRC established relations with SWAPO and SWANU. According to academic Ian Taylor, "China had to carefully balance calls for support for Namibian independence and the national struggle (fought by SWAPO), with condemnations of Soviet hegemonic machinations in the region."

=== Since Namibian independence ===
Namibia and the PRC established relations on 22 March 1990, a day after Namibia's independence. From 1989 to 1990, China sent 20 personnel to Namibia to help monitor its elections; this was China's first involvement in United Nations peacekeeping efforts in Africa.

In 2018, China and Namibia formed a comprehensive strategic partnership. Namibia also joined the Belt and Road Initiative (BRI) that year.

Namibia was among the African countries which expressed support for the Chinese government during the 2019-2020 Hong Kong protests. In January 2020, Namibia's land reform minister stated that Namibia fully supports Chinese territorial integrity and sovereignty, including with respect to Hong Kong.

China has an extradition treaty with Namibia.

==== Economic relations ====
China began purchasing coal from Namibia in 2010.

Namibia is a major destination for Chinese investment in uranium mining. Chinese companies have invested in Namibia's three biggest uranium producers: Husab, Langer Heinrich, and Rössing.

From 2000 to 2011, there were approximately 64 Chinese official development finance projects identified in Namibia through various media reports.

==== Migration ====
A large number of Chinese are estimated to have taken up residence in Namibia since independence. In 2006, their number was estimated at 40,000. According to a leaked U.S. diplomatic cable, Namibia permits Chinese immigration as loan repayment.

==== An Yue Jiang scandal ====
In April 2008, a weapons shipment on the An Yue Jiang sailed from China and originally planned to dock at the South African port of Durban and unload its cargo for shipment to landlocked Zimbabwe. However, there were widespread protests by persons concerned that the arms would be used by Robert Mugabe's regime in suppressing political opposition in the wake of disputed Zimbabwean presidential election which had taken place a month earlier. Seeking a destination for the ship, it was rumored that it would port on Namibia's coast at Walvis Bay. On 24 April 2008, a protest took place in Namibia's capital of Windhoek, where two hundred protesters marched from a Zoo Park in central Windhoek to the Chinese embassy. Among those leading the protesters were bishop and SWAPO politician Zephania Kameeta and the Legal Assistance Centre. The ship did not port in Namibia.

==== Nuctech bribery scandal ====
On July 21, 2009, a Nuctech representative and two Namibians were arrested after the Anti-Corruption Commission of Namibia (ACC) discovered that a US$12.8 million down payment on 13 scanners had been diverted to a firm called Teko Trading. Namibian prosecutors charged the three with joining in a bribery scheme that secured a $55.3 million contract in May 2008 to install Nuctech scanners at customs inspection points across Namibia. Other sources report the contract to be worth $69 million. General Martin Shalli was subsequently suspended by Namibian president Hifikepunye Pohamba for allegedly receiving millions of Namibian dollars from Nuctech. In 2019, those arrested and charged were acquitted in court.

== Space cooperation ==
Namibia and China also jointly operate the China Telemetry, Tracking, and Command Station which was established in 2001 in Swakopmund, Namibia. This station tracks Chinese satellites and space missions.

== Sovereignty issues ==
Namibia follows the one China principle. It recognizes the People's Republic of China as the sole government of China and Taiwan as an integral part of China's territory, and supports all efforts by the PRC to "achieve national reunification". It also considers Hong Kong, Xinjiang and Tibet to be China's internal affairs.

== Diplomatic staff ==
- Elia Kaiyamo, Namibia's ambassador to China (2016–2025)
- Tonata Gebhard, Namibia's ambassador to China (2025–)

== See also ==
- Sino-African relations
- Chinese people in Namibia

== Bibliography ==
- Cardenal, Juan Pablo; Araújo, Heriberto (2011). La silenciosa conquista china (in Spanish). Barcelona: Crítica. pp. 282–283. ISBN 9788498922578.
