= Arthur Howe-Browne =

Anglican bishop (1881–1961)

Howe-Browne in c1935.

Arthur Henry Howe Browne (16 October 1881 – 8 September 1961) was Bishop of Bloemfontein from 1935 to 1951. He was educated at Winchester and Balliol, and ordained in 1906 after a period of study at Cuddesdon. He began his career with curacies in Witney and East Dulwich. From 1909 to 1916 he was Vicar of St John the Baptist, Kensington. From 1921-1934 he was vicar of St John the Divine, Kennington and also Chaplain to St Gabriel's College in Camberwell. During this time he was Rural Dean of Kennington and a Canon of Southwark until his appointment to the Episcopate. After retirement he lived in Rondebosch until his death.

He was consecrated a bishop on 28 January 1935, by Francis Phelps, Archbishop of Cape Town, at St. George's Cathedral, Cape Town.

Anglican Church of Southern Africa titles
Preceded by Walter Julius Carey	Bishop of Bloemfontein; 1934–1951	Succeeded by Cecil William Alderson
