= Cornelius Tuhafeni Ndjoba =

Namibian Chief of Ovamboland (1930-1982)

Cornelius Tuhafeni Ndjoba (1930–1982) was the chief of the Ovamboland bantustan in Namibia, then known as South West Africa from August 1975 to July 1980 and president of the Democratic Turnhalle Alliance (DTA) from 1978, the year of the assassination of Clemens Kapuuo, to 1980.

Njoba was an outspoken critic of South West Africa People's Organization (SWAPO). He was killed in his vehicle in a landmine explosion in which six other people were also killed. South West African security forces said the mine was laid by SWAPO guerrillas.
