= Julius Shaambeni Shilongo Mnyika =

Namibian guerrilla

Julius Shaambeni Shilongo Mnyika (17 January 1938 – 29 July 2003) was a Namibian guerrilla with the South West African Liberation Army (SWALA), forerunner to the People's Liberation Army of Namibia (PLAN).

== Life ==
Mnyika was born in Epinga, Ohangwena Region, Owamboland. He was one of the first Namibians who went into exile in the late 1950s and 1960s because of oppression by the South African authorities. After working in the gold mines of South Africa, he fled to neighboring Bechuanaland (now Botswana) and set off for Tanganyika (now Tanzania). Mnyika and fellow SWAPO activist Maxton Joseph Mutongolume were arrested in Southern Rhodesia (Zimbabwe) and deported to South Africa, where they were charged with leaving the country illegally. After spending several months in an Old Location prison outside of Windhoek, Mnyika fled again and successfully reached Tanganyika.

He received military training in Tanganyika and later in Algeria. He was one of the founding members of the South West African Liberation Army (SWALA), which eventually transformed into SWAPO's armed wing of PLAN. In 1966, Mnyika was captured during the Battle at Omugulugwombashe, the first military conflict of the Namibian War of Independence against South Africa. In February 1968, he was convicted on terrorism-related charges by the occupying apartheid officials from South Africa and sentenced to life imprisonment. He was sent to Robben Island and spent 17 years in prison. He was released from prison in 1985 and returned to Namibia, only to go back into exile in 1988. He returned the following year, ahead of the 1989 election and the independence of Namibia.
