= Joseph Obgeb Jimmy =

Namibian diplomat (1951–2004)

Namibian High Commissioner to Zimbabwe
- In office 1993–1996
- President: Sam Nujoma

Personal details
- Born: 1951 Lüderitz
- Died: 2 February 2004 (aged 53) Windhoek
- Children: 7
- Education: University of Dar es Salaam
- Profession: Diplomat

Joseph Obgeb Jimmy (1951 – 2 February 2004) was a Namibian diplomat. Jimmy was born in Windhoek's Old Location in 1951 and witnessed the forced removal of residents in December 1959 to the new suburb of Katutura.

Jimmy attended St. Peters Primary School in Lüderitz and completed his primary education at the Damara-Nama High School in Windhoek. He graduated from the Augustineum High School in Windhoek. He then went into exile to join the Namibian War of Independence. He received military training at Oshatotwa in western Zambia, worked for SWAPO's radio program Voice of Namibia in Lusaka, and studied International Law at the University of Dar Es Salaam in Tanzania.

After Namibian independence he was the first High Commissioner of Namibia to Zimbabwe from 1993 to 1996, whereafter he occupied a prominent position in the Namibian Ministry of Foreign Affairs until his death on 2 February 2004.
