= Peter Kalangula =

Namibian politician and religious leader

Peter Tanyangenge Kalangula (12 March 1926 – 20 February 2008) was a Namibian political and religious leader.

== Biography ==
Peter Kalangula was born at Omafo in Ohangwena Region, Ovamboland on 12 March 1926 and after studying at St Mary's School, Odibo trained as a teacher through correspondence. In 1966 he began theological studies to train to be an Anglican priest. He studied at first at the Federal Theological Seminary in Alice, South Africa, and then at St Bede's Theological College, Mthatha.

He was ordained as a deacon in the Church of the Province of Southern Africa but was not ordained as a priest because of a strong disagreement with Bishop Colin Winter in November 1969. As an Ovambo nationalist, Kalangula wanted a separate Anglican diocese in Ovamboland, separate from the Diocese of Damaraland. He then broke away and formed the Ovamboland Anglican Church as an African independent church, with the support of South African government officials and the Security Police. The Ovamboland Anglican Church was later associated with the Church of England in South Africa, and Kalangula was ordained a priest in the CESA in 1979.

In 1973 he was nominated to the Ovambo Legislative Council. He was a member of the Ovambo delegation to the Turnhalle Constitutional Conference 1975–1977, joined the Democratic Turnhalle Alliance (DTA) as a member of the Namibia Democratic Party (NDP), and was a member of the DTA head committee until 1980. He participated in the 1978 elections, becoming a DTA member of the first National Assembly 1979–1983. He tried to persuade the DTA to form a single party, and when it failed to do so he left to form the Christian Democratic Action for Social Justice (CDA).

In the 1980s he was allegedly the victim of an attempted poisoning by South Africa's notorious Civil Cooperation Bureau.

Kalangula died on 20 February 2008 of kidney failure.

== Sources ==
- Pütz, Joachim; von Egidy, Heidi; Caplan, Perri (1990). Namibia handbook and political who's who. Windhoek: Magus. ISBN 0-620-14172-7.
