= James Kauluma =

Namibian bishop and human rights activist

James Hamupanda Kauluma (1 July 1933 – 4 April 2007) was a Namibian human rights activist and sixth bishop of the Anglican Diocese of Namibia. He was the first Namibian bishop of the Anglican diocese in the country.

== Biography ==
Kauluma was born in Ovamboland. In 1949, he began studying at St. Mary's School in Odibo. He was baptised in 1951 at the age of 18. In 1953, he was recruited by the South West African Native Labour Association (SWANLA) and was sent to work in the diamond mines in Oranjemund in the far south of the country.

He studied at the Dorothea Mission in Johannesburg between 1958 and 1959, and in Kenya, before returning to Namibia in 1964. In 1965 he travelled to Canada and the United States for further study, graduating with a BA degree from the University of Toronto and an MA from New York University. He was ordained: made a deacon on 22 June 1975 at the Church of the Ascension, Harrowby, Lincolnshire and, in 1977, was ordained as priest — both times by Colin Winter, Bishop of Damaraland-in-exile.

He was elected Suffragan Bishop of Damaraland in 1977 and was consecrated a bishop at Westminster Abbey, London, on 15 January 1978 by Edward Knapp-Fisher (Canon and Archdeacon of Westminster, Assistant Bishop of London), acting under commission from the Archbishop of Cape Town, assisted by the Bishop of Damaraland-in-exile, the Assistant Bishop of Damaraland, and others. Since the diocesan (Winter) and assistant (Wood) were both foreigners, they could be prevented from re-entering Namibia; whereas, as a citizen, Kauluma could not.

He returned to live in Namibia in 1978, after having lived abroad for 12 years. After the death of Colin Winter in 1981, Kauluma was elected diocesan bishop, the first Namibian to hold that office.

In 1983, Kauluma received an honorary doctorate of divinity from the General Theological Seminary in New York. In 1986 Kauluma, along with the Lutheran bishop Kleopas Dumeni and the Roman Catholic bishop Bonifatius Haushiku, challenged a dusk-to-dawn curfew that South African authorities had imposed in Namibia. The bishops argued that the curfew violated the freedom to assemble, freedom of religion, freedom of association, and freedom of movement.

Kauluma retired from public life in 1998 and died from prostate cancer on 4 April 2007 at the Windhoek Medi-Clinic.

Denis Herbstein, writing for The Guardian, suggests that "he was not a good speaker but he was outspoken, writing to the Times in London about South Africa's occupation of the country".

== Bibliography ==
- Pütz, Joachim, Heidi von Egidy & Perri Caplani. 1990. Namibia handbook and political who's who, 2nd edn. Windhoek: Magus. ISBN 0-620-14172-7
- Church of the Province of Southern Africa Clerical Directory, 1991/1992, p. 222.
- Bishopscourt Archives, Consecration of Bishops, 1847–1986.

Preceded by Colin O'Brien Winter	Anglican Bishop of Namibia; 1981–1998	Succeeded by Nehemiah Shihala Hamupembe
