= Onekwaya West =

- Settlement
- Location within Namibia
- Coordinates: 17°36′S 15°51′E
- Country: Namibia
- Region: Ohangwena
- Constituency: Endola
- Time zone: UTC+2 (SAST)

Onekwaya West also known as "O-West/One-West" is a settlement in the Ohangwena Region of northern Namibia, situated 42 kilometres (26 mi) north of Oshakati and 30 kilometres (19 mi) from Oshikango. It belongs to the Endola electoral constituency.

Onekwaya West is one of the biggest villages in the Endola constituency, and it is divided into two sections, section A and section B. Neighboring settlements are Ohalushu 3 km (1.9 mi) south, Oshali 6 km (3.7 mi) north east, Onamutai 9 km (5.6 mi) south, Efululula 5 km (3.1 mi) north, Onanghulo 5 km (3.1 mi) north and Omhedi 4 km (2.5 mi) south. In Omhedi is the homestead of the King of Oukwanyama traditional authority.

The village was famous during colonial rule in Namibia because is where some of Namibia's political leaders attended primary school, for instance Tuliameni Kalomoh in 1962-1966 who then went on to St. Mary's Odibo High School for secondary education.

Onekwaya West is home to a mission station of the Anglican Church of Southern Africa. The settlement is well-developed, is electrified, and features a clinic, a church and a school. This is where most of small village that close to Onekwaya like Ongonga, Olyamunyandi and Okafitu come for services help like health services, church services and also charging their phones because those small villages don't have electricity. The most spoken language in the village is Oshiwambo but English is widely understood too. predominantly they grow crops as well as tend to cattle.
