= Ongha Senior Secondary School =

Secondary school in Ohangwena, Namibia

Ongha Secondary School is a secondary school in the Ohangwena Region of Namibia. It was established in Ongha in 1978.
