= Endola Constituency =

Electoral constituency in the Ohangwena region of northern Namibia

Coordinates: 17°36′S 15°43′E

Endola constituency (red) in the Ohangwena Region of Namibia

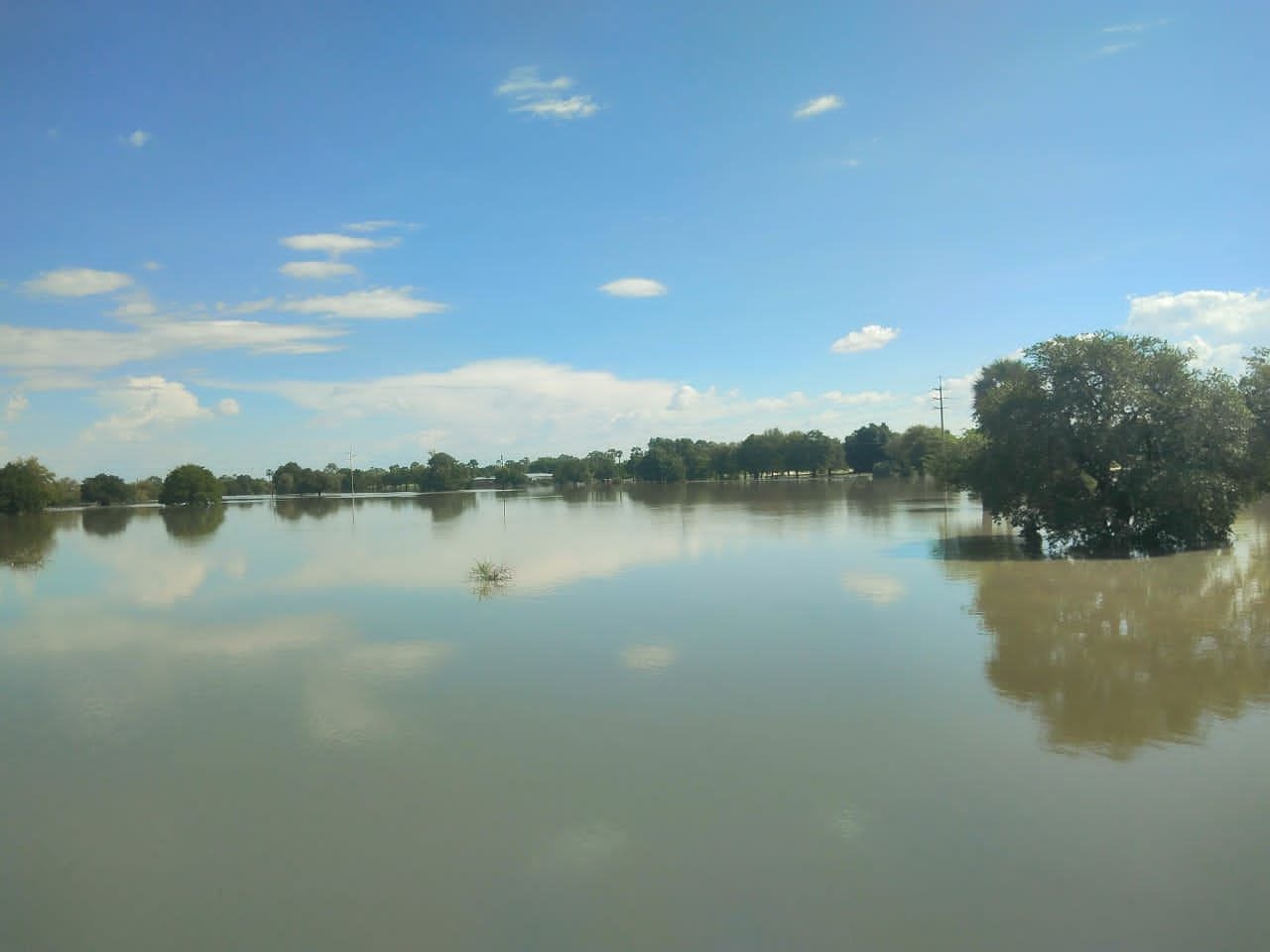
Flood water in the constituency of Endola during May 2023

Endola is an electoral constituency in the Ohangwena Region of Namibia, on the border of Angola. It had 14,100 registered voters in 2020. The constituency covers an area of 328 km^{2} (127 sq mi) and contains numerous settlements, including part of Ongha. The constituency office is situated at Oshawapala. The constituency had a population of 25,591 in 2011, up from 24,804 in 2001.

When in 2003 Omulonga Constituency was created at the recommendation of the Third Delimitation Commission of Namibia, and in preparation of the 2004 general election, Endola lost part of its territory and its inhabitants to the new constituency.

The constituency is hard-hit by the drought just like the rest of the northern region, but the situation was made worse by lack of drinking water for people and their animals as many water points were disconnected because of unpaid bills. The constituency is also faced with the issue of people who have no national documents. Endola is a flood-prone area with many water pans therefore, good roads are needed to avoid a situation where villages are totally cut off during the rainy season. The constituency is badly affected by crime, a situation blamed on it having one police station at Ongha. There is one clinic which helps inhabitants with medications.

== Politics ==
As is common in all constituencies of former Owamboland, Namibia's ruling SWAPO Party has dominated elections since independence. Ruth Nhinda (SWAPO) was regional councillor for the Endola constituency from 2004 when she received 7,510 of the 7,557 votes cast.

Her death in 2014 necessitated a by-election which was won by Ferdinand Shifidi, also SWAPO. Shifidi was reelected in the 2015 regional election, gathering 5,703 votes, while the only opposition candidate, Hafeni Pius of the Rally for Democracy and Progress (RDP), received 398 votes. Shifidi was again reelected in the 2020 regional election; he received 4,892 votes. Runner-up became Tulipohamba Nghiueuelekwa the Independent Patriots for Change (IPC), an opposition party formed in August 2020, who obtained 1,121 votes.
