= Bob Mize =

Robert "Bob" Herbert Mize Jr. (4 February 1907 – 17 August 2000) was Bishop of Damaraland, Southern Africa from 1960 to his expulsion in 1968. He was born on 4 February 1907 into an ecclesiastical family in Emporia, Kansas. His father Robert Herbert Mize Sr. was Missionary Bishop of Salina from 1921 to 1938. He was educated at the University of Kansas. After his ordination in 1932, he worked with disadvantaged boys at a mission in western Kansas.

In 1945, he founded the St. Francis Boys Home at Ellsworth in the centre of the state, a position he held until his elevation to the episcopate. A supporter of the Confraternity of the Blessed Sacrament in the United States, he died on 17 August 2000 and is buried in Ellis County, Kansas.

Religious titles
Preceded by John Vincent	Bishop of Damaraland; 1960–1968	Succeeded by Colin Winter
