= Walter Carey =

British Anglican bishop and rugby union player (1875–1955)

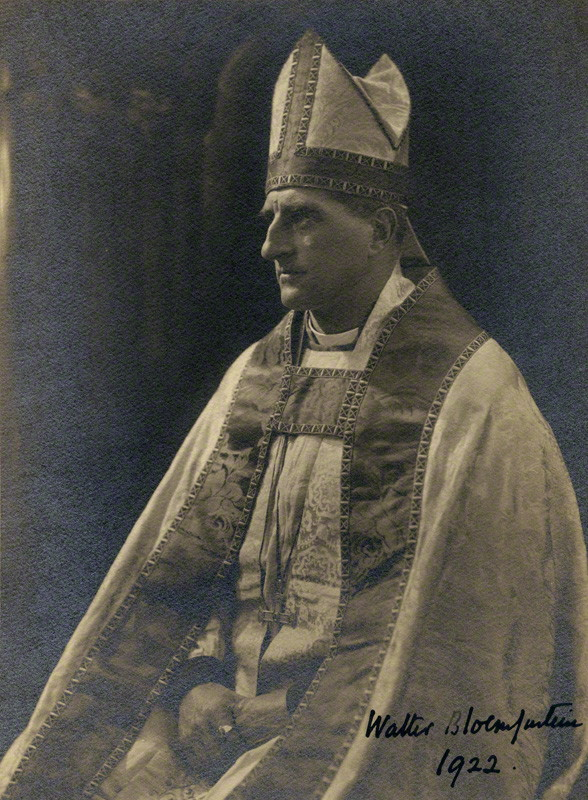
- Carey in 1922
- Born: Walter Julius Carey; 12 July 1875 Billesdon, Leicestershire, England
- Died: 17 February 1955 (aged 79) Eastbourne, England
- School: Bedford School
- University: Hertford College, Oxford

Rugby union career
- Position: Forward
Senior career
Years	Team	Apps	(Points)
- Oxford University RFC
–	Blackheath F.C.		
–	Barbarian F.C.		
International career
Years	Team	Apps	(Points)
1896	British Isles XV	4	(3)

The Right Reverend Walter Julius Carey (12 July 1875 – 17 February 1955) was an English Anglican clergyman and author who served as Bishop of Bloemfontein in South Africa from 1921 to 1935. Carey was a rugby union forward who played club rugby for Oxford University and Blackheath and played international rugby for the British Isles XV in their 1896 tour of South Africa.

== Personal history ==
Carey was born in Billesdon, Leicestershire, in 1875 to Alfred Henry Carey, who was an Oxford-educated priest, and was educated at Bedford School before gaining entry to Hertford College, Oxford, in 1894 He received his BA in 1896 and by 1899 he was the curate at the Church of the Ascension in Lavender Hill, London, a post he held until 1908. In 1908 Casey became the librarian for Pusey House, a college of Oxford; and remained there until 1914.

During the First World War, Carey served as a chaplain to the Royal Navy and was present at the Battle of Jutland, on board the battleship HMS Warspite. Carey married during wartime, to Fanny Emma Parfitt in 1917. They had one child, Wilfred Herbert.

After the end of the war, he was granted the post of warden of the Bishop's Hostel, Lincoln Theological College, remaining at the college only until 1921. He then emigrated to South Africa, becoming the Bishop of Bloemfontein, remaining there until 1934, returning to Britain due to ill-health. Back in England, Carey accepted the post of chief messenger of Society for the Propagation of the Gospel, but resigned from the role the next year. In 1936 he was appointed chaplain of Eastbourne College, holding the office until 1940 and again after the war from 1945 to 1948.

== Rugby career ==
Carey was a keen sportsman, and while at Oxford as a student, he was captain of the College Boat and won four sporting 'Blues' in The Varsity Match between 1894 and 1897. In 1894 Carey was selected to represent invitational touring rugby team, the Barbarians, and became forever linked to the team when he instituted the club motto:

Rugby Football is a game for gentlemen in all classes, but for no bad sportsman in any class.

Although Carey never played international rugby for England, he was selected in 1896 to represent the British Isles in their tour of South Africa, after being nominated by his university along with Cuth Mullins. Carey played in all four Tests against the South Africans, and scored a try in the opening Test at Port Elizabeth.

== Writing career ==
Carey wrote several theological works, often in relation to his experiences abroad. Although many of his writings were entries within large collected journals, he penned two main works, Good-bye to my Generation, an autobiography, published London & Oxford: A. R. Mowbray, 1951, and Crisis in Kenya: Christian common sense on Mau Mau and the colour bar, published in 1953.

== Notes ==
Anglican Church of Southern Africa titles
Preceded by Arthur Chandler	Bishop of Bloemfontein; 1921–1935	Succeeded by Arthur Henry Howe-Browne
