= Oshigambo High School =

Secondary school in Oshigambo, northern Namibia

Coordinates: 17°47′13″S 16°04′27″E

Oshigambo High School, also Oshigambo Senior Secondary School, is a school in Oshigambo in the Oshikoto Region of northern Namibia. It is situated approximately 30 km east of Ondangwa.

== About ==
In 2006, Oshigambo River broke its banks for the first time in 50 years. The flood water separated the school from its hostel; students and teachers who stayed at the other side of the river had to either pass through the river at their own risk, or had to walk a distance of about 3 km to get to school. A bridge had been promised to be built by President Hifikepunye Pohamba.

== Academic excellence ==
Oshigambo High School

(also known as Oshigambo Senior Secondary School) is a co-educational church-affiliated secondary school located in Oshigambo, Oshikoto Region, northern Namibia. Founded in 1960 under the Evangelical Lutheran Church in Namibia (ELCIN), it is regarded as one of the leading schools in the north of the country. The school has a long tradition of academic excellence and continues to integrate modern technology into its teaching environment.

History

The school was established in 1960 by Finnish missionaries, with Toivo Tirronen serving as its first principal. Since its founding, Oshigambo High School has grown into a major educational institution in northern Namibia, producing graduates who have excelled nationally. Over the decades, the school has expanded its facilities and curriculum, while maintaining its strong church affiliation.

Facilities

Oshigambo High School is notable for its modern infrastructure. Security cameras are installed throughout the campus, which has helped to limit theft. Every classroom is equipped with smartboards, and most have air conditioning, with ongoing efforts to extend this to all rooms. Teachers are provided with tablets, which has increased the variety of teaching methods and improved academic outcomes. The campus features lawns, fountains, and multiple benches, creating a welcoming environment for students. The school also maintains separate boys’ and girls’ hostels to accommodate learners from outside the area.

Academics

The school offers classes from Grade 7 to Grade 12, preparing students for national examinations. Oshigambo High School has consistently ranked among the best schools in northern Namibia. In 2025, student Panduleni Nghitanwa achieved first place nationally in the Grade 12 results, and in 2025 the school placed second nationally surpassed only by Canisianum School. This achievement reinforced the school’s reputation for academic excellence.

Extracurricular Activities

Students at Oshigambo High School participate in a wide range of extracurricular activities. The school hosts a debate club, choir, and cultural groups that promote Namibian traditions. These activities complement the academic program and contribute to the holistic development of learners.

Religious Life

As a church school, Oshigambo High School emphasizes spiritual growth alongside academics. Students attend church services every Sunday, and the school is situated near the landmark Omukwiyu gwemanya fig tree, which holds cultural and spiritual significance in the community.

Administration

The current principal of Oshigambo High School is Mr. Pinhas Ekongo, who oversees the school’s academic and administrative operations. Under his leadership, the school continues to modernize while preserving its religious and cultural heritage.

Reputation

Oshigambo High School is widely recognized as one of the best schools in northern Namibia. Its combination of modern technology, strong academics, cultural activities, and Christian values has made it a model institution in the region.

Edited by: Petrus Action Kristof 10C

== Notable alumni ==
- Eddie Amkongo
- Nahas Angula
- Pendukeni Ivula Ithana
- Philemon Malima (graduated 1971)
- Nangolo Mbumba
- Peter Nambundunga
- Sacky Shanghala
