= Luke Pato =

Anglican bishop

Luke Lungile Pato was a South African Anglican bishop. He was bishop of Namibia from 2016 until 2021.

Pato served as principal of the College of the Transfiguration, as a provincial executive officer, and at parishes in South Africa and England.

He died on 6 September 2026, reportedly surrounded by close friends and family.
