= Eddie Amkongo =

Namibian civil servant and diplomat

Eddie Shimwethelini Amkongo (born 1 December 1945) is a Namibian civil servant and diplomat. A chief diplomat with SWAPO and later independent Namibia, Amkongo was appointed chairperson of the Public Service Commission in 2006.

== Early life and exile ==
Born near Ondangwa, Amkongo studied at Oshigambo High School in Oshigambo, Oshikoto Region in the 1960s and he was found with SWAPO publications and letters from friend Helmut Angula from the Soviet Union. He later became a leading organizer for SWAPO in northern Namibia. From 1971 to 1972, Amkongo studied at Turfloop University, a black-only university in South Africa. In June 1974, Amkongo and several SWAPO organisers fled into exile to SWAPO's camp in Oshatotwa, Zambia, where he received military training. He also studied at Evelyn Hone College in Lusaka while in exile. He then worked for SWAPO's Voice of Namibia radio station in Zambia then Brazzaville, People's Republic of the Congo. He was a key diplomat for SWAPO abroad during the 1980s; he was based in Senegal (1981–85) and France (1985–89) and was the chief diplomat for West Africa and much of Western Europe while based there. In the late 1980s, Amkongo was one of SWAPO's chief negotiators during the run-up to independence.

== Diplomacy and civil service ==
Following Namibia's independence in 1990, Amkongo became a key civil servant and diplomat in the newly established government. He served as his country's ambassador to Ethiopia, home of the Organization of African Unity. He also held several key domestic posts, including in the Office of the President and as cabinet secretary. In 2000, he was sent to the Democratic Republic of the Congo as Namibia's top diplomat during the Second Congo War. From 2000 to 2003, Amkongo was a political advisor to the foreign forces supporting Congo's government during the implementation of the Lusaka Ceasefire Agreement.
