= List of ambassadors of Namibia to China =

Coordinates: 39.945526°N 116.451262°E

Ambassador of Namibia to the People's Republic of China
- Incumbent; Tonata Gebhard since September 18, 2025
- Inaugural holder: Peter Mweshihange
- Formation: 1996

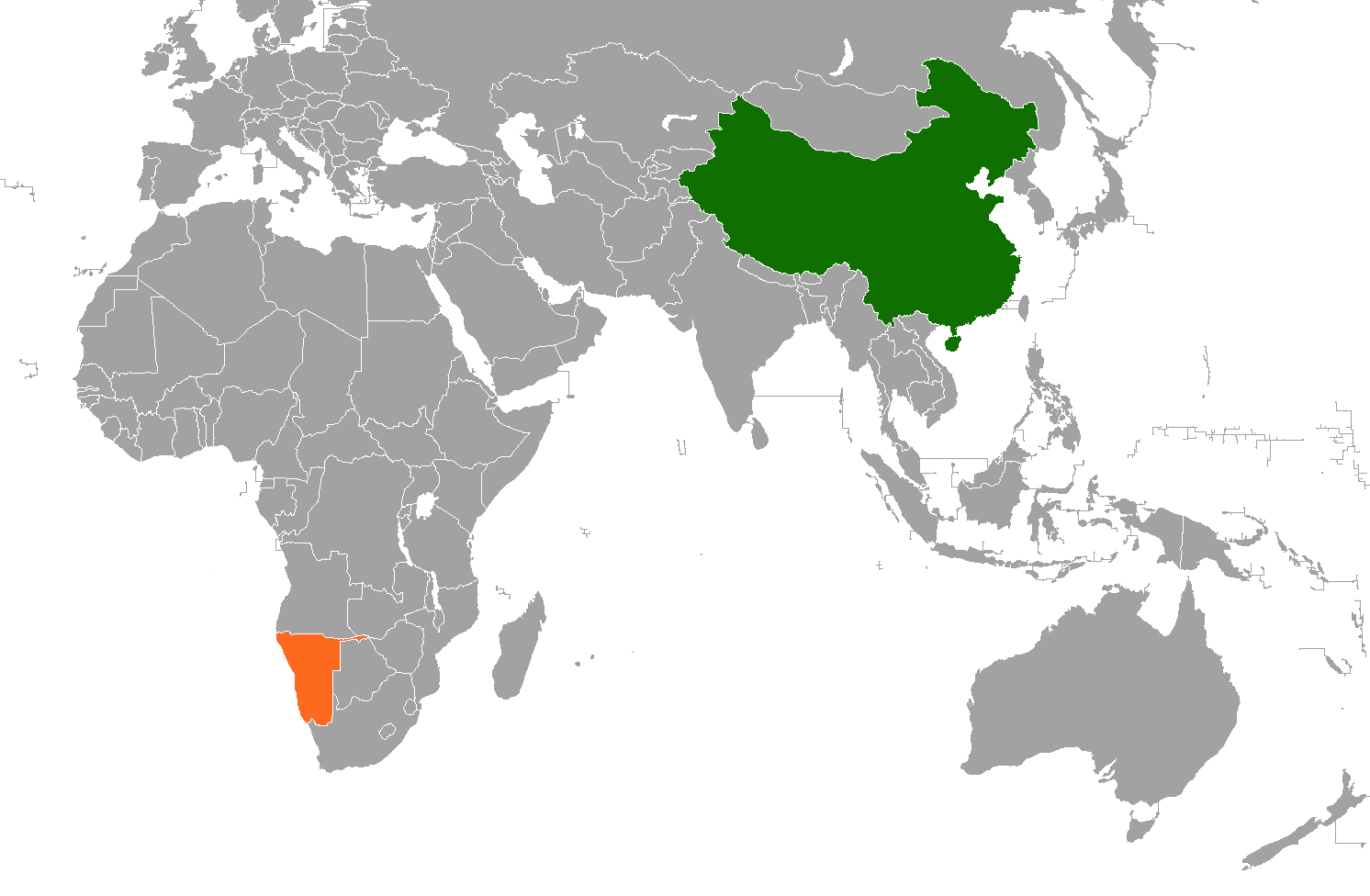
China Namibia Locator

The Namibian ambassador in Beijing is the official representative of the Government in Windhoek to the Government of the People's Republic of China.

== List of representatives ==
Diplomatic agrément/Diplomatic accreditation	Ambassador	Observations	Prime Minister of Namibia	Premier of the People's Republic of China	Term end
1996	Peter Mweshihange		Hage Geingob	Li Peng	March 20, 1998
April 16, 1999	Hopelong Uushona Ipinge		Hage Geingob	Zhu Rongji	January 29, 2005
August 16, 2005	Leonard Nambahu	(*1955)	Nahas Angula	Wen Jiabao	
November 7, 2013	Ringo Festus Abed		Hage Geingob	Li Keqiang	June 23, 2016
September 2, 2016	Elia Kaiyamo		Saara Kuugongelwa	Li Keqiang	August 22, 2025
	Tonata Gebhard		Elijah Ngurare	Li Keqiang	
