= Epuku =

- Settlement
- Location within Namibia
- Coordinates: 17°33′S 15°45′E
- Country: Namibia
- Region: Ohangwena Region
- Time zone: UTC+2 (SAST)

Epuku is a village in Ohangwena Region, Namibia. Located 30 km north of Ondangwa, the village was the site of a grave for seven People's Liberation Army of Namibia (PLAN) combatants who died in battle with the occupying South African Defence Force. It was also the birthplace of politician Ponhele ya France.
