= Pat Fogarty (illustrator) =

South African-born illustrator (1940–1999)

- Born: Patricia Marion Fogarty; 15 November 1940; Cradock, Cape Province, South Africa
- Died: 17 February 1999 (aged 58); London, England
- Other name: Piffy Fogarty
- Education: Port Elizabeth Technical College
- Occupation: Illustrator
- Relatives: Nelson Wellesley Fogarty (grandfather)

Pat "Piffy" Fogarty (15 November 1940 – 17 February 1999) was a South African-born illustrator, who in 1965 migrated to Europe, ultimately settling in London, England, where she became "one of the best respected freelance book illustrators".

== Biography ==
Patricia Marion Fogarty – known from childhood by the nickname "Piffy" – was born on 15 November 1940 in Cradock, Cape Province, South Africa, into a farming family; together with her older brother Denis and her twin Leigh, she was brought up in Grootfontein, Namibia, where their grandfather Nelson Wellesley Fogarty had been Anglican Bishop of Damaraland. She was educated at boarding-school in Port Elizabeth, and subsequently studied art, from 1959 to 1962, at Port Elizabeth Technical College.

Moving to Europe in 1965, she left behind the alternative of life under apartheid; in England, she taught art, then in the early 1970s spent time painting on the Greek island of Skiathos, as well as two years in Paris, France, painting film posters.

Basing herself in north London from 1981, she freelanced as an illustrator, working for many notable clients, including Penguin Books, The Daily Telegraph, Reader's Digest, as well as Tesco's. She was much respected as a book illustrator, with cover portraits of John Mortimer commissioned by Penguin cited as classics. As her obituary in The Guardian noted, "Fogarty was a fine photographer and excelled in painting interiors. She worked with phenomenal speed and also found time to be a volunteer for the Lesbian and Gay Switchboard. Then it all stopped. When computer-generated images came in, a generation of self-employed illustrators became redundant. Fogarty passed time by betting (successfully) on horses, returned to an early interest in psychology, and started a three-year diploma course in existential psychotherapy and counselling, doing her practical work at an HIV/Aids centre."

== Personal life and death ==
During her early years in Namibia, Fogarty developed a love of Hollywood films, going weekly to film shows in the local hotel, and in later life she was noted for her impressive impersonation of Judy Garland. Fogarty died of cancer in London on 17 February 1999, aged 58. She had a long-time partnership with avant-garde filmmaker Jayne Parker, on whose projects she served as associate producer and in other capacities.
