= St Mark's School (Mbabane) =

St. Mark's School

Location
- Mbabane, Hhohho; Eswatini
- 26.316354°S 31.139706°E

Information
- Type: Public, Boarding
- Motto: Nisi Dominus
- Established: 1908
- Locale: Suburban
- Head-Teacher: Chris Davies; (Grades 1–7): Khanyisile Baah Shabangu; (Grades 8–12 and A-Levels)
- Exam board: UCLES (SPC, J.C., and IGCSE O-Level, A-Level)
- Grades: 1–12 and A-Level (2 years)
- Enrollment: 2,000 boys and girls
- Colors: Crimson and Blue

St Mark's School is a public co-educational school in Mbabane, Eswatini. It was founded in 1908 by the Reverend (later Bishop) Christopher Watts, priest in charge of Mbabane, then in the Anglican Diocese of Zululand.

== History ==
Christopher Watts was a staunch believer in high quality education, so sought to establish a school that would eventually have the prestige of other Anglican boarding schools in Southern Africa, such as Michaelhouse and St John's College, Johannesburg.

In January 1908, with just four children who gathered in the ten-by-ten-foot room of Watts, St Mark's School was born. Enrollment grew rapidly, with support from the government of Swaziland and private benefactors. The school did well in the Cape Matriculation Examination and was soon the most prestigious school in the country. This was to go unchallenged until the formation of Waterford Kamhlaba by Michael Stern in 1963.

== Notable alumni ==
Notable St Mark's students include:

- Patrice Motsepe, businessman and sports executive (African Rainbow Minerals, Harmony Gold), president of the Chambers of Commerce and Industry South Africa (CHAMSA)
- Phuthuma Nhleko, former Chairman and Group Chief Executive Officer of MTN telecommunications group
- Richard E. Grant, Actor and director
- Russell Dlamini, Prime Minister of Eswatini

== Education system ==
The high school is well known for its academic and extracurricular excellence in Eswatini and regionally in SADC. Under the guidance of its principal, the school 's daily operations are consistently managed carefully.

The school is divided into 2 main divisions and further subdivisions based on the level of education:

- Secondary school

These are further divided into the Junior Secondary (Grade 8 and 9) and Senior Secondary (Grade 10,11 and Form 5)

- Form 6 college

These are divided into the Form 6 Uppers (A2) and Form 6 Lowers (AS Level)

The school additionally has a total of 7 streams. Except for Upper and Lower, the streams are named after previous principals and also function as school sports houses. These are Balarin (Ba), Tugman (Tu), Watts (W), Taylor (Ta) and Dominic (Do). Currently there are only 2 classes in Do, however the stream is expected to be completed in early 2026.
