= Elia Kaiyamo =

Namibian politician (born 1951)

The Honourable Elia George Kaiyamo

Ambassador to China
- In office 2 September 2016 – 22 August 2025
- President: Hage Geingob
- Prime Minister: Saara Kuugongelwa

Deputy Minister of Home Affairs and Immigration
- In office 21 March 2010 – 21 March 2015
- President: Hifikepunye Pohamba
- Prime Minister: Nahas Angula; Hage Geingob

Personal details
- Born: 10 January 1951 (age 75) Ondobe, Ohangwena Region
- Party: SWAPO
- Education: University of Cape Town; University of Namibia; Pacific Western University

Elia George Kaiyamo (born 10 January 1951) is a Namibian politician and diplomat. A member of SWAPO, Kaiyamo was an internal organizer and teacher for SWAPO prior to independence. He was Deputy Minister of Home Affairs and Immigration from 2010 to 2015.

Kaiyamo served as the Namibian Ambassador to China from 2016 to 2025.

== Early life and education ==
Born at Ondobe in Ohangwena Region, Kaiyamo earned a B.A. from the University of Cape Town in 1989. He earned another B.A. from the University of Namibia in 1992. In 1994, Kaiyamo earned a M.A. in international relations from Pacific Western University in Los Angeles, California in the United States.

== Career ==
Kaiyamo worked at various schools in Katutura, the blacks-only township of Windhoek from 1976 to 1987. He was also an organizer for SWAPO during this time. In 1988–1989, Kaiyamo studied in Cape Town towards a bachelor's degree. Kaiyamo returned as Namibia became independent and became assistant principal at A. Shipena Secondary School in Windhoek. Lasting in that position until 1991, he left education to work for the Foreign Ministry of Namibia. Kaiyamo worked in Europe at various Namibian embassies, including in Russia, Germany and Austria from 1991 to 1997. From 1997 to 1999, Kaiyamo served as desk officer at the Foreign Ministry. He represented SWAPO in the National Assembly in 2000 and subsequently re-elected in 2005 and 2009. Kaiyamo was appointed Deputy Minister of Home Affairs and Immigration in president Hifikepunye Pohamba's new cabinet on 21 March 2010.

=== Ambassador to China ===
Kaiyamo was appointed as Namibia's Ambassador to the People's Republic of China on 2 September 2016. He served until 22 August 2025.

According to China Daily, Kaiyamo reiterated that Namibia's strategic position and abundant natural resources, including solar and wind potential, offer strong opportunities for Chinese investment in renewable energy projects.

== Publications ==
Kaiyamo has written research papers on public policy and education in Namibia. In 2007, he authored Education and Stakeholders in Namibia, analyzing the roles of various actors in the country's post-independence education system. In 2010, he produced Research Proposals on Namibia, focusing on strengthening institutional research and promoting evidence-based development planning.

== Awards ==
In 2007, Kaiyamo was inducted into Namibia's Room of Fame, an initiative recognizing individuals for contributions to national development.
