= Ongha =

Settlement in northern Namibia

Coordinates: 17°38′29″S 15°55′24″E

Ongha is a settlement in the Ohangwena Region of northern Namibia. Its area falls within two electoral constituencies, Endola and Omulonga.

People started settling in 1940 and its first headman was named Naghonda. His name is borne by Oshivambo Ongha yaNaghonda. Ongha is in a suburban area of the northern part of Namibia. Its local language is Oshikwanyama. It is situated around 725 kilometers to the north of Windhoek.

The village is home to the Ongha Senior Secondary School. In 1993, a clinic was built, and it might be upgraded to a hospital. Ongha is at a crossroads that connects all the surrounding towns like Ondangwa, Eenhana, Ohangwena, Oshikango and Olunho.

People here survive by growing crops like pearl millet (omahangu), beans, collecting fruits like basis (eembe) and living on animal meat like goats and cows. Some prepare traditional food and sell this.

A well-known church is also found in this town, the Ongha Roman Catholic mission, which teaches bible studies to all interested members of the community. It also has a pre-primary school for children and has a feeding scheme.
