= Richard Wood (bishop) =

British bishop and anti-apartheid campaigner (1920-2008)

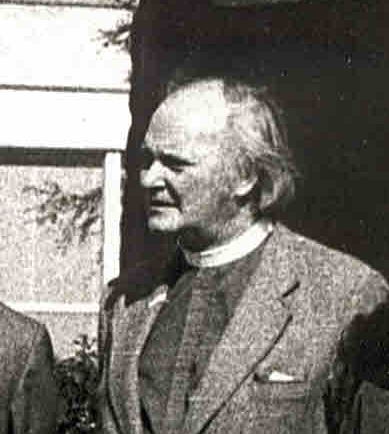
Wilberforce Monument, Hull, 13th September 1978

Richard James Wood (25 August 1920 – 9 October 2008) was a British Anglican bishop and anti-apartheid campaigner. He was ordained in the Church of England and served his curacy in the Diocese of Salisbury. He then moved to South Africa and served in a number of parish posts before becoming the Suffragan Bishop of Damaraland in 1973. He was expelled from South Africa in 1975 for speaking out against the apartheid government. He returned to England permanently in 1977, and became Vicar of St Mary's Church, Hull and chaplain to the University of Hull; during this time, he was also an Assistant Bishop in the Diocese of York. His final post before retirement, from 1979 to 1983, was as a member of staff of St Mark's Theological College, Dar es Salaam.

Anglican Communion titles
New title	Suffragan Bishop of Damaraland; 1973 to 1977	Succeeded by James Kauluma
