= John Vincent (bishop) =

- Bishop of Damaraland
- Installed: 1952
- Term ended: 1960

Orders
- Ordination: 1921

Personal details
- Born: John Dacre Vincent; 1 January 1894
- Died: 19 May 1960 (aged 66)
- Education: St John's College, Oxford

The Rt Rev John Dacre Vincent MA MC and bar (1 January 1894 – 19 May 1960) was the Bishop of Damaraland, Namibia from 1952 to 1960.

He was born on 1 January 1894, educated at Marlborough and St John's College, Oxford, and ordained in 1921 after World War I service with the Devonshire Regiment. He began his ecclesiastical career with a curacy at Gillingham, Dorset and was then a Minor Canon at Bloemfontein Cathedral. After this he was Vicar of Longbridge Deverill in Wiltshire until 1937 when he returned to Bloemfontein as its Archdeacon, a position he held until his elevation to the episcopate.

Vincent died on 19 May 1960, aged 66.

Anglican Communion titles
Preceded by Cecil Alderson	Bishop of Damaraland; 1952–1960	Succeeded by Bob Mize
