= Philemon Malima =

Namibian politician and intelligence officer

Hon. Philemon Malima MP

Director-general of the Namibia Central Intelligence Service
- In office September 2015 – March 2020
- President: Hage Geingob
- Preceded by: Lucas Hangula
- Succeeded by: Benedictus Likando

Minister of Environment and Tourism
- In office 1997–2005
- President: Sam Nujoma
- Preceded by: Gert Hanekom
- Succeeded by: Willem Konjore

Minister of Defence
- In office 1995–1997
- President: Sam Nujoma
- Preceded by: Peter Mweshihange
- Succeeded by: Erkki Nghimtina

Deputy Minister of Defence
- In office 1990–1995
- President: Sam Nujoma
- Preceded by: position established

Personal details
- Born: 9 July 1946 (age 80) South West Africa
- Party: SWAPO
- Education: Russia Institute of Political Science (1981)
- Profession: Politician; Diplomat

Philemon Malima (born 9 July 1946) is a Namibian politician and diplomat who was the chief of intelligence service of Namibia Central Intelligence Service from 2015 to 2020. Malima has been a member of the Cabinet of Namibia since March 1990 and has served as minister responsible for various ministries since independence.

== Early life and education ==
Malima was born in Omandongo in Oshikoto Region. He attended Oshigambo High School east of Ondangwa and graduated in 1971. From 1972 to 1974 he received training as pastor in Otjimbingwe.

Malima obtained political and military training in the USSR in the early 1980s, at the Institute of Political Science, and at Simferopol. He worked as a political educator, military officer and diplomat of SWAPO, as well as its representative to the Soviet Union between 1987 and 1989.

== Career ==
Upon Independence of Namibia in 1990 he became a member of the National Assembly of Namibia and deputy Minister of Defence. In 1995 he was promoted to minister, and in 1997 he was moved to the Ministry of Environment and Tourism. He served until his retirement in 2005.

Malima was appointed director-general of Namibia Central Intelligence Service in May 2015.
