= Christian Democratic Action for Social Justice =

Political party in Namibia

- Founded: 1982
- Dissolved: 1989
- Split from: Democratic Turnhalle Alliance
- Succeeded by: United Democratic Front
- Ideology: Christian democracy, social justice

The Christian Democratic Action for Social Justice (CDA) was a political party in Namibia.

It was founded in 1982 through a split in the Democratic Turnhalle Alliance. The party's president was Peter Kalangula, previously the president of Namibian National Democratic Party (NNDP) and the Ovambo leader in the DTA. The party's membership was mainly Ovambo, formed by former supporters of the NNDP, and managed to get control over the Ovambo Legislative Assembly which was the administration of the self-governed bantustan of Ovamboland. The CDA existed until 1989 when it merged with the United Democratic Front.

== See also ==
- List of political parties in Namibia
