= Christopher Watts =

English Anglican bishop

Christopher Charles Watts, sometimes called Charles Christopher Watts (6 May 1877 – July 1958), was an Anglican bishop. He served in the Anglican Church of Southern Africa as Bishop of St Helena and later as Bishop of Damaraland.

== Early life ==
Born in Kensworth, where his father, George Edward Oscar Watts, was Vicar, Watts was educated at Shrewsbury School and Corpus Christi College, Cambridge, graduating BA in 1899 and proceeding to MA (Cantab) in 1904.

== Career ==
Watts was ordained a deacon by Mandell Creighton, Bishop of London, in St Paul's Cathedral at Trinitytide, 1900, and a priest by Arthur Winnington-Ingram, Bishop of London, in St Paul's at Trinity, 1901, serving as assistant curate of St Mark's, Noel Park. In 1907, he went out to Southern Africa and began work as Priest-in-charge of Mbabane in Swaziland in the Diocese of Zululand, where in January 1908 he became the founding schoolmaster of St Mark's European School and St Mark's Coloured School. In 1917, he was appointed as Canon of St Peter's Cathedral, Vryheid and from 1918 he served as Archdeacon of Swaziland.

He returned to England in 1927, to his old parish of St Mark's, Noel Park, where he served as Vicar until 1929. In 1930, he assumed the duties of the Warden of Zonnebloem College, Cape Town. In 1931, however, he was chosen to be Bishop of St Helena, being consecrated in St. George's Cathedral, Cape Town, on St Barnabas' Day, 11 June 1931 by Francis Phelps, Archbishop of Cape Town, assisted by Theodore Gibson, Bishop of Kimberley and Kuruman, and Joseph Williams, retired Bishop of St John's. He was enthroned in St Paul's Cathedral, St Helena, on 12 July 1931.

Watts served as Administrator of the Diocese of Damaraland in 1934–1935, and in 1935 was translate to become the second Bishop of Damaraland. He resigned his See in December 1938 and returned to live in South Africa. He served as Rector of Victoria West with Carnarvon, in the Diocese of Cape Town (1939–1940); and as Rector of Knysna (1940–1946); and Priest-in-charge of Riversdale (1946–1947), both in the Diocese of George. He retired in 1947.

== Personal life ==
On 4 April 1929, at St Peter's Church, Ealing, Watts married Madeline Beatrice Adams, a daughter of the late Robert Patten Adams, a judge of the Supreme Court of Tasmania. Both were in their fifties and had not been married before.

Anglican Communion titles
Preceded by William Holbech	Bishop of St Helena; 1931–1935	Succeeded by Charles Aylen
Preceded by Nelson Fogarty	Bishop of Damaraland; 1935–1938	Succeeded by George Tobias
