= Hugh Edwardes =

Anglican priest

Hugh Latimer Gilmore Edwardes was an Anglican priest in the last decade of the 19th century and the first half of the 20th century, most notably Archdeacon of Port Elizabeth from 1933 to 1944 until his death.

Edwardes was educated at Hatfield College, Durham. He was ordained deacon in 1894, and priest in 1904. After curacies in Preston, Nether Hoyland and Jersey he went out to South Africa in 1873. He served at Grahamstown, Port Alfred, Cradock and Port Elizabeth.

He died on 12 July 1953.
