= Thomas Powell (archdeacon of Port Elizabeth) =

Thomas Bertram Powell was a twentieth century Anglican priest, most notably Archdeacon of Port Elizabeth from 1949 to 1964.

Powell was educated at Pembroke College, Oxford and Wells Theological College. He was ordained deacon in 1920, and priest in 1921. After Curacies in Mexborough, Doncaster and Hong Kong he went to South Africa in 1929. he served at Grahamstown, East London and Port Elizabeth, where he was Rector of St Cuthbert's Church.
