= Nelson Fogarty =

Anglican bishop in Namibia (1871–1933)

- Born: Nelson Wellesley Fogarty; 13 September 1871; Canterbury, Kent, England
- Died: 8 April 1933 (aged 61); Sea Point, Cape Town, South Africa
- Education: The King's School, Canterbury; St Augustine's Missionary College
- Occupation: Anglican bishop
- Relatives: Pat Fogarty (granddaughter)

Nelson Wellesley Fogarty (13 September 1871 – 8 April 1933) was the first Anglican Bishop of Damaraland (Namibia) from 1924 to 1933.

== Biography ==
Nelson Wellesley Fogarty was born on 13 September 1871 in Canterbury, Kent, England, the son of John Evans Fogarty and his wife Mary Ann Mills.

He was educated at The King's School, Canterbury, before entering St Augustine's Missionary College in 1890. (He was made an Honorary Fellow in 1924.) After achieving a first-class pass in the Preliminary Theological Examination in 1893, he went out to South Africa, and was licensed as a catechist in the parish of Stellenbosch, in the Anglican Diocese of Cape Town, on 24 October 1893. He was made deacon by the Metropolitan bishop of Cape Town, William West Jones, on 21 September 1894, and licensed as assistant curate of St. Saviour's church, Claremont in Cape Town. He moved to Oudtshoorn in 1895, being licensed as assistant curate of St. Jude's church, Oudtshoorn on 26 March 1895, and serving as acting chaplain to the Oudtshoorn Volunteer Rifles. He was ordained priest by William West Jones in St. George's Cathedral, Cape Town, on 8 March 1896.

In 1897, he became chaplain to the Bishop of Mashonaland, William Thomas Gaul, and to the Railway Mission, in what is now the Church of the Province of Central Africa, and during the Anglo-Boer War was chaplain to the Southern Rhodesian contingent, being awarded the Queen's South Africa Medal, with two clasps. In 1901, he took up an appointment in Basutoland (Lesotho), then part of the Diocese of Bloemfontein, as principal of St Mary's Training College, Thlotse Heights. In 1904, he became Director of the Government Industrial School, Maseru. He served as a Canon of Bloemfontein Cathedral between 1912 and 1920.

Having served as a chaplain with the Union Defence Forces in German South-West Africa during 1915, he was appointed as Archdeacon of Damaraland and Vicar-General for the Metropolitan of the Church of the Province of South Africa in South-West Africa in 1916.

When the missionary Diocese of Damaraland was formed in 1924, he was chosen to be its first bishop, and consecrated as such in St. George's Cathedral, Cape Town on Quinquagesima Sunday, 2 March 1924 by the Archbishop of Cape Town, assisted by the Bishops of George, Bloemfontein, and St. John's, Kaffraria, as well as the Coadjutor Bishop of Cape Town, and Bishop Gaul.

During his episcopate, St George's Cathedral in Windhoek was built.

He died in Sea Point, Cape Town, on 8 April 1933, aged 61.

Fogarty was "described as 'a man of fine physique, more than average good looks and a forceful preacher'. He was friendly and simple-hearted, yet of a forceful character, and often laboured single-handed in remote districts to further the work of the Church" (Boucher).

His granddaughter was the illustrator Pat Fogarty.

== Bibliography ==
- Bishopscourt Archives (n.d.). Catechists Licensed, 1848-1912. (Unpublished manuscript).
- Bishopscourt Archives (n.d.). Letters of Orders, 1848-1985. (Unpublished manuscript).
- Bishopscourt Archives (n.d.). Licences to Clergy, 1848-1963. (Unpublished manuscript).
- Bishopscourt Archives (n.d.). Consecration of Bishops, 1847-1986. (Unpublished manuscript).
- Legg, J.P., ed. (1899). Church Directory of the Church of the Province of South Africa.
- Crockford's Clerical Directory. 1921–1922.
- The Anchor. March 1924.
- Dictionary of South African Biography, Vol IV. Pretoria: Human Sciences Research Council. 1981. ISBN 0-409-09183-9.

Preceded by Office did not exist	Anglican Bishop of Damaraland (Namibia); 1924-1933	Succeeded by Charles Christopher Watts
