= Diocese of Namibia =

Anglican diocese in Namibia

Location
- Ecclesiastical province: Southern Africa
- Archdeaconries: 11

Statistics
- Parishes: 66

Information
- Rite: Anglican
- Cathedral: St. George's Cathedral, Windhoek

Current leadership
- Bishop: The Rev Dr Patrick Djuulume

Website
- www.anglicanchurchsa.org

The Diocese of Namibia is part of the Anglican Church of Southern Africa, which is itself part of the Anglican Communion. The diocese, which covers the whole country of Namibia, was originally known as the Diocese of Damaraland. Most of the Anglicans in Namibia live in Ovamboland in the north of the country and speak the Oshikwanyama language.

== History ==
The first Christian missionaries in Namibia were Methodists, who worked mainly in the South of the country, then called Namaqualand. They were followed by German Lutherans of the Rhenish Mission Society, who were mainly based in the central part of the country around Windhoek, and in Damaraland, immediately north of Windhoek.

In the 1870s Germany claimed Namaqualand, Damaraland, Ovamboland and neighbouring territories as German South West Africa. Lutheran missionaries from the Finnish Missionary Society went to Ovamboland, and settled among the Ndonga-speaking people there.

=== Beginnings ===
In 1915, during the First World War, South African forces invaded and the following year an Anglican priest, Nelson Fogarty, established the first Anglican presence, initially to minister to the South African troops and civilians who had followed the military occupation. After the war South Africa administered the territory under a League of Nations mandate and Nelson Fogarty began to think of ways of making the Anglican presence more permanent by evangelising the local people. It was established that the Finnish mission in Ovamboland had not really established churches among the Kwanyama people who lived in northern Ovamboland and southern Angola.

In 1924 the bishops of the Church of the Province of Southern Africa decided to create a missionary diocese in South West Africa, with Nelson Fogarty as bishop based in Windhoek. George Tobias, a missionary priest, went to Ovamboland and established St Mary's Mission at Odibo on the Angola border. Eventually Odibo, as the Anglican centre in Ovamboland, had a church, a school and a hospital.

Parishes were established to the east of Odibo and were about 15 km (9.3 mi) apart with most just south of the Namibia-Angola border. Since the Kwanyama people straddled the border, many church members lived in Angola but crossed the border to attend church services.

=== Odendaal and persecution ===
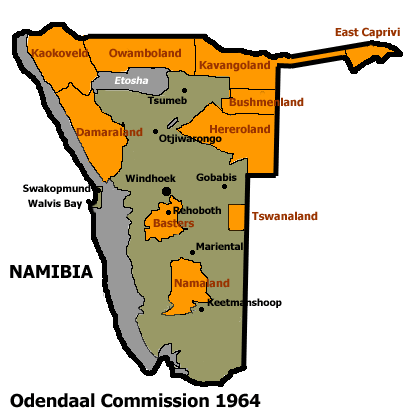

In 1962 the South African government set up the Odendaal Commission which recommended that the apartheid policy be implemented in South West Africa, including the setting up of bantustans. Not all the recommendations of the Odendaal Commission were implemented. In 1969, shortly after Colin Winter became bishop, the South African government undertook a "rearrangement", which would make Namibia more like a province of South Africa. Control of several government departments was transferred to Pretoria in order to apply the "homelands" policy.

This also led to divisions in the church, where some Anglicans wanted a separate diocese of Ovamboland, which would consist, in effect, of the "homeland" designated by the Odendaal Plan. Those who opposed this plan pointed out that it would mean importing apartheid into the church, because there would be a diocese based in Windhoek which would be overwhelmingly white and another based in Odibo which would be overwhelmingly black.

Ovambo nationalists who supported the "homelands" policy, led by a deacon, the Revd Petrus Kalangula, and encouraged by South African government agents, broke away to form the "Ovamboland Anglican Church". Most Ovambo Anglicans, however, preferred the idea of a united church in a united Namibia, and rejected both the homeland government of Ushona Shiimi and its religious arm, established by Petrus Kalangula. This crisis took up a great deal of the time of Bishop Colin Winter in the early part of his episcopate.

The turning point came for Namibia on 21 June 1971 when the World Court delivered its judgment that South Africa's occupation of Namibia was illegal. The South African government asked the Lutheran churches for their opinion on the judgment and their answer came on 18 July 1971 in the form of two letters, one in the form of an open letter to the South African Prime Minister, John Vorster, and the other a pastoral letter read in all congregations of the Evangelical Lutheran OvamboKavango Church and the Evangelical Lutheran Church in South West Africa. The letters came as something of a shock for the South African government for they accused the government of human rights abuses in its occupation of Namibia. Until then the Lutherans had been regarded as "good" by the South African government and not given to criticising government policies such as the Roman Catholic and Anglican churches.

Anglican bishop Colin Winter fully supported the Lutheran stand, while the Roman Catholic bishops offered qualified support.

==== "A form of slavery" ====
Soon after this there was a rather strange series of events that led to the deportation of Bishop Colin Winter. David de Beer, the diocesan treasurer, was asked to speak to a student group at the University of the Witwatersrand (his alma mater) on Namibia. Among other things he spoke about the contract labour system, saying that it was a form of slavery, and mentioned an incident in which the supervisor of a group of contact workers had threatened them with immediate dismissal if they bought Bibles, on the grounds that they were "communist Bibles". So the employers controlled the workers' leisure time, and told them what they could or could not read.

A journalist, who had come to report another event that had been cancelled had wandered into the room, and wrote a brief report. This report was picked up by Die Suidwester, the National Party newspaper, and made front-page news, leading to a week of Anglican-bashing by that newspaper. Following that the Commissioner-General for Ovamboland, Jannie de Wet, said in a radio broadcast on Radio Ovambo that the contract labour system was not a form of slavery, because the workers could go home whenever they liked. A group in Walvis Bay, after hearing the broadcast, wrote to other contract workers all over the south of Namibia, suggesting that they should take "the boer Jannie de Wet" at his word, and all go home. The result was a highly successful contract workers strike, which signified a new mood of boldness following the decision of the World Court.

In 1972-02 twelve contract workers from Windhoek appeared in court, charged with being ringleaders of the strike and Bishop Colin Winter arranged for their legal defence. At about the same time, four members of the congregation of St Luke's Church, Epinga, were shot dead by South African security forces after a Sunday service. Bishop Winter was issued with deportation orders, as were three members of his staff.

=== Bishop in exile ===
In November 1972 the diocesan synod asked Colin Winter not to resign as bishop, but to remain as bishop in exile. To ensure that episcopal ministry would still be provided a priest, Richard Wood was elected and consecrated as suffragan bishop, but was himself deported on 16 June 1975.

Edward Morrow, who had gone to Windhoek from Durban to set up a building training scheme in 1970, had just finished training for the priesthood in England and was hastily ordained and sent back to Namibia as vicar-general. He received a deportation order on 14 July 1978.

By that time James Kauluma, who had left Namibia 12 years earlier to study overseas, had been elected and consecrated as suffragan bishop to replace Richard Wood. Since he had been born in Namibia, he could not be deported. On the death of Colin Winter in 1981, James Kauluma was elected as diocesan bishop and so became the sixth Anglican Bishop of Namibia and the first who was Namibian born.

== Bishops ==
- Nelson Wellesley Fogarty (1924-1933)
- Charles Christopher Watts (1935-1938)
- George Wolfe Robert Tobias (1939-1949)
- Cecil William Alderson (1950-1953)
- John Dacre Vincent (1952-1960)
- Robert Herbert Mize, Jr. (1960-1968)
- Colin O'Brien Winter (1968-1981)
  - Richard Wood (suffragan bishop; 1973–1977)
  - James Hamupanda Kauluma (suffragan bishop; 1977–1981)
- James Hamupanda Kauluma (1981-1998 – first Namibian bishop and first called "Bishop of Namibia")
- Hidulika Hilukilwah 1992-2002 (Suffragan bishop)
- Nehemiah Shihala Hamupembe (1998-2005)
- Nathaniel Ndaxuma Nakwatumbah (2006–2015)
- Luke Pato (2016 -2021)
- Patrick Djuulume (2022- )

== Coat of arms ==
The diocese registered a coat of arms at the Bureau of Heraldry in 1982 : Argent, on a cross Gules an anchor Argent, within a bordure per pale Azure and Or; the shield ensigned with a mitre proper.
