= Colin Winter =

Irish-British Anglican bishop in Namibia

The Right Reverend Colin Winter
- Bishop of Damaraland (or Namibia)
- Province: Southern Africa
- Diocese: Diocese of Damaraland (or Namibia)
- Installed: 1968
- Predecessor: Bob Mize
- Successor: James Kauluma
- Other posts: Dean of St George's Cathedral, Windhoek

Orders
- Ordination: 1956 (deacon); 1957 (priest)
- Consecration: 1968

Personal details
- Born: 10 October 1928 Stoke-on-Trent, Staffordshire, England
- Died: 17 November 1981 (aged 53) Bethnal Green, Greater London, England
- Denomination: Anglican
- Residence: Namibia International Peace Centre, Cephas St, London E1 (exile & death)
- Spouse: Mary Jackson Winter
- Children: 5
- Education: Loughborough College; Lincoln College, Oxford; Ely Theological College.

Colin O'Brien Winter (10 October 1928 – 17 November 1981), was an English Anglican bishop, who served as Bishop of Damaraland, a diocese of the Church of the Province of Southern Africa (now the Anglican Church of Southern Africa) coextensive with the territory of what is now Namibia during the apartheid era. (Note: The diocese of Damaraland (now the diocese of Namibia) was distinct from the smaller bantustan of the same name created by the government of South Africa.)

== Early life and career ==
Born in Stoke-on-Trent, Staffordshire, United Kingdom, Winter was educated at Loughborough College, Lincoln College, Oxford and Ely Theological College. (Note: Located in Ely, Cambridgeshire, Ely Theological College was founded in 1876 and closed in 1964.) He was ordained deacon in the Church of England in 1956 and became curate of St Andrew's Church in Eastbourne. He was ordained priest in 1957 and married Mary Jackson Winter in Bradford, Yorkshire in 1953.

Winter spent six years as a parish priest at St. Francis Church in Simonstown, South Africa, in the Anglican Diocese of Cape Town. He wrote a book, Just People, about his experiences as a parish priest there.

== Namibia ==
In 1964, Winter became Dean of St George's Cathedral in Windhoek in what was then known as South West Africa, a former German colony controlled by South Africa, later known as Namibia.

He was elected Bishop of Damaraland (Namibia) in 1968, following the deportation of his predecessor, Bob Mize by the South African government. Most of the Anglicans in Namibia lived in Ovamboland, where the South African government was trying to apply its "homelands" policy, and this caused tensions in the church. A vocal opponent of South Africa's racial separation policies, Winter took a strong stand on behalf of migrant workers in his diocese, who included many Anglicans from Ovamboland.

During 1971, the Nationalist-supporting newspaper Die Suidwester launched a series of attacks on the Anglican Church in general, and Winter in particular. In January 1971 the attacks were related to Winter's tolling of the cathedral bell with special lunchtime prayers following the arrest of the Anglican Dean of Johannesburg, Gonville Aubie ffrench-Beytagh.

External images
- https://www.klausdierks.com/images/Nujoma_1960s.jpg Sam Nujoma (right) with Winter and Shapua Kaukungua, 1960s. Original source: Namibia State Archive.
- https://web.archive.org/web/20110817153808/http://halber.typepad.com/.a/6a013487b26996970c0154329babc5970c-pi Colin Winter, c. 1971. Photo by Stephen Hayes.
- https://web.archive.org/web/20160313145125/https://khanya.files.wordpress.com/2009/07/cwinter1.jpg?w=299&h=273 Colin Winter, July 1969. Photo by Stephen Hayes.

=== The strike of 1971–1972 ===
In December 1971, most of the Ovambo contract workers in Namibia went on strike. After a week most of the strikers went home to Ovamboland, and a state of emergency was declared there, with meetings banned. Most people in Ovamboland did not read the government gazette, and did not know of the ban and its implications. On 30 January 1972, South African security forces shot members of the congregation of St Luke's Church, Epinga, on the Angolan border, when they were going home from church. Four were killed and two wounded, but the incident was reported in the South African press as a skirmish with "terrorists". Winter gathered information on the shootings and on 7 February released to the world press a "Statement on the Epinga Shootings" in which he described "[a] peaceful crowd of Ovambo Anglicans, many carrying prayer and hymn books" on whom the police opened fire.

Several of the strike leaders were arrested and charged with various offences, and Winter offered to try to help them to pay for their defence. At first they were reluctant, but eventually they agreed, and advocate Brian O'Linn was engaged to represent them when the trial began on 25 January 1972.

=== The Richard Wurmbrand controversy ===
At that time, when he was returning from a meeting in South Africa, Winter found himself sitting next to pastor Richard Wurmbrand on the plane. Wurmbrand had been invited to speak at a series of meetings in Windhoek by a Dutch Reformed minister, Dana Minnaar. Wurmbrand invited Winter to join him in a press conference at the airport, but Winter declined, saying that, though he sympathised with the persecuted Christians in Romania, Christians in Namibia were also being persecuted.

At his press conference, Wurmbrand denounced Winter for failing to join him, and the following day Die Suidwester had a front-page banner headline "Winter confesses". On one side, under the main heading, was Winter's "confession" that he was paying for the legal defence of the strike leaders, while on the other side, under the same headline, was Wurmbrand's denunciation of Winter, referring to bishops and priests who went around stirring up trouble in Ovamboland, where the people were "ignorant savages" who knew no better.

Winter then went to see Wurmbrand at Dominee Dana Minnaar's house, hoping to clear up misunderstandings and bring about reconciliation. Winter said that he sympathised with the plight of persecuted Christians in Romania, but that Romania was far away, and Christians in Namibia had to face the evils of apartheid, which were far more immediate. Wurmbrand said that this was being parochial; South Africa did not aim at world domination, but communism did, therefore Winter should concentrate his energies on fighting communism. As he was leaving, Winter knelt down in front of Wurmbrand and asked for his blessing. Wurmbrand refused at first, but Winter insisted, saying that he wanted the blessing of one who had suffered for his faith.

Die Suidwester followed this up with another attack on Winter, calling him a communist, and with more denunciations from Pastor Wurmrand. The article also attacked William Booth, a New York judge who had been sent by the International Commission of Jurists to observe the strike trial.

Winter then asked Die Suidwester to apologise for its attacks, and said that if it did not do so, he would sue the newspaper and its editor, Frans van Zyl. Frans van Zyl was a member of the South West Africa Legislative Assembly, and his brother Eben van Zijl was a member of the Executive Committee. The Legislative Assembly held a special night session to amend an ordinance that allowed the Administrator-in-Executive Committee to deport people from the territory. The ordinance was originally passed to enable the deportation of enemy aliens in World War II. The Ordinance was hastily amended to preclude appeal to the courts, and as soon as the amendment had been gazetted the Administrator-in-Executive Committee issued deportation orders for Winter; a priest, Stephen Hayes; the diocesan secretary, David de Beer and a teacher, Antoinette Halberstadt. After leaving Namibia, David de Beer and Stephen Hayes were later banned in South Africa.

== Exile ==
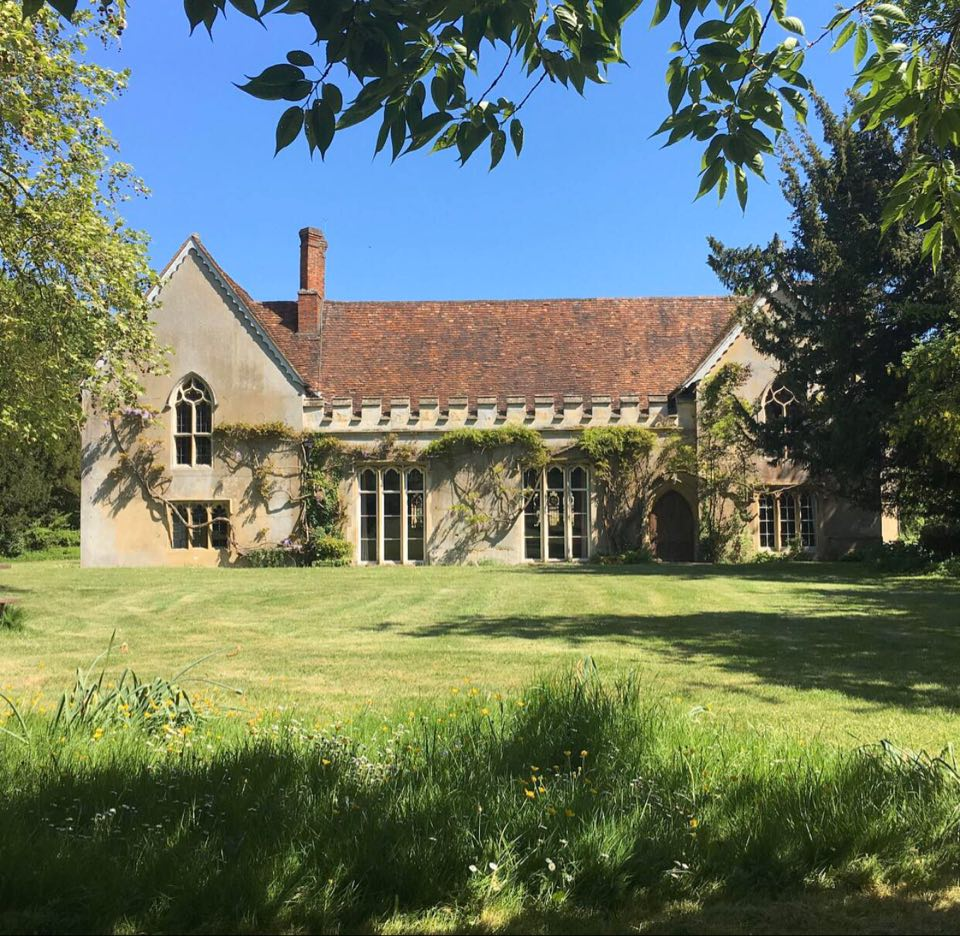
The Abbey, Sutton Courtenay, which Winter used to house the Namibia International Peace Centre in the 1970s.

Following his expulsion, he remained, at the request of the synod of his diocese, "bishop-in-exile", continuing to speak and write on behalf of independence for Namibia and ordaining clergy to serve there. He was known variously as Bishop of Damaraland(-in-exile) and Bishop of Namibia(-in-exile); during his exile, his eventual successor Kauluma was elected and consecrated suffragan bishop for his diocese. Newspaper publisher David Astor lent Winter The Abbey, Sutton Courtenay that originally belonged to the historic Abingdon Abbey to house the Namibia International Peace Centre.

Although he had been a conscientious objector against British National Service, Winter defended the South West Africa People's Organization (SWAPO), an armed independence movement that later became Namibia's dominant political party. He died of a heart attack at age 53 in exile in London, at his home in East London: the second location of the Namibia International Peace Centre, in Bethnal Green.

== Books by Winter ==
- The Breaking Process. SCM-Canterbury Press Limited. 1981. ISBN 978-0-334-00139-3.
- Namibia: Story of a Bishop in Exile. Grand Rapids: William B. Eerdmans. 1977. ISBN 978-0-8028-1664-1.
- Just people. SPCK. 1971. ISBN 9780281026043.

For George & John - a collection of children's stories; year 1973; publisher Southern African Christian Alliance (Texas)

== Notes and references ==
- Winter, Colin (1981). The Breaking Process. SCM-Canterbury Press Limited. ISBN 978-0-334-00139-3.
- Winter, Colin (1977). Namibia: Story of a Bishop in Exile. Grand Rapids: William B. Eerdmans. ISBN 978-0-8028-1664-1.
- Winter, Colin (1971). Just people. SPCK. ISBN 9780281026043.
- Die Suidwester, 25 January 1971
- Die Suidwester, 15 February 1972
- Die Suidwester, 18 February 1972

Anglican Church of Southern Africa titles
Preceded by Bob Mize	Bishop of Damaraland; 1968–1981	Succeeded by James Kauluma
