= Democratic Co-operative Party =

Historical Namibian political party

The Democratic Co-operative Party (DEMKOP), was a small local political party in Ovamboland, Namibia led by Johannes Nangutuuala. The party opposed South African occupation of South West Africa and joined the SWAPO Youth League at rallies. Nangutuuala was publicly flogged for his political activism. Established in 1973 it was active only for a short while; by 1975 its activities had ceased, and its leader Nangutuuala had taken up work with the South African administration in Ovamboland.
