= Ministry of Defence (Namibia) =

Namibian government ministry

The Ministry of Defence and Veteran Affairs (MODVA) is the government department responsible for the administration of military affairs and veterans affairs in Namibia. It was established as Ministry of Defence (MOD) at Namibian independence in 1990. In 2020 the portfolio of veteran affairs was added to defence after the Ministry of Veteran Affairs had been dissolved in 2015. The first Namibian defence minister was Peter Mweshihange, the current Minister of Defence and Veteran Affairs is Frans Kapofi.

Apart from formulating Namibia's defence policies the Ministry of Defence is the headquarters for the Namibian Defence Force (NDF). The NDF owns August 26 Group, a holding company for a number of commercial entities related to the military, among them Namibia's only arms manufacturer Windhoeker Maschinenfabrik.

The political leader of MODVA is the minister while the accounting officer is the executive director (ED), deputised by a deputy executive director. The deputy ED heads the Department of Defence secretariat and administration. This department is made up of six directorates: Education and Civil Training, Construction and Maintenance, Finance, Defence Central Staff, Procurement Research and Development, and Defence Legal Advisor. All the directorates are headed by civilian directors. In exceptional cases, commissioned officers with the rank of Brigadier general can be appointed directors in the department.

== Ministers of Defence ==
- Peter Mweshihange (1990–1995)
- Philemon Malima (1995–1997)
- Colonel (ret) Erkki Nghimtina (1997–2005)
- Major General (ret) Charles Namoloh (2005–2012)
- Nahas Angula (2012–2015)
- Penda Ya Ndakolo (2015–2020)
- Rear Admiral (ret) Peter Vilho (2020-2021)
- Frans Kapofi (2021-current)
