= Ovamboland =

Bantustan in South West Africa (1968–1989)

Coordinates: 17.9167°S 15.9500°E

- 1968–1989
- Flag

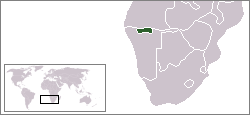
- Location of Ovamboland within South West Africa.

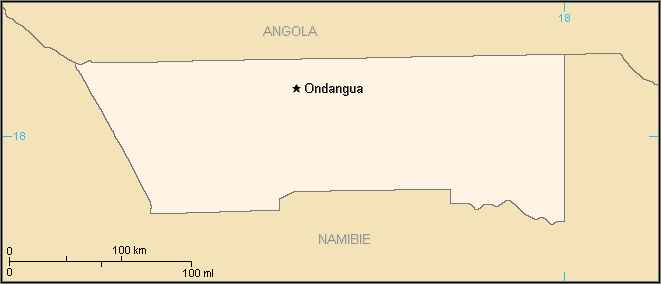
- Map of the Bantustan
- Status: Bantustan (1968–1980); Second-tier authority (1980–1989)
- Capital: Oshakati
- History
  - Odendaal Plan: 1968
  - Re-integrated into Namibia: May 1989
- Currency: South African rand
Preceded by	Succeeded by
South West Africa	Namibia

Ovamboland, also referred to as Owamboland, was a Bantustan and later a non-geographic ethnic-based second-tier authority, the Representative Authority of the Ovambos, in South West Africa (present-day Namibia).

The apartheid government stated that the goal was for it to be a self-governing homeland for the Ovambo people. Practically, however, it was intended by the apartheid government as a reservation that forced them into cheap labour by limiting movement; Ovambo men were not allowed outside Ovamboland unless they signed as a contract labourer for 16 months, while women were not allowed out at all.

The term originally referred to the parts of northern Namibia inhabited by the Ovambo ethnic group: namely, the area controlled by the traditional Ovambo kingdoms in pre-colonial and early colonial times, such as Ondonga, Ongandjera, and Oukwanyama. Its endonym is Ovambo ~ Owambo.

== Background ==
In the 1960s, South Africa, which was administering South West Africa under a League of Nations mandate, came under increased international pressure regarding its minority White rule over the majority of Blacks. The solution envisaged by South Africa—the Odendaal Plan—was to separate the white and the non-white population, grant self-government to the isolated black territories, and thus make Whites the majority population in the vast remainder of the country. Moreover, it was envisaged that by separating each ethnic group and confining people by law to their restricted areas, discrimination by race would automatically disappear.

The demarcated territories were called the Bantustans, and the remainder of the land was called the Police Zone. Forthwith, all non-white people employed in the Police Zone became migrant workers, and pass laws were established to police movement in and out of the Bantustans.

The combined territory of all Bantustans was roughly equal in size to the Police Zone. However, all Bantustans were predominantly rural and excluded major towns. All harbours, most of the railway network and the tarred road infrastructure, all larger airports, the profitable diamond areas and the national parks were situated in the Police Zone. An exception to this was Rehoboth, the Bantustan status of which was similar to the autonomy previous under German rule.

=== Finnish missionary work ===
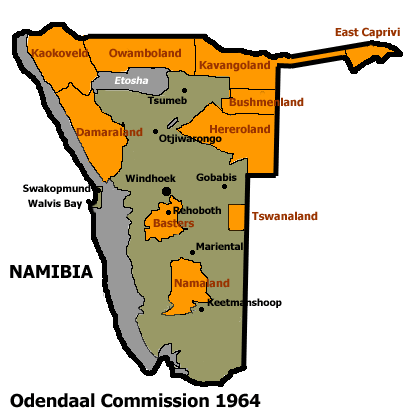
Allocation of land to Bantustans according to the Odendaal Plan. Ovamboland is central north

The main religion of Ovamboland is Lutheranism, which is why Finnish missionaries, such as Martti Rautanen (who also developed the local literary language), and later Heikki Saari, among others, have worked in the area since the 1870s. As a result of the work of the Finnish envoys, the Ovambo-Kawango Evangelical Lutheran Church was born in 1954 (since 1984 the Evangelical Lutheran Church of Namibia). In their footsteps, there are many given names of Finnish origin in the local nomenclature, such as Martta, Toivo, Onni, Helmi and Martti. In the 1920s, there was even a project planned by Finnish university scholars lobbying to make Ovamboland the first overseas colony of Finland, though this never transpired.

== Administrative history ==
=== Bantustan (1968–1980) ===
Ovamboland, set up in 1968, was the first fully functional Bantustan in South West Africa. As the Ovambo people already resided here, resettlement was not necessary. Furthermore, the area already had an existing structure of governance in the form of traditional authorities. The population was, however, split into those who farmed near their homes, and those who worked in mines, factories, on farms and in households outside the Bantustan. Self-government was granted in 1973.

Ovamboland was the setting of a protracted insurgency waged by the People's Liberation Army of Namibia (PLAN) during the South African Border War.

=== Representative authority (1980–1989) ===
Following the Turnhalle Constitutional Conference the system of Bantustans was replaced in 1980 by Representative Authorities which functioned on the basis of ethnicity only and were no longer based on geographically defined areas.

The Representative Authority of the Ovambos had executive and legislative competencies, being made up of elected Legislative Assemblies which would appoint Executive Committees led by chairmen.

As second-tier authorities, forming an intermediate tier between central and local government, the representative authorities had responsibility for land tenure, agriculture, education up to primary level, teachers' training, health services, and social welfare and pensions and their Legislative Assemblies had the ability to pass legislation known as Ordinances.

=== Since independence of Namibia ===
Ovamboland, like other homelands in South West Africa, was abolished in May 1989 at the start of the transition to independence. The region is now commonly referred to as The North but the term Ovamboland is still in use. More than half of the entire population lives here on just 6% of the Namibian territory.

== See also ==
- Leaders of Ovamboland
- 1971–72 Ovambo & Kavango contract workers strike
- Democratic Co-operative Party
