= 2A28 Grom =

Main gun on the BMP-1 and BMD-1 infantry fighting vehicles

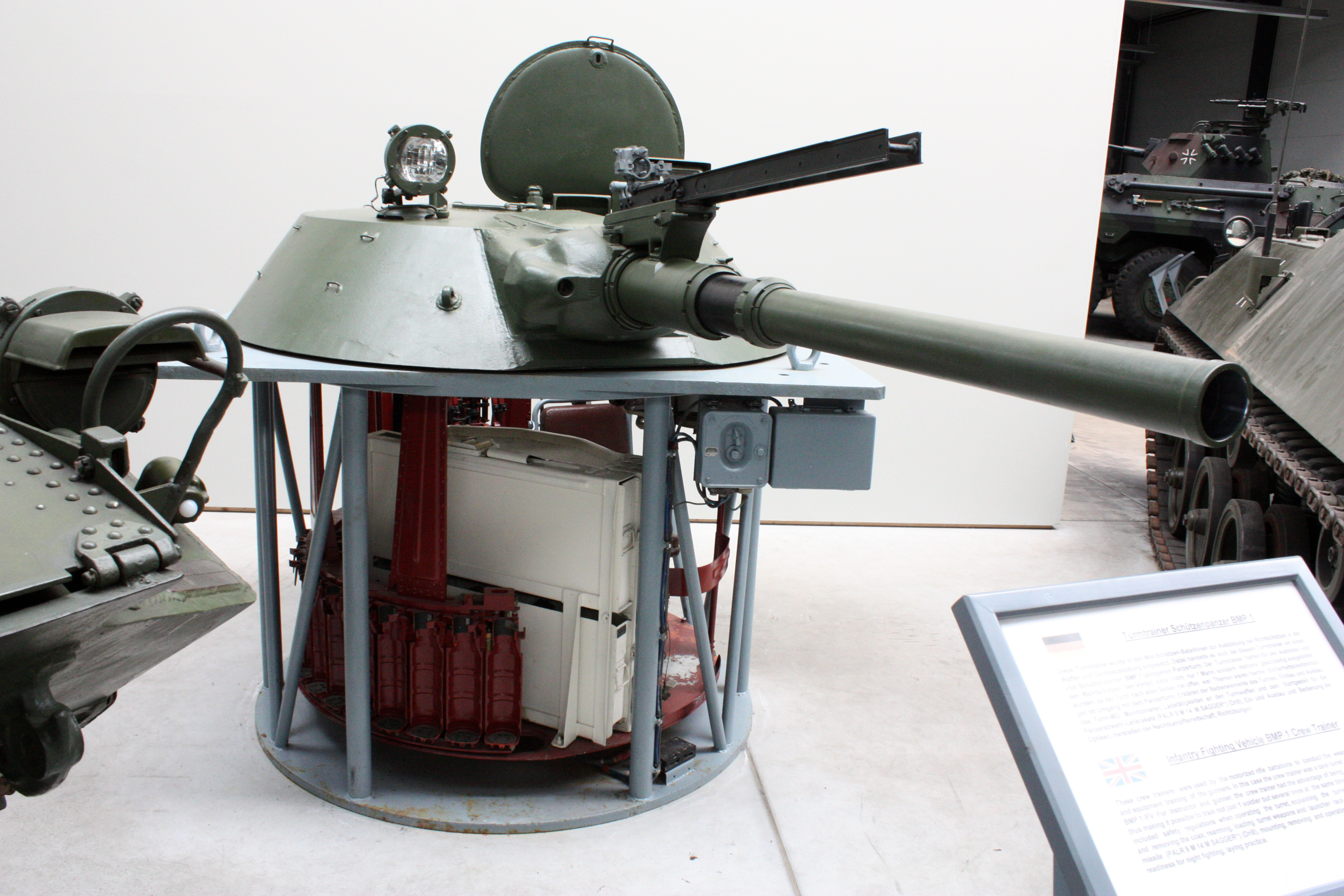
- Detailed view of a BMP-1 turret showing the 73 mm gun tube of the 2A28
- Type: Smoothbore low-pressure cannon
- Place of origin: Soviet Union

Service history
- Used by: See BMP-1 Service History
- Wars: See list of conflicts

Production history
- Designer: KBP
- Designed: Early 1960s
- Manufacturer: KBP
- Produced: 1966–present

Specifications
- Mass: 115 kg
- Length: 1195 mm
- Width: 218 mm
- Height: 322 mm
- Shell: PG-15V (HEAT), OG-15V (HE-FRAG), PG-15VN (HEAT-DP)
- Caliber: 73 mm
- Barrels: 1
- Elevation: -4° to +15° (aimed fire), +33° (maximum non-aimed)
- Traverse: 20 °/s horizontal, 6 °/s vertical
- Rate of fire: 8 rounds per minute
- Muzzle velocity: 400 m/s at the muzzle, 665 m/s maximum (PG-15V); 290 m/s at the muzzle (OG-15V)
- Maximum firing range: 1300 m (PG-15V), 4500 m (OG-15V)
- Sights: 1PN22M, 1PN22M2

The 2A28 Grom also known as KBP 2A28 Grom, is the main armament of the Soviet-designed BMP-1 and BMD-1 infantry fighting vehicles. It is a 73 mm low pressure smoothbore semi-automatic gun with a wedge breech block. Development of the 2A28 Grom was directly linked to that of the SPG-9 recoilless gun; both fired projectiles similar to rocket-propelled grenades.

== Development history ==
During the early 1960s, the Soviet Armed Forces issued a requirement for a new infantry transporter that was highly mobile, sufficiently armed to destroy comparable Western vehicles such as the M59 and the Schützenpanzer Lang HS.30, and allowed embarked infantrymen to fight from within its crew compartment. This concept evolved into the BMP-1.

== Description ==
The gun is relatively compact and weighs 115 kilograms (254 lb). In the BMP, the gun is brought to bear by an electric motor, with a manual mechanical backup. The maximum horizontal and vertical traverse speed with the electrical system is 20 °/s and 6 °/s respectively. Minimum horizontal and vertical direction rate is correspondingly 0.1 °/s and 0.07 °/s. The gun can be depressed and elevated between −4° and +33°, with aimed fire possible up to an elevation of +15°. The turret can traverse 360°. Cyclic rate of fire is between 8 and 10 rounds per minute, with the gun returning to an elevation of +3° 30' to reload after each shot if the autoloader is used.

It is fed from a forty-round mechanized conveyor double-row magazine located around the turret ring of the BMP-1. The gun is reloaded by the M3 electromechanical autoloader with ammunition conveyor, but can be reloaded by hand if necessary. The autoloader is not reliable; it can break down from vibration when the vehicle is moving at high speed over rough ground, and its operation is a danger to the gunner's fingers. With the autoloader, the gun has a rate of fire of 8 rounds per minute. These drawbacks caused the autoloader to be removed in Ob'yekt 765Sp3, Finnish BMP-1 and Swedish Pbv 501. Some units removed the autoloader altogether when new vehicles were delivered, but the mechanized ammunition conveyor magazine was retained.

== Ammunition ==
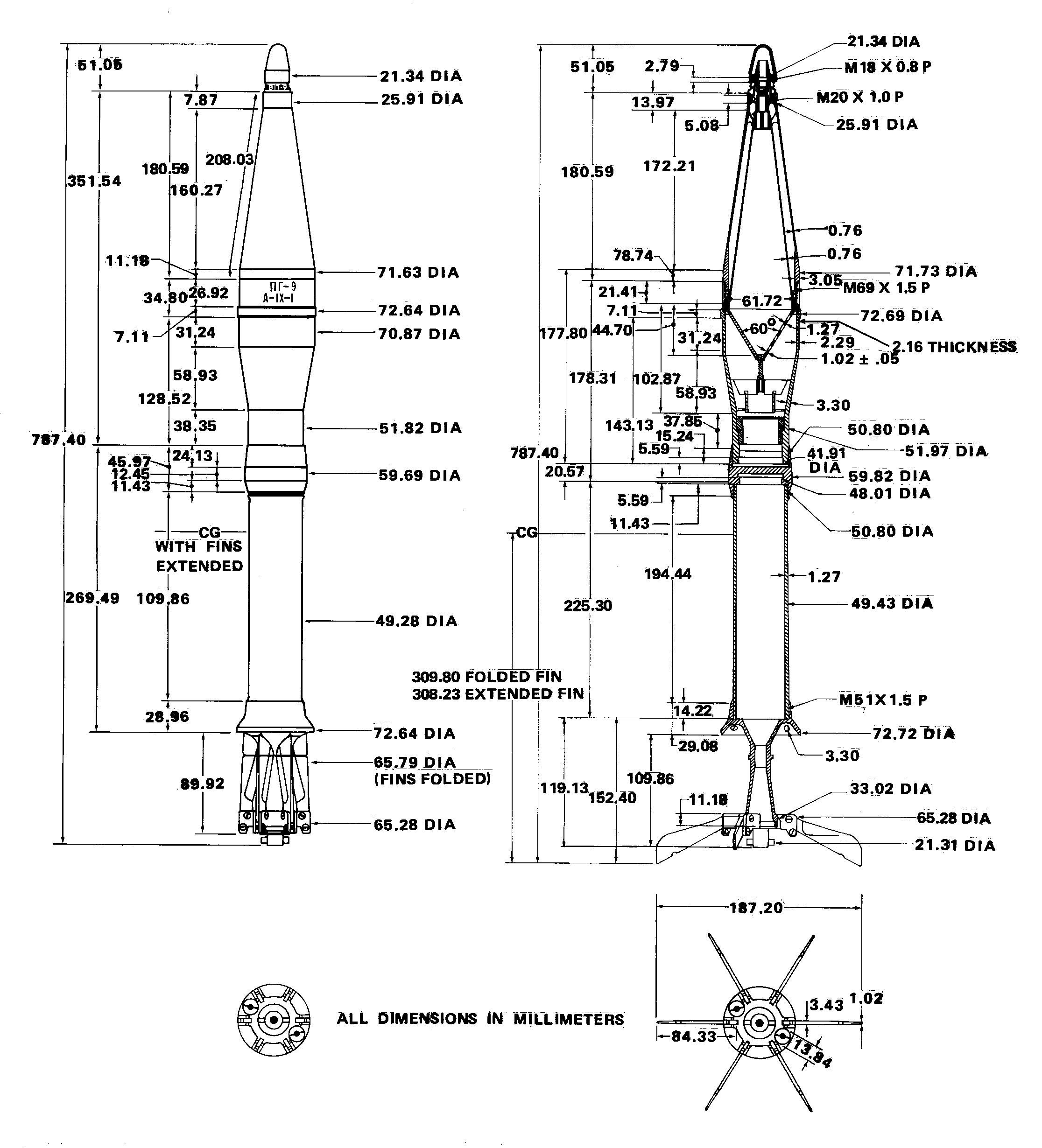
Drawing of PG-9 HEAT projectile

The 2A28 'Grom' smoothbore gun fires the same projectiles as the SPG-9 infantry light recoilless gun, but with a smaller propellant charge. Before 1974, the ammunition only consisted of high explosive anti-tank (HEAT) rounds; the PG-15V HEAT fixed fin-stabilized rocket-assisted round. After 1974, OG-15V HE-Fragmentation projectiles were introduced. In the Ob'yekt 765Sp3, the standard ammunition load is 24 PG-15V HEAT rounds and 16 OG-15V HE-Frag rounds.

The PG-15V HEAT round weighs 3.47 kilograms (7 lb 10 oz) and uses a 2.6 kg (5 lb 12 oz) PG-9 shell with a 0.322 kg (11.4 oz) RDX explosive charge in the warhead. A small PG-15P powder charge is used to boost the projectile from the gun barrel at 400 metres per second (1,300 ft/s). Once the projectile has travelled 10–20 m (33–66 ft), the rocket motor starts and accelerates it to 700 m/s (2,300 ft/s).

The OG-15V HE-Frag round weighs 4.57 kilograms (10 lb 1 oz), it uses an OG-9 shell with a 0.73 kg (1 lb 10 oz) TNT bursting charge. The muzzle velocity of the OG-9 is 290 m/s (950 ft/s). The OG-15V is loaded by hand as it is too short to be handled by the autoloader.

2A28 Grom turret has a launcher for Malyutka and Malyutka-M ATGMs.

== Performance ==
The HEAT warhead can penetrate 280–350 millimetres (11–14 in) of steel armor—more than enough to penetrate the frontal armor of NATO main battle tanks (MBT)s of the 1970s, such as the US M60A1, the British Chieftain or the German Leopard 1.

On the ranges, the PG-9 proved capable of hitting a 2-metre (6.6 ft) high target at a range of 765 metres (837 yd), while its maximum direct fire range is 1,300 metres (1,400 yd), reduced to 400 metres (440 yd) at night, due to the limitations of the night vision system. Under battlefield conditions, it has a maximum effective range of 500 metres (550 yd).

Maximum effective indirect range of the OG-15V HE-Frag round against formation targets is 4,400 metres (4,800 yd). Its effective direct fire range against small point targets is around 1,000 metres (1,100 yd).

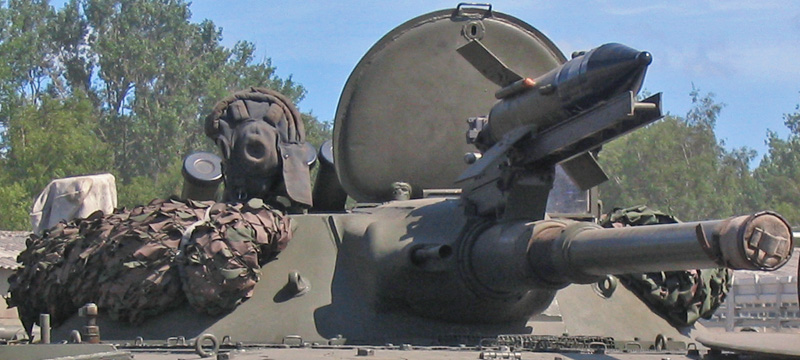
Close-up of a Czech BPzV-1's turret, 2 July 2005. Note the ATGM launcher for the 9M14M Malyutka-M

A coaxial 7.62 mm PKT machine gun is mounted to the right of the main armament for which the BMP-1 carries 2,000 rounds in belts of 250. They are stowed in two boxes under the main gun. The machine gun has a rate of fire of around 800 rounds a minute.

The 2A28 "Grom" gun and PKT coaxial machine gun cannot be accurately fired while the vehicle is moving over rough ground. This means that the BMP-1's main armament is less capable than modern stabilised autocannons, which can be fired accurately while moving. The BMP-1 is unable to engage targets using the 2A28 "Grom" gun from some hull-down positions due to its limited depression, making it vulnerable to enemy fire. The limited elevation of the main gun, its lack of firepower and inaccuracy against point targets at 500–700 metres (550–770 yd) meant that it could not fight effectively in the mountains of Afghanistan.

== Applications ==
Namibian Wer’wolf MKII MRAPs armed with the 2A28 Grom.

In Soviet and Russian service, the only other armored fighting vehicle besides the BMP-1 known to have utilized the 2A28 Grom was the BMD-1. However, it is also mounted on other BMP-1 inspired designs, like the Chinese Type 86 (WZ-501) and the Iranian Boragh.

Both the Armed Forces of the Islamic Republic of Iran and the Cuban Revolutionary Armed Forces are known to possess a number of wheeled BTR-60PB armored personnel carriers retrofitted with the complete turret and main gun assembly of the BMP-1. There is a fire support variant of the WZ-551 in Chinese service equipped with the 2A28 Grom in a modified turret. The Namibian Army currently operates a variant of the WZ-523 and the Wer'wolf MKII APC mounting the BMP-1 turret.

In May 2024, in the context of the 2022 Russian invasion of Ukraine, the Russian military was seen using a towed version of the system, seemingly cannibalized from armored vehicles.

Later, the same year in July 2024, another video appeared online showing a crudely assembled 2A28 Grom gun, still attached to BMP-1 turret ring, with civilian trailer and tractor for transportation. The video shows members of the 25th Combined Arms Army transporting the artillery piece into position, uncoupling the gun from tractor and stabilizing it on metal supports fitted on rails welded to the turret ring. This allows the gun assembly mounted inside the ring to move horizontally. The gun lays on its supports while firing, as an ordinary commercial trailer cannot provide enough resistance to the recoil of the gun.

== See also ==
- M242 Bushmaster
- 2A42
- 9M113 Konkurs
- BMP development
- BMP-1
- BMD-1
- SPG-9
