= BMP-1 service history =

Of the Soviet infantry fighting vehicle

The Soviet BMP-1 is a tracked, amphibious infantry fighting vehicle (IFV) with a long service history.

== Service history ==
=== Soviet Union ===
The BMP-1 entered service with the Soviet Army in 1966. The first unit to be equipped was the 1st Motor Rifle (renamed as Armoured) Battalion of the 339th Guards Red Banner Belostok Motor Rifle Regiment of the 120th Guards Rogachev Motor Rifle Division (Belorussian Military District), which tested thirty Ob'yekt 765 IFVs and three experimental Ob'yekt 765s.

BMP-1s were first seen by the West during the 7 November 1967 military parade in Moscow. Its appearance created a stir in the West where lightly armed APCs were still the main means of transportation and infantry support on a battlefield.

In the Soviet Army, BMP-1s were typically issued to motorized rifle divisions and the motorized rifle regiments of tank divisions where they replaced the BTR-152 wheeled armored personnel carrier (APC), the BTR-50P and some BTR-60P APCs.

There was considerable debate among Soviet tank specialists about the utility of the BMP at the time: it had weak armor and a low-powered armament in comparison with main battle tanks (MBT)s and was far more expensive than wheeled APCs. The probability of nuclear warfare had decreased significantly at the beginning of the 1970s, new tactics for the use of IFVs during conventional warfare had to be developed. Those tactics had to take into consideration the large numbers of anti-tank weapons prevalent on modern battlefields. It was finally decided that a BMP-1 with soldiers inside could be used successfully during breakthrough operations or in the pursuit of retreating enemy forces.

BMP-1s were widely used in the Soviet–Afghan War. Besides the usual motorized rifle and tank units, they were also operated by some Soviet special forces units.

BMP-1s were unsuited to fighting in the mountainous regions of Afghanistan. They were originally designed to be used together with MBTs and infantry in rapid maneuvers during an assault across flat and forested European areas in nuclear conditions. In Afghanistan, the main enemies were not other AFVs, but land mines and ambushes prepared by the Mujahideen armed with light anti-tank weapons; the BMP-1's anti-tank firepower was not suitable.

A new up-armored variant of the BMP-1, designated the BMP-1D, (it was sometimes known as the "Afghan" variant), was urgently pressed into service in 1982. Many field modifications were carried out by various units. These included welding an additional AGS-17 "Plamya" automatic grenade launcher, without its mounting, on the bracket of the anti-tank guided missile (ATGM) launcher on the turret roof or a 2B9 "Vasilek" 82 mm automatic gun-mortar on the roof of the troop compartment to increase the vehicle's firepower when guarding vital routes. Crew members noted that the 73 mm OG-9 HE-Fragmentation round for the main gun, which was supposed to increase the vehicle's firepower against unarmored vehicles and infantry, had a large dispersion, insufficient point-blank range and an occasional inability to penetrate cob walls due to its low muzzle velocity. The PG-9 HEAT round was able to penetrate Afghan pise buildings, but because of the poor fragmentation effect of an anti-tank projectile a small hole was often the only result. Based on the experience of Afghanistan, a BMP-1PG (Ob'yekt 765Sp8) was fitted with an additional AGS-17 grenade launcher on the left hand side of the turret roof. It was developed by the Kurgan Engineering Works. A few BMP-1s were used in Afghanistan as support for airborne forces and were equipped with RPG-16 airborne shoulder-launched anti-tank rocket-propelled grenades, (RPG)s, taken from the BMD-1 IFV.

Many BMP-1s and BMP-1Ps fell victim to Mujahideen attacks and anti-tank landmines (see Protection Issues section for more details); a fate shared by many Soviet light AFVs. A number were also captured by the Mujahideen. The Soviet Army lost 1317 APCs and IFVs of all types during 9 years of war in Afghanistan.

=== Russia ===
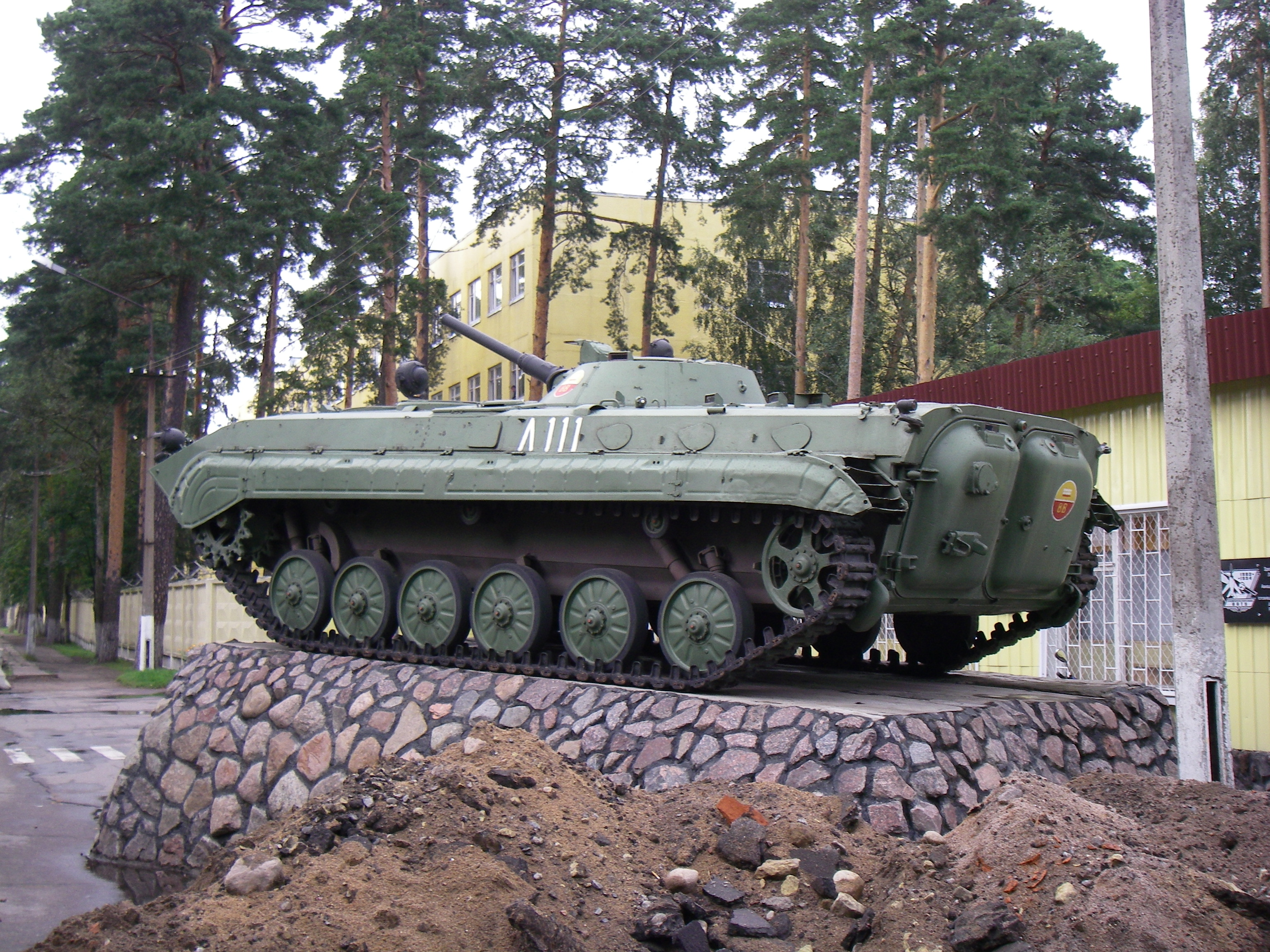
The monument to BMP-1 crews lost in battles in Afghanistan and Chechnya, at the 33rd brigade, internal security troops, located in Lebyazhye settlement (Leningrad Oblast), 29 July 2007.

BMP-1s and vehicles based on it are used by the following units of the Russian Army or are stationed at some of the following locations:

Leningrad Military District

The 232nd reserve base at Chernaya Rechka (35 BMP-1s)
The 268th artillery brigade from Pushkin (Saint Petersburg) (5 PRP-4s)
The 380th MLRS regiment from Pushkin (Saint Petersburg) (1 PRP-4)

Moscow Military District

The 4th guards Kantemirovskaya tank division

The 12th tank regiment at Naro-Fominsk (44 BMP-1s and 4 BRM-1Ks)
The 13th tank regiment at Naro-Fominsk (5 BRM-1Ks and 6 BMP-1KShs)
The 14th tank regiment at Naro-Fominsk (44 BMP-1s, 3 BRM-1Ks and 1 BMP-1KShM "Potok-2")
The 423rd motorized regiment at Naro-Fominsk (5 BRM-1Ks and 8 BMP-1KShs)
The 137th independent intelligence battalion at Naro-Fominsk (21 BMPs)

The 10th guards Uralsko-Lvovskaya tank division

The 61st tank regiment from Boguchar (Voronezh) (41 BMP-1s, 5 BRM-1Ks and 5 BMP-1KShMs "Potok-2")
The 62nd tank regiment from Boguchar (Voronezh) (5 BMP-1s, 2 BRM-1Ks and 2 BMP-1KShs)
The 112th independent intelligence battalion from Boguchar (Voronezh) (11 BRM-1Ks)

Volga-Ural Military District

The 81st guards motor rifle regiment from Samara (126 BMP-1s)
The 5967th storage from Markovo (Perm') (127 BMP-1s, 27 BRM-1Ks and 25 BMP-1KShMs "Potok-2")

The 163rd tank repair plant at Kuschevskaya (Krasnodar) (65 BMP-1s and 21 BREM-Chs)

North Caucasus Military District

The 90th motorized regiment from the 12th military base at Khelvachauri, Georgia (44 BMP-1s)
The 409th motorized regiment from the 62nd military base at Akhalkalaki, Georgia (21 BMP-1s)
The 123rd motorized regiment from the 102nd military base at Erevan, Armenia (23 BMP-1s)
Storage base at 102nd military base at Gyumri, Armenia (47 BMP-1s)

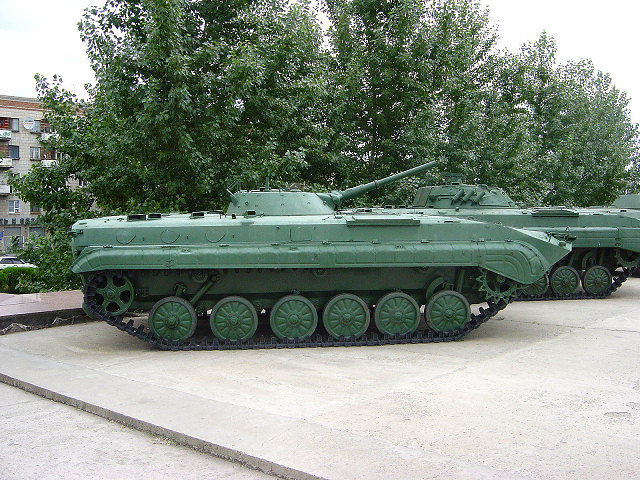
A BMP-1 at the "Battle of Stalingrad" museum-panorama in Volgograd, 18 July 2005.

Besides the Russian Army, BMP-1s are also in service with the internal security troops of the Ministry of Internal Affairs (MVD). These vehicles were used during counter-terrorism and patrol operations in Chechnya. The following units use the BMP-1, (not a complete list):

North-West District of the MVD

The 33rd independent brigade from Lebyazhye and Lomonosov, (34 BMPs)

Moscow District of the MVD

The 1st independent division from Balashikha, (46 BMP-1s)
The 21st brigade from Sofrino, (36 BMPs)

North Caucasus District of the MVD

The 2nd special purpose division from Krasnodar-451, (34 BMPs)
The 99th special purpose division from Rostov-on-Don and Persyanovka, (33 BMPs)
The 100th special purpose division from Novocherkassk, (103 BMPs)
The 8th special purpose brigade from Nalchik, (33 BMPs),
The 22nd special purpose brigade from Kalach, (27 BMPs),
The 22nd special purpose brigade from Kalach-na-Donu, (27 BMPs)
The 49th special purpose brigade from Vladikavkaz, (12 BMPs)
Special purpose Brigades

Labinsk, (34 BMPs)
Zelenokumsk, (34 BMPs)
Mozdok, (34 BMPs)

Volga District of the MVD

The 54th division from Gaiva, Perm,(15 BMPs)
The 34th independent brigade from Shumilovo, Bogorodsk,(30 BMPs)
Saratov Military Institute of the MVD,(4 BMPs)

With the reduction of the former Soviet Army, many of the older vehicles, including BMP-1s, are surplus to requirements. A number of BMP-1s are being converted into civilian tracked vehicles, (to be used for emergency transport, forest fire fighting and logging), for the far northern regions of the country. Some written-off and demilitarized BMP-1s are being given to different military history museums like the "Battle of Stalingrad" museum-panorama in Volgograd or converted into town monuments, a number of obsolete vehicles have been scrapped. Repaired and modernized BMP-1s and 2s are the mainstay of the Russian Army and the internal security troops of the Ministry of Home Affairs of the Russian Federation. It is planned to replace them with BMP-3s and BMP-3Ms.

==== Chechen wars ====
The 81st Guards motor rifle regiment, originally stationed in East Germany, was relocated along with other units of the 90th Guard Red Banner Lvov tank division in 1993. The regiment, armed with 31 MBTs and 96 IFVs, later took part in the First Chechen war. During the assault on Grozny on 31 December 1994, the 1st motor rifle battalion and the 131st Maykop motor rifle brigade successfully captured a central train station while the 2nd motor rifle battalion of the regiment blocked the presidential palace. The commanders of both battalions organized outpost and reconnaissance after columns were trapped in the streets, suffering an estimated 150 casualties from snipers and RPGs. The commander and the executive officer of the regiment were badly wounded in the fighting. The regiment placed its block posts under the control of internal security troops and was put into reserve at Severny airport in February 1994 to perform guard duties at Chervlennaya and Chervlennaya-Uzlovaya railway stations. The regiment was withdrawn from Chechnya in April 1995.

=== Foreign service ===
The BMP-1 was exported to many countries and is still in service with about 48 armies. Many countries that can not afford to buy modern IFVs operate the BMP-1 due to its still acceptable maneuverability, reliability, low maintenance costs and because of it being easy to operate and modernize. It was in service with all the members of the Warsaw Pact. Numbers varied greatly, some East German divisions had the BMP-1 in all three motor rifle regiments while the Romanians and Bulgarians had no BMP-series vehicles.

==== Poland ====
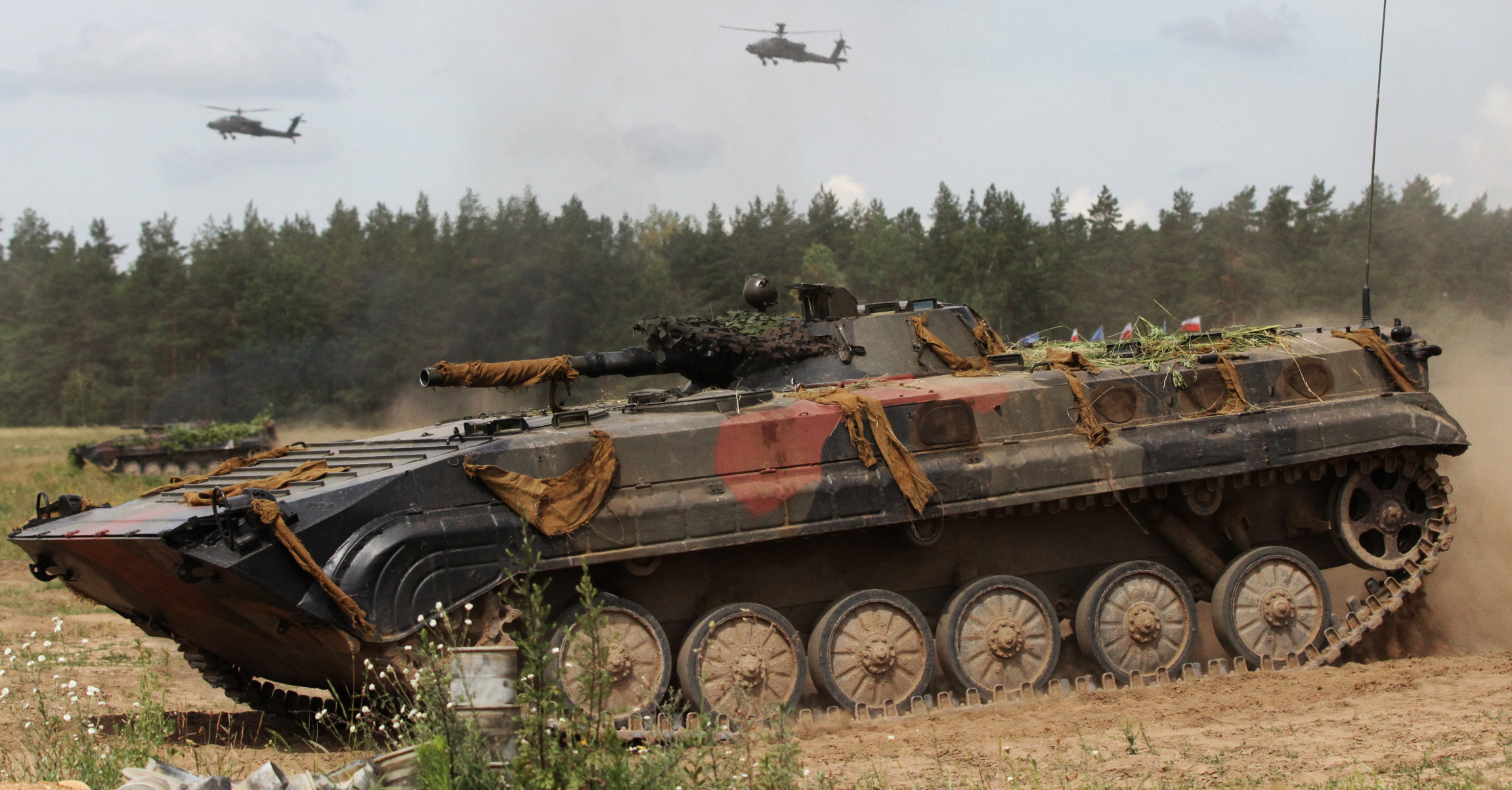
Polish BWP-1 during cooperative training exercise Saber Strike 18.

Poland bought 1,409 BWP-1s (BWP-1 is the Polish designation for two Soviet BMP-1 models – Ob'yekt 765Sp2 and Ob'yekt 765Sp3), from the Soviet Union in 1969. The first BWP-1s began to arrive in Poland in 1972 and continued until 1979. The first vehicles entered service with the Ludowe Wojsko Polskie in 1973. It still plays the role of a basic infantry fighting vehicle. BWP is an acronym for the Polish name for an IFV and stands for Bojowy Wóz Piechoty (which literally translates as Fighting Vehicle of Infantry). As such it is used by many units of the Polish Army, including the 4th armored cavalry brigade (SBKPanc) from Orzysz and the 7th Coastal Defense Brigade from Słupsk. BWP-1s are also used by the Polish peacekeeping unit in KFOR.

Poland also bought 22 BWR-1D (BRM-1K) reconnaissance vehicles in 1987 from the USSR and 16 BWR-1S, (a modernized BPzV), reconnaissance vehicles from the Czech Republic in the early 1990s. BWR-1S reconnaissance vehicles are used by the 18th Reconnaissance Battalion of the 16th Mechanized Division in Elbląg and the 2nd Reconnaissance Regiment from Hrubieszów. Poland also operates MP-31 command vehicles which served as a basis for the ZWDSz 2 command vehicle (see the 'Poland' section, of the BMP-1 variants article for details). There are 1,306 BWP-1s, 33 BWP-1Ds, 5 MP-31s and 6 ZWDSz-2 command vehicles in service as of the first half of 2008. The number of BWR-1Ss and BWR-Ds has not changed. WPT/DTP "Mors" armored recovery vehicles (ARVs), based on the Opal tracked, amphibious multi-purpose APC are used to recover damaged BWP-1s as well as other tracked vehicles weighing less than 14 tonnes. WZT-2 (ARV)s are also used for this task.

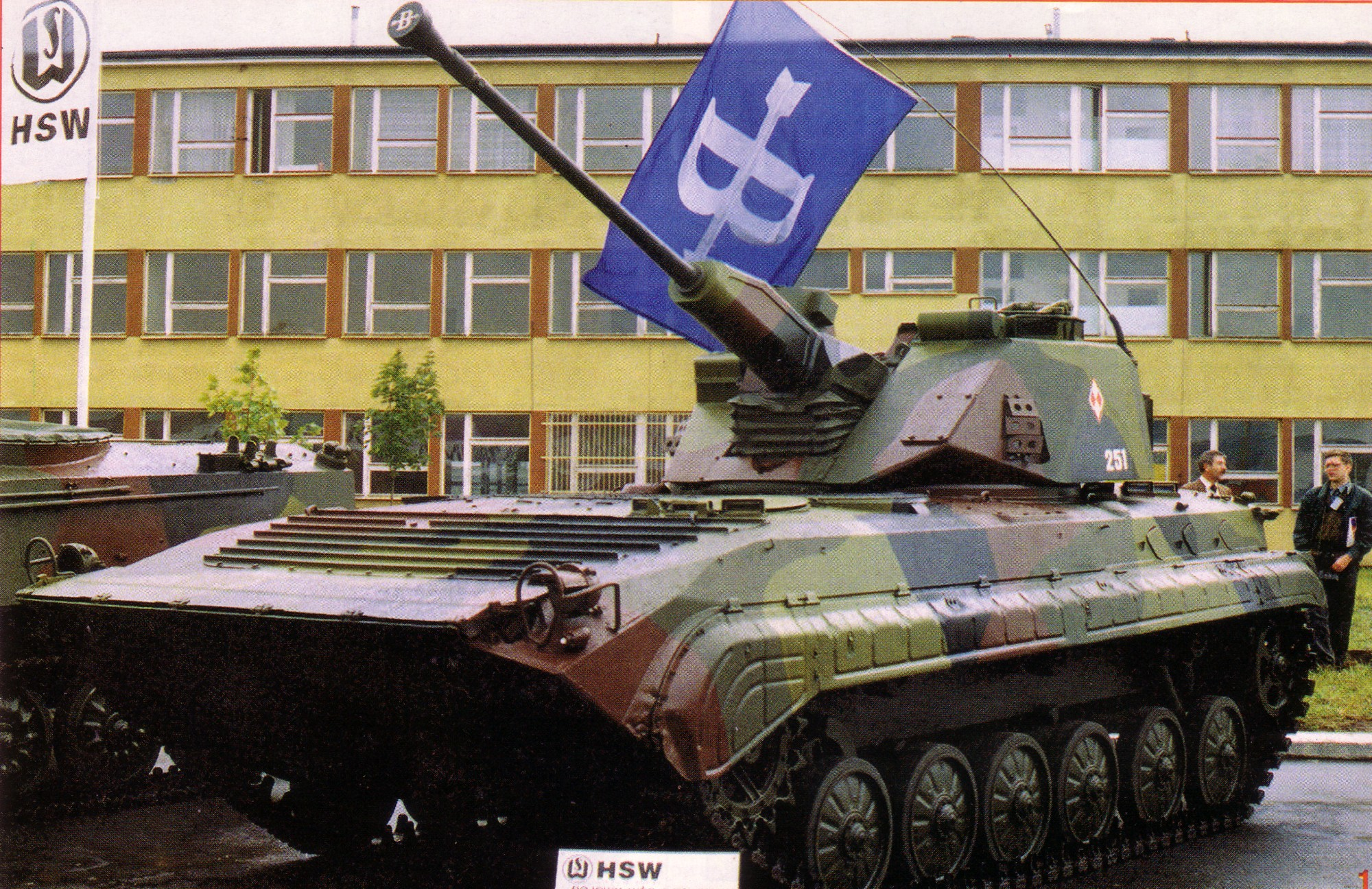
The BWP-40 prototype on a MSPO 93 in Kielce.

Polish military specialists consider the BWP-1 to be obsolete. Before the political changes of 1989, the Polish Army planned to replace its BWP-1s with BWP-2s but financial problems resulted in just 62 vehicles being purchased. Obtaining sufficient numbers became impossible, Poland was forced to abandon the plan. The vehicles that had been bought were sold in 1995 to Angola. The Polish Army is planning to upgrade a number of its BWP-1s to BWP-1M "Puma" standard, which is a modernization developed in 1999 by the Wojskowe Zakłady Motoryzacyjne Nr. 5 (WZM Nr. 5) (Military Motorization Plant No. 5) in Poznań. A new unmanned turret was chosen. An experimental company equipped with BWP-1M "Puma" IFVs is to be created in 2011. Four mechanized battalions are to be reequipped from 2012.

BWP-1s are fitted with passive night vision devices and modern communication equipment while undergoing maintenance. The two main candidates for replacing the BWP-1 are: the Swedish CV 90 and the Polish BWP-2000. The BWP-2000 was developed using the chassis of the SUM Kalina minelayer and based on experiences with the BWP-1 in the 1990s by the OBRUM (Ośrodek Badawczo-Rozwojowy Urządzeń Mechnicznych – Institute of Research and Development of Mechanical Devices), from Gliwice, with help from Polish experts on IFVs.

There have been a few other Polish BWP-1 modernizations such as fitting a new small-caliber autocannon, modern day/night vision devices and reactive armor which did not progress through the prototype stage. Others include an experimental fitting of a French Dragar turret and a non-amphibious BWP-40, the Swedish CV 9040 turret mounted on a BWP-1 hull, a joint development of Huta Stalowa Wola and Bofors and the BWP-95 (see the Poland section of the BMP-1 variants article for details). The aim of such modernization is to increase the firepower of the BWP-1 in accordance with the modern standards of the Polish Army and NATO. The preservation of all available army infrastructure (AFV repair bases, training schools) is also important. The main problem with modernized variants of the BWP-1 is a significant increase in the weight of the vehicle which can cause an overload of the engine, the transmission and the suspension.

==== Yom Kippur War ====
The BMP-1 was tested in combat for the first time on 8 October 1973, during the Yom Kippur War. Egypt had received its first batch of 80 brand new IFVs in July and August 1973. A second batch of 150 vehicles was delivered between August and September. The Egyptian army used BMP-1s in mechanized infantry battalions of tank and mechanized infantry divisions (32–40 BMP-1s per battalion). Syria had received between 150 and 170 BMP-1s by the start of the war, of which about 100 were committed to the front line and used by mechanized infantry battalions during the conflict (the rest were used by president Hafez al-Assad's guard). The Syrians used their BMP-1s on 8 October 1973 on the Golan Heights where they consolidated gains as around 600 Syrian tanks dented the Israeli defenses at Quneitra. But it was an inauspicious debut for the BMP-1 – many vehicles were lost due to technical failure and the inexperience of the Syrian crews. Insufficiently trained Syrian mechanized infantry could not fire accurately from inside the IFVs, so the vehicles were used in the same manner as conventional APCs, i.e. to transport soldiers towards Israeli trench lines where they could dismount. The Syrians were not satisfied with their BMP-1s – they praised it for its speed and maneuverability but found the 2A28 "Grom" gun effective against enemy tanks only at ranges of less than 500 m. The 9M14M "Malyutka" ATGM was hard to aim from inside the vehicle while on the move. After the war the Syrians came to the conclusion that: "The BMP was like a Mercedes but what we needed was just a simple Ford".

The low profile of the vehicle made it hard or even impossible to support the dismounted advancing infantry. Based on this, new tactics for BMP-1 usage were created after the war and used by the Soviets during subsequent military maneuvers. They included 50 meter long intervals between the advancing infantry squads to allow IFVs to support the infantry with their firepower. On the positive side, the vehicle was praised for being fast and agile. Its low ground pressure enabled it to navigate the northern Kantara salt marshes where Israeli and Egyptian tanks would have bogged down. These advantages amazed the Israeli military. Its ability to swim proved useful when it was used by the Egyptians in the first wave of Suez Canal crossings. Egyptian crewmen of the 4th armored division who used BMP-1s for the fire support of the 2nd and 18th infantry divisions at Kantara valued the BMP-1 for its high speed and maneuverability but noted its bad ventilation, (Egyptian crewmembers and infantry suffered a lot from the heat and to compensate for this drawback, kept some of the vehicle's hatches open, even in combat zones). The Egyptians also found the troop compartment too cramped for eight fully equipped soldiers to quickly mount/dismount the vehicle. Consequently, Egyptian BMP-1s usually only took six.

Israeli tank brigades suffered very high losses during the Syrian offensive. The Israelis noted that the "Malyutka" ATGMs, (including those launched from BMP-1s), were deadly against their tanks (the Sho't, the M48A3 Patton and the M60A1). The Israelis were able to destroy or capture 40–60 Egyptian BMP-1s and 50–60 Syrian BMP-1s out of a total of more than 200 destroyed or captured Arab APCs and IFVs. Around half of the Syrian IFVs that were abandoned by their crews suffered minor mechanical breakdowns. The inability of inexperienced crews (who received the BMP-1 just before the beginning of the war), to carry out maintenance on the new vehicle, was also a factor. During the Yom Kippur War the armor of the BMP-1 proved vulnerable to 106 mm light recoilless guns. In the fighting at Vadi Mabuk, south channel sector, on 13 October, Israeli soldiers found the rear armor of the BMP's turret vulnerable to the armor-piercing bullets of the .50 caliber heavy machine gun. One of the first BMP-1s to be captured was transported to Ben-Gurion airport for detailed investigation by Israeli and American specialists.

The number of BMP-1s used by the Arab forces was too small to influence the Yom Kippur War, but the innovation they brought to tactics drew the attention of many of the world's military specialists to the new type of AFV. Nevertheless, the Yom Kippur War did not confirm that the tactics of the IFVs were viable.

Several Soviet technical teams from the General Armoured Directorate (GBTU) were sent to Syria in the wake of the war to gather information about the use of the new vehicle (at the same time US specialists were gathering the same information). These lessons, combined with observations of western military tactics, development and the use of light AFVs in a number of other military conflicts, resulted in the beginning of a modernization program for the BMP-1 in 1974. A few updates were introduced in the Ob'yect 765Sp3 model to increase its firepower against small unarmored targets (infantry, soft-skinned vehicles, etc.) but the conclusions about the vehicle's vulnerability to infantry anti-tank weapons were not taken into consideration until the Soviet–Afghan War.

==== Angola ====
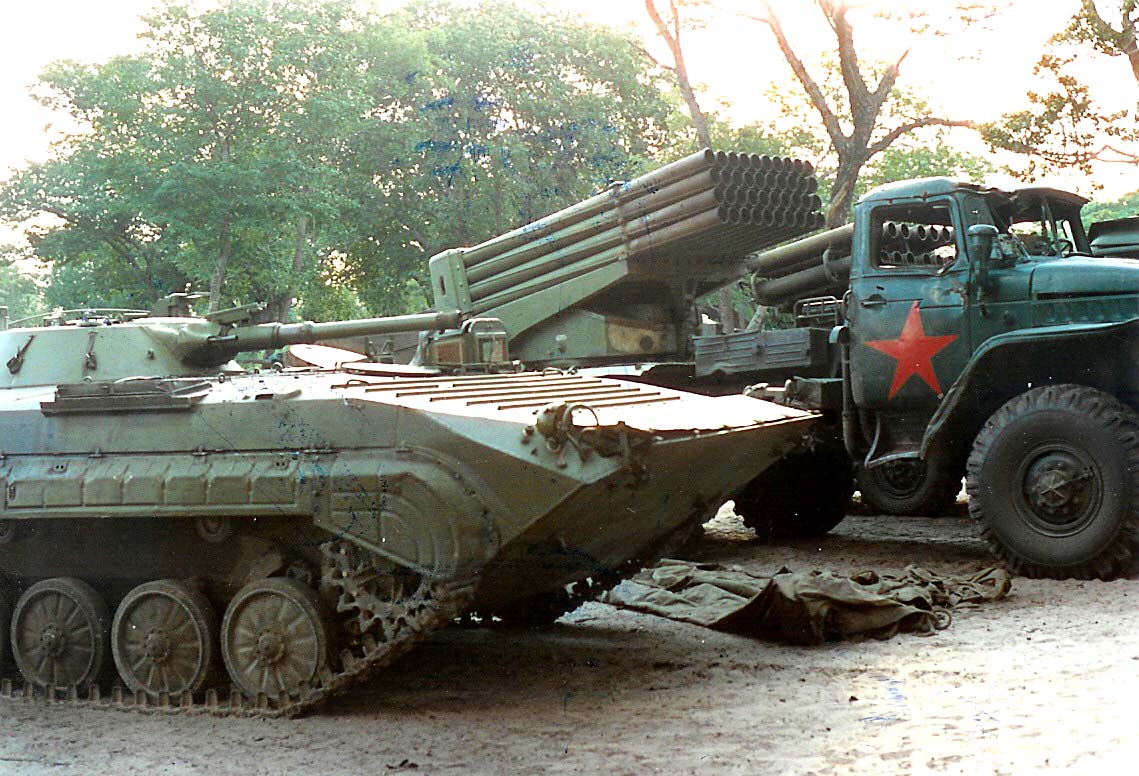
FAPLA BMP-1 and BM-21 rocket artillery captured by UNITA.

The BMP-1 was extensively deployed by the People's Armed Forces of Liberation of Angola (FAPLA) and its Cuban allies during the Angolan Civil War and South African Border War. The first Cuban mechanized and motorized infantry forces to be deployed to Angola were sent first to the People's Republic of the Congo in November 1975, where they were equipped with BMP-1s and other heavy weapons furbished by the Soviet government for the FAPLA war effort. They then crossed the border by road into Cabinda Province, subsequently joining a FAPLA campaign against the Front for the Liberation of the Enclave of Cabinda (FLEC). The Cuban BMPs were used for counter-insurgency patrols after the conventional battles in Cabinda ended.

Until the late 1980s, FAPLA lacked a significant mechanized infantry capability and was dependent largely on wheeled APCs such as the BTR-60PB and obsolete BTR-152. The BMP-1 was more commonly utilised as a command vehicle in the FAPLA armored brigades. Some BMP-1s were allocated to the Soviet military mission in Angola for liaison and general transport. Others participated in convoy escort missions, often accompanied by motorized infantry in BTR-60s. FAPLA logistics convoys were typically led by a bulldozer or tank modified with mine clearance equipment, followed closely by at least one BTR and a BMP-1. The purpose of the BMP in the convoy was to engage hostile armour with its cannon and anti-tank guided missiles. While the BTR-mounted infantry squad was capable of repelling attacks by lightly armed insurgents, towards the end of the 1980s more convoys were ambushed by South African expeditionary troops in their own armoured fighting vehicles. The BMP was likely adopted in direct response to the increasing threat posed to the convoys by South African armour.

FAPLA deployed BMP-1s in small numbers during an ill-fated 1987 offensive against the National Union for the Total Independence of Angola (UNITA) and its South African allies, which initiated the Battle of Cuito Cuanavale. During Operation Moduler, South African troops captured 2 FAPLA BMP-1s in intact condition and destroyed a third. Cuba later deployed a number of its own BMP-1s to southern Angola during a 1988 offensive against South African positions near the border. In 1989, FAPLA renewed its offensive against UNITA during Operation Final Assault, deploying BMP-mounted mechanized infantry for the first time in large numbers. The offensive was abandoned after the units involved suffered heavy casualties; UNITA claimed to have destroyed or captured 200 FAPLA BMP-1s. In 1993, FAPLA ordered almost 300 new BMP-1s from Belarus, Bulgaria, and Russia to replace those lost in the civil war. By 1999, UNITA had captured enough BMP-1s and BMP-2s to integrate them into a single mechanized unit of battalion strength. However, UNITA lacked the resources to keep the vehicles well maintained, and suffered from an erratic supply of diesel fuel which made prolonged mechanized operations unsustainable. UNITA's mechanized capability was destroyed after several pitched battles with the superior FAPLA forces in late 1999.

==== People's Republic of China ====
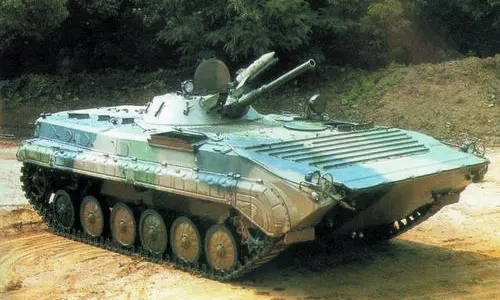
A Chinese WZ 501 (Type 86) IFV.

The People's Republic of China bought a single BMP-1 (Ob'yekt 765Sp3) IFV from Egypt in 1975. Soviet-Chinese diplomatic relations were at the time, confrontational, and the Chinese could not ask for a Soviet BMP-1. By reverse-engineering, the Chinese developed an almost full copy of a Soviet BMP-1 in 1986. The Chinese model WZ 501 was 200 kg lighter and with a copied 310–320 hp NORINCO 6V150 diesel engine, (a copy of the original UTD-20), it had the same maximum road speed as the BMP-1. The WZ 501 was originally intended for the export market, but the People's Liberation Army (PLA), which only used APCs, was desperate for a dedicated IFV. The PLA adopted a number of WZ 501s in 1992, giving the WZ 501 the designation 'Type 86', even though the vehicle, like the original BMP-1, was already obsolete.

In spite of its characteristic drawbacks, (weak armour, low efficiency of the 73 mm gun), the Chinese developed the Type 86 in the mid-1990s. A modernized variant, designated the Type 86A (WZ 501B), was fitted with a 400 hp engine, a modern radio and 2nd generation infrared vision devices. Type 86A IFVs will remain in service with the PLA for the foreseeable future. The PLA maintains around 1,000 of those IFVs, (the earlier WZ 501s were upgraded to WZ 501B level), which are mostly used by armoured units stationed in northern mainland China. The modernization of WZ 501 IFVs developed by the Chinese NORINCO concern are known, including the WZ 501M with a new one-man turret armed with the Russian 2A72 30 mm autocannon and the "Malyutka-2" ATGM. The PLA Marine Corps in southern Guangdong province, is equipped with the special variant designated the Type 86B developed by NORINCO which has been adapted for crossing sea water obstacles.

A co-operation project between the Chinese NORINCO and the US FMC companies in the 1980s gave birth to a prototype export variant designated the NFV-1. The prototype of the NFV-1 IFV was shown publicly in November 1986. The vehicle has the "Sharpshooter" one-man turret armed with the stabilized 25 mm M242 Bushmaster autocannon and 7.62 mm M240 coaxial general-purpose machine gun fitted onto a Type 86 hull. Further development ceased when the US government prohibited any further collaboration with the Chinese as a response to the Tiananmen Square crackdown. At the end of the 1980s, the Chinese, with the help of the US FMC company, designed the Type 86-I (WZ 501A) IFV with a new overhead mount turret (the same as mounted on WZ 551 wheeled IFVs), armed with a licensed Chinese copy of a 25 mm M242 Bushmaster autocannon and a 7.62 mm Type 86 coaxial machine gun (a Chinese copy of the 7.62 mm PKT tank machine gun). It was reported that 350 WZ 501A IFVs were produced for the PLA.

The Chinese developed a family of armored fighting vehicles based on the WZ 501 IFV which includes a nuclear, biological and chemical (NBC) reconnaissance vehicle; a battlefield surveillance vehicle; a WZ 502 mortar carrier; a WZ 503 turretless prototype APC with a larger troop compartment and 12.7 mm heavy machine gun; a WZ 504 tank destroyer (about 180 were built), fitted with an elevatable weapon station armed with two or four HJ-73 "Red Arrow 73" cable-guided ATGM rail launchers (the HJ-73 ATGM is a licensed copy of the Soviet 9M14M "Malyutka-M" ATGM); a WZ 505 armored ambulance and a WZ 506 command and staff vehicle (about 90 were built). (See 'The People's Republic of China' section in the BMP-1 variants article for details). The WZ 501 has also been exported to Iran, Iraq, North Korea, Burma and Sri Lanka.

==== Cuba ====
Due to there being a limited number of BMP-1s in Cuban service only one company per a motor rifle regiment could be equipped with BMP-1s instead of BTR-60 APCs.

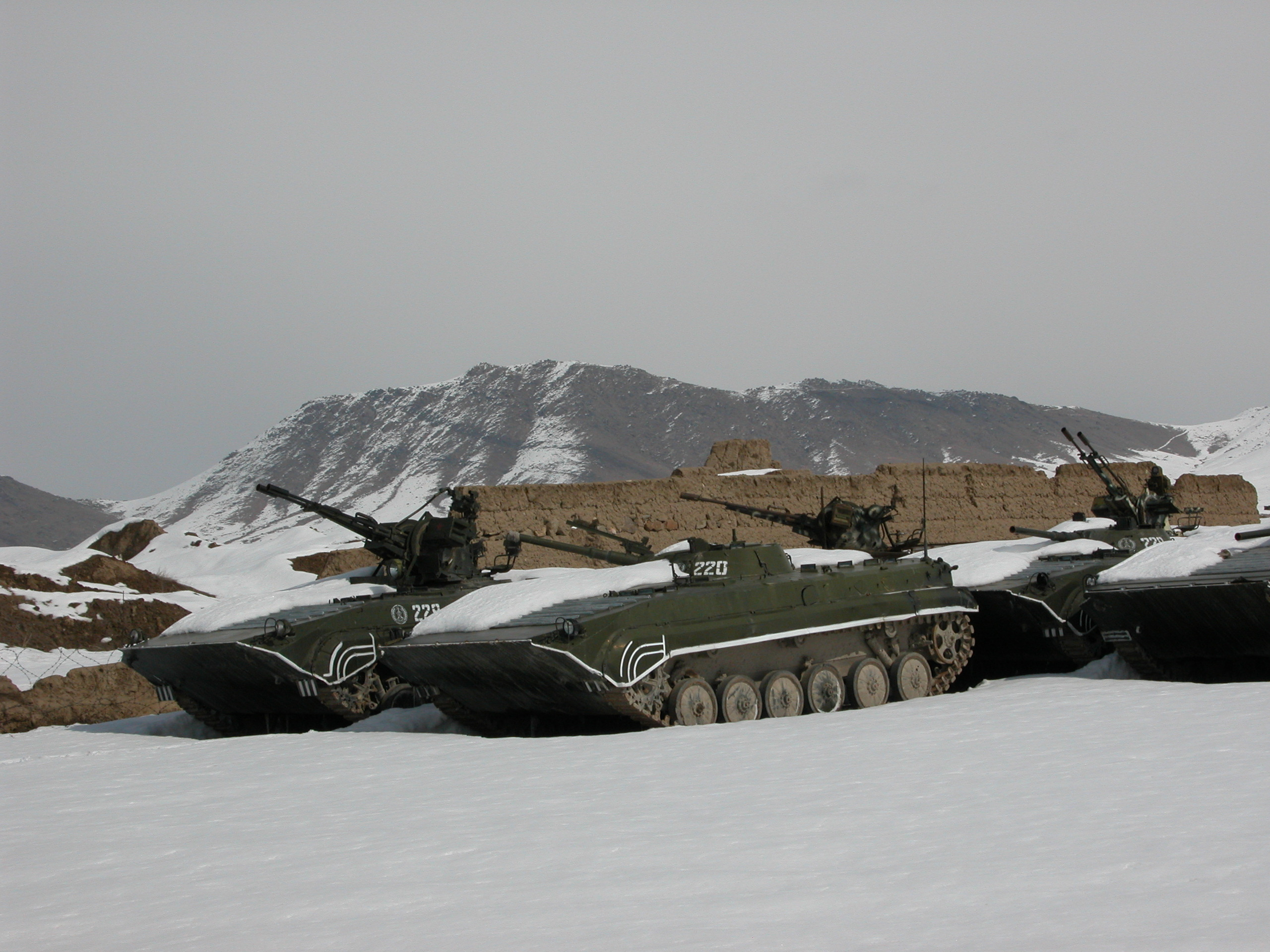
Three Afghan BMP-1 IFVs and three BMP-1 based SPAAGs, 2005.

==== Afghanistan ====
During the war in Afghanistan a number of Soviet BMP-1s fell into the hands of the Mujahideen who used them against their former owners. Some were converted by the Afghans into self-propelled anti-aircraft guns (SPAAG)s/fire support vehicles armed with ZU-23-2 twin autocannon. They were used for fire support in the mountains. Many BMP-1s were left behind by the withdrawing Soviet forces. These vehicles and some derelicts were restored to working condition and are now used by the Afghan National Army. The Afghan army also operates the previously mentioned SPAAGs.

==== India ====
India produced a licensed copy of the Soviet BMP-1. The Indian version differs from the basic model, having a slightly altered turret design.

Indian BMP-1s participated in a difficult operation against Tamil rebels in Sri Lanka in October 1987 (Operation Pawan), when transport planes flew some 2,200 sorties, delivering T-72 MBTs, BMP-1s and other equipment for Indian units which were not equipped with heavy weapons initially. This had been the plan in order to minimize civilian losses and damage done in Jaffna. In some areas anti-personnel mines were countered by driving BMP-1s and T-72 MBTs over them. AFVs were used as support during attacks on enemy positions. Elsewhere, a BMP-1 of the 72nd infantry brigade with colonel D.S. Saraon and nine soldiers aboard hit a mine which resulted in their deaths.

The Indian Army had more than 600 BMP-1 and BMP-2s in 1994. The BMP-1s were eventually withdrawn from service and replaced by BMP-2s.

==== Iraq ====
Prior to the first Gulf War, Iraq bought around 1,000 BMP-1s and 800 BMP-2s. The first vehicles were bought by Iraq from the USSR in the 1970s. Iraq also developed two upgrades for the BMP-1 and one armored ambulance conversion. The first upgrade, designated the Saddam I, was shown during the 1989 Baghdad exhibition. It added appliqué armour to the sides of the hull and looked quite similar to the Soviet BMP-1D. The Saddam I never entered production because the additional armor overloaded the chassis and a suitable replacement engine to handle this extra weight was not available. The second upgrade, designated the Saddam II, added rubber side-skirts, additional armor on the upper hull sides and an ATU box. Unlike the first upgrade, it did enter production and was mainly used by the Iraqi Republican Guard. In 1985 Iraq also developed an armored ambulance conversion (named in some sources as the BMP-1SM) which had the turret removed and the rear part of the vehicle extended to allow the easier transportation of stretchers and walking wounded. The vehicle did not enter service in large numbers.

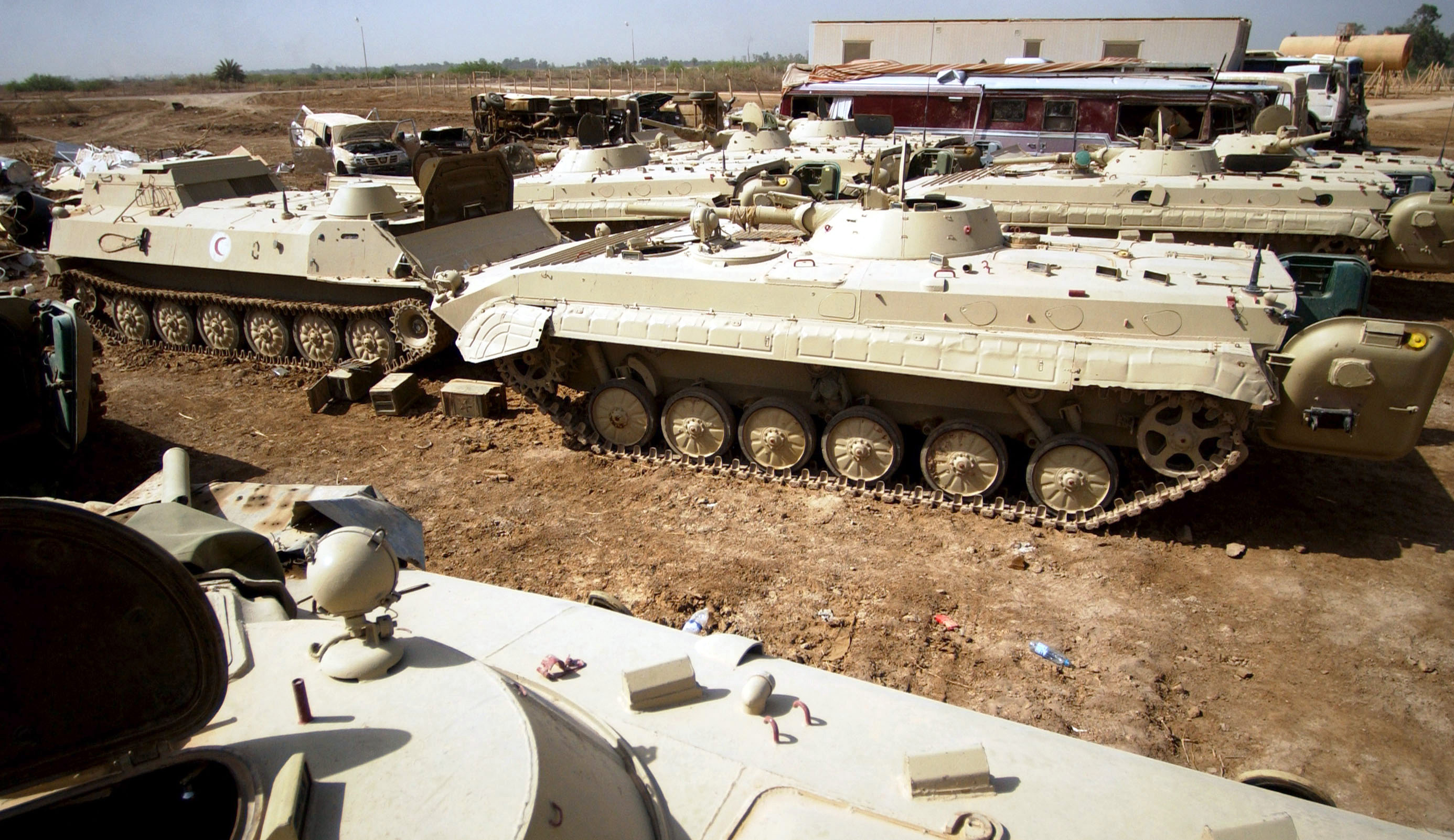
Seven Iraqi BMP-1s and a MT-LB-based armored ambulance captured during Operation Iraq Freedom at Baghdad International Airport (BIAP), 7 May 2003.

Iraqi BMP-1s and BMP-2s faced the US-led forces in 1991, which included 2,200 M2 Bradleys and M3 AFVs. During the battle of Medina Ridge, an M2A2 Bradley commanded by Sergeant Charles Peters, took part in a 60-second firefight with Iraqi Republican Guard AFVs during which the US vehicle destroyed two BMPs, firing about nine armor-piercing rounds from the Bradley's 25 mm autocannon (three of which destroyed the first BMP). A T-72M MBT was also destroyed by a TOW ATGM.

On the third day of fighting on land (26 February 1991,) the American VII corps engaged the Iraqi 2nd and 3rd Republican Guard divisions, the 12th Mechanized Division and the 12tharmored division in northwest Kuwait at around 1620hrs. It resulted in the destruction of 13 Iraqi T-72 MBTs and 13 Iraqi BMPs. On the same day and in the same area at around 1830hrs a group of M1 Abrams MBTs destroyed nine T-72 s and four BMPs.

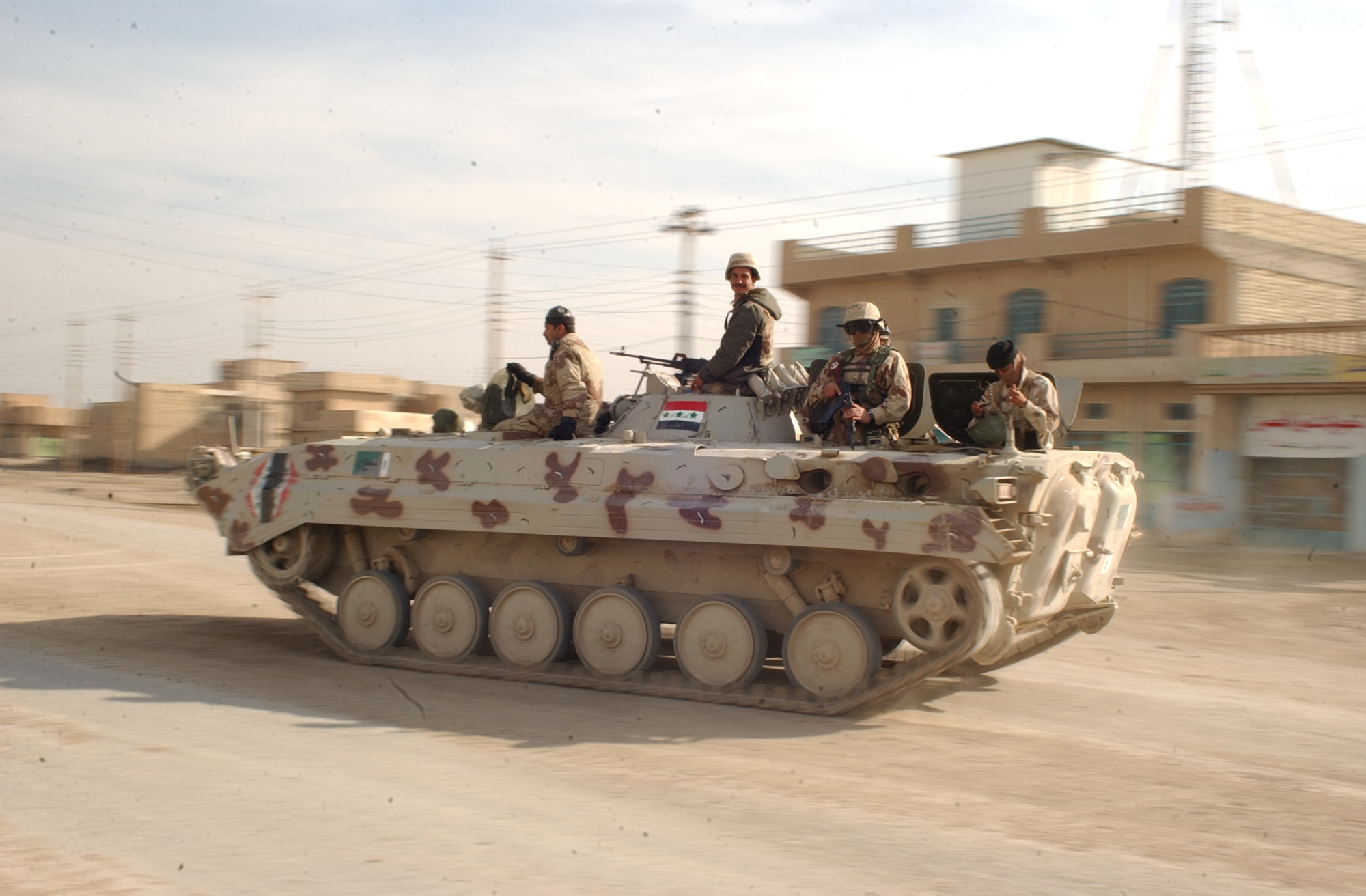
New Iraqi Army BMP-1 on the move.

During the Battle of 73 Easting an Iraqi BMP-1 knocked out a US M2 Bradley (codenamed G-16) with two 73 millimeter rounds. The first round hit the front armor of the turret but failed to penetrate it. The second hit beneath the TOW ATGM launcher, penetrating the armor, disabling the vehicle, killing the gunner and wounding the loader and commander.

The last battle of the conflict in which Iraqi BMPs were used took place on 2 March 1991, when part of the Iraqi "Hammurabi" Republican Guard division tried to break out of the pocket which had been closed by the US 24th armored division. When the Iraqis opened fire on the Bradleys, the Americans called in AH-64 Apache attack helicopters. They destroyed 32 T-72 MBTs, 49 BMPs, 2 ZSU-23-4 SPAAGs and 48 other vehicles. It is unknown how many Iraqi BMPs survived the First Persian Gulf War, but the ones that did were used during the 2003 invasion of Iraq – with similar results.

After the war the newly formed New Iraqi Army operates BMP-1s. They are used by the 1st Mechanized Brigade which is based in Taji. It also assumed part of the security mission of the Ministry of Defense by stationing BMP-1s in the MOD grounds. The New Iraqi Army operates a total of 434 BMP-1s including 100 (36 in 2005 and 64 in 2006) BMP-1A1 'Ost' from Greece.

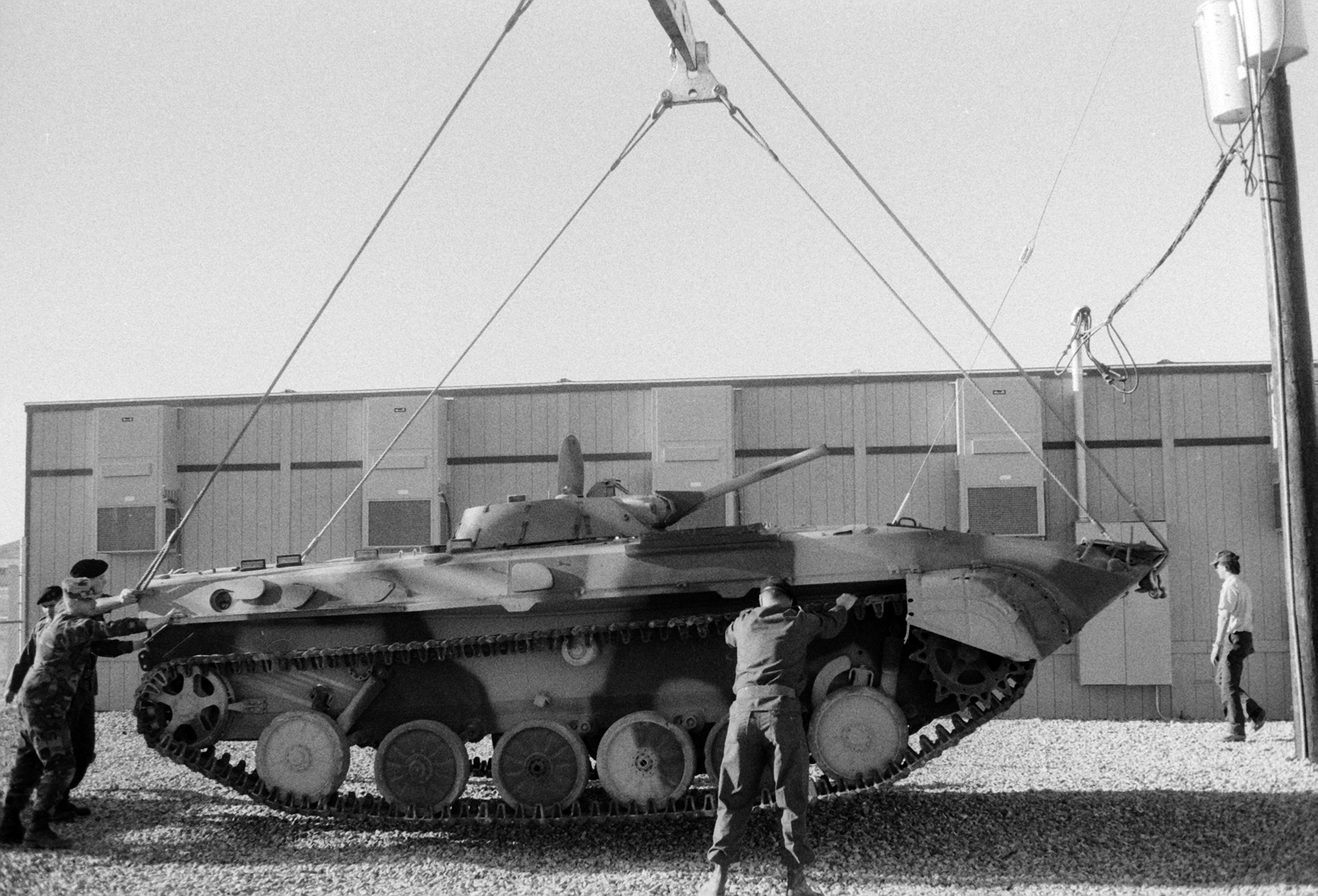
A BMP-1 used in the OPFOR role at the US 177th Armored Brigade motor pool in Fort Irwin, 9 February 1987.

==== United States ====
The United States Army received several BMP-1s for evaluation purposes. The first examples were four BMP-1s captured by Israel. In 1987, 36 intact BMP-1s were received from Chad for technical evaluation, after having been captured from Libyan forces. Other damaged BMP-1s are believed to have been received from Morocco. A new batch of 19 BMP-1s was received from Germany in 1991 and three additional ones in 1993. US forces also captured a number of BMP-1s from Iraq during the First Persian Gulf War and 2003 invasion of Iraq. The vehicles were tested on proving grounds and three were then given to museums, including one in the US National Infantry Museum, Fort Benning. It was captured by the 24th Mechanized Infantry Division in the Euphrates valley during the First Persian Gulf War. The 177th Armored Brigade use a few captured BMP-1s in the opposing forces (OPFOR) role during exercises at the National Training Center in Fort Irwin, California.

==== Germany ====
The East German National People's Army operated one of the greatest arsenals of Soviet-built BMP-1s among the armies of the Warsaw Pact. On 3 October 1990, when German reunification took place, 1,112 functional BMP-1s became the property of the Federal Republic of Germany's Bundeswehr. The original plan was to retain them, until the German-built Marder 2 or the modernized Marder 1 became available in adequate numbers. They were brought up to NATO safety standards, modernized (fitted with a new radio, rear-view mirrors and reflectors) and received the designation BMP-1A1 Ost (See the 'Germany' section in the BMP-1 variants article for details). The majority of vehicles brought up to BMP-1A1 Ost standard were 'P' versions. 501 BMP-1A1s were sold to Greece between 1993 and 1994. 350 were sold to Sweden where they received the designation Pbv 501. 110 non-modernized BMP-1/BMP-1P were sold for a very low price to Finland in 1990.

==== Greece ====
The first vehicles to be adopted by the Hellenic Army were 501 BMP-1A1 Ost IFVs, bought from Germany between 1993 and 1994. These vehicles were slightly upgraded to Hellenic Army standards, a number were fitted with an M2 Browning .50 caliber heavy machine gun and the gunner's hatch was modified. In 2006 there were 377 BMP-1A1 Ost IFVs in service with the Hellenic Army. Greece was very interested in a Russian or Ukrainian modernization program for its BMP-1 fleet, as it would have cost around three times less than replacing the BMP-1s with an adequate number of Russian BMP-3s or German Marder 1A3s. It was decided in 2007 to replace the BMP-1 with more modern IFVs (see above), and to sell the remaining vehicles to other countries. Greece has already sold 100 BMP-1s to the New Iraqi Army, (36 in 2005 and 64 in 2006). In October 2008 it was announced that Greece would purchase 420 BMP-3Ms from Russia.

In late 2014, a number of BMP-1A1 Osts were fitted with the ZU-23-2 anti-aircraft gun in place of the standard turret. In 2019, Greece handed over 101 BMP-1s to Egypt following an agreement concluded in 2017. On 31 May 2022, it was announced that Greece would engage in an exchange of vehicles with Germany: Germany would hand over Marder 1A3s it kept in storage in exchange for an equivalent number of BMP-1s to be delivered by Greece to aid Ukraine in the 2022 Russian invasion of Ukraine.

==== Sweden ====
Sweden purchased 338 Soviet-manufactured ex-East German BMP-1s in mid-1994 and an additional 12 in 1996. They gave the vehicle the designation 'Pbv 501' (Pansarbandvagn 501). All Pbv 501 IFVs were upgraded to Swedish Army standards (Pbv 501A) from 1996 with the help of Czech specialists. A few were upgraded further to serve as command vehicles. There were 340 vehicles in service in 2006 when they were withdrawn from the I 2, I 12, and I 16 infantry regiments, and the P 4 armored regiment. 250 vehicles were in mint condition having driven less than 120 km. Sweden offered its BMP-1s, plus spare parts and training equipment for sale. The original plan was to sell them to a single foreign customer. They might also be sold in batches of fifty to separate states; customers were to express their interest before 16 June 2008 and submit their bids before 15 August 2008. Transactions were to be approved by the Swedish and German authorities (Sweden held the German end user certificate). The other option considered was scrapping the vehicles in Sweden, according to the regulations. It was announced in December 2008 that the Czech Republic had purchased all Swedish BMP-1s (PBV 501) and spares.

==== Wars of former USSR states ====
BMP-1s were used by opposing forces during almost all military conflicts on the territory of former USSR.

During the First Nagorno-Karabakh War, Nagorno-Karabakh Armenians captured 49 BMP-1s which belonged to the Russian 366th motorized rifle regiment. It was being withdrawn from Stepanakert at the time (March 1992). Between 1992 and 1994 Azerbaijan lost 38 BMP-1s and Armenia lost from 51 to 53 IFVs in battles. For that conflict, Nagorno-Karabakh Armenians made an interesting field modification. Six 9M14M "Malyutka" ATGMs were fitted on an elevatable mount from the 9P122 tank destroyer on the top of the turret at the rear.

When the War in Abkhazia (1992-1993) began on 14 August 1992, Georgia had an overwhelming superiority in the number of AFVs over the Abkhazian forces with their initial 2 APCs and 6 IFVs. The Georgian Army received 111 BMP-1s after the withdrawal of the Russian 10th motor rifle division from Akhaltsikhe. The Russian division of the Ministry of Internal Affairs gave 6 BMPs to the Georgians (Georgia had promised not to use AFVs in local disputes), an additional 25 BMP-1s were captured by the Georgians in the Tbilisi tank repair workshops. But the Abkhazians got several dozens of BMP-1s, (delivered from Russia and captured from the Georgians). The first damaged Georgian BMP was captured on 28 August 1992, (that vehicle was repaired and used by the Abkhazians during the defense of Tkvarcheli). During the Battle of Gagra, Abkhazian forces captured 12 Georgian BMPs on 2 October 1992. 2 BMP-1s were destroyed and at least 4 were captured after the defeat of the Georgian group in Gagra. The Georgians lost 2 BMPs and the Abkhazians lost 4 BMPs during the unsuccessful Abkhaz night offensive on Shroma, (the village on the Gumista river not far from Sukhumi) on 3–4 November 1992. The Georgians had around 70 IFVs in Sukhumi before the Abkhaz offensive took place on 15 March 1993. During the war, the Abkhazians used several BMP-1s with additional side armor screens.

During Russo-Georgian war BMP-1 was used by both sides, but mostly by Russian forces, BMP-1 saw rather limited usage by Georgian side in active fighting, During conflict Russian army lost 10 BMP-1s and 4 BMP-1Ps, Georgian army lost 2 BMP-1s while 15 upgraded BMP-1U were captured intact by Russian forces, 3 BMP-1s of Russian peacekeeping force with side numbers 610,614 and 625 were destroyed by Georgian T-72 tanks in opening hours of conflict, Another 3 BMP-1s fell victim to Georgian T-72SIM1 tanks near village of Tbeti near Tskhinvali, While others were destroyed or disabled by Georgian RPG and artillery fire, from 2 lost Georgian BMPs one was destroyed when it suffered from ammo cook-off near Gori-Tbilisi Highway, While another one was destroyed by Russian forces when they captured it near Gori.

=== List of conflicts ===
- 1973:Yom Kippur War (Egypt, Syria)
- 1975–1990: Lebanese Civil War (Syria)
  - 1982–1983: Lebanese Civil War, Phase III (Syria)
- 1975–1991: Western Sahara War (Polisario)
- 1975–2002: Angolan Civil War
- 1978–1987: Chadian–Libyan conflict (Libya, Chad)
  - 1986–1987: Toyota War (Libya, Chad)
- 1979–1988: Soviet–Afghan War (Soviet Union, Afghanistan)
- 1980–1988: Iran–Iraq War (Iran, Iraq)
- 1983–2009: Sri Lankan Civil War (India)
- 1988–1993: Georgian Civil War
  - 1991–1992: War in South Ossetia
  - 1992–1993: War in Abkhazia
- 1988–1994: First Nagorno-Karabakh War (Armenia, Azerbaijan)
- 1989: Georgian-Ossetian conflict
- 1990–1991: First Persian Gulf War (Iraq)
- 1992–1997: Civil War in Tajikistan
- 1994 – Civil War in Yemen
- 1994–1996: First Chechen War (Russia and Chechen forces)
- 1999–2009: Second Chechen War (Russia)
- 2001: War in Afghanistan (2001–2021)
- 2003: Iraq War
  - 2003: Invasion of Iraq (Iraq)
- 2008: Russo-Georgian War (Russia, Georgia, South Ossetia, Abkhazia)
- 2011: 2011 Libyan civil war (Pro-Gaddafi and anti-Gaddafi forces)
- 2011: Second Ivorian Civil War (Pro-Gbagbo forces)
- 2011–present: Syrian civil war (Syrian Government forces, ISIL, and rebels)
- 2012–present: Mali War (Chad)
- 2014–present: Russo-Ukrainian War (Russia, Ukraine)
  - 2014–2022: War in Donbas (Ukraine, Donetsk People's Republic, Luhansk People's Republic)
  - 2022–present: 2022 Russian invasion of Ukraine (Russia, Ukraine)
- 2014–2017: War in Iraq (Iraqi government forces, ISIL)
- 2015–present: Yemeni Civil War (Hadi-government forces and Houthis)
- 2020: Nagorno-Karabakh war (Artsakh, Azerbaijan)
- 2023: Afghanistan-Iran clash (Afghanistan)

=== BMP-1s in film and TV ===
Captain Tankboy uses a modified BMP-1 as his main military vehicle in the Destruction TV show. Tankboy.

A BMP-1 was used in the film Proof of Life starring Russell Crowe and Meg Ryan.

A BMP-1 was used in the film Harrison's Flowers starring Andie MacDowell and Adrien Brody.

A desert camo BMP-1 was used in the film Bravo Two Zero starring Sean Bean.

Two BMP-1's were used in the film Behind Enemy Lines starring Owen Wilson and Gene Hackman.
