= Tankboy TV =

- Also known as: Tankboy
- Genre: Reality Television
- Written by: Charles Knight
- Directed by: Nigel Cope
- Starring: Charles Knight aka Captain Tankboy; Paul Blenkiron aka Humma; Nick Scott aka Nuke; Sarah Bailey aka Legs; Evana Patterson aka Sarge; Iana Bikoulova aka Russian Sarge; Tina Knight aka Gungirl
- Voices of: Jochen Fitzherbert
- Theme music composer: David McIvor and Paul Burrnel
- Composer: Jeco Music NY
- No. of seasons: 1
- No. of episodes: 14

Production
- Producer: Charles Knight
- Running time: 22 Minutes
- Production company: Tankboy Global Ltd

Original release
- Network: Interesnoe TV
- Release: 29 June 2009

Tankboy TV or Tankboy (Танкбой in Russia and Kazakhstan) is a reality show based on the antics of Captain Tankboy and his crew as they travel the world, blowing things up, driving tanks over cars, building rockets and generally creating havoc.

The show is often touted as the next generation in destruction television and the show's tagline "Girls, Guns and Tanks!" has become infamous with the politically correct.

== Cast ==
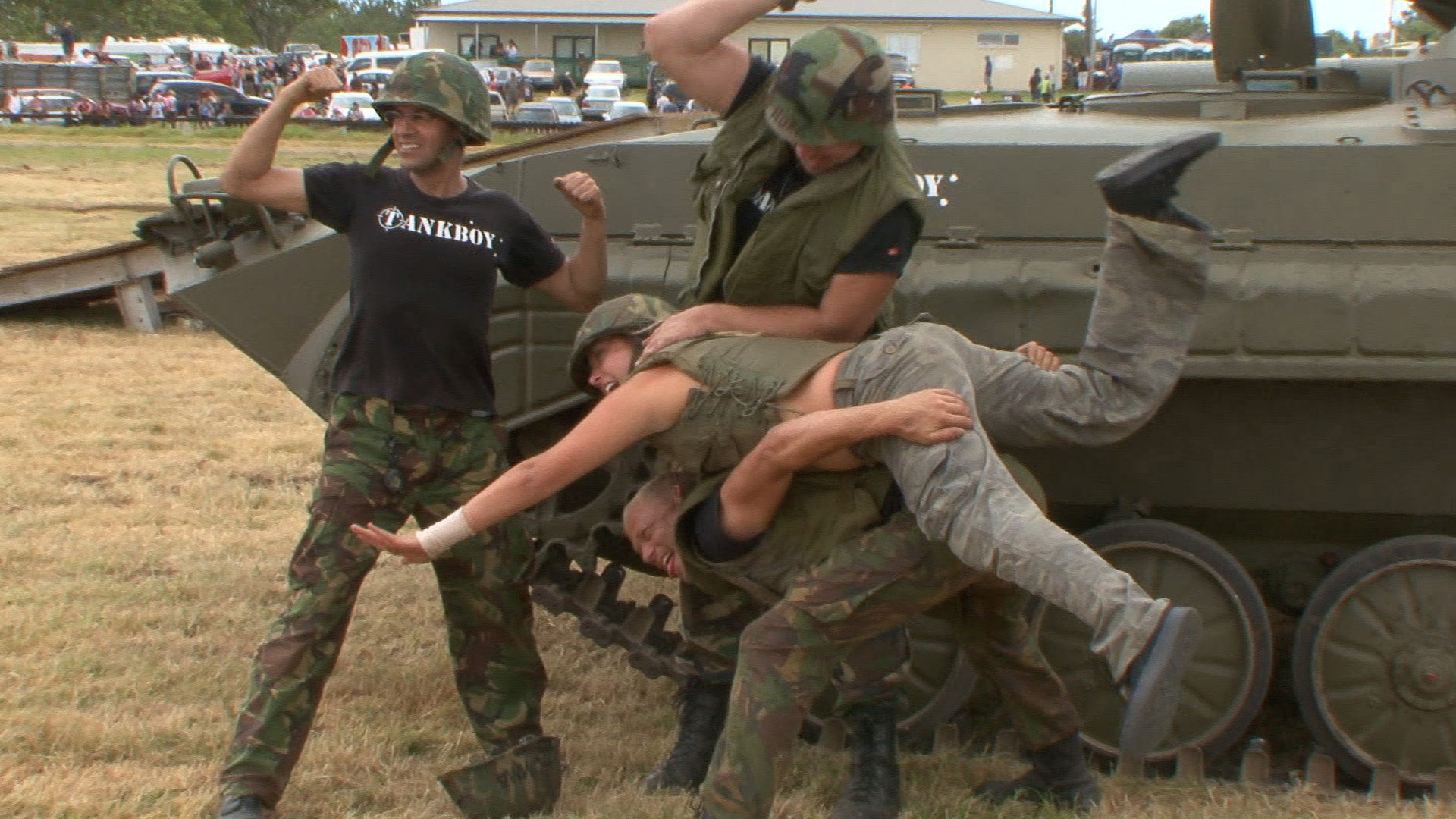
Some members of the Tankboy Crew after a live stunt show. Characters L-R, Captain Tankboy, Nuke, Sarge and Humma (on the bottom)

The show has six main characters:

- Captain Tankboy Charles Knight, a licensed arms dealer and explosives expert, who works on a strict military style 'need to know' policy.
- The Sarge Evana Patterson, an ex-model and glamor queen starred for five episodes. After that, a new sarge, known as the Russian Sarge Iana Bikoulova appeared. A blonde Russian girl with attitude.
- Krispy Jody Hooker, is the crew engineer who manages to fix anything, anywhere, anytime.
- Humma Paul Blenkiron, Nuke Nick Scott and Legs Sarah Bailey form the remainder of the crew. And as always, they end up in all sorts of crazy and unbelievable situations.
- Gungirl Tina Knight only appeared in one episode of Tankboy season 1, though she is rumored to return for season 2.

== Vehicles ==
The main "tank" used in the show is a Russian BMP-1 infantry fighting vehicle, but Tankboy also uses a British Sabre light tank when the need for a small, lightweight tank arises.

Other common vehicles used on the show include a 6-wheeled British amphibious army truck, the Stalwart FV622, an International fire engine and an ex-Army Land Rover.

== Guns ==
The show uses two primary firearms, the M4 carbine and the Heckler & Koch G36. But they also use a number of other military firearms, most of which are owned by the Captain who is also a licensed firearms dealer.

== History ==
Koichi Sakamoto and the Alpha Stunts team provided stunt training for Captain Tankboy and the Tankboy Crew in December 2007, just before filming began. Koichi also directed fight scenes for a Tankboy episode, "Operation Stuntman".

The Tankboy Crew performed live stunts and entertainment at such events as the Kumeu Car Show, SmashFest, Big Boys Toys, The Great Lakes Medieval Festival and numerous war re-enactments.

Tankboy Season 1 was shot in New Zealand in 2008 and is screening worldwide. The show has become very popular in Russia and Kazakhstan.

In January 2011, Team Tankboy ran in the CannonBall Run car rally in Auckland, New Zealand, and won third place. The vehicle they competed in was Tankboy's own ex-US Army Humvee, making it the first time a military Humvee had been used on the CannonBall Run.

The Tankboy crew filmed with Dai Henwood in 2009. and with Greg Murphy for the TV series, Crash Course in late 2011/early 2012.
