= Charles Knight (filmmaker) =

New Zealand filmmaker

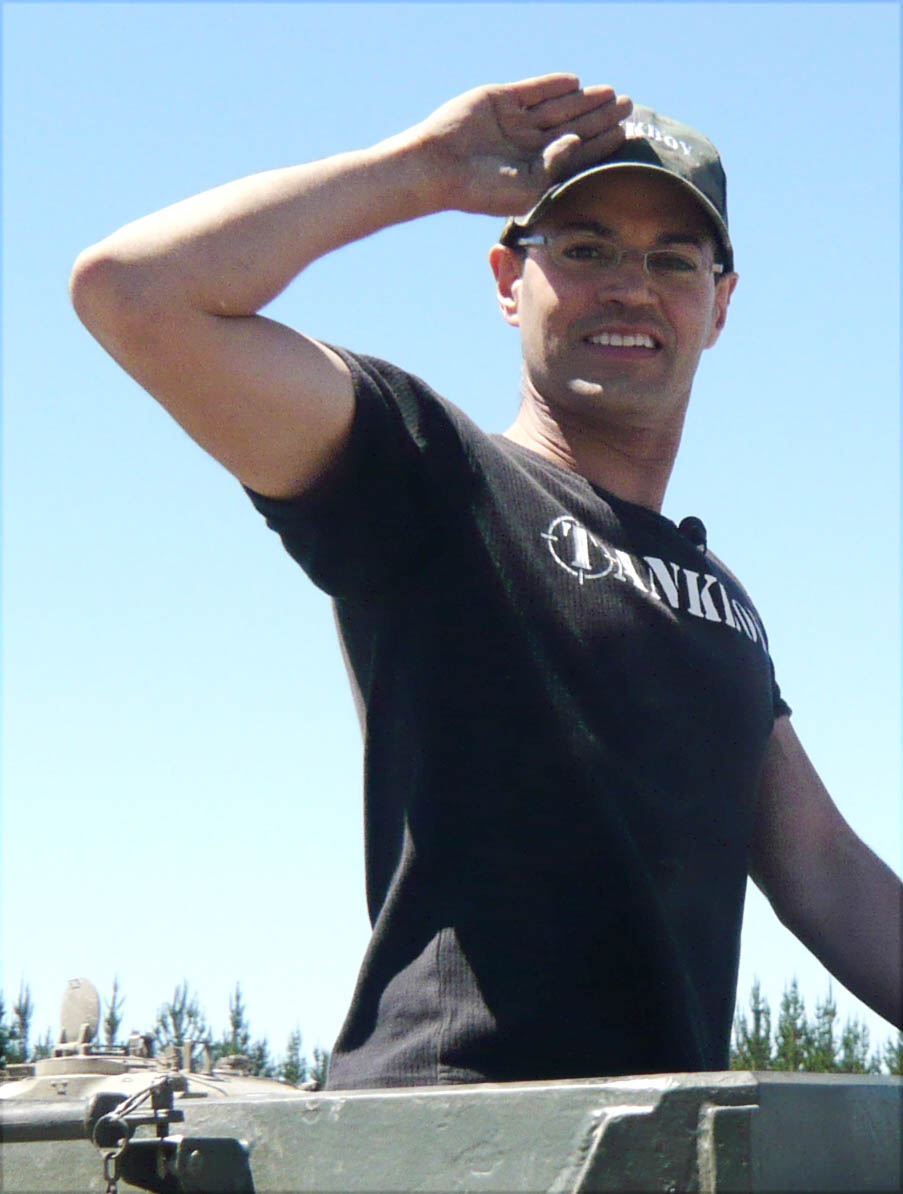
- Knight during a break from filming
- Born: 1967 (age 58–59); Eltham, Taranaki, New Zealand
- Other name: Tankboy
- Occupation: Filmmaker
- Years active: 1987—present

Charles Knight (nicknamed "Tankboy") (born 1967) is a New Zealand filmmaker.

== Life and career ==
In his late teens, Knight left New Zealand and moved to London, where he started work in the film and television industry. In his filmmaking career, Knight worked as a stunt driver, armorer, pyro-technician, editor, post supervisor, producer and writer.

Over the last 10 years, Knight has worked primarily as a producer for US studios, namely Starz Entertainment and Disney.

He developed a keen interest in action drama during his time working with Koichi Sakamoto on the Disney series Power Rangers.

More recently, Knight has been co-producing with filmmakers Rob Tapert and Sam Raimi and is a member of the PGA (Producers Guild of America).

== Filmography ==
Charles Knight with compositor Jill Round during a promotional event for Spartacus

A selection of Knight's work.

- Ash vs. Evil Dead
- Spartacus: Gods of the Arena
- Tankboy TV
- Power Rangers
- Wendy Wu: Homecoming Warrior
- Whale Rider
- Being Eve
- Shortland Street
- Once Were Warriors
- Superman

== Personal life ==
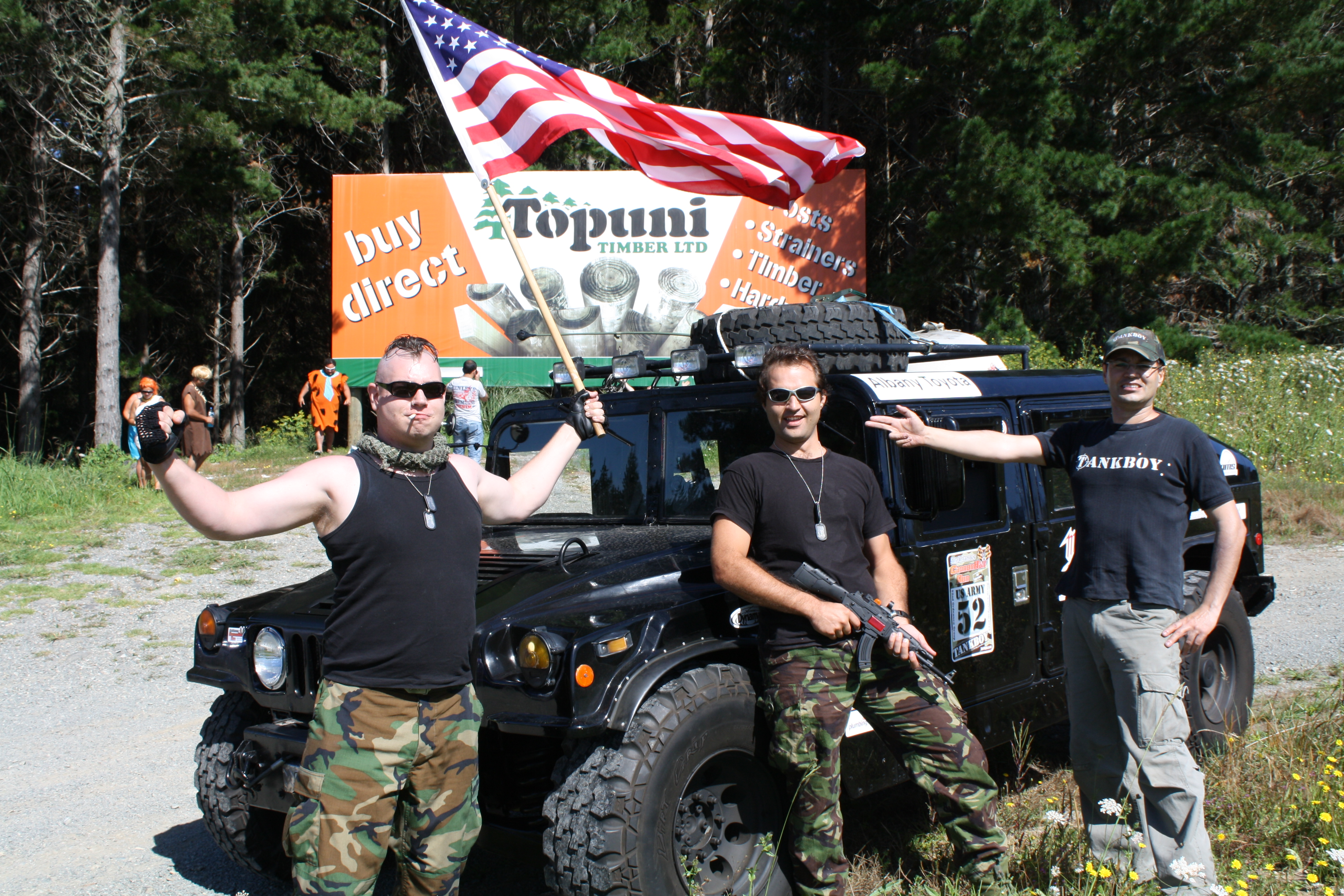
CannonBall Run 2011

Knight is a military vehicle enthusiast, a gun collector and pyrotechnic specialist.

In October 2009, Knight was involved in an incident involving one of his military vehicles. While taking a tank for a spin, a friend accidentally got injured when the tanks turret turned and squashed her, breaking four of her ribs.

In January 2011, Knight lead a team for his first try at the CannonBall Run car rally in Auckland, New Zealand. His team, "Team Tankboy" took third place. The vehicle they entered into the rally was an ex-US Army Humvee, making it the first time a Humvee had been used on the CannonBall Run.
