= Simon Kooper =

Captain of the ǃKharakhoen (Fransman Nama)

- was the Captain of the ǃKharakhoen (Fransman Nama)
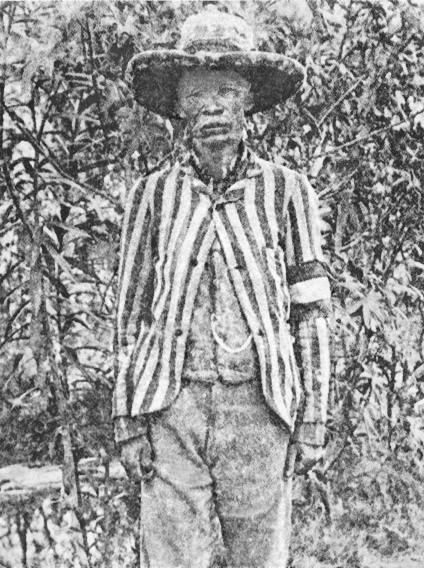
- Simon Kooper (1860–1913), leader of the Fransman-Nama
- Born: (c. 1860
- Died: 31 January 1913
Names
- Simon Kooper

Simon Kooper (Nama: |Gomxab; before 1860 – 31 January 1913) was the Captain of the ǃKharakhoen (Fransman Nama), a subtribe of the Nama people in Namibia from 1863 to 1909. He became famous for leading the Nama in the Herero and Nama War of 1904–1908.

== Early life ==
Kooper was born in Pella in the Northern Cape. It is not known when his clan moved to South-West Africa but in the mid-1850s the ǃKharakhoen under Piet Koper already resided there. At that time the ǃKharakhoen were one of the Nama clans allied to the Oorlam Afrikaners at Windhoek. When this alliance was defeated by merchant Andersson's private army in the Battle of Otjimbingwe on 15 June 1863, Piet Koper was killed and Simon Kooper ascended to chieftaincy.

Kooper was looking for a place for his clan to settle permanently. Only in 1889 could a missionary be found to stay with them. The Fransman tribe settled at Gochas with him which since then is their clan's main settlement.

== Conflict with Imperial Germany ==
After supporting the ǀKhowesin (Witbooi Nama) under Hendrik Witbooi in their eventually unsuccessful resistance attempt towards German colonialism in South-West Africa, Kooper was forced to sign a protection treaty with the German Empire, represented by Governor Theodor Leutwein. This treaty was in effect until the Herero and Nama War of 1904–1908 began in which Kooper sided with Witbooi again.

The Germans defeated the Nama in the Battle of Swartfontein on 15 January 1905 and forced them to flee first into the Kalahari Desert and then to recede into Bechuanaland, the British colony that later became Botswana. From there they repeatedly and for several years mounted guerrilla-style attacks at the colony's Schutztruppe (Protection Force), actions that made Kooper rise to fame.

After Witooi's death end of October 1905, Kooper and Jakob Morenga took over the leadership of the Nama uprising. When Morenga was captured by the British in 1906, Kooper alone led the Nama activities against the Germans. He was imprisoned at Shark Island near Lüderitz in 1907 but escaped into the Karas Mountains where Morenga had used the old Nama fortress ǁKhauxaǃnas as hideout for his rebels.

Kooper was the last Nama leader still to fight against the Germans until 1908, and the only one never to be captured again after his escape from Shark Island. German troops launched several attacks at his group. In the last of these pursuits at Seatsub in March 1908, most of the Nama under Kooper were killed and his wife was taken prisoner, but he managed to flee again. This raid contravened the international law of the time because it took place outside German jurisdiction. German writers Hans Grimm and Fritz von Unruh took this incident as basis for one of their literary works, respectively, which made this episode known to the German public.

After this last attempt to capture him, German and British colonial forces negotiated a ceasefire, granting an annual allowance for the rest of his life in return for the cessation of all hostilities from his side. Simon Kooper received 100 £ in 1908, 75 £ in 1909 and 60 £ in the years thereafter from this agreement. He died in Lokgwabe, Botswana, on 31 January 1913.

== See also ==
- German South-West Africa
- Herero and Nama genocide
