= Hornkranz massacre =

1893 massacre in German South West Africa

Coordinates: 23°21′54″S 16°25′57″E

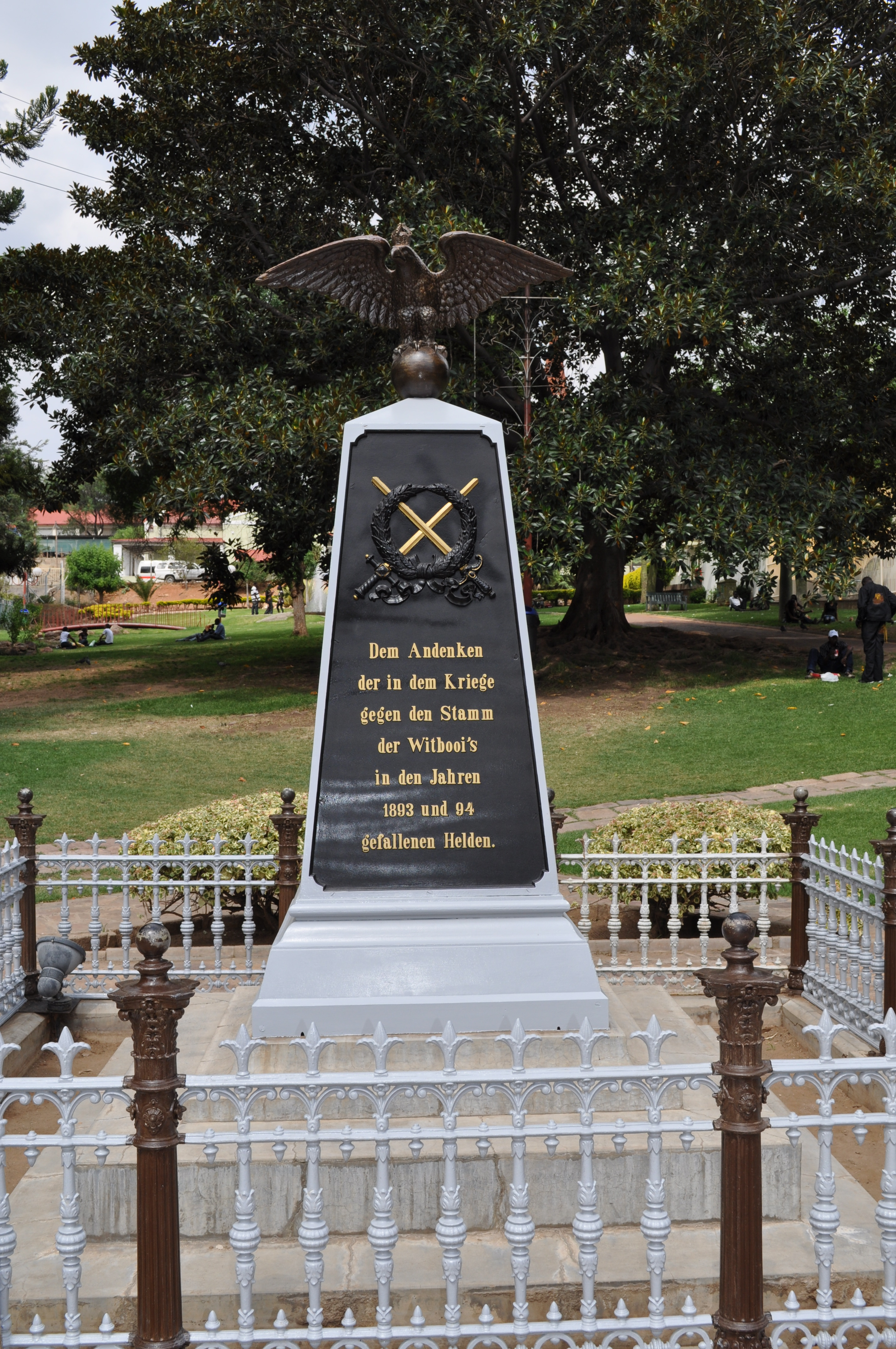
Memorial in Windhoek to German soldiers killed during the Nama uprising of 1893–1894

The Hornkranz massacre was the killing of 88 indigenous ǀKhowesin people by German colonial troops on 12 April 1893. The massacre took place in the village of ǁNâǂgâs (later renamed Hornkranz) in German South West Africa, which is now part of the Khomas Region of Namibia. Of the dead, 78 were women and children.

== Background ==
The German Empire established the colony of German South West Africa in 1884, which soon became a settler colony, leading to conflict with local indigenous peoples. Around the same time that the Germans established the colony, the ǀKhowesin, a subgroup of the Nama people, established the village of ǁNâǂgâs around a perennial spring. Interaction between the ǀKhowesin and Germans remained rare until 1892, when German colonial authorities began to pressure Hendrik Witbooi, the chief of the ǀKhowesin, into signing "protection treaties" with Germany. Witbooi saw the treaties as a form of subjugation, once remarking:

What are we being protected against? From what danger or difficulty, or suffering can one chief be protected by another?... I see no truth or sense, in the suggestion that a chief who has surrendered may keep his autonomy and do as he likes.

From 1892 onwards, German colonial cartographers began including ǁNâǂgâs in maps of the colony, where it was marked as "proposed Crown Land". Angered by Witbooi's refusal and fearing an alliance between the Nama and Herero, Curt von François, the governor of German South West Africa, decided to launch an unprovoked attack on the village.

== Massacre ==
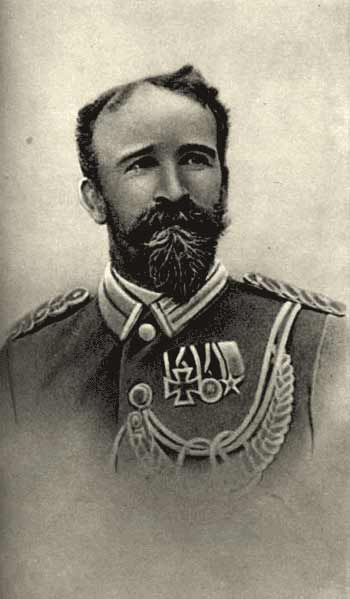
Curt von François, who led the attack on ǁNâǂgâs

On 12 April 1893, 225 German colonial soldiers under François approached the village before dawn, hoping to attack under the cover of night. Upon their arrival near the village, the Germans split into three columns to make a surprise attack. François led one column to attack the village from the north, while a subordinate, Kurd Schwabe, led another column against the village from the east. Witbooi saw the approaching troops, allegedly while sitting in front of his house, and immediately ordered all the fighters in the village to retreat towards the Kuiseb River and assume defensive positions along the riverbed, expecting the Germans to follow them.

Though possible exchanges of gunfire between the retreating ǀKhowesin fighters and François' soldiers occurred, the Germans stopped when they reached the village and began firing at the non-combatants who had stayed behind. The attacking troops reportedly discharged 16,000 rounds within 30 minutes, with Schwabe's diary recording that several villagers were burned alive inside their homes, something supported by testimonies of descendants of the massacre. 88 villagers were killed, including one of Witbooi's sons and 78 women and children, while 100 more were taken prisoner by the Germans. On the next day, the Germans returned and burned what remained of the village.

== Aftermath ==
The brutality of the German attack shocked Witbooi, who had not expected the Germans to use such "uncivilised" methods against his people. Despite François hoping the attack would intimidate them into backing down, the ǀKhowesin were angered and vowed to fight back. Witbooi, having escaped the massacre along with most of his fighters, proceeded to wage a costly and destructive guerrilla war against the Germans, though without targeting non-combatants. The ǀKhowesin made repeated attempts to recapture ǁNâǂgâs, which had been garrisoned with German troops, resulting in four skirmishes, though the area remained in German hands. The village was eventually renamed Hornkranz by the Germans.

François, only having less than 300 troops under his command, was unable to defeat the insurgency. He attempted to drive the Nama into the Omaheke Desert, as would later occur during the Herero and Nama genocide, but was unsuccessful. Following this failure, François was replaced by Theodor Leutwein, who was tasked with ending the war quickly and without loss of face for the colonial government. Leutwein's handling of the war was more successful, and in August 1894 he forced Witbooi to sign a protection treaty at Naukluft that ceded much of his people's land and obliged him to join the Germans in future attacks against other indigenous groups, most notably the Herero during the opening stages of the genocide in 1904. After being compelled to participate in it, the Nama people were later targeted by the genocide.

News of the massacre was reported and condemned in numerous newspapers, although both German and Cape Colony authorities tried to cover it up. François's own lieutenant, Josef von Bülow, reflected on the counterproductive nature of the massacre, noting that Witbooi more than doubled his forces in its aftermath. Following the genocide, the site of the massacre was used as a police station before being sold into private ownership and converted into a farm. Two plaques are located at the site of the massacre, which has been affected by overgrazing and bush encroachment; the first was installed by the Nama during a 1997 commemoration of the event, while the other glorifies the German troops who committed the massacre, which is described as a "battle". In September 2023 Forensic Architecture, a multidisciplinary research group based at Goldsmiths, University of London, investigated the massacre by conducting fieldwork at the massacre site to substantiate the Nama belief that this was "the first act of genocide" against them.
