= Herero and Nama genocide =

1904–1908 genocide by the German Empire

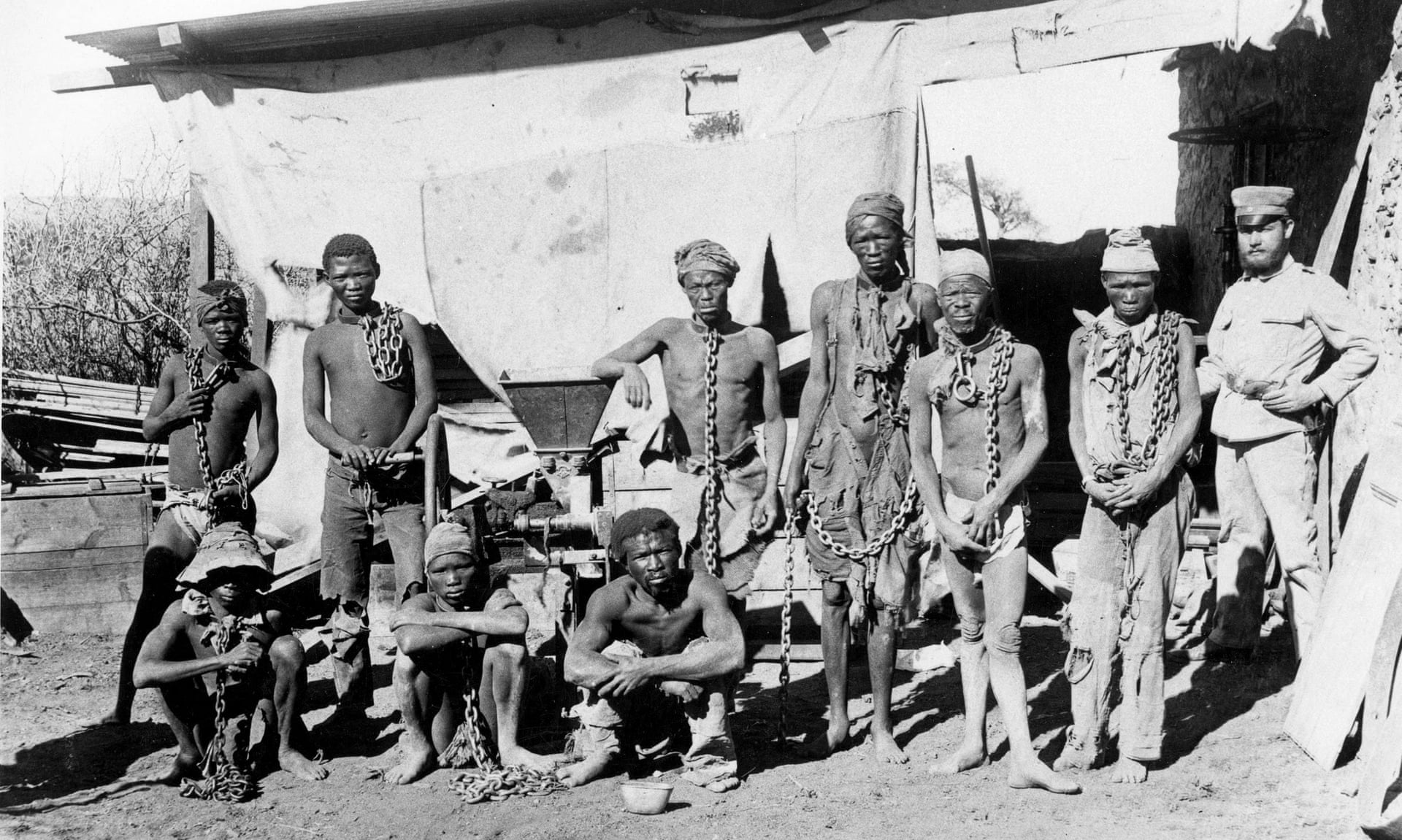
- Chained Herero and Nama prisoners during the genocide
- Location: German South West Africa (modern-day Namibia)
- Date: 1904–1908
- Target: Herero and Nama peoples
- Deaths: 40,000 to 80,000 Hereros; 10,000 Nama
- Perpetrators: Marine Infantry of the Kaiserliche Marine under Lothar von Trotha; also Imperial Schutztruppe for German South West Africa and settlers

The Herero and Nama genocide, or the Namibian genocide, was the extermination of the Herero and the Nama people in German South West Africa (now Namibia) perpetrated by the German Empire between 1904 and 1908. Around 40,000 to 80,000 Hereros (80 percent of their pre-war population) and 10,000 Nama (half of their pre-war population) died.

Facing the consolidation of German rule and attempts to subjugate Africans into a subordinate labor reserve, Herero chief Samuel Maharero launched a surprise uprising on 12 January 1904. Initially, the Herero uprising was a success, although colonists were enraged at being defeated by a people they considered inferior. After reinforcements arrived from Germany, the Herero were surrounded and routed at the Battle of Waterberg in August.

During the following months, they fled into the Omaheke Desert where a majority died from thirst, starvation, or small-scale German massacres. German commander Lothar von Trotha ordered the execution of all Herero men, but in practice, women and children were also killed. Kaiser Wilhelm II ordered Trotha to abolish the expulsion and extermination policy which led to the incarceration of all Herero people in concentration camps, where around half of those captured died due to disease, malnourishment and overwork.

The Nama initially fought alongside the Germans, including against the Herero at Waterberg. However, they revolted against the Germans in September 1904, which lasted until 1908. On 22 April 1905, limited by Wilhelm's veto on his earlier expulsion and extermination policy against the Herero, Trotha introduced a new policy that gave Nama the option of surrender and incarceration instead of execution.

In 2015, Germany acknowledged that a genocide had been committed. Later negotiations with the Namibian government led to a controversial deal in 2021, according to which Germany would pay out 1.1 billion euros (US$1.3 billion) in the form of ex gratia development aid, while rejecting any legal responsibility for the genocide.

== Background ==
The Bantu-speaking Herero people migrated to present-day Namibia from the north as early as the twelfth century. They lived mainly as pastoralists, with cattle central to their culture and economy, indicated by the name Herero meaning "possessor of cattle". For much of the nineteenth century, they were embroiled in conflict over grazing land and water with neighboring Khoikhoi groups, including the Nama people, to the south. From the 1840s, the region began to be drawn into global commercial networks with the arrival of Rhenish missionaries and expansion of the Cape Colony to the south. San peoples were also displaced from the Cape Colony and driven northwards into Namibia, increasing conflicts.

=== German colonization ===
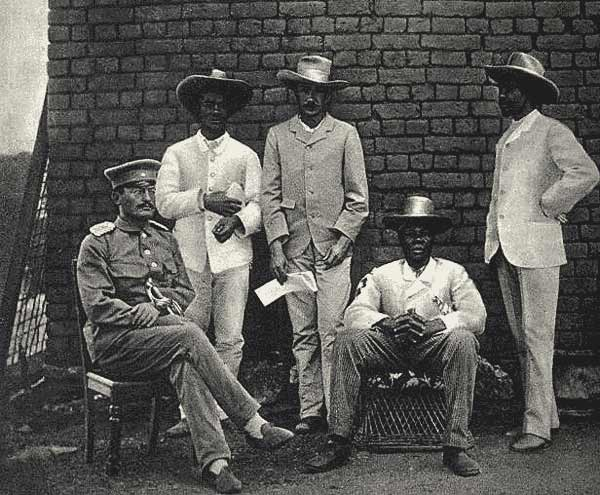
Theodor Leutwein (seated left), Zacharias Zeraua (2nd from left) and Manasseh Tyiseseta (seated, fourth from left), in 1895

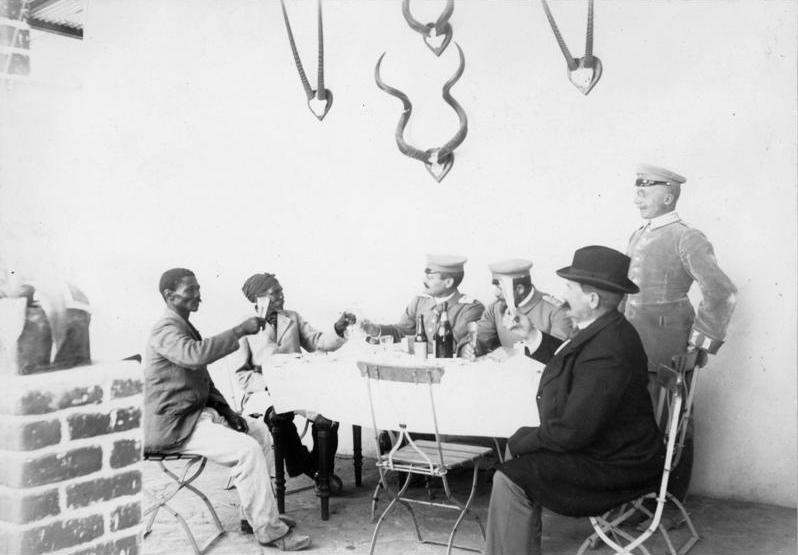
Theodor Leutwein toasting Hendrik Witbooi in 1896

In 1884, German chancellor Otto von Bismarck claimed Namibia to combat British expansion into the region. German rule was initially nominal, with the first soldiers arriving in 1889. Significant numbers of settlers did not begin to arrive until the mid-1890s. The German presence was so minimal that the two main tribal groups in the area, the Herero and the Nama, viewed each other as the primary threat, while for the Germans, an alliance between the two warring tribes could have threatened the existence of Germany's only settler colony.

The territory's third governor, Theodor Leutwein (from 1894 to 1904) used pragmatic methods to achieve the destruction of the indigenous peoples' political independence and their reduction to a servile labor reserve. Because military conquest would have cost more than the German government was willing to spend, he minimized outright warfare by using a divide and rule strategy where indigenous tribes were forced to accept protection treaties against each other.

When these treaties were broken, Leutwein used his remaining allies to defeat the rebellious tribe and take their land and cattle, which was sold to settlers for a profit. In 1896 and 1897, he led campaigns that ended with the virtual extermination of the Khaua and Afrikaners (ǀAixaǀaen). Leutwein focused on expanding the colonial infrastructure, such as roads, railways, and forts, to open the land for more economic development and European settlement. Due to lack of success with prospecting, many colonists instead switched to accumulating land and cattle placing them in direct competition with Herero. Large amounts of land were bought up by speculators and European cattle farmers. The Herero were further weakened by a rinderpest epidemic that killed the majority of their cattle and exacerbated intratribal conflicts, while forcing many Herero to starvation, indebtedness, or becoming migrant laborers.

=== Grievances ===
The Herero's key grievance and the structural condition which led to the outbreak of the war was the existence of an unfair judicial system. If a white person was killed, multiple Africans would be executed as punishment. In contrast, settlers could kill natives with effective impunity because African lives were deemed worthless, so the judicial system would find a way to exonerate or issue a minimal punishment. The result was widespread murder and rape against Africans by settlers, which weakened the colonial administration's monopoly on violence and overall authority. The victims were powerless to get redress for these crimes because police and soldiers were among the perpetrators. German employers were legally allowed to beat and flog indigenous employees.

At the same time, Leutwein began to implement a strategy to concentrate indigenous people on reserves. Although some studies have emphasized struggle over land as the central cause of the uprising, the colonist population was not quickly increasing in 1903 and other research has shown that the land question was not urgent.

== Herero uprising ==
The Herero uprising was an act of desperation to retake their land, cattle, and political independence; as well as exact revenge. Historian Matthias Häussler writes that the war was limited in means but not ends; the Herero wanted the permanent end of German colonization. On 25 December 1903, a company of Schutztruppe had been diverted to the far south of the colony to quell an unrelated uprising by the Bondelswarts Nama, leaving the north stripped of troops—there were only 770 German soldiers in the entire colony.

The Herero clans seized the opportunity to rebel on 12 January 1904. The uprising caught the colonists by surprise and saw a stunning success at first: farms and businesses were plundered, and 123 or as many as 160 Germans were killed. Most of those killed were farmers and traders; German soldiers were only one-tenth of the dead. The rebels generally spared women, children, missionaries, and white people who were not German. Individual attacks were planned to take advantage of deception and surprise, and the Herero seized weapons and supplies. The Herero killed men, took anything useful, razed buildings, and attempted to destroy everything else, in an attempt to destroy colonists' economic existence and force them to depart Namibia forever. The occurrence of mutilation, particularly castration, was in revenge for the sexual violence that had previously been visited on Herero women.

Many aspects of the war are poorly understood due to lack of sources dealing with the Herero perspective. Conventional wisdom holds that the attack was planned long in advance, perhaps at a 1903 tribal meeting. However, historian Jan-Bart Gewald has instead argued that it was provoked by Ralph Zürn, a German officer stationed in Okahandja, where Herero chief Samuel Maharero also had his headquarters, and that other Herero gradually joined in as Maharero persuaded them to. Regardless, some Herero hesitated to join in the uprising and this doomed the effort, if it had any chance of success to begin with. Häussler argues that the uprising failed in the first few hours as there was no serious effort to seize German forts (which had a much larger quantity of valuable supplies) or towns (which were essential to the occupier's government).

=== Settlers' response ===
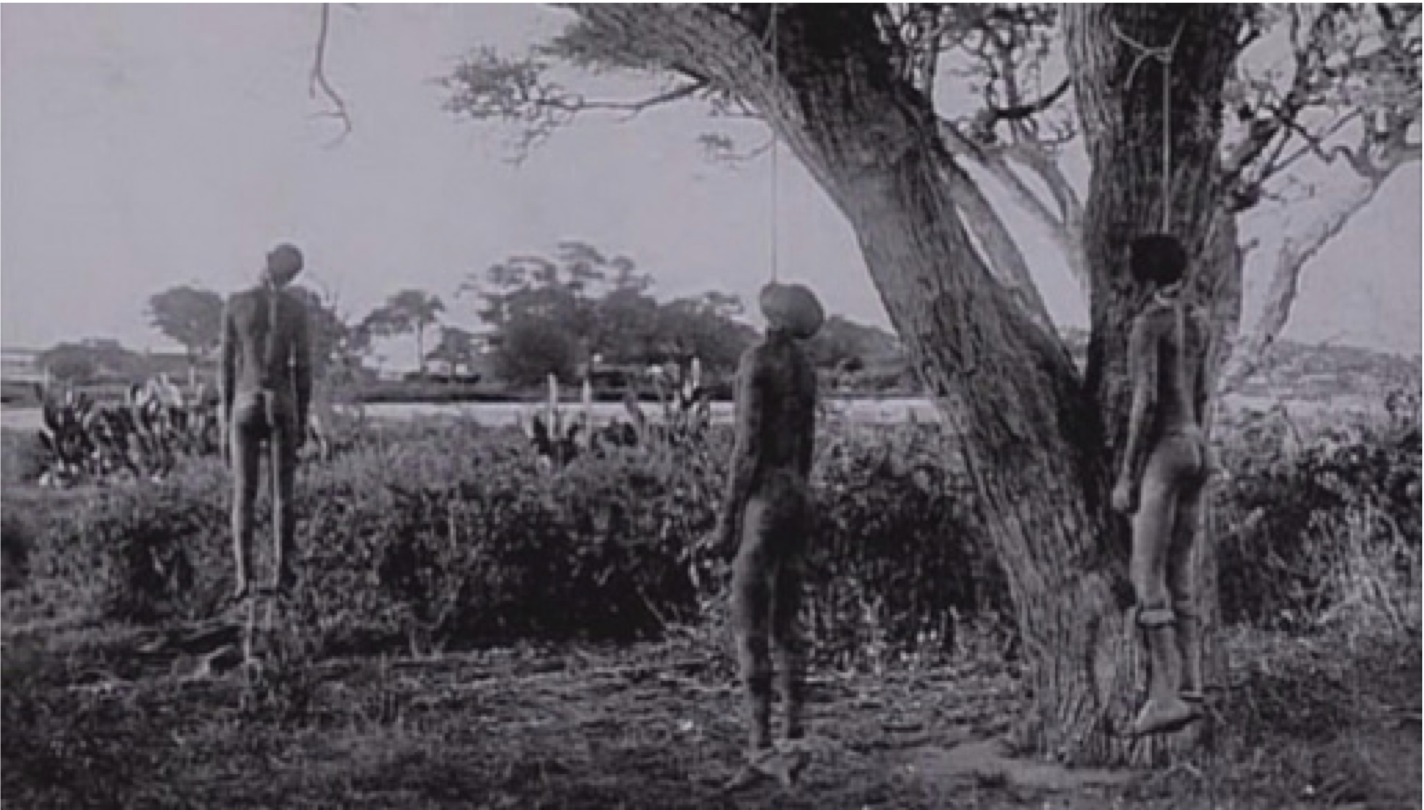
Hanging of Hereros, February 1904

In response to the attacks, the German settlers declared themselves victims and demanded full compensation of their losses from the imperial treasury. Public opinion in Germany, however, held them partly responsible for provoking the war. Exaggerated and fabricated atrocity propaganda portraying Herero as animal-like sadists spread widely with settler newspapers such as the Deutsch-Südwestafrikanische Zeitung playing a significant role in inciting violence. However, many colonists also welcomed the opportunity to decide the disputes over land and property in their own favor. Many colonists supported anything from the disarmament and dispossession of all Herero, to their imprisonment or even mass extermination. Leutwein, who argued against more radical proposals, believed that the Herero had to be rendered "politically dead". At the beginning of the uprising, captured Herero were subjected to hasty trials and quickly executed by shooting for cattle thievery. Women and children were also killed. From February, lynching was more common, and their naked bodies were strung up.

Many Germans were lucky to escape with their lives and huddled in improvised shelter, watching their possessions and businesses be destroyed and uncertain as to the fate of family and friends. The society mobilized quickly and reportedly even women carried arms. A large number of men volunteered for the militia, far outnumbering regular soldiers. Although they were later replaced by regular reinforcements, locals continued to be employed as guides and advisers, and the newly arrived soldiers adopted the same values. Panicked settlers started to round up any Hereros they could find, jailing all the women in Swakopmund in concentration camps and sending 550 men to Cape Town. Some were later sold to Cape Colony mine labor recruiters. An extreme desire for revenge took hold among most colonists, which missionaries unsuccessfully tried to quell. Even years later, after any threat had long since been crushed, the colonists' media continued to complain about the supposedly lenient treatment of the few remaining Hereros.

=== Response from Germany ===
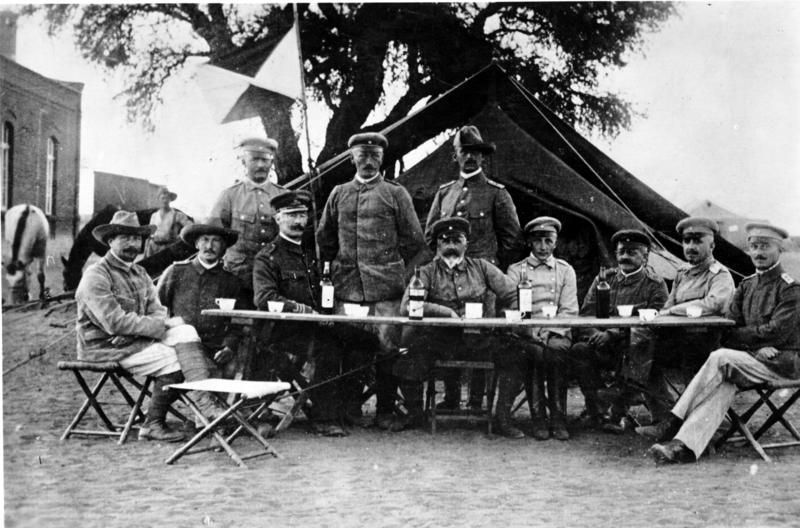
Central figure Lieutenant General Lothar von Trotha, the Oberbefehlshaber (Supreme Commander) of the protection force in German South West Africa, in Keetmanshoop during the Herero uprising, 1904

As news of the first atrocities against Herero reached Germany, socialists raised the matter in parliament. Demanded an explanation, Leutwein admitted that August Bebel was mostly correct in his assessment, but professed that he was unable to stop the violence that was demanded by the public and his soldiers, nor was he able to condemn it under the circumstances. With the German authorities unwilling and unable to control their own forces, violence escalated further on both sides. Leutwein's efforts to parley with Maharero in February failed after an angry backlash from both colonists and his superiors. Even after the arrival of reinforcements in March, Leutwein was unable to defeat the Herero's guerrilla tactics, and endured a series of defeats. The defeat of a great power by African tribes considered inferior was a unbearable humiliation for Germany's leaders.

Because his tactical retreat in the battle of Oviumbo was seen as a failure, the German General Staff lost confidence in Leutwein and replaced him as military commander by the general Lothar von Trotha, who arrived on 11 June with orders from Kaiser Wilhelm II to "crush the rebellion by all means necessary". Although Leutwein unsuccessfully attempted to make a separate peace with most of the Herero, Trotha refused offers of surrender. After months of build-up of supplies and troops, Trotha still had only 1,500 soldiers at Waterberg.

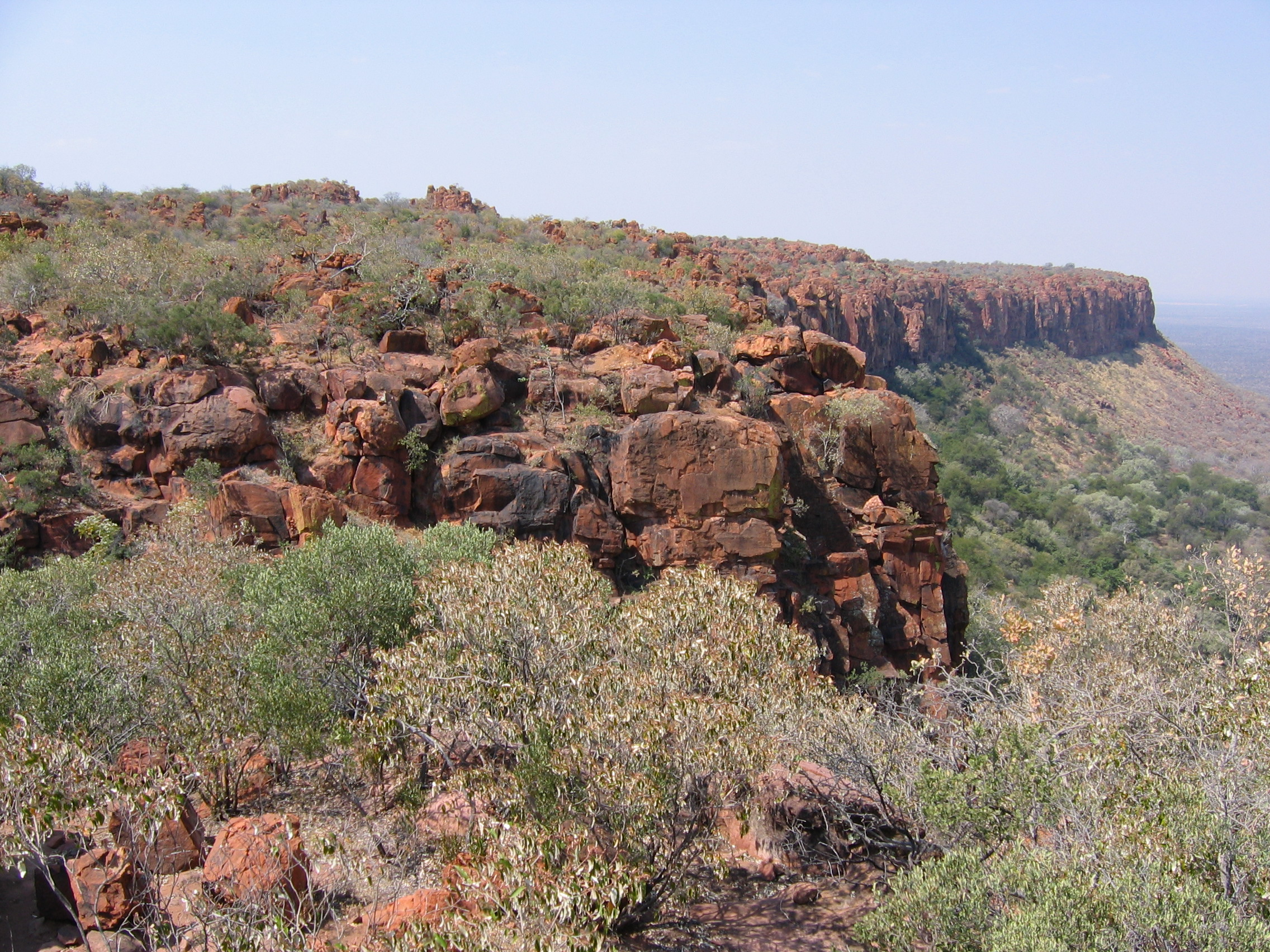
The terrain near Waterberg mountain in Namibia where the decisive battle was fought

After April perhaps hoping to help himself maintain control over the Herero chiefs, Maharero concentrated his forces—around 60,000 people and their cattle—at the base of Waterberg, a mountain with abundant food and grazing land. The Herero forces and supplies were running lower and lower, while the colonists received an influx of manpower and supplies from Germany. Maharero expected that he could stay until at least February; most of the Herero still hoped for a negotiated solution to the war. The concentration allowed the Germans to surround them and defeat them in a conventional battle on 11 August, negating the Herero's strengths at guerrilla warfare and amplifying their weakness in numbers and armament. After a day of battle, most of the Herero escaped to the southeast. Although Trotha declared victory, other German officers present disagreed, as the original aim had been to end the war with one blow.

== Pursuit into the desert ==
This bold enterprise reveals in the most brilliant light the ruthless energy of the German command in pursuing their beaten enemy. No pains, no sacrifices were spared in eliminating the last remnants of enemy resistance. Like a wounded beast the enemy was tracked down from one water-hole to the next, until finally he became the victim of his own environment. The arid Omaheke was to complete what the German army had begun: the extermination of the Herero nation.

— German official history

Initial attempts to pursue and force the Herero into another grand confrontation failed through August and into late September, when Maharero evaded German attempts to give battle. Despite Trotha's plans, the battle fragmented into smaller groups as his soldiers chased the Herero down the dry Eiseb and Epukiro riverbeds. Some water sources were guarded by Germans and others were poisoned to deny water to the fleeing people. Trotha's orders said to shoot over the heads of women and children to drive them away; however, in practice, when Schutztruppe encountered Herero, the latter were indiscriminately massacred. Although prisoner-of-war camps had been prepared prior to the confrontation at Waterberg, the tired, hungry, and thirsty German detachments were no longer in a position to take prisoners.

On 30 September, all efforts at pursuit had to be curtailed due to the exhaustion of German forces and the flight of remaining Herero deep into the desert. Trotha set up a series of military posts 155 miles (249 km) long between Gobabis and Grootfontein along the western edge of the desert. Although some historians suggest that this measure was intended to complete the genocide by preventing the Herero's return westwards, others argue that it was implausible that so few soldiers could actually guard such a long frontier. During this phase of the genocide, around 40,000 Herero died in the desert, many of dehydration.

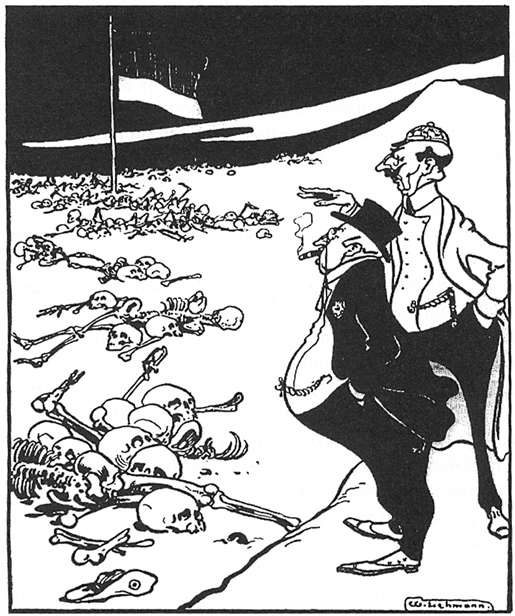
Der Wahre Jacob (1906): "Even if it hasn't brought in much profit and there are no better quality goods on offer, at least we can use it to set up a bone-grinding plant."

On 2 October, Trotha issued the notorious extermination order, stating that "Within the German boundaries, every Herero, with or without firearms, with or without cattle, will be shot. I won't accommodate women and children anymore." He was simply declaring what was already generally practiced by his troops, although it is debated whether he actually intended to kill all Herero or simply drive them out of the German colony. By explicitly ordering the murder of any Herero man caught by his forces, Trotha ruled out the possibility of surrender. With limited intelligence, it was not until late October that it became clear that the Herero no longer presented any real threat as many of them had died in the desert. Nevertheless, Trotha refused to reconsider, rejecting any and all pleas from missionaries, settlers, and even many of his senior officers. While Häussler argues that Trotha was motivated by rage and shame at being seemingly defeated by an inferior people, Historian Mohamed Adhikari points to more rational explanations: lack of supplies to feed prisoners, the risk of disease spreading to Germans, Trotha's desire that the Herero should never again pose a threat to the colony, and social Darwinist ideology that placed the racial struggle over practical considerations such as the value of indigenous labor.

Nevertheless, popular support for the war evaporated both in the colony and Germany. Socialist and Christian groups opposing it on humanitarian grounds; colonists opposed the wasteful destruction of Herero cattle and labor. Chancellor Bernhard von Bülow's government initially supported the war, but wavered as financial and reputational costs piled up. Trotha had issued the extermination order on his own authority, and due to communications delays, it is not clear if the head of the General Staff, Alfred von Schlieffen, tolerated it for a few months or a few days. Nevertheless, in November Schlieffen recommended rescinding the order as he was skeptical that Trotha could achieve the complete extermination or enslavement of the Herero, and therefore it was necessary to force them to surrender. Bülow appealed to the kaiser, who withdrew the order on 6 December. Reportedly, Trotha was enraged and initially refused to carry it out.

== Nama uprising ==
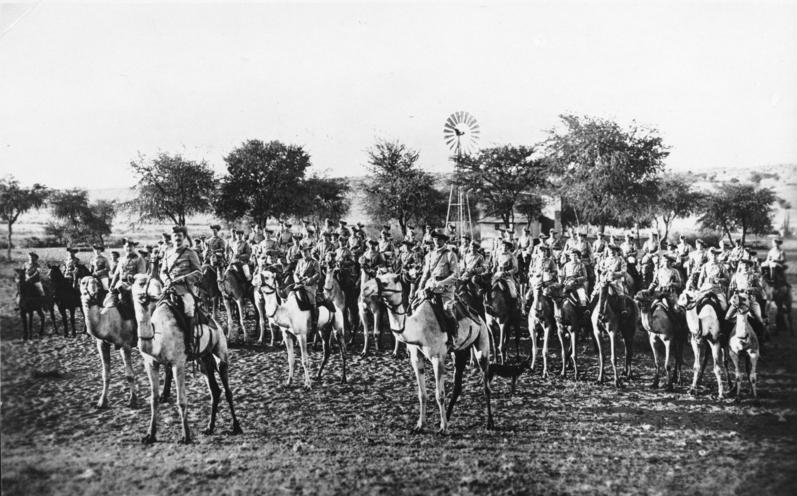
Schutztruppe in Namibia, 1904

According to their treaty obligations, at least a hundred Nama had fought alongside the Germans during the Bondelwarts campaign and at Waterberg, although these soldiers were sent into a deadly exile in Togo and Cameroon in November 1905. Following reports of how Herero were treated after that battle and ongoing rumors of the disarmament of the remaining Nama tribes, the ǀKhowesin chief Hendrik Witbooi, who had been allied with the Germans from 1894 to 1904, switched sides in September and was followed by a majority of Nama.

Many Nama were interned before they had the chance, and some refused to join the rebellion. German soldiers began to occupy water sources in their territory and rounded up any Nama that they could find. Trotha issued a second extermination order against the Nama on 22 April 1905. At the height of the war, 2,000 Nama fighters occupied 14,000 German soldiers. Unlike against the Herero, he offered negotiated peace to Nama who surrendered, with some success, although promises were not kept and those surrendered end up in the concentration camp system where most died. Trotha's failure to subdue the Nama led to his recall in late 1905, when he was replaced as governor by Friedrich von Lindequist. Against the advice of military officers engaged in the war, including Trotha's military replacement Berthold Deimling, Lindequist refused to consider a negotiated peace—despite the incredible difficulties posed by the proximity of British territory which the Nama exploited as a refuge from German attacks and elevated difficulty of resupplying German troops.

After the death of Witbooi in battle on 29 October 1905, Simon Kooper refused to sue for peace and rejected its official announcement by the kaiser on 31 March 1907. At the same, despite a partial peace hastily conduced by Leutwein after the outbreak of the Herero rebellion, many of the Bondelwarts under the leadership of Jakob Marengo and other chiefs continued to trouble the occupiers. Due to rising costs, parliament refused to authorize funds to continue the war, leading to the so-called "Hottentot election" in January 1907. After Marengo's death in late 1907, the Germans focused their efforts on eliminating Kooper. In 1908, he finally accepted a peace settlement in which he was paid to go into exile.

== Concentration camps ==
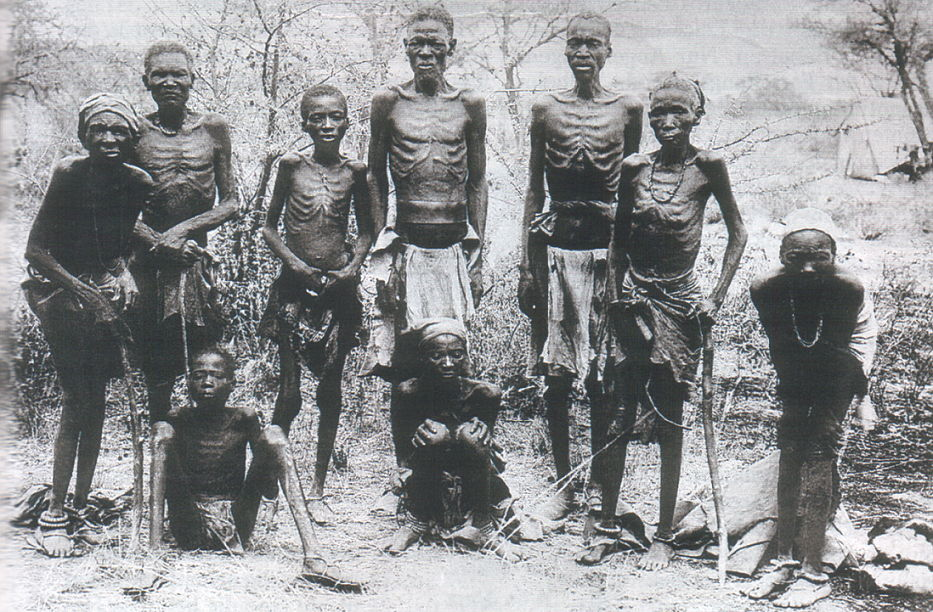
"Condition of Herero on surrender after having been driven into the desert"

After the withdrawal of the extermination order, the remaining survivors were instead to be imprisoned in concentration camps as prisoners of war. Despite Trotha's cordon, many Herero had managed to return westwards into more hospitable territory. Throughout 1905, soldiers combed the countryside in search of Herero; they also committed many acts of violence and even massacre. Word of the poor treatment of Herero who surrendered soon got out and stymied German efforts to encourage widespread surrenders. After Trotha was replaced by Deimling in 1906, missionaries took a more leading role in rounding up Herero. Some Herero were organized into armed "peace patrols", whose task was to go into the bush to persuade those still at large to capitulate using false promises of food and decent treatment. The number of prisoners taken increased substantially. After their services were no longer needed, the "peace patrollers" were also imprisoned in the concentration camps.

Most prisoners were in poor condition due to hunger and disease, and many died in transit or shortly after arriving to the camps. They were sent a long distance from home—often hundreds of kilometers. There were five main concentration camps at Windhoek, Okahandja, Karibib, Swakopmund, and Lüderitz, as well as smaller camps where Herero labor was especially needed. Three quarters were women and children, as men had been more likely to die during the war and evade capture.

The camps had poor conditions, with makeshift shelter surrounded by barbed wire, with hardly any sanitation system, and the prisoners had little clothing. The amount of food provided was inadequate and mainly came in the form of rice and flour that the prisoners had no equipment to cook. As a result, many prisoners suffered from diseases associated with chronic malnutrition, such as dysentery, diarrhea, and scurvy, and there were many deaths from typhoid, tuberculosis, pneumonia, and influenza. All prisoners were required to do forced labor, mainly building roads, railways, and harbors, which was typically backbreaking and accompanied by beatings. Rape was commonplace, and in some camps there were nightly roundups of women to abuse. Among the whites who had unlimited power over them were victims of previous Herero raids and soldiers who had been on the front lines.

Around half of the prisoners died, although death rates varied widely between camps. Some skulls and other body parts of the dead were taken to Germany, where they were studied to provide pseudoscientific "proof" of the racial inferiority of Africans. Although the German military was concerned with the pragmatic negative consequences of the high death rate, the civilian government rejected numerous attempts to improve conditions. Furthermore, it was the civilian government, not the military, that insisted on the continued imprisonment of those who could not work and who posed no threat. Deputy governor Hans Tecklenburg said that there were no innocent prisoners and the suffering would teach Herero a much-needed lesson. While he considered the losses regrettable, he believed that the Hereros' high fertility rate would restore their numbers over time. The closure of the camps was proclaimed on the kaiser's birthday, 27 January 1908.

== Aftermath ==
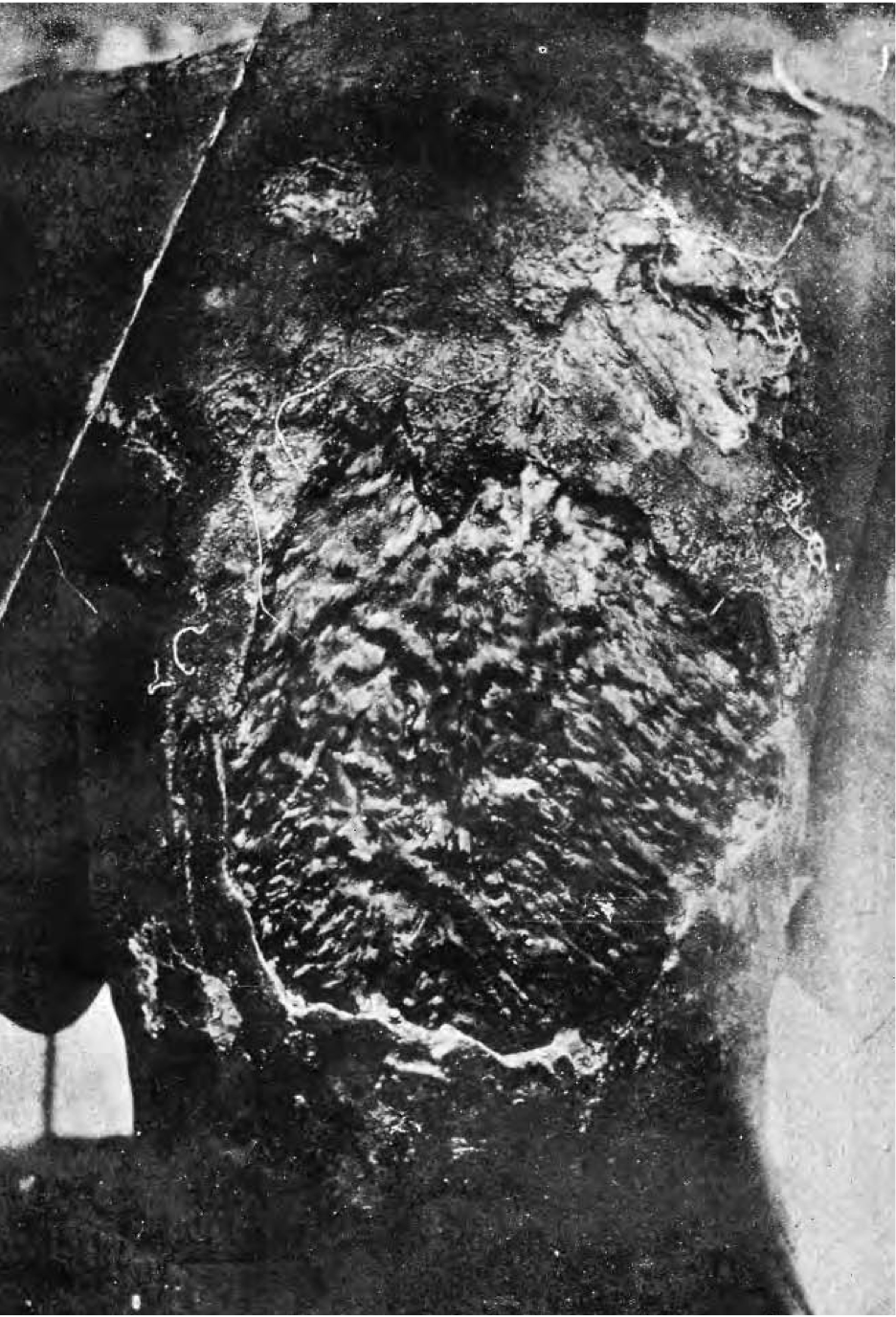
Flogging of a native woman by her employer. She and another woman died from their injuries; the employer was sentenced to four months in jail.

The German official history of the war reported that "the Herero ceased to exist as a tribe", having lost all their cattle, land, leaders, and structure. Between 40,000 and 80,000 Herero (80 percent of their prewar population) and 10,000 Nama (half of their prewar population) had died. Around 1,000, including Samuel Maharero, fled to Bechuanaland and around the same number to the Ovambo kingdoms. A few Herero still lived as fugitives. Some Nama attempted to avoid forced labor by fleeing to the Cape Colony, but those caught by the authorities were returned to Namibia where most were executed. According to census figures, there were around 15,000 Herero and 10,000 Nama living in Namibia in the early 1910s. The problem of impunity for crimes against Africans and extrajudicial violence by settlers was only exacerbated by the war. Forced labor was not abolished by the dismantlement of the concentration camps, as the survivors were dispersed to various farms and ranches to work for German farmers.

All Herero land was confiscated by the state and largely sold to colonists. To implement its vision where Germans would dominate and indigenous people would be a subjugated labor force, the colony passed wide-ranging racist laws in 1907. All Herero were banned from owning cattle or land; all of them had to be registered with the government with their residence and employer. They were required to carry a metal disc with a number embossed for tracking. Another ordinance forbade more than ten Herero families from living on each employer's property. Germans and natives were forbidden from marrying. The laws were not fully enforced due to the weakness of the colonial administration. Some Herero illegally absconded from one employer to work for another; others deserted to live as fugitives. Although flogging natives was legal, white employers often were illegally violent against their employees as well, and such crimes were overlooked by the culture of racial solidarity in the justice system. In 1915, German South West Africa was invaded by South Africa, which led to open defiance of the racist laws; many Herero returned to living more traditional lifestyles, often squatting on vacant land.

Maharero died in exile, but his funeral on 26 August 1923 was the first mass gathering of Herero since the war and is celebrated annually by Herero into the twenty-first century. German commemoration of their victory in the war was held annually by the German Namibian community until 2003, when it was banned by the Namibian government.

=== South African rule ===
The earlier genocide was investigated by the British authorities as a justification to keep the territory for themselves. Published in 1918, the Blue Book contained a detailed record of the genocide and became instrumental in the stereotype of violent German colonizers that prevailed in the ensuing decades. After the German revolution, Germany's new government published a White Book, which mainly argued that since similar atrocities had occurred in the British Empire, the genocide was no reason to strip Germany of its colonies. Although the White Book was not accurate in portraying the relative scale of German and British atrocities, its argument that the Herero uprising was the natural reaction of indigenous people under settler colonialism is the predominant view among historians today. In 1926, Britain recalled and destroyed copies of the Blue Book as part of a rapprochement with Germany, indicative of the fact that any concern for the victims of colonial violence was political rather than humanitarian. South Africa received a League of Nations mandate over South West Africa in December 1920.

During the period of South African rule, the memory of the genocide was repeatedly invoked by Herero representatives to challenge ongoing colonialism and apartheid rule. During the apartheid era, the previous German settler colonialism paved the way for ongoing white minority rule. Land dispossession continued as Afrikaans farmers were granted land in Namibia and the Black Namibian population was concentrated into Bantustans. After Namibia gained independence in 1990, the country was left with a highly unequal and racialized distribution of land. Land reform was decoupled from historical losses and instead was designed to benefit the support base of the ruling party. Dissatisfied Nama people formed the Landless People's Movement. Although it is not closely related to income inequality in Namibia, the land issue is identified by Herero and Nama representatives as the most important consequence of the genocide.

=== Historiography ===
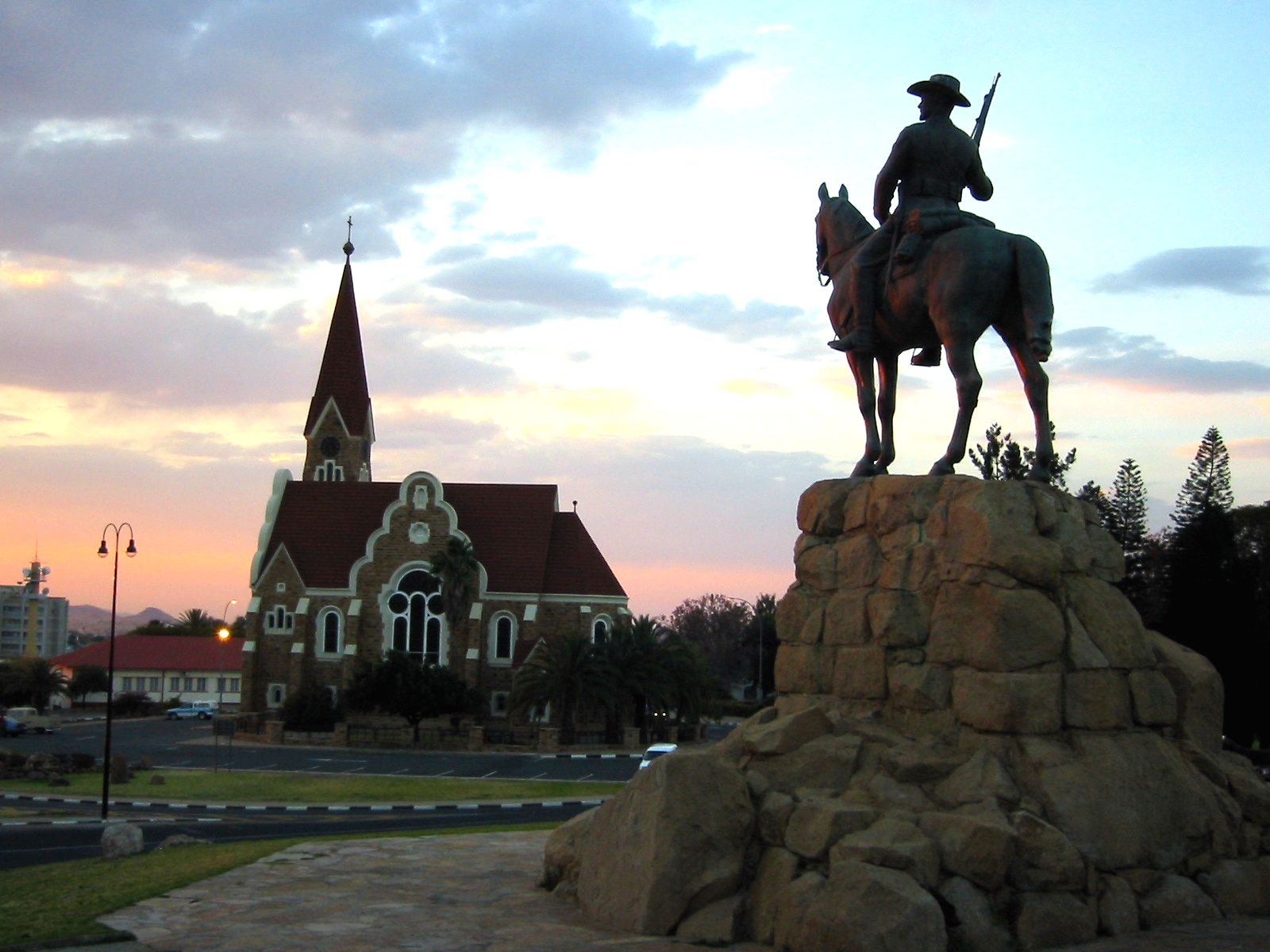
The Rider Statue in Windhoek was erected in honor of German perpetrators, but due to controversy, it has been moved multiple times and dethroned.

The official German history of the war, as well as published accounts by settlers and soldiers, celebrated the quelling of the Herero uprising. It was one of the only colonial genocides primarily carried out by regular military forces. Horst Drechsler, working in East Germany, authored the first comprehensive study of German colonialism in Namibia in the 1960s and he was the first historian to argue that the colonists committed genocide. Although Drechsler vilified German imperialism, more recent studies have often placed the blame on specific actors, such as Trotha or the kaiser. While historians writing according to scholarly norms do not dispute that a genocide took place, there is also a cottage industry of nostalgia-focused books written by German Namibians that posit that colonial atrocities are exaggerated to fabricate German guilt and extract reparations. Such denialist positions are common among German Namibians.

In Germany, the debate about the nature of the relationship between racial segregation and genocide in Namibia and the debate about the link between genocide in Namibia and the Holocaust erupted in the 2000s and has become acrimonious. Proponents of a postcolonial approach cite striking similarities in both the ideological justifications and tactics of German colonial rule in Namibia and Eastern Europe. On the other hand, criticism of a close link between the two genocides has suggested that it is a reductive approach that revives the discredited Sonderweg thesis of German history, while obscuring connections to other colonial regimes.

=== Reparations ===
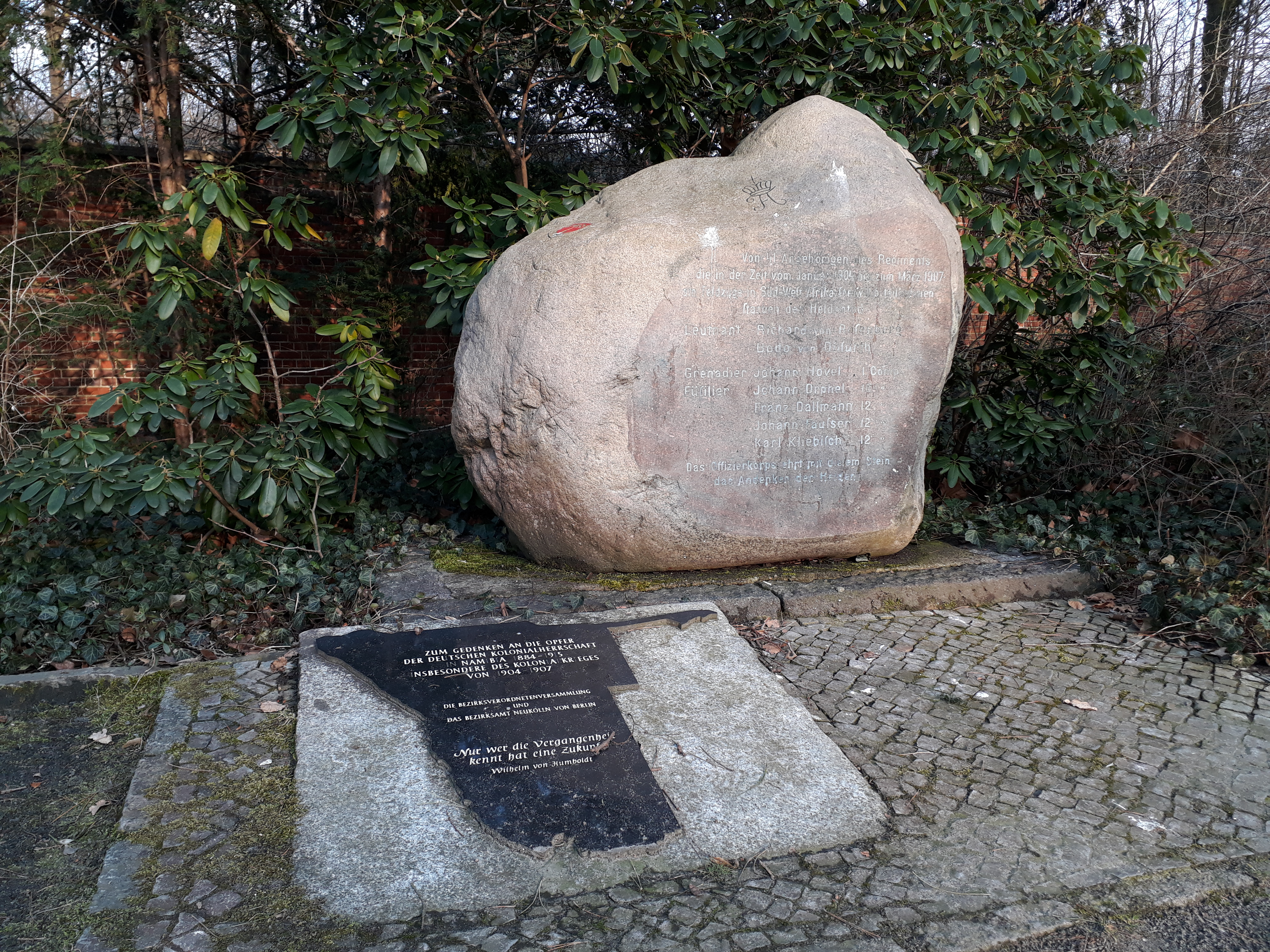
In Berlin, a memorial stone to German soldiers who died in the war was updated with a plaque acknowledging Herero and Nama victims (bottom left)

For 20 years after Namibia became independent, the Namibian government ignored the issue while Herero and Nama groups pursued reparations, including by filing an unsuccessful lawsuit in the United States under the Alien Tort Act, requesting punitive damages as well as the "value of the lands, cattle and other properties confiscated and taken from the Ovaherero and Nama people". In 2015, the German government acknowledged that a genocide had been committed in Namibia. Negotiations between the German and Namibian governments led to a deal in 2021 in which the German government agreed to contribute 1.1 billion euros (USD$1.3 billion) in the form of ex gratia development aid, while rejecting any legal responsibility for the genocide.

The deal was vocally rejected by most of the organizations representing Herero and Nama people, who had demanded their own right to negotiate directly with Germany over any settlement. In 2023, the Landless People's Movement and traditional leaders from the Herero and Nama communities sued in Namibian court to nullify the National Assembly's resolution of approval for the settlement. Although favorably contrasting the deal with more limited British and Dutch efforts at confronting past colonial crimes, German sociologist Henning Melber refers to the joint German–Namibian statement as "a soft version of denialism" that "offers no true reconciliation". International law expert Matthias Goldmann suggested that the deal may not have been as selfless as it initially appears, while it "seemingly confirms [Germany's] civilizational superiority".

=== In popular culture ===
The genocide has featured in a number of films, including both dramas and documentaries. The topic has gained especial popular attention in the 2010s and 2020s, corresponding with developments concerning genocide reparations.

Morenga is a 1985 West German drama that focusses on Jacob Moregna's role in the Nama and Herero uprising, making it one of the earliest German thematizations of German colonialism and the genocide. Measures of Men, a 2023 German drama film, is a later fictional retelling that follows a German ethnologist in Namibia during the genocide. Like its predecessor, the film's portrayal of the genocide has been subject to debate, especially its choice of main character and potential whitewashing of colonial atrocities.

Turning to documentary, Skulls, of my People is a 2016 South African film concerning Nama and Herero efforts to have human skulls collected by colonial troops and sent to Germany during the genocide returned to Namibia for burial. Sorry for the Genocide is a 2026 Namibian-, Botswanan-, and German-produced documentary that also explores the possibility for justice and reconciliation, featuring the descendants of Nama and Herero survivors as well as Germans from various walks of life. Continuing in this vein, Herero is a Namibian and US-American documentary film currently undergoing production, anticipated to be released in 2027. It focusses on Barnabas “Veraa” Katuuo, a Herero activist at the center of the landmark lawsuit demanding reparations from Germany for the genocide.
