= Herero uprising =

Wars in South West Africa, 1904–1908

Herero and Nama War
- Part of the Scramble for Africa
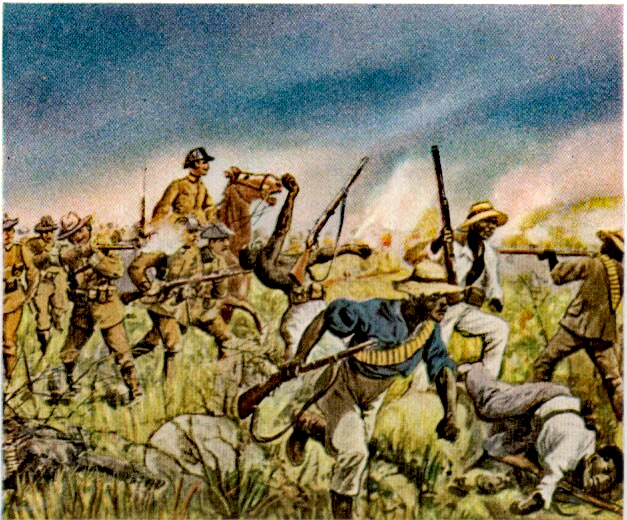
- German troops in combat with the Herero in a painting by Richard Knötel.
Date	1904–1908
Location	German South West Africa
Result	German victory, systematic extermination of native peoples

Belligerents
German Empire: German South West Africa	Herero, Nama, and other Namibians

Commanders and leaders
(German Empire) Theodor Leutwein (German Empire) Lothar von Trotha	Samuel Maharero; Hendrik Witbooi †

Strength
Initial strength: ~2,000	Herero: 10,000

Casualties and losses
KIA: 676; MIA: 76; WIA: 907; Died from disease: 689; Civilians: 100	65,000–70,000 including civilians

The Herero and Nama War is the collective term for a series of interlinked, anti-colonial armed struggles by native peoples in German South West Africa (present-day Namibia), mainly the Herero and Nama people, against the German Empire. The overall conflict took place between 1904 and 1908, and included the Herero uprising and the Second Nama Rebellion.

== Names ==
The 1904–1908 conflict has received numerous different names, with Herero and Nama War being a popular choice, including the variant war against the Ovaherero and Nama. The alternatives Namibian-German War or Namibian War had gained popularity by the 2020s, emphasizing the anti-colonial and inter-ethnic character of the conflict. As part of the debate on Namibian genocide reparations, the Scientific Services of the German Bundestag released a 2016 paper where the overall conflict was dubbed Rebellion by the Ethnic Groups of the Herero and Nama in German Southwest Africa; this naming was strongly criticized by historian Harald Kleinschmidt who regarded it as "discriminatory" and based on German colonial literature. (Note: According to Kleinschmidt, the conflict's description as "rebellion" characterized it as "seemingly illegitimate" struggle, while the use of the term "ethnic groups" in the paper was "denying statehood, sovereignty and subjecthood under international law" to the Herero and Nama.)

Instead of giving the entire war one name, however, researchers have often focused on individual sections or phases of the fighting and given those individual names. As such, the 1904–1908 conflict has been subdivided into the Herero uprising (1904–1907), alternatively known as Herero Revolt, Revolt of the Hereros, Herero War, or the Ovaherero-German War; and the Second Nama Rebellion (1904–1908) or Nama-German War.

== Background ==
=== Pre-colonial South-West Africa ===
Before colonization, the most populous groups in Namibia were the Herero in the central and southern regions, the Nama in the south, and the Ovambo in the north. The Ovambo were agriculturists as their lands had access to the waterways of the Etosha Pan, whereas the other native peoples were mainly semi-nomadic cattle-raisers. By the 19th century, the Herero were transitioning into a form of "nomadic feudalism", with a greater division of wealth and a political-religious elite which included the chiefs of the around 20 oruzo (paternal derivation groups). The Namibian Nama were traditionally split into eight clans since the 18th century, namely the Red Nation, Fransman Nama, Swartbooi Nama, Groot Doden, Veldschoendragers, Keetmanshoop Nama, Bondelswarts, and Topnaars. In the early 19th century, the Oorlam Nama also migrated into Namibia, adding five more clans, namely the Witboois, Amraal, Bereseba, Bethanie, and the Afrikaners. The Oorlam clans were partially descended from European settlers in South Africa. Both the Herero and Nama adapted some aspects of warfare from the South African Boers, including horse-mounted guerrilla warfare. The Oorlam Nama were particularly acquainted with European ways due to having lived around Boer settlements before their migration to Namibia. In contrast, the Ovambo discouraged most contacts with European explorers and traders due to their strong focus on their inherited warrior traditions.

Smaller ethnic groups included the San, Damara, and Basters. The San were largely hunters and gatherers and weaker than the other native peoples. The Damaras were largely "serfs" or slaves of Herero and Nama, while the free Damaras existed as hunters and gatherers in the local mountains. The Basters were descended from "legally recognized and religiously consecrated unions" of Dutch men and Nama women; they were proud of their European heritage and spoke Dutch.

From 1830, the later Namibia became engulfed in warfare between the different ethnic groups and clans due to influx of migrants from other regions, the spread of European firearms by trade, and scarcity of resources due to droughts. A major conflict erupted when Herero intruded into traditional Nama lands on the search for new pastures in 1830, whereupon the Nama rallied under the leadership of Jonker Afrikaner to push them back. The resulting fighting intermittently lasted until 1858, with Jonker Afrikaner temporarily dominating much of Namibia, while the Herero suffered such heavy losses that European Christian missionaries prematurely claimed that the "Herero race has so far as we know ceased to exist". Under the pressure of Christian missionaries and many Nama –who had grown wary of his power– Jonker Afrikaner was forced into signing the peace treaty of Hoachanas in 1858. As part of this treaty, the Herero acknowledged the Nama as overlords.

After Jonker Afrikaner died in 1861, his Nama coalition fell apart. As Swedish trader Charles Andersson had also sold large numbers of guns to the Herero, the latter exploited the Nama's weakness by launching a new conflict which became known as the "Herero War of Freedom". At the time, local white residents began petitioning both the Cape Colony and North German Confederation to intervene to bring the Nama-Herero conflicts to an end, but these requests were ignored. Regardless, historian Jon Bridgman argued that these petitions set "a dangerous precedent" for things to come. The war ultimately concluded with the treaty of Okahandja in 1870, with the Herero regaining their independence.

From 1870, Herero chief Samuel Maharero became the predominant figure in Namibia, being called upon to mediate in disputes by Herero, Nama, and Europeans alike. However, Maharero regarded his position as tenuous and continued to view the Nama as potential enemies; he thus requested the Cape Colony to send a commissioner to secure the peace and, by extension, his own position. As a result of Maharero's closeness to commissioner William Coates Palgrave, the Nama were ultimately unwilling to submit to the Palgrave Commission. The peace process collapsed in 1880, when a new war broke out over a border incident and Palgrave withdrew from the region. The renewed conflict was economically ruinous to local European traders.

=== German colonization ===
In the early 1880s, the German statesman Otto von Bismarck, reversing his previous rejection of colonial acquisitions, decided on a policy of imperial expansion. In 1882 Bismarck gave permission to Adolf Lüderitz to obtain lands which Germany would bring within its "protection", under the conditions that a port was established within the territories taken and that there was "clear title" to the land. Lüderitz bought the title to Angra Pequena (later renamed Lüderitz Bay) from Joseph Fredericks, a chief of the Oorlam people, in exchange for 200 rifles, 2,500 German marks, and some lead toy soldiers, and established a port there. Clarification of Germany's title among the European powers took some time, as the British demurred in response to a German request to clarify the boundaries of their title, however in April 1884 Bismarck instructed the German consul in declare "Lüderitzland" (as Lüderitz's holding in South-West Africa had become known) as under the "protection" of the German Reich. Lüderitz steadily spread Germany's influence throughout the South-West African territory until by 1885 only one tribe within it – the Witboois – had not concluded some kind of arrangement with Germany.

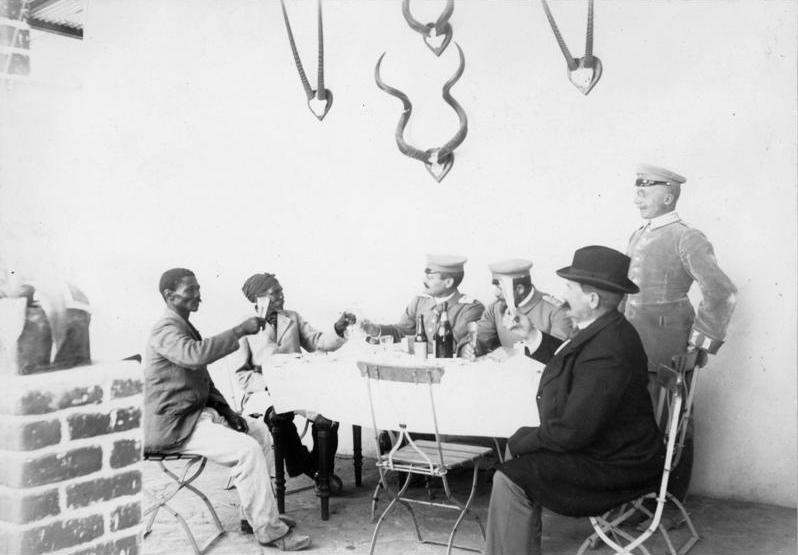
Theodor Leutwein toasting Hendrik Witbooi in 1896

The continued resistance of the Witboois, led by Hendrik Witbooi, culminated in an armed conflict in 1893, as the Germans opted to violently force them into submission. This campaign, also known as the "First Nama Rebellion", demonstrated the Nama's effective use of guerrilla warfare and dragged on until 1904. It was concluded when the new German governor, Theodor Leutwein, managed to corner the Witboois in the Naukluft Mountains where they agreed to surrender. The German-Witbooi treaty allowed the Witbooi Nama to remain under arms as German allies and auxiliaries. Over the next years, Leutwein launched disarmament and punitive operations to subjugate native groups, including the Mbandjeru and Khaua Nama, the Zwartboois, the Grootfontein "mixed-bloods", and some Nama Afrikaners.

Whilst Rhenish missionaries, traders, and other Europeans had been present in the territory since the 1830s, it was only with the advent of Germany's claim to South-West Africa that German settlement of the territory began in earnest. By 1903 there were roughly 4,682 European settlers in the protectorate of whom nearly 3,000 were Germans, most of them in the towns of Lüderitz, Swakopmund, and Windhoek. The advent of large-scale German settlement also brought about changes in the treatment of the native Herero and Nama peoples by Europeans, with native people facing increased legal discrimination and expropriation of land for the use of European settlers. The large majority of these settlers were men, as just 700 white women lived in the colony before the rebellion. This caused many male settlers to take native concubines, often forcefully, or just rape local women. The impact of the German colonization was uneven, with the Herero territories being heavily affected, whereas the Ovambo "remained essentially unconquered". The fort Namutoni effectively marked the northern border of German control, beyond which the Ovambo remained largely self-governing.

Traditional Herero society and political-religious systems disintegrated during the German rule. The new commercial pressures encouraged many Herero to sell their cattle, forcing large numbers to become cattle ranchers who worked for Germans or richer Herero. Samuel Maharero was officially appointed Herero paramount chief by the Germans, though this position had not existed before colonization and Maharero could not fulfill the religious duties of the chiefdom due to being Christian. There existed no measures for Maharero, let alone other chiefs, to enforce their decision across the entire Herero people; at best, chiefs like Maharero acted as primus inter pares. Regardless of any formal appointments, the power of all Herero chiefs largely depended on their wealth and had to be shared with all other cattle owners. Furthermore, the Herero were subdivided into nine large tribes by 1903. The Okahandja Herero under Maharero's personal leadership were the largest tribe, bordered to the west by the Omaruru Herero of Chief Manasse and the Otijimbingwe Herero under Chief Zacharias. Around Mount Waterberg lived Chief Kambazeni's tribe, while the east was split into smaller tribes under Chiefs Nikodemus, Tjetjo, Mambo, Ombondju, and Kakimena.

== Prelude ==
=== Herero grievances ===
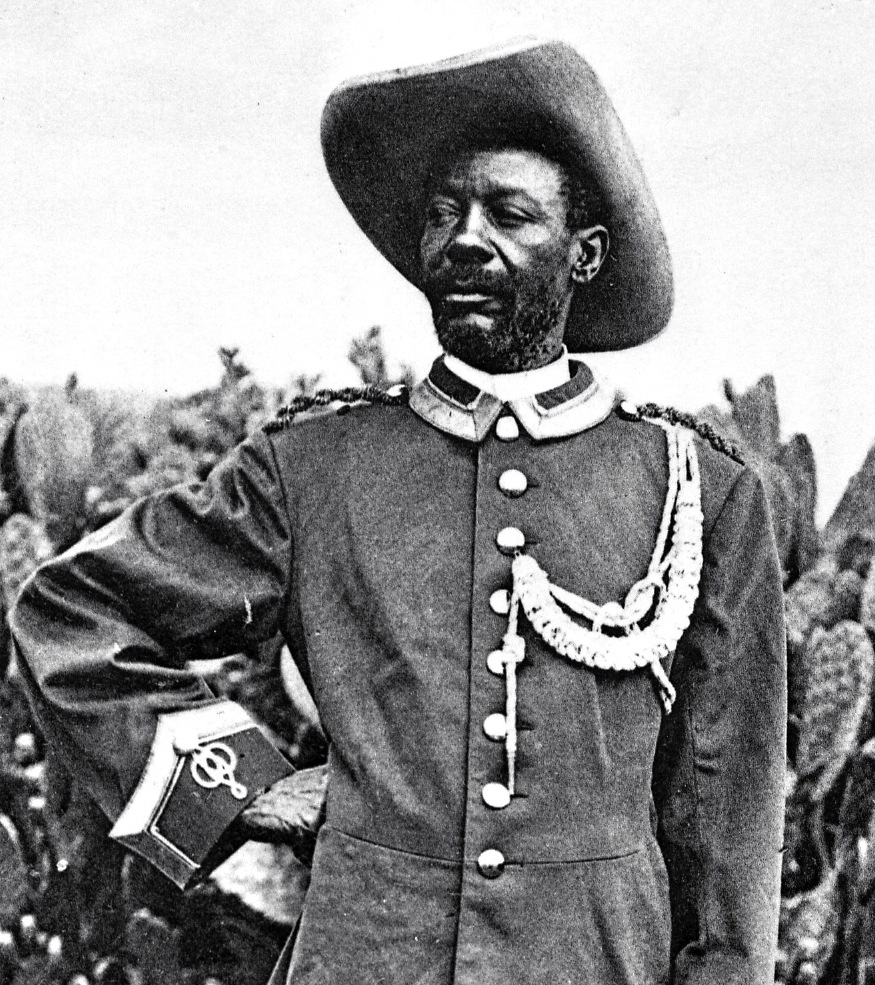
Samuel Maharero, Herero paramount chief

The Herero's key grievance and the structural condition which led to the outbreak of the war was the existence of an unfair judicial system. If a white person was killed, multiple Africans would be executed as punishment. In contrast, settlers could kill natives with effective impunity because African lives were deemed worthless, so the judicial system would find a way to exonerate or issue a minimal punishment. The result was widespread murder and rape against Africans by settlers, which weakened the colonial administration's monopoly on violence and overall authority. The victims were powerless to get redress for these crimes because police and soldiers were among the perpetrators. African witnesses were generally deemed to be unreliable by German courts, often contributing to the courts exonerating settlers accused of wrongdoings. Several settlers abused the lopsided judicial system, becoming serial violators. On the other side, Germans who opposed the abuses were ostracized by settlers and even sanctioned by the courts as well as colonial authorities. German employers were legally allowed to beat, whip, and flog indigenous employees. Even chiefs were subject to corporal punishments. According to historian Horst Drechsler, most "Germans described the Africans as baboons and treated them accordingly". (Note: Racist and contemptuous attitudes toward the native population of Namibia was widespread in German society, both among settlers as well as in Germany itself. For instance, the sexual relationships between native women and German settlers –including rape– were mainly criticized from a racialist viewpoint and regarded as "Verkafferung", a form of going native.) Many settlers regarded the native Africans as either potential cheap labor or obstacles to be eliminated.

The influence of the struggle over land in regards to the Herero uprising remains disputed among researchers. Some studies have emphasized struggle over land as the central cause of the uprising, but the colonist population was not quickly increasing in 1903 and other research has shown that the land question was not urgent. (Note: Conversely, historian Horst Drechsler argued that the claim about the land question being marginal to the Herero uprising originated in pro-settler circles. For instance, a May 1904 motion by the Berlin branch of the Deutsche Kolonialgesellschaft declared that "the allegation now being circulated in Germany that the Herero have staged their rebellion because their livelihood is in jeopardy is false". Similarly, Karl Dove categorically denied the importance of land grievances to the revolt.) In the period before the rebellion, Leutwein had begun to implement a strategy to concentrate indigenous people on reserves. The creation of the reserves, alongside a statute limiting contracts in July 1903, were supposed to at least partially remedy abuses against the Herero. Instead, the reserves openly showcased how little land the Herero still held, while the statute led traders to further pressure natives to repay debts. These measures thus led to even greater grievances among the Herero. The building of the Otavi railway resulted in further seizure of land in the southern territories of the Herero, and the railway's financier –the Otavigesellschaft– openly demanded that the Herero cede not just land for a further expansion of the line itself but also all water rights and a 20 kilometres (12 mi) stretch along the tracks. Leutwein negotiated with Samuel Maharero over these demands until the chief partially yielded. Maharero agreed to relinquish land for the railway's tracks free of charge, but no additional territory. The Herero were aware that the expansion of the railway might lead to an influx of more settlers into their areas.

In general, the settler population as well as German authorities ignored the provisions of the protection treaty with the Herero, with Leutwein noting that the majority of the local whites were even ignorant of the treaty's existence. The Herero complained that the Germans were violating their customs and breaking the treaty; realizing that the old promises were ignored, many Herero also no longer felt bound by the agreement by 1904.

=== Start of the Bondelswarts uprising ===
In 1903, a rebellion by the Bondelswarts, a Nama clan, erupted in the southeastern Namibia. The Bondelswarts had generally cooperated with colonial authorities, as they deemed the rival Witbooi clan a greater threat than the Germans. Tensions greatly increased when local German authorities ordered the Bondelswarts to register their guns in preparation of a disarmament drive, but they refused to comply. Amid local disputes, Lieutenant Walter Jobst, Warmbad district chief, shot the Bondelswarts chief Christian and was then killed by the chief's followers. (Note: According to Bridgeman, Jobst had entered the Bondelswarts camp to enforce the gun registration, resulting in a shootout and the death of Chief Willem Christian. According to Kössler, Jobst violently intervened in a dispute over a supposedly stolen goat and murdered Chief Jan Abram Christiaan during this dispute.)

Governor Leutwein responded by gradually sending the majority of the colony's Schutztruppe garrison to punish the Bondelswarts. A short and fierce war erupted. The Bondelswarts engaged in hit-and-run attacks and began cooperating with bands of robbers in the Karras Hills, with the Germans unable to inflict a defeat on them. On 25 December 1903, Captain Franke's Second Field Company was also sent from Omaruru to the far south of the colony to quell the Bondelswarts' rebellion. Eventually, Leutwein personally ventured south to take command of the campaign. This left the north stripped of troops—there were only 770 German soldiers in the entire colony. At this point, several local clans still offered support to the Germans; for instance, Hendrik Witbooi's clan fought alongside the Schutztruppe against the Bondelswarts.

The Bondelswarts were still fighting by early 1904, ensuring that most of the German colonial troops were not present in central Namibia when the Herero uprising broke out.

== Rebellion ==
=== Herero plans ===
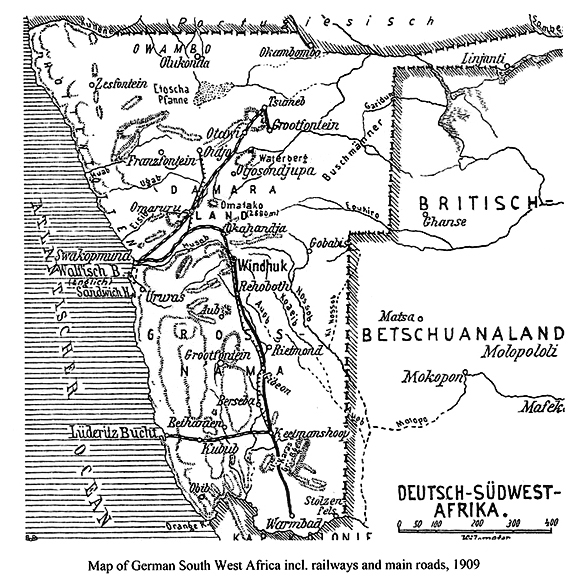
German South West Africa in 1904

In response to their grievances, several Herero leaders including Samuel Maharero began to plan an anti-German uprising. (Note: The Germans initially believed that Samuel Maharero's nephew Assa Riarua had masterminded the revolt, based on the faulty assumption that the Maharero could only have been "forced" into an open anti-German resistance by others.) The first planning may have taken place at a series of meetings by Herero headmen at Okahandja in April and May of 1903. The Herero uprising was an act of desperation to retake their land, cattle, and political independence; as well as exact revenge. Matthias Häussler writes that the war was limited in means but not ends; the Herero wanted the permanent end of German colonization. Similarly, Bridgman described the revolt as being aimed at the removal of the Germans from South West Africa or at least the Herero lands. To which extent the natives believed that a victory over the Germans would be possible is debated among historians. Bridgeman argued that younger Herero and Nama deemed it possible to push the Germans out of Namibia, and pressured their potentially more "defeatist" chiefs to take action. Maharero attempted to forge a wider coalition within Namibia. He secretly contacted the Ovambo in the north, encouraging them to ally with the Herero.

The Herero planned to strike at German outposts, garrisons and the transportation and communication system, seeking to cripple the colonial military control in their territories. Even more important to the insurgents was the removal of all German settlers from their lands. The Herero reasoned that the German colonial government existed to the settlers' benefit, so the latter's removal might also trigger an exodus of the colonial forces from the region. The settlers were also targeted because they mainly lived on isolated, indefensible farms with considerable wealth in cattle. At the same time, Maharero sought to avoid massacres of the settlers by the Herero and worked toward preventing an "orgy of wanton killing" upon the uprising's start. According to Bridgeman, Maharero's calls for restraint were partially motivated by moral concerns, including his Christian faith, but also political calculations: By not engaging in unrestricted violence, he could present the Herero as "civilized" and potential allies to other regional people and powers, including the British. To this end, Maharero also ordered his followers to not attack British citizens, Boers, Nama, Basters, and Berg Darama, thereby seeking to avoid the enmity of these peoples and allowing for the possibility of allying with them in the future.

The removal of most German troops from their lands due to the Bondelswarts rebellion provided the Herero with a favorable strategic situation, contributing to the rebel leaders triggering their rising in January 1904. Furthermore, the absence of the governor and most security forces encouraged violent settlers and Schutztruppe soldiers to increase their abuses of the Herero. Some settlers hoped to provoke violence by the natives, believing that a reaction by the natives could be used to justify further repression. Rumors began to circulate, alleging that Leutwein and some of his troops had been killed by the Bondelswarts or had been interned by the British after crossing the border. Maharero later claimed that settlers and some Schutztruppe officers spread these rumors, as Leutwein was still a trusted figure for the Herero whom more radical Germans viewed as being too lenient toward the natives. The governor's alleged removal further encouraged open resistance.

Despite signs of increased Herero unrest in the days leading up to the uprising's planned start, few Germans suspected anything more substantial than a "minor disturbance". Gustav Duft, the German civilian official left in charge in the Herero territories during Leutwein's absence, did grow alarmed, and traveled to Okahandja on 11 January. Duft intended to talk to the Herero chiefs encamped in the area, hoping to deescalate.

=== Early Herero rebellion ===
The Herero clans seized the opportunity to rebel on 12 January 1904. They mobilized about 8,000 warriors, many armed with guns but others possessing only spears. (Note: The extent to which the Herero had access to guns is disputed. Leutwein claimed that just half of the Herero rebels were armed with guns, but the editors of the German official history disagreed and estimated a much higher number. According to Bridgman, the exact number of guns was less important than the rebels' lack of ammunition.) The uprising caught the colonists by surprise and saw a stunning success at first: farms and businesses were plundered, and 123 150, or as many as 160 Germans were killed. Most of those killed were farmers and traders; German soldiers were only one-tenth of the dead. The rebels generally spared women, children, missionaries, and white people who were not German. (Note: Only three German women and seven Boer men were killed.) Individual attacks were planned to take advantage of deception and surprise, and the Herero seized weapons and supplies. The Herero killed men, took anything useful, razed buildings, and attempted to destroy everything else, in an attempt to destroy colonists' economic existence and force them to depart Namibia forever. The occurrence of mutilation, particularly castration, was in revenge for the sexual violence that had previously been visited on Herero women. For the most part, the Herero warriors displayed considerable military discipline and restraint. Over the course of the uprising's first ten days, nearly all German farms in Herero territories were destroyed; most farmers survived, albeit without any possessions, and fled to the colonial capital Windhoek.

In contrast to the effective attacks on the settlers' farms, the Herero did not launch large-scale attacks on the German outposts and towns despite Maharero's commands to do so. Blockaded places included Windhoek, Omaruru, Otjimbingwe, Okahandja, Gobabis, and Outjo. In course of the uprising's first week, there were a few raids, but only "two or three minor outposts" were seriously threatened. No assaults were mounted against major forts or the poorly defended Windhoek. When facing organized defenses, the Herero warriors largely limited themselves to blockades and the destruction of railroad lines as well as telegraph lines. Historians have debated the reasons for the rebels' passivity in this regard; Bridgman reasoned that the Herero were culturally averse toward combat in towns and fortresses, while the German fortifications also served as genuine force-multipliers which remained very difficult for the natives to capture even under favorable conditions.

Samuel Maharero was also diplomatically active after the uprising's start. He sent letters to Kaptein Hermanus van Wyk of the Rehoboth Basters as well as Hendrik Witbooi, requesting their support. In his letter to Witbooi, Maharero expressed his desire for an inter-ethnic alliance, famously exclaiming Let us die fighting! Yet van Wyk and Witbooi initially refused to join any rebellion, and van Wyk turned the letters over to the Germans. Maharero may had hoped that the Nama and Basters could tie down the Germans in the south, but this came not to pass. In the north, the Ovambo actually launched attacks on German posts during the first days of the Herero revolt, but these failed. Afterward, the Ovambo largely did not involve themselves in the escalating conflict.

=== German reaction ===
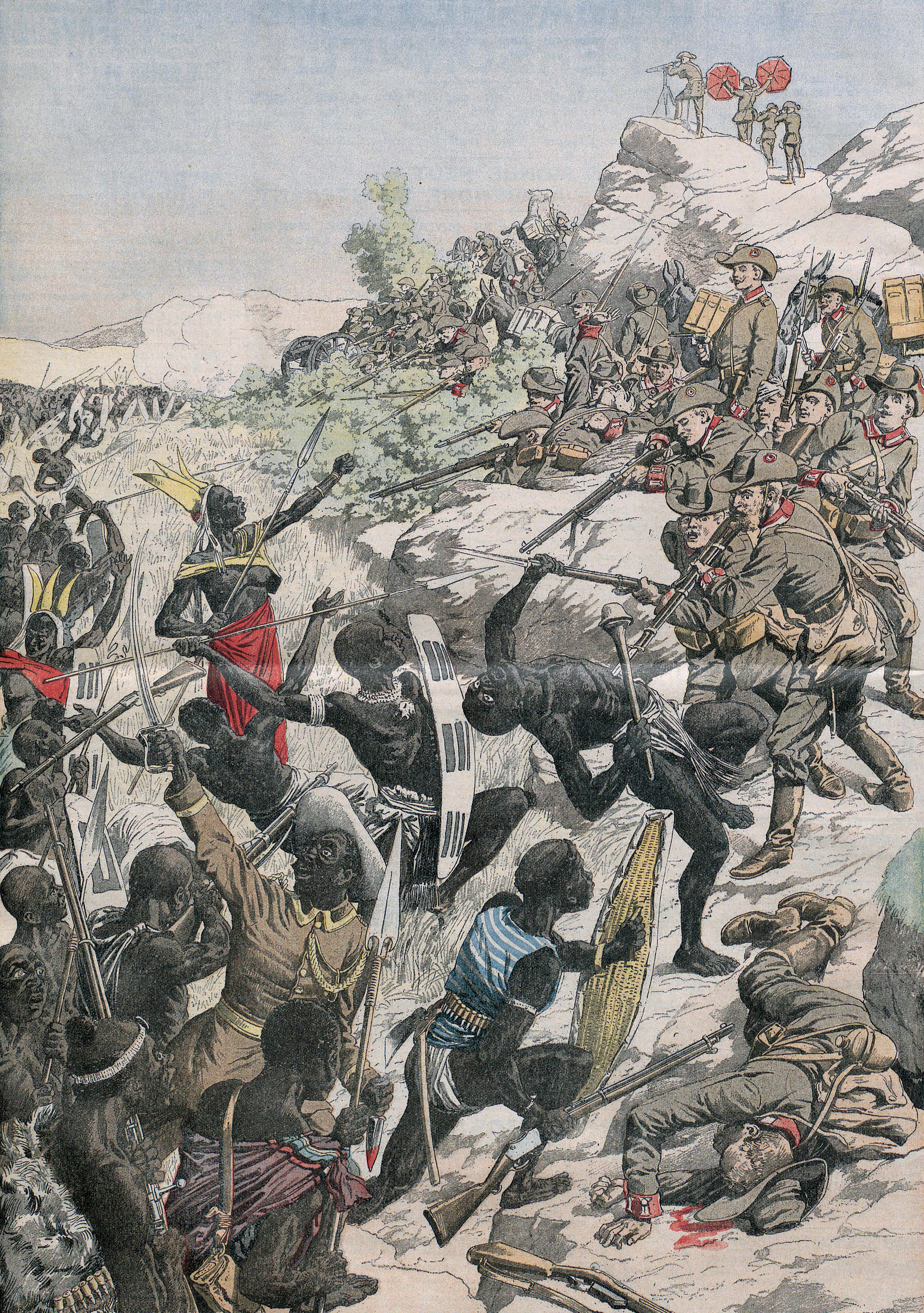
German garrison of Windhoek, besieged by the Herero, 1904

The Germans were largely surprised by the uprising. At the time, there were about 766 regular German soldiers on duty in the colony, supported by 120 Baster scouts and more than 120 Witbooi scouts. These were reinforced by 764 reservists and 400 untrained settler volunteers. Overall, there were about 2,000 pro-colonial troops available. Aside of the settlers who directly supported the colonial military, many settlers also armed themselves for self-defense, and even women reportedly began to carry guns. Though outnumbered, the colonial forces were better armed and organized than the native insurgents. Upon learning of the Herero's actions, Leutwein hastily initiated negotiations with the Bondelswarts and concluded a peace which provided for the clan's disarmament but was otherwise not favourable to the Germans; this allowed him to move his troops back north. When the colonial authorities called upon the Nama clans to provide auxiliaries in accordance with the old treaties, they obliged; about 100 Nama joined the anti-Herero operations, including several Witboois. The Basters also sided with the Germans and remained loyal to the colonial authorities throughout the entire conflict.

Among the German settler community, claims of native atrocities quickly circulated despite the great restraint displayed by the Herero rebels. Exaggerated and fabricated atrocity propaganda portraying Herero as animal-like sadists spread widely with newspapers such as the Kolonialblatt and Deutsch-Südwestafrikanische Zeitung playing a significant role in inciting violence.

News of the revolt reached the German mainland on 14 January; after initial shock, demands for vengeance were quickly voiced by German officials. German Chancellor Bernhard von Bülow addressed the Reichstag on 18 January, claiming that the rebellion had erupted "without apparent cause", declaring his intention to send an Imperial German Navy regiment as quick response force, and requesting a credit to pay for the deployment of 500 troops, six machine guns, and six artillery pieces during the next month. On 19 January, director of the Colonial Department Oscar Wilhelm Stübel provided more detailed information to the Reichstag, further admitting that the revolt could be motivated by a desire for independence by the Herero. Social Democratic Party leader August Bebel criticized the government's claims, arguing that the revolt had been evidently caused by the abuses committed by settlers and traders in South West Africa. Bebel called for a proper investigation of the revolt's origin.

Troops were sent from Germany to re-establish order but only dispersed the rebels, led by Chief Maharero. The Herero led a guerrilla campaign, conducting fast hit-and-run operations then melting back into the terrain they knew well, preventing the Germans from gaining an advantage with their modern artillery and machineguns. Leutwein sent desperate messages to Maharero in hopes of negotiating an end to the war. The Hereros, however, were emboldened by their success and had come to believe that, "the Germans were too cowardly to fight in the open," and rejected Leutwein's offers of peace. One missionary wrote, "One hears nothing but (Herero) talk of 'cleaning up,' 'executing,' 'shooting down to the last man,' 'no pardon,' etc." Soon after the rebellion began, German Emperor Wilhelm II replaced Leutwein with the notorious General Lothar von Trotha.

Some German authorities also began more serious efforts to investigate the rebellion's causes. The Reichstag demanded an official inquiry in March 1904, and this demand was reluctantly backed by Stübel. Chancellor Bülow forwarded the demand to Wilhelm II who promptly postponed any investigation indefinitely. In general, German imperialists showcased little genuine interest in the circumstances of the rebellion, instead viewing it as a good pretext to seize more control as well as territory in South West Africa. The uprising was broadly blamed on Herero "blood-thirstiness", "racial strife", the traders' practices, and Leutwein's allegedly too-lenient governing style. British influence was also used as a scapegoat, with Leutwein quickly joining those who claimed that British individuals had incited the Herero to rebel, seeking to deflect blame from himself. The ensuing anti-British campaign—including the arrest of British citizens in South West Africa—petered out once no evidence could be found. German missionaries were also blamed by officials and the pro-colonial press, alleging that the missionaries were somehow abetting the insurgents. Missionaries responded with an anonymous letter in the newspaper Der Reichsbote, clarifying that the rebellion was rooted in the mistreatment of Herero by settlers and officials. This further incited imperialists and colonial officials; the "shadow-boxing" between the missionaries and their critics in the press ultimately availed to little.

=== Fall ===
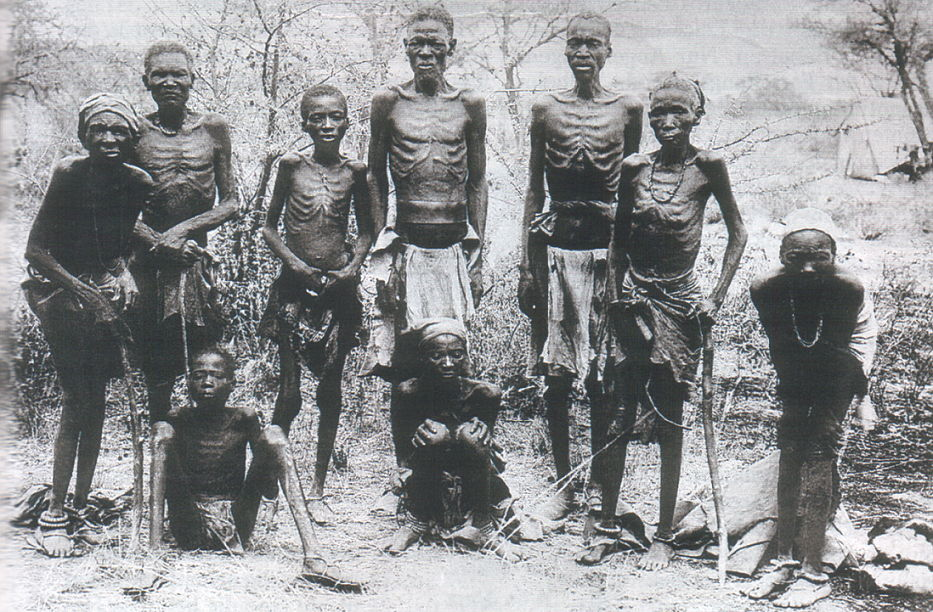
"Condition of Herero on surrender after having been driven into the desert"

A conclusive battle was fought on 11 August 1904, at the Battle of Waterberg in the Waterberg Mountains. Chief Maharero believed his six to one advantage over the Germans would allow him to win in a final showdown. The Germans had time to bring forward their artillery and heavy weapons. Both sides took heavy losses, but the Herero were scattered and defeated.

Trotha's troops defeated 3,000–5,000 Herero combatants at the Battle of Waterberg but were unable to encircle and annihilate the retreating survivors. The pursuing German forces prevented groups of Herero from breaking from the main body of the fleeing force and pushed them further into the desert. As exhausted Herero fell to the ground, unable to go on, German soldiers killed men, women, and children.

It took the Germans until 1908 to re-establish authority over the territory. By that time tens of thousands of Africans (estimates range from 34,000 to 110,000) had been either killed or died of thirst while fleeing. 65,000 of 80,000 Hereros and at least 10,000 of 20,000 Nama died as a result of the conflict.

== Aftermath ==
As a result of their loyalty during the conflict, the Basters were rewarded by the German government by being permitted to retain their lands and way of life until World War I.

In 1915, during World War I, South African forces occupied it in the so-called South West Africa Campaign, and SW Africa officially became a mandate of South Africa in 1920.

On 16 August 2004, 100 years after the war, the German government officially apologised for the atrocities. "We Germans accept our historic and moral responsibility and the guilt incurred by Germans at that time," said Heidemarie Wieczorek-Zeul, Germany's development aid minister. In addition, she admitted that the massacres were equivalent to genocide.

Not until 2015 did the German government admit that the massacres were equivalent to genocide and again apologised in 2016. The Herero are suing the German government in a class action lawsuit. In 2021, Germany announced that they would repay Namibia €1.1 billion.

Some notable fighters in Herero Wars are revered as the national heroes of Namibia.

== In literature ==
The Herero Wars and the massacres are both depicted in a chapter of the 1963 novel V. by Thomas Pynchon. The tragic story of the Herero and Nama Genocide also appears in Pynchon's 1973 novel Gravity's Rainbow.

The heavy toll of the Herero and Nama genocide on individual lives and the fabric of Herero culture is seen in the 2013 historical novel Mama Namibia by Mari Serebrov.

The war and the massacres are both significantly featured in The Glamour of Prospecting, a contemporary account by Frederick Cornell of his attempts to prospect for diamonds in the region. In the book, he describes his first-hand accounts of witnessing the concentration camp on Shark Island amongst other aspects of the conflict.

== See also ==
- Herero and Nama genocide
- National heroes of Namibia

== Bibliography ==
- Adhikari, Mohamed (2022). Destroying to Replace: Settler Genocides of Indigenous Peoples. Hackett Publishing. ISBN 978-1-64792-055-5.
- Alnæs, Kirsten (1989). "Living with the past: The Songs of the Herero in Botswana". Africa: Journal of the International African Institute. 59 (3). Cambridge University Press: 267–299. doi:10.2307/1160229. JSTOR 1160229. S2CID 143939978.
- Bridgman, Jon (1981). The Revolt of the Hereros. University of California Press. ISBN 978-0-520-04113-4.
- de Quesada, Alejandro (2013). Imperial German Colonial and Overseas Troops 1885–1918. Osprey Publishing. ISBN 978-1780961644.
- Dedering, Tilman (2024). "The Herero and Nama War in German South-West Africa (1904-1907) in newspaper reports". In Andreas Eckl; Matthias Häussler; Martha Akawa-Shikufa (eds.). An Unresolved Issue: Genocide in Colonial Namibia (PDF). Windhoek: Friedrich-Ebert-Stiftung. pp. 121–136. ISBN 978-99945-56-38-0.
- Drechsler, Horst (1980). "Let Us Die Fighting": The Struggle of the Herero and Nama against German Imperialism (1884–1915). Zed Press. ISBN 0905762479.
- Faber-Jonker, Leonor (2023). "'Rivers of Blood and Rivers of Money': The Herero and Nama Genocides in German Southwest Africa, 1904–1908". The Cambridge World History of Genocide. Cambridge University Press. ISBN 978-1-108-76548-0.
- Gaudi, Robert (2017). African Kaiser: General Paul Von Lettow-Vorbeck and the Great War in Africa, 1914–1918. Caliber. ISBN 978-1-84904-867-5 – via Google Books.
- Gann, Lewis H.; Duignan, Peter (1977). The Rulers of German Africa, 1884-1914. Stanford University Press. ISBN 978-0804709385.
- Häussler, Matthias (2021). The Herero Genocide: War, Emotion, and Extreme Violence in Colonial Namibia. Berghahn Books. ISBN 978-1-80073-024-3.
- Kleinschmidt, Harald (2024). "The Scientific Re-Presentation of Colonialist Propaganda. An analysis of the legal opinion by the Scientific Services of the Deutscher Bundestag relating to Namibian compensation claims". In Andreas Eckl; Matthias Häussler; Martha Akawa-Shikufa (eds.). An Unresolved Issue: Genocide in Colonial Namibia (PDF). Windhoek: Friedrich-Ebert-Stiftung. pp. 301–330. ISBN 978-99945-56-38-0.
- Kössler, Reinhart (2024). "The Nama-German War – an integral part of a complex trajectory of large-scale violence". In Andreas Eckl; Matthias Häussler; Martha Akawa-Shikufa (eds.). An Unresolved Issue: Genocide in Colonial Namibia (PDF). Windhoek: Friedrich-Ebert-Stiftung. pp. 51–68. ISBN 978-99945-56-38-0.
- Lindner, Ulrike (2011). Koloniale Begegnungen: Deutschland und Großbritannien als Imperialmächte in Afrika 1880-1914 (in German). Campus Verlag. ISBN 978-3593394855.
- Morlang, Thomas (2008). Askari und Fitafita. "Farbige" Söldner in den deutschen Kolonien (in German). Ch. Links Verlag. ISBN 978-3861534761.
- Zollmann, Jakob (2010). Koloniale Herrschaft und ihre Grenzen: Die Kolonialpolizei in Deutsch-Südwestafrika 1894 - 1915 (in German). Vandenhoeck & Ruprecht. ISBN 978-3525370186.
