= Isaak Witbooi =

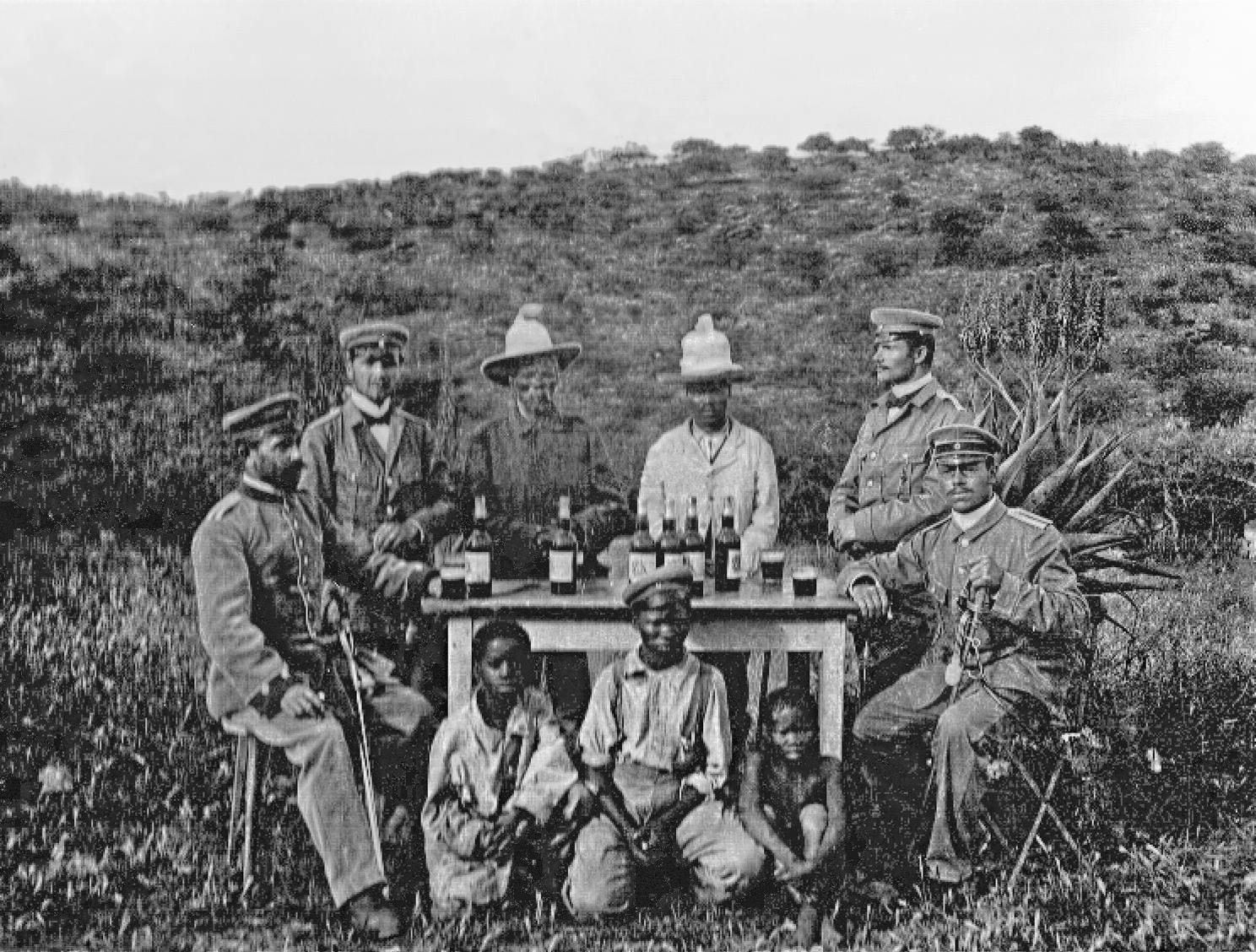
Hendrik Witbooi with his son Isaak Witbooi and German officers

Isaak Witbooi, Nama name: ǃNanseb ǂKharib ǃNansemab, (25 May 1865 – 16 October 1928) was the fourth Kaptein of the ǀKhowesin, a subtribe of the Oorlam, in Gibeon, South-West Africa (today's Namibia). When during the Herero Wars his father, Hendrik Witbooi, fell on 29 October 1905, he inherited the chieftaincy and continued fighting the German troops, but surrendered on 3 February 1906. The German colonial government formally abolished the traditional leadership structures and kept the ǀKhowesin including Isaak Witbooi detained in the North of Namibia, unable to return to Gibeon until the World War I surrender of local German troops to invading British-South African forces in 1915. At Gibeon, Isaak Witbooi succeeded in rebuilding the social organisation of the ǀKhowesin, despite being only recognised as "local headman" by the South African administration. He reigned until his death in 1928, when his brother David Witbooi succeeded him.
