= Curt von François =

German commissioner of German Southwest Africa (1852–1931)

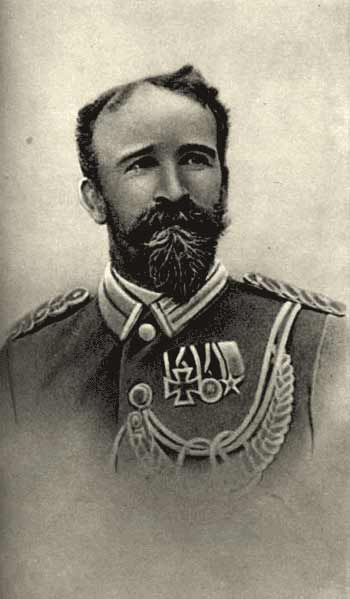
- François in Schutztruppe uniform, 1896

Governor of German South West Africa
- In office March 1891 – 15 March 1894
- Preceded by: Louis Nels (acting)
- Succeeded by: Theodor Leutwein

Personal details
- Born: 2 October 1852 Luxembourg, Grand Duchy of Luxembourg
- Died: 28 December 1931 (aged 79) Königs Wusterhausen, Germany
- Spouses: Amalia Gawaxas; Margarethe Meyer zu Bohmte
- Children: 5
- Relatives: Hermann von François (brother); Louise von François (aunt)

Curt Karl Bruno von François (2 October 1852 – 28 December 1931) was a German geographer, cartographer, Schutztruppe officer and commissioner of the imperial colonial army of the German Empire, particularly in German South West Africa (today's Namibia) where he was responsible on behalf of Kaiser for the foundation of the city of Windhoek on 18 October 1890 and the harbor of Swakopmund on 4 August 1892.

== Early life ==
François was born in Luxembourg of French Huguenot ancestry. He was the son of Prussian general Bruno von François, who was killed in the battle of Spicheren. Curt's younger brother Hermann von François (1856–1933) served as a general in World War I and was one of the key contributors to the German victory at the 1914 Battle of Tannenberg. The writer Louise von François was his aunt. Like his ancestors, young Curt von François joined the Prussian Cadet Corps. He served as a soldier in the Franco-Prussian War of 1870–71, during which his father was killed in action during the Battle of Spicheren on 6 August 1870, and was awarded the Iron Cross.

In 1883 he worked as a geographer on an exploratory expedition along the Kasai River in the Congo Basin under the leadership of Hermann Wissmann and two years later joined another expedition into the Congo led by George Grenfell. Back in Germany, he became a member of the German General Staff, and was elevated to the rank of Hauptmann (Captain). In 1887 he was stationed as a research officer in German West Africa. On behalf of the Foreign Office, he explored Togoland and the trade route to Salaga up to the Mossi territory in the north.

=== South West Africa ===
In 1883, the German merchant Adolf Lüderitz had purchased the coastal area of Angra Pequena, following negotiations with a local African chief. He called this coastal region of southwestern Africa Lüderitz. Fearing that the British were planning to declare the area a protectorate, Lüderitz advised the German chancellor Otto von Bismarck to claim it, which he did at the Berlin Conference of 1884. On 7 October the colony of German South West Africa was established under Reichskommissar governor Gustav Nachtigal. However, the German authorities met with fierce resistance by the local Herero people. When in 1888 their officials were forcibly expelled from Okahandja, the German Colonial Society engaged Hauptmann Curt von François to provide security to the territory. In June 1889 he arrived with 21 troopers, 8 Imperial German Army soldiers and 13 volunteers in the British-held enclave of Walvis Bay. Soon afterwards François stationed himself at Otjimbingwe (against the advice of acting commissioner Heinrich Göring) in order to deal with opponents to German authority in the interior of the territory.

In May 1890 he renewed a former peace agreement with the Herero chief Maharero and eventually occupied the completely destroyed settlement of Windhoek (founded by Jonker Afrikaner decades earlier). Upon Maharero's death in October, his son Samuel Maharero had to reaffirm the treaty. At Windhoek, François set up the new headquarters of the German occupation (which he called Alte Feste, Old Fortress). This location was chosen because the Germans felt it would serve as a buffer zone between the Nama and Herero tribes. After Göring was recalled from office, François served as Reichskommissar of German South West Africa from March 1891 until November 1893. Within this time period (on 12 September 1892) he established the coastal town of Swakopmund as the main harbour of German South West Africa and mapped large parts of the colony. In November 1893 he was promoted to Major and given the title of Landeshauptmann.

François, concerned about a possible alliance between the Herero and Nama, decided to launch an unprovoked attack on the latter. On 12 April 1893, he led 225 German colonial troops on village of the Nama leader Hendrik Witbooi west of Rehoboth. Witbooi reportedly saw the Germans coming and retreated with most of his fighters to the Kuiseb River, expecting the Germans to follow them. However, François' forces attacked the village, killing 88 Nama people, 78 of whom were women and children. News of the massacre was reported and condemned in numerous newspapers, although both German and Cape Colony authorities tried to cover it up. Witbooi fled into the Naukluft Mountains, where he waged a guerrilla war against the Germans for several months. François attempted to drive the Nama into the Omaheke Desert as would later occur during the Herero and Nama genocide, but was unsuccessful. Following this failure, he was replaced in 1894 by Theodor Leutwein, who ended the war in August by compelling Witbooi to sign a peace treaty. François returned to Germany via Cape Town and retired from the military in 1895. In retirement in Zernsdorf, Brandenburg, he wrote extensively about his experiences in Africa.

== Private life ==
Von François married Damara princess Amalia Gawaxas while in German South West Africa. They had a daughter, Josephine. His wife died soon thereafter, and he remarried in Germany. His second wife was Margarethe Meyer zu Bohmte from a wealthy family. They had four children, two of which died in their infancy.

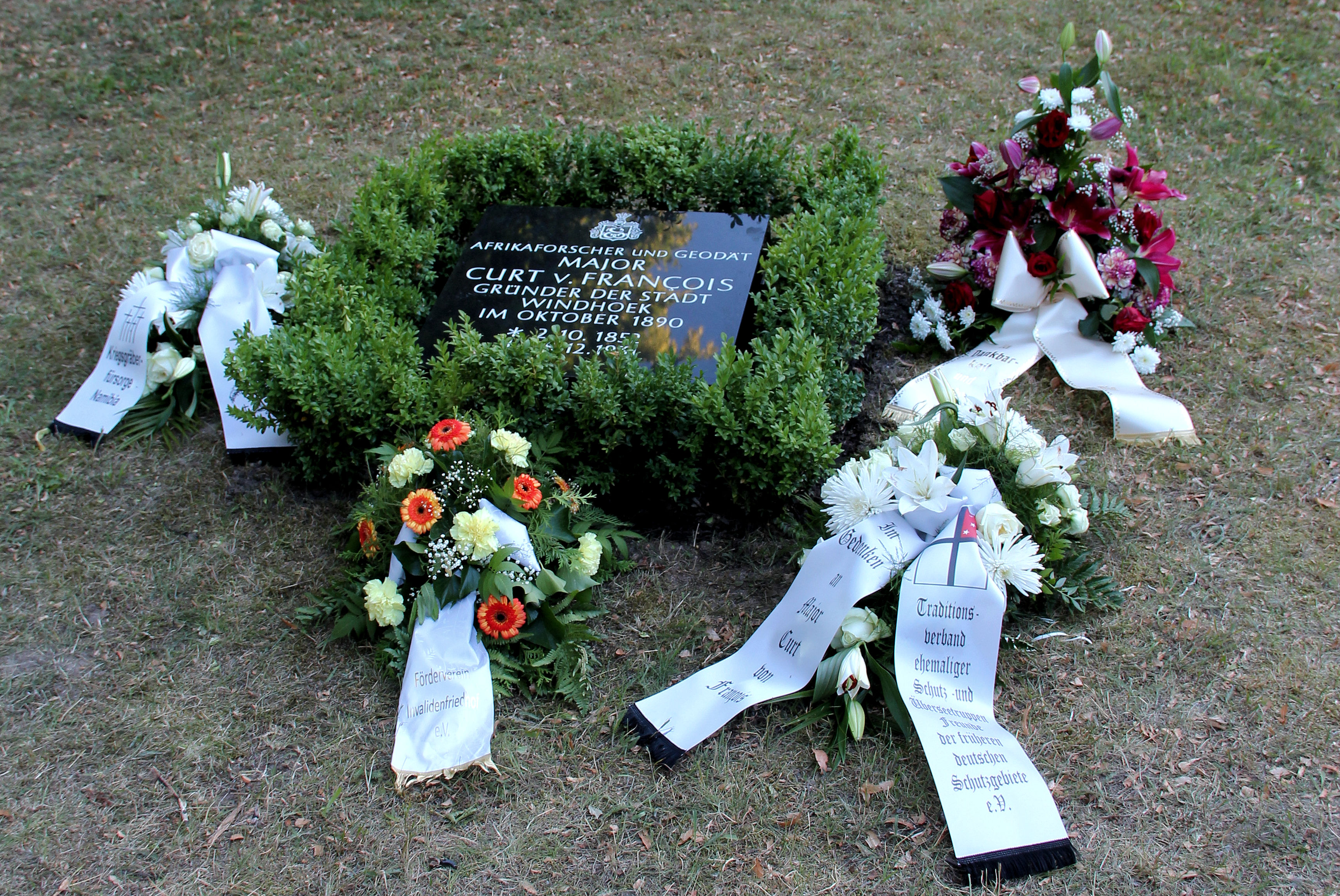
von François' restored grave in Berlin

Von François died in a Königs Wusterhausen hospital on 28 December 1931. He was interred in the Invalids' Cemetery in Berlin. The part of the cemetery where he was buried belonged to the forbidden area of the Eastern side of the Berlin Wall. This area was flattened, and of his grave only the location remained documented. From that information the grave was restored in 2018, and a tombstone was erected.

== Recognition ==
In front of Windhoek's municipal buildings there was a statue of von François. It was inaugurated on 18 October 1965 on the occasion of the 75th anniversary of the second foundation of the town by him. The statue was controversial in Windhoek, and several calls for its removal had been made prior to being taken down on 23 November 2022.

The original Schutztruppe headquarters built at the behest of François in 1890 at Windhoek was expanded in 1912, and has been a museum since 1962.

== Written works ==
- Reise im Hinterlandes des deutschen Schutzgebiets Togo, Mitteilungen Von Forschungsreisenden Und Gelehrten Aus Den Deutschen Schutzgebieten I, Berlin 1888 - Travel in the Hinterland of the German Togo Conservation Area, Communications from Researchers and Scholars from the German Protected Areas
- Die Erforschung des Tschuapa und Lulongo : Reisen in Centralafrika, Brockhaus, Leipzig 1888. - Exploration of Tschuapa and Lulongo: Travels in Central Africa.
- Deutsch-Südwest-Afrika, Verlag D. Reimer, Berlin 1899. - German South West Africa.
- Kriegführung in Süd-Afrika, Dietrich Reimer, Berlin 1900. - Warfare in South Africa.
- Lehren aus dem Südafrikanischen Kriege für das deutsche Heer. with eight sketches, Verlag E. S. Mittler & Sohn, Berlin 1901. - Lessons from the South African War for the German army.
- Der Hottentotten-Aufstand. Studie über die Vorgänge im Namalande v. Jan. 1904 bis 2. Jan. 1905 u. d. Aussichten d. Niederwerfung d. Aufstandes., Berlin 1905. - The Hottentot uprising, etc.
- Ohne Schuss durch dick und dünn: erste Erforschung des Togohinterlandes [Without a shot through thick and thin: First exploration of the Togo Hinterland] (Privately published by Dr. Erika Götz von François in 1972)

== References and external links ==
- Biographies of Namibian personalities by Klaus Dierks
- Kurt von François (1899). Deutsch-Südwest-Afrika. D. Reimer. ISBN 9783111095479.
