= Louis Nels =

German government official (1855–1910)

Reichskommissar for German South West Africa
- In office August 1890 – May 1891
- Preceded by: Heinrich Ernst Göring
- Succeeded by: Curt von François

Personal details
- Born: 16 December 1855
- Died: 13 November 1910 (aged 54)

Louis Nels (16 December 1855 – 13 November 1910) was a German government official who served as acting Reichskommissar in German South West Africa in 1890–1891.

Trained as a lawyer, he later joined the German civil service. Beginning in 1885 he served under acting Reichskommissar Heinrich Ernst Göring (1839–1913) in Otjimbingwe, the colonial headquarters of German South West Africa. In 1890 he became a colonial judge, and shortly afterwards replaced Göring as acting Reichskommissar. Nels would maintain this position from August 1890 to March 1891, when he was succeeded by Curt von François (1852–1931).

In 1891, he left German South West Africa, and afterwards was a consul in various foreign countries. Nels died on 13 November 1910 in Neuerburg, Germany.

In 1911, botanist Hans Schinz published Nelsia a genus of flowering plants from Africa, belonging to the family Amaranthaceae and named in Nels honour.
