= Jacob Morenga =

Namibian rebel leader (1875–1907)

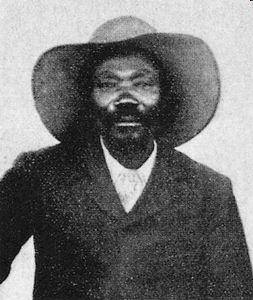
A picture of Jakobus Morenga, taken between 1904 and 1907.

Jacob Morenga, also Jakob, Jacobus, Marengo, and Marenga, known as the "black Napoleon", (1875 – 20 September 1907) was an important figure in Namibia, then the German colony of German South West Africa. He was chief leader in the insurrection against the German Empire which took place between 1904 and 1908, and was best known for forging an alliance between the rival Herero and Nama tribes.

== Life ==
Jacob Morenga was born to a Herero mother and Nama father. He was likely educated by Christian missionaries, and during his early adulthood, he worked at a copper mine and a Catholic mission in the vicinity of Springbok.

Morenga first became politically active through his association with Willem Christian, a leader of the Bondelswarts people. After Christian's son and successor, Jan Abraham Christian, was killed by German troops, the Bondelswarts launched a brief uprising in October 1903. Morenga served as one of the primary commanders of this uprising, which established his early reputation as a skilled tactician.

However, the bulk of Morenga's historical reputation stems from his leadership of anti-German guerrilla forces during the Herero and Nama War of 1904–1907. It often proved difficult for Morenga to maintain proper control of his armies, as their preferred methods of attack differed fundamentally. The Herero sought direct and open combat with German forces, while the Nama preferred more guerrilla-like tactics. The group under Morenga planned their attacks from the hidden fortress of ǁKhauxaǃnas in southern Namibia.

Captain Paul von Lettow-Vorbeck played a major role in the German pursuit of Jacob Morenga. During a 1906 gunfight against Morenga and his men, Captain von Lettow-Vorbeck suffered injuries to his left eye, which was left blind, and his chest.

The diverse and widely successful methods of attack used by Morenga's forces were enough to force a special election in the German Reichstag, due to the relatively heavy losses suffered by German troops. Morenga's leadership and tactical skills also led him to be praised even by opposing German commanders.

After more than 50 battles against German troops, Morenga was injured in an ambush on 4 May 1906, an attack which also killed twenty-three of his men. Soon afterward, Morenga turned himself in to the Cape Mounted Police (CMP), who imprisoned him in Tokai. The Germans called upon Britain to extradite Morenga, but Morenga submitted a request for political asylum that prevented the extradition from occurring. In June 1907, Morenga was released, on the condition that he would not return to German South West Africa. Despite this, he shortly began traveling northward, amassing followers and materiel. He soon began the task of assembling an army of native peoples to once again attack German troops. He gathered together the now-dispersed tribes of the Herero, Nama, and Witboois, leading them into battle once more against the German colonial empire. By August, it had become clear that Morenga had no intention of adhering to the conditions of his release. The CMP issued an arrest warrant against Morenga on 9 August 1907; meanwhile, Morenga successfully crossed the border into German South West Africa at some point between 13 and 19 August.

By September 1907, German and Cape Colony forces were cooperating to locate Morenga. He was eventually shot and killed in a battle between his forces and the combined German and South African forces on 20 September 1907 at Eenzaamheid.

== Recognition ==
Jacob Morenga is one of nine national heroes of Namibia that were identified at the inauguration of the country's Heroes' Acre near Windhoek. Founding president Sam Nujoma remarked in his inauguration speech on 26 August 2002 that:

Born of a Herero mother and a Nama father, Marenga had a vision of broad African nationalism which transcended narrow ethnic loyalties and he was therefore designated as 'the man of the future'. He employed scientific guerrilla tactics with the multi-ethnic troops under his command and engaged the German colonial army in more than fifty battles. [...] To his revolutionary spirit and his visionary memory we humbly offer our honor and respect.

Morenga is honoured in the form of a granite tombstone with his name engraved and his portrait plastered onto the slab. The cemetery of Warmbad in the far South of Namibia features a statue of Morenga. Jakob Marengo Secondary School and Tutorial College in Windhoek's Khomasdal suburb is named after him.

== In popular culture ==
In 20th century German literature, Uwe Timm's 1973 novel Morenga revolves around Jacob Morenga's uprising.
