= Hendrik Witbooi (Nama chief) =

ǀKhowesin chief (c. 1830–1905)

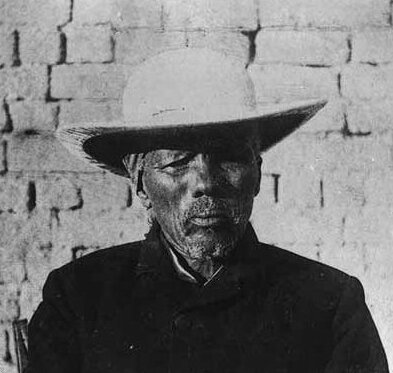

Kaptein of the ǀKhowesin
- Reign: 12 July 1888 – 29 October 1905
- Predecessor: Moses Witbooi
- Successor: Isaak Witbooi
- Born: 1830; Pella, Northern Cape, Cape Colony
- Died: 29 October 1905 (aged 74–75); Near Vaalgras, German South West Africa
- Khoekhoe language name: ǃNanseb ǀGâbemab
- Military career
- Conflicts: Herero Wars †

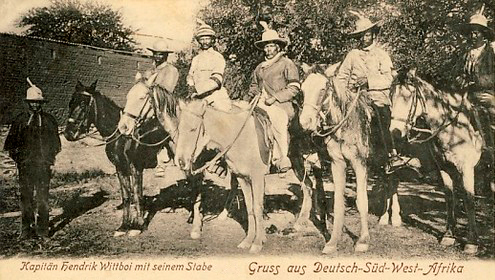
Nama – Chief Hendrik Witbooi (center) and his companions

Hendrik Witbooi (c. 1830 – 29 October 1905) was a chief of the ǀKhowesin people, a subgroup of the Nama people in present-day Namibia. He led the Nama people during their revolts against the German colonial empire. Witbooi is regarded as one of the national heroes of Namibia, and his face is portrayed on the obverse of all N$50, N$100, and N$200 Namibian dollar banknotes.

Becoming chief of the ǀKhowesin in 1888 following a power struggle, he united other Nama groups and led them during the first uprising against German colonial authorities from 1893 to 1894. This ended in a conditional surrender, and Witbooi began supporting the Germans in conflicts with other tribes. Following the outbreak of the Herero uprising in 1904, Witbooi and the Nama initially fought alongside the Germans against the Herero, including at the decisive battle of Waterberg in August 1904.

However in September that year Witbooi led another Nama revolt against the Germans. It ended in defeat and the Nama genocide, with an estimated 10,000 killed, around half of their prewar population. Witbooi was killed in action on 29 October 1905.

== Names ==
Kaptein Hendrik Witbooi (also spelled Witboi) was also known by the Nama name ǃNanseb ǀGâbemab and the nickname Kort (from Dutch kort = short), in Herero Korota or pejorative Otjikorota.

== Family and early life ==
Hendrik Witbooi was born into a prominent family among the Nama tribes, also known as the Khoekhoe. His grandfather, David Witbooi, was chief of the tribe, and led the people across the Orange River into Namaland. His father, Moses Witbooi, was also a chief of the tribe.

His uncle, Jonker Afrikaner, was another notable Nama chief, and became an opponent of Hendrik Witbooi. Jonker Afrikaner was the son of the famous Jager Afrikaner.

Witbooi was born circa 1830 in Pella, Northern Cape, in Cape Colony, which is today part of South Africa. He was educated as a Lutheran by German missionary Johannes Olp and was well-versed in many languages, including his native Nama. He married and had five daughters and seven sons, including Isaak Witbooi.

The ǀKhowesin Nama and other Nama tribes often fought amongst each other and with Herero tribes. After almost being killed in a conflict with the Herero, Witbooi had a vision that he had been chosen by God to lead his people north.

Witbooi was educated at Rhenish Missionary and Wesleyan Methodist schools in Namibia. He also studied at the Wilberforce Institute in Evaton, South Africa.

He initially began working as a teacher in 1856 at Keetmanshoop. He transferred in 1859 to Maltahöhe. He returned in 1865 to Gibeon at the request of the community and the Church to build on the foundations laid by his aging father.

== Rise to influence ==
Witbooi moved north on 16 May 1884, with a faction of the ǀKhowesin tribe. This was against the wishes of his father, Moses, who remained opposed to Hendrik's plans. As evidenced by his diaries (which make up a large portion of his surviving documents), Hendrik still admired his father greatly, despite their political differences. In late 1887, Moses' chief rival, his subchief Paul Visser, deposed Moses; he arranged to kill the chief on 22 February 1888.

Hendrik Witbooi advanced to leadership at Gibeon in 1888, achieved after numerous struggles. These contests took place long after the death of Jonker Afrikaner in 1861, which had opened the way for a power struggle among the various groups for paramount leadership. Hendrik finally defeated his last chief rival, Paul Visser, shooting him on 12 July 1888 and taking over leadership at Gibeon.

With this, Hendrik became chief of the ǀKhowesin people. He began to unite other Nama tribes under his control as well. By 1890, Hendrik Witbooi was signing all his letters, 'Chief of Great Namaqualand'.

== German conflicts ==
In the early morning of 12 April 1893, the ǀKhowesin were attacked by German colonial troops at the village of ǁNâǂgâs. 88 were killed, although Hendrik managed to escape with most of his fighting men. He campaigned against the Germans for two years, until the treaty of Gurus on 15 September 1894 where he agreed to a conditional surrender. Witbooi also decided to render military support for the Germans against other smaller tribes, such as the eastern Mbanderu Herero, Afrikaners, and Swartbooi.

After serving as a branch of the German army fighting against the Herero for the previous three years, Witbooi and the Nama again revolted against German rule in Namibia on 3 October 1904. During the ensuing war with the Germans in 1904–1905, Witbooi rallied his people with the conviction God had guided them to fight for their freedom from the imperialists. Witbooi was killed in action on 29 October 1905, near Vaalgras, near Koichas. His dying request was: "It is enough. The children should now have rest". He was replaced by Fransman Nama until the Nama surrendered in 1908.

== Recognition ==
Kaptein Hendrik Witbooi is one of nine national heroes of Namibia who were identified at the inauguration of the country's Heroes' Acre near Windhoek. Founding president Sam Nujoma remarked in his inauguration speech on 26 August 2002 that:

Kaptein Hendrik Witbooi was the first African leader who took up arms against the German imperialists and foreign occupiers in defence of our land and territorial integrity. We, the new generation of the Land of the Brave, are inspired by Kaptein Hendrik Witbooi's revolutionary action in combat against the German Imperialists who colonized and oppressed our peoples. To his revolutionary spirit and his visionary memory we humbly offer our honour and respect.

Witbooi is honored in the form of a granite tombstone with his name engraved and his portrait plastered onto the slab. His face was portrayed on the obverse of all Namibian dollar banknotes until 20 March 2012 and is still on all N$50, N$100, and N$200 notes.

Witbooi's diary and complete correspondence have survived and became known as the Hendrik Witbooi Papers. It is stored in the National Archives of Namibia in Windhoek. In 2005, UNESCO inscribed the archive in its Memory of the World International Register, recognising Witbooi's journals as documentary heritage of global importance.

== Cultural depictions ==
Witbooi is the subject of Conny Braam's 2016 Dutch-language novel Ik ben Hendrik Witbooi depicting his struggle against German colonialism. Witbooi is depicted in the 1989 South African Boer War miniseries Arende, where he is the leader of a group that ambushes the protagonist, Sloet Steenkamp, party of Boer exiles in the final episode of the last season.

== Repatriation of his Bible and whip ==
=== Seizure during the 1893 attack on Hornkranz ===
Two personal belongings associated with Henrik Witbooi, a family Bible and a whip were seized by German colonial troops during the attack on his headquarters at Hornkranz on 12 April 1893. The Bible was an 1866 edition of the New Testament in Khoekhoegowab (Nama), containing handwritten annotations by Witbooi and members of is family.

The objects were taken during an attack led by German colonial ofifcer Curt von Francois, in which numerous Nama women and children were killed. The Bible and whip subsequently entered the collection of Linden Museum in Stuttgart in 1902, having been sent by Paul Wassmannsdorf, a former colonial officer.

The objects remained in the museum's collection for more than a century, acquiring historical and symbolic importance in Namibia because of Witbooi's role in resistance to German colonial rule, and the Bible's association with his religious beliefs and family history.

=== Early restitution demands and diplomatic engagement ===
Efforts to secure the return of the Bible and whip began in 2007 when the Linden Museum organized an exhibition examining historical representations of Khoisan peoples, which included Witbooi's whip and references to his Bible. The exhibition prompted a member of the Archives of Anti-Colonial Resistance and the Liberation Struggle programme to contact the museum about returning the objects. The question of their return was subsequently raised in Baden-Wurttemberg's state parliament by Green Party politician Gisela Splett, as part of wider discussion concerning colonial era collections and the repatriation of cultural heritage and human remains from Germany to Namibia

In 2013, Namibia's ambassador to Germany, Neville Gertze approached Baden-Wurttemberg on behalf of the Namibian government concerning the return of the Bible. The request formed part of continuing discussion over cultural objects removed from Namibia during German colonial rule. The object's provenance and the history of their removal were also examined through research at the Linden Museum. Their restitution became associated with Baden-Wurttemberg's With Namibia: Engaging the Past, Sharing the Future initiative, which sought to develop cooperation between German and Namibian cultural institutions

=== Negotiations and preparations for restitution ===
In late September and early October 2018, a delegation from Baden Wurttemberg visited Namibia to discuss the return of the objects. The delegation included representatives of the state Ministry of Science, Research and Arts, the Liden Museum and academic and archival institutions. The negotiations concerned both the restitution arrangements and the relationship between German institutions and Namibian communities affected by colonial era disposition.

In November 2018, Baden Wurttemberg's minister-president, Winfried Kretschmann, publicly announced the planned return of the objects, describing the decision as part of the state's effort to address its colonial history.

Before their departure, the Bible and whip were displayed at the Linden Museum in a temporary exhibition held from 11 December 2018 until 17 February 2019. This exhibition addresses their historical significance and the circumstances of their acquisition during German colonial rule

=== Dispute over ownership and custodianship ===
The return of Witbooi's Bible and whip generated disagreement between the Namibian government and representatives of the Witbooi traditional authority over who should receive and retain the objects. In February 2019, the Namibia's Ministry of Education, Arts and Culture announced arrangements for the object's return and their official reception by the Namibian state. Representatives of the Witbooi traditional authority challenged these arrangements, arguing that the objects were family heirlooms and should be returned to the traditional community rather than placed under government control.

The traditional authority sought legal assistance in communicating its objections to the Linden Museum, and American lawyer, Kenneth McCallion, wrote to the museum on behalf of the traditional authority, seeking to halt or reconsider the planned handover arrangements. The dispute occurred against the background of disagreements over succession and leadership within the Witbooi traditional community.

German officials proceeded with the planned state to state restitution, while controversy highlighted differing interpretations of cultural ownership, traditional authority and the responsibilities of the Namibian state.

=== Official restitution ceremony in 2019 ===
On 28 February 2019, the Bible and whip were formally returned to Namibia by the German state of Baden-Wurttemberg at a ceremony in Gibeon, a town closely associated with Witbooi and his descendants.

Theresia Bauer, Baden-Wurttemberg's Minister of Science, Research and Arts, presented the objects to then Namibian president Hage Geingob. The ceremony was attended by approximately 3,000 people, including representatives of the Witbooi family, traditional leaders, government officials and the former presidents Sam Nujoma and Hifikepunye Pohamba.

The return was the first restitution of colonial era cultural objects from a museum in Baden- Wurttemberg. German officials presented it as a step towards reconciliation and renewed cooperation with Namibia, while Namibian representatives emphasized the object's significance for national history and remembrance. Following the handover, German and Namibian representatives visited Hornkranz, the site of the 1893 attack during which objects has been seized. The visit drew attention to the victims of the attack and the preservation of graves and memorial sites associated with colonial conflicts.

=== Custody and conservation following the restitution ===
Following the return, the Bible and whip were placed in different Namibian heritage institutions for preservation. The Bible was deposited at the National Archives of Namibia, while the whip was placed in the National Museum of Namibia. This decision was as a result of the different conservation requirements of both objects, although, questions about their custody and accessibility remained connected to the earlier dispute between the government and Witbooi traditional representatives.

Conservation research subsequently examined the challenges involved in preserving the objects, including their exposure to environmental conditions during the public handover and the need for appropriate storage and preventive conservation. The Bible's transfer from a museum collection to a national archival institution also raised questions about how restituted objects are classified, documented and made accessible after their return.
