= Harald Kleinschmidt =

German historian

Harald Kleinschmidt (born 1 June 1949) is a German historian and scholar of international relations. He completed his doctorate in philosophy at the University of Göttingen.

Kleinschmidt is currently a professor of history at the University of Tsukuba.

== Bibliography ==
Some of Kleinschmidt's books include:

- Charles V: The World Emperor
- Nemesis of Power: A History of International Relations Theories
- Migration, Regional Integration and Human Security: The Formation and Maintenance of Transnational Spaces
- Perception and Action in Medieval Europe
