= Theodor Leutwein =

Colonial administrator of German Southwest Africa (1849–1921)

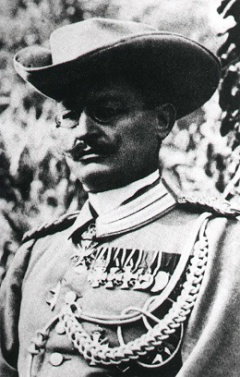

Governor of German South West Africa
- In office 15 March 1894 – 19 August 1905
- Monarch: Wilhelm II
- Chancellor: Leo von Caprivi; Chlodwig Carl Viktor; Bernhard von Bülow
- Director of the Colonial Department: Paul Kayser; Oswald von Richthofen; Gerhard von Buchka; Oscar Wilhelm Stübel; Prince Ernst II of Hohenlohe-Langenburg
- Preceded by: Curt von François
- Succeeded by: Lothar von Trotha

Personal details
- Born: 19 May 1849 Waldbrunn, Grand Duchy of Baden
- Died: 13 April 1921 (aged 71) Freiburg im Breisgau, Baden, Germany

Military service
- Allegiance: Grand Duchy of Baden (1868–1871); German Empire (1871–1905)
- Branch/service: Baden Army; Prussian Army; Schutztruppe
- Years of service: 1868–1905
- Rank: Colonel char. Generalmajor
- Commands: Imperial Schutztruppe for German South West Africa
- Battles/wars: Franco-Prussian War; Khaua-Mbandjeru rebellion Herero Wars

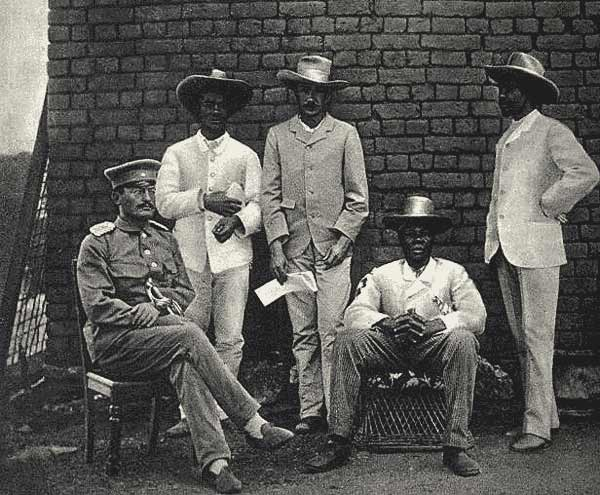
Theodor Leutwein (seated left), Zacharias Zeraua (2nd from left) and Manasseh Tyiseseta (seated, fourth from left), 1895

Theodor Gotthilf Leutwein (9 May 1849 – 13 April 1921) was a German military officer and colonial administrator who served as Landeshauptmann and governor of German South West Africa from 1894 to 1905.

== Life and career ==
Leutwein was born in Strümpfelbrunn in the Grand Duchy of Baden. He joined the Baden Army in 1868, served in the Franco-Prussian War and afterwards was taken over into the Prussian Army. Following several promotions he achieved the rank of major in 1893. In 1894 he replaced Curt von François as commander of the Imperial Schutztruppe for German South West Africa (Imperial Security Troop). His personal goal in the colony was to create "colonialism without bloodshed". During his tenure there, Leutwein created a decentralized administration with three regional centers (Windhoek, Otjimbingwe and Keetmanshoop). The construction of the first railroad between Windhoek and the seaport of Swakopmund was built during his rule. In 1899 he was promoted to lieutenant colonel, rising to the rank of colonel in 1901.

His policies with the native Africans, which he called the "Leutwein System", was a mixture of diplomacy, "divide-and-rule" and military coercion. His relationship with the indigenous Nama and Herero tribes were tenuous at best. Conversely, he was often criticized by German colonists as being too lenient with the Africans. In 1904 an uprising by the Herero was the beginning of the end of his colonial leadership. Soon after the uprising began Wilhelm II replaced Leutwein with the notorious General Lothar von Trotha. In May 1904 he admitted that the Germans had not taken one Herero prisoner, following an inquiry by the SDAP Reichstag deputy August Bebel.

In 1906, Leutwein published a memoir, "Elf Jahre als Gouverneur in Deutsch-Südwestafrika" ("Eleven Years as Governor in German South West Africa"), a historical account of his career in German Southwest Africa. He died in Freiburg.
