= Bondelswarts =

Nama ethnic group

The Bondelswarts are a Nama ethnic group of Southern Africa living in the extreme south of Namibia, in an area centred on the town of Warmbad.

== History ==
They rose up against German colonial rule in the Nama War 1903-1906. They were brutally repressed.

They inhabit an arid region around Fish River Canyon and the Richtersveld.

In 1922 they were involved in the Bondelswarts Rebellion, a revolt against a tax on dogs, which was violently repressed.
