= ǀKhowesin =

Ethnic group in Namibia

The ǀKhowesin (literally 'queen bees', also: Witbooi Nama or Witbooi Orlam) are one of five clans of the Oorlam people, a subgroup of the Nama people. They originated from Pella in modern-day South Africa and migrated to German South West Africa from the Cape Colony during the late 19th century under the direction of their chief Kido Witbooi. The clan crossed the Orange River and moved to the Fish River area, living a nomadic existence; they eventually settled in what became known as Gibeon in modern-day Namibia.
