= Khoekhoe =

African pastoralist indigenous group

Khoekhoe people Khoekhoen
Total population
- 333,400

Languages
- Khoekhoegowab

Religion
- Christianity, Traditional African religions

Related ethnic groups
- San people, Basters, Coloured people, Tswana people, Xhosa people

Khoikhoi or Khoekhoe (/ˈkɔɪkɔɪ/ KOY-koy) (Note: This is the native praise address, khoi-khoi "people of people" or "proper humans", as it were, from khoi "human being". Khoekhoe pronunciation: [kxʰoekxʰoe].) are the traditionally nomadic pastoralist indigenous population of Southern Africa. They are often grouped with the hunter-gatherer San (literally "foragers") peoples, the accepted term for the two people being Khoisan. The designation "Khoikhoi" is actually a kare, or praise address, not an ethnic endonym, but it has been used in the literature as an ethnic term for Khoe-speaking peoples of Southern Africa, particularly pastoralist groups, such as the Inqua, Griqua, Gonaqua, Nama, Damaqua and Attequa. The Khoekhoe were once known as Hottentots, a term now considered offensive.

The Khoekhoe are thought to have diverged from other humans 100,000 to 200,000 years ago. (Note: Some scholars contest that cultures and identities can't be considered fixed or invariable, especially over such a long time period.) In the 17th century, the Khoekhoe maintained large herds of Nguni cattle in the Cape region. They mostly gave up nomadic pastoralism in the 19th to 20th century.

The Khoekhoe language is related to certain dialects spoken by foraging San peoples of the Kalahari, such as the Khwe and Tshwa, forming the Khoe language family. Khoekhoe subdivisions today are the Nama people of Namibia, Botswana and South Africa (with numerous clans), the Damara of Namibia, the Orana clans of South Africa (such as Nama or Ngqosini), the Khoemana or Griqua nation of South Africa, and the Gqunukhwebe or Gona clans which fall under the Xhosa-speaking polities.

The Xirikua clans (Griqua) developed their own ethnic identity in the 19th century and settled in Griqualand West. Later, they formed another independent state in KwaZulu-Natal named Griqualand East, which was annexed into the British Empire roughly a decade later. They are related to the same kinds of clan formations as Rehoboth Basters, who could also be considered a "Khoekhoe" people.

== History ==
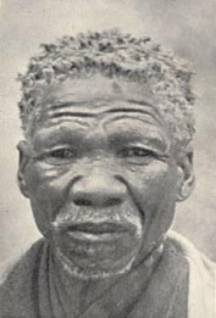
A Khoekhoe man

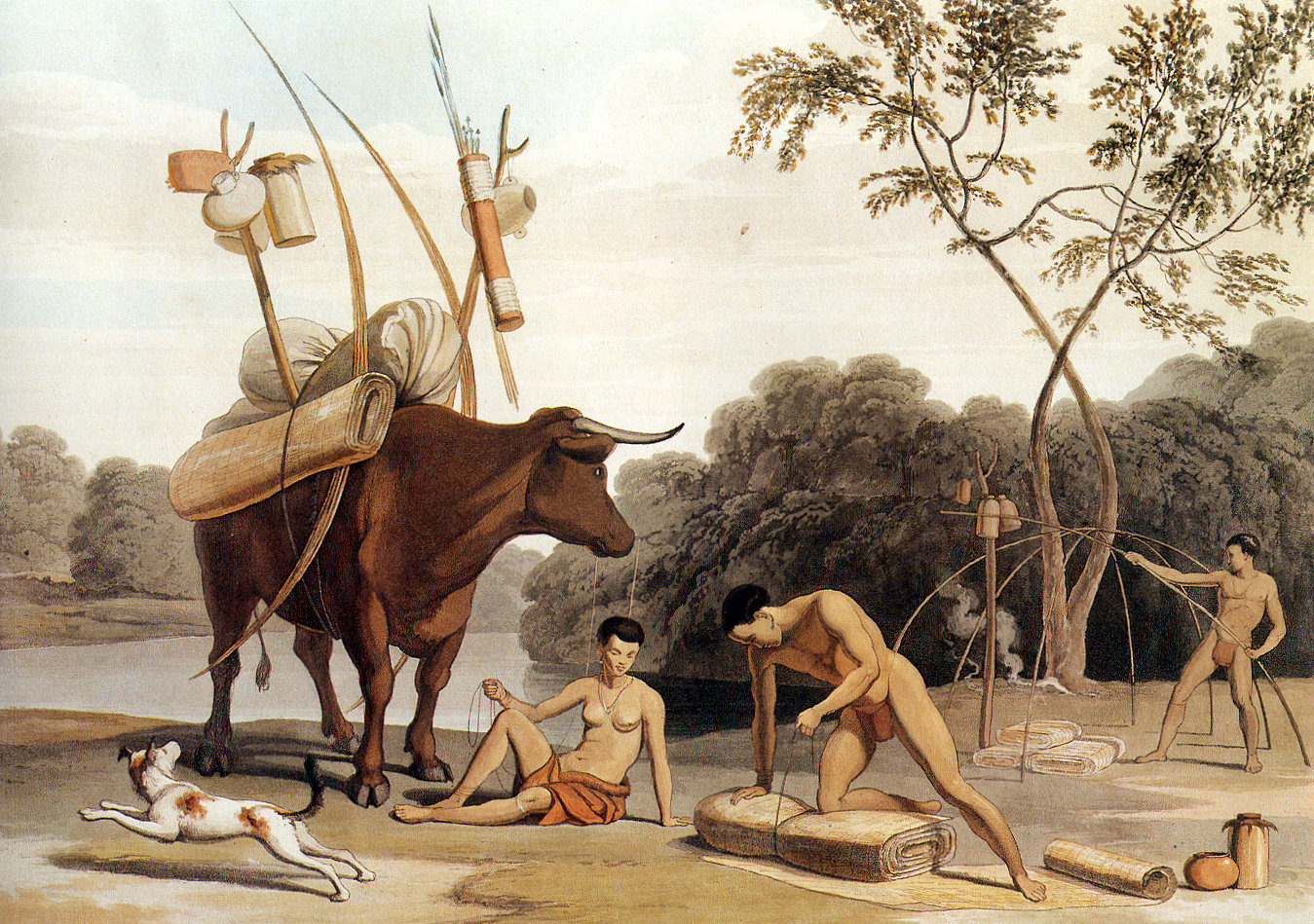
Nomadic Khoekhoe dismantling their huts, by Samuel Daniell (1805)

=== Early history ===
The broad ethnic designation of "Khoekhoen" refers to the peoples originally part of a pastoral culture and language group to be found across Southern Africa. Mellet, citing Ehlpick, claims that a people he calls "proto-Khoe" emerged between 400 BCE and 100 CE in southern Zimbabwe in the context of engagement between the San foundation peoples Tshua and Khwe, and the slow migratory drift of herding communities from East Africa. He adds that those engagements and genetic mixing also occurred in northern Botswana, along the Limpopo River as well as in the northern parts of present-day South Africa. Between 200 BCE and 300 CE, what started as micro-communities with mixed means of sustenance including hunting, herding and farming, solidified as larger communities of herders, first of sheep and later of cattle, alongside the Bantu farmers. By 500 CE, these pastoralist groups, steadily spread southward. There is some debate among social scientists about the pace and routes of their migration, but according to Sadr, there is no evidence of widespread Khoekhoe settlements, nor of large number of sheep or cattle, south of the Orange River before 1000 CE. "Khoekhoe" groups include ǀAwakhoen to the west, and ǀKx'abakhoena of South and mid-South Africa, and the Eastern Cape. Both of these terms mean "Red People", and are equivalent to the IsiXhosa term "amaqaba". Husbandry of sheep, goats and cattle grazing in fertile valleys across the region provided a stable, balanced diet, and allowed these lifestyles to spread, with larger groups forming in a region previously occupied by the subsistence foragers.

Ntu-speaking agriculturalist culture is thought to have entered the region in the 3rd century AD, pushing pastoralists into the Western areas. The example of the close relation between the ǃUriǁ'aes (High clan), a cattle-keeping population, and the !Uriǁ'aeǀ'ona (High clan children), a more-or-less sedentary forager population (also known as "Strandlopers"), both occupying the area of ǁHuiǃgaeb, shows that the strict distinction between these two lifestyles is unwarranted, as well as the ethnic categories that are derived. Foraging peoples who ideologically value non-accumulation as a social value system would be distinct, however, but the distinctions among "Khoekhoe pastoralists", "San hunter-gatherers" and "Bantu agriculturalists" do not hold up to scrutiny, and appear to be historical reductionism.

While there are several theories about the Damaran and their links to the rest of the Khoekhoe, it is undeniable that they were originally the first inhabitants of Namibia along with the San, as such it is dubitable that the Nama and Damara peoples both had a hand in the creation of the Khoekhoe language as it spread southward. Following the migration of Bantu groups such as the Herero, the Damaran were displaced and migrated throughout all corners of what is today Namibia, this can be noted in a word used by Damaran when referring to the country.

=== Arrival of Europeans ===
Portuguese explorers and merchants are the first to record their contacts, in the 15th and 16th centuries A.D. The ongoing encounters were often violent. In 1510, at the Battle of Salt River, Francisco de Almeida and fifty of his men were killed and his party was defeated by ox-mounted !Uriǁ'aekua ("Goringhaiqua" in Dutch approximate spelling), which was one of the so-called Khoekhoe clans of the area that also included the !Uriǁ'aeǀ'ona ("Goringhaicona", also known as "Strandlopers"), said to be the ancestors of the !Ora nation of today. In the late 16th century, Portuguese, French, Danish, Dutch and English but mainly Portuguese ships regularly continued to stop over in Table Bay en route to the Indies. They traded tobacco, copper and iron with the Khoekhoe-speaking clans of the region, in exchange for fresh meat.

The local population reduced after smallpox epidemics spread through European contact. The Khoe-speaking clans suffered high mortality due to a lack of acquired immunity to the disease. This increased, as military conflict with the intensification of the colonial expansion of the United East India Company that began to enclose traditional grazing land for farms. Over the following century, the Khoe-speaking peoples were steadily driven off their land, resulting in numerous northwards migrations, and the reformulation of many nations and clans, as well as the dissolution of many traditional structures.

According to professors Robert K. Hitchcock and Wayne A. Babchuk, "During the early phases of European colonization, tens of thousands of Khoekhoe and San peoples lost their lives as a result of genocide, murder, physical mistreatment, and disease." During an investigation into "bushman hunting" parties and genocidal raids on the San, Louis Anthing commented: "I find now that the transactions are more extensive than did at first appear. I think it not unlikely that we shall find that almost all the farmers living near this border are implicated in similar acts ... At present I have only heard of coloured farmers (known as Bastards) as being mixed up with these matters."

"Khoekhoe" social organisation was thus profoundly damaged by the colonial expansion and land seizure from the late 17th century onwards. As social structures broke down, many Khoekhoen settled on farms and became bondsmen (bondservants, serfs) or farm workers; others were incorporated into clans that persisted. Georg Schmidt, a Moravian Brother from Herrnhut, Saxony, now Germany, founded Genadendal in 1738, which was the first mission station in southern Africa, among the Khoe-speaking peoples in Baviaanskloof in the Riviersonderend Mountains.

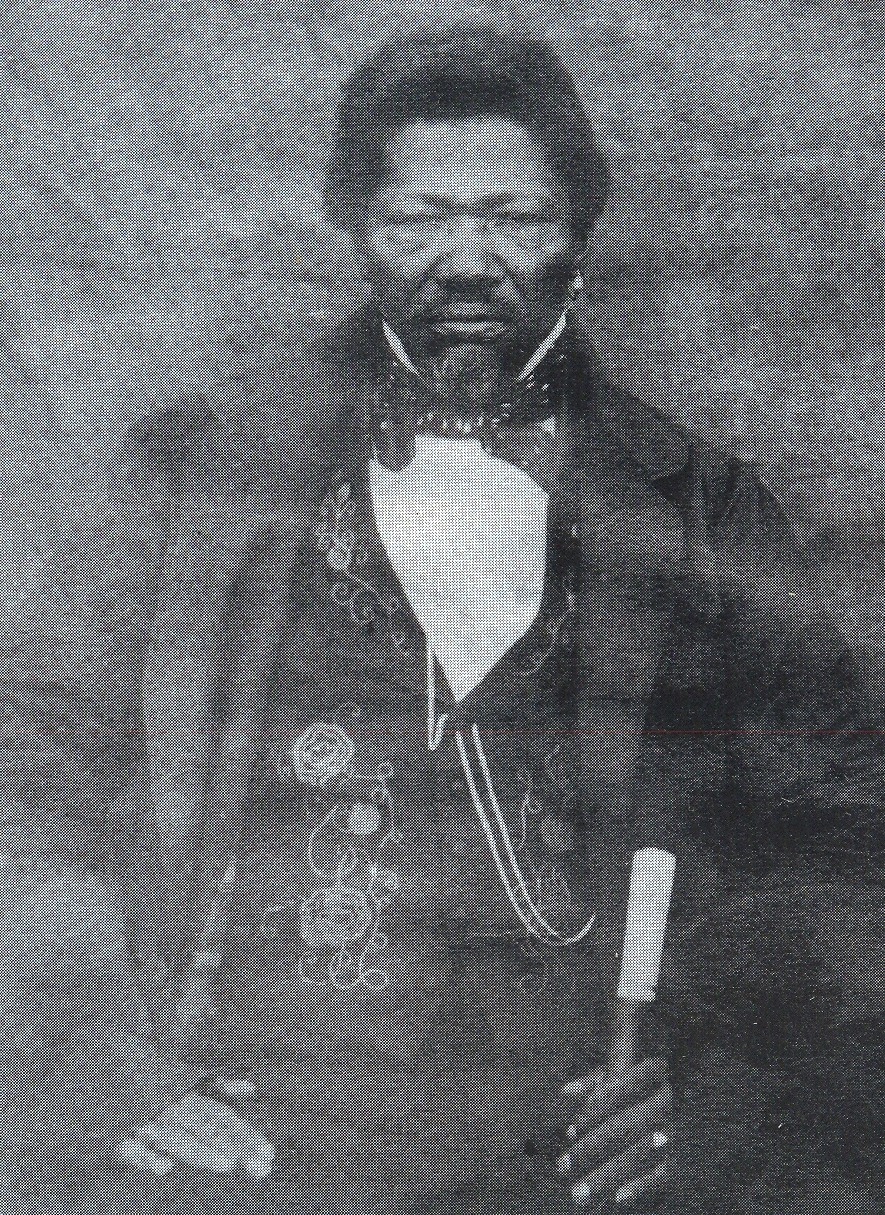
Adam Kok, leader of the Griqua nation

The colonial designation of "Baasters" came to refer to any clans that had European ancestry in some part and adopted certain Western cultural traits. Though these were later known as Griqua (Xirikua or Griekwa) they were known at the time as "Basters" and in some instances are still so called, e. g., the Bosluis Basters of the Richtersveld and the Baster community of Rehoboth, Namibia, mentioned above.

Arguably responding to the influence of missionaries, the states of Griqualand West and Griqualand East were established by the Kok dynasty; these were later absorbed into the Cape Colony of the British Empire.

Beginning in the late 18th century, Oorlam communities migrated from the Cape Colony north to Namaqualand. They settled places earlier occupied by the Nama. They came partly to escape Dutch colonial conscription, partly to raid and trade, and partly to obtain herding lands. Some of these emigrant Oorlams (including the band led by the outlaw Jager Afrikaner and his son Jonker Afrikaner in the Transgariep) retained links to Oorlam communities in or close to the borders of the Cape Colony. In the face of gradual Boer expansion and then large-scale Boer migrations away from British rule at the Cape, Jonker Afrikaner brought his people into Namaqualand by the mid-19th century, becoming a formidable force for Oorlam domination over the Nama and against the Bantu-speaking Hereros for a period.

=== Kat River settlement (1829–1856) and Khoena in the Cape Colony ===
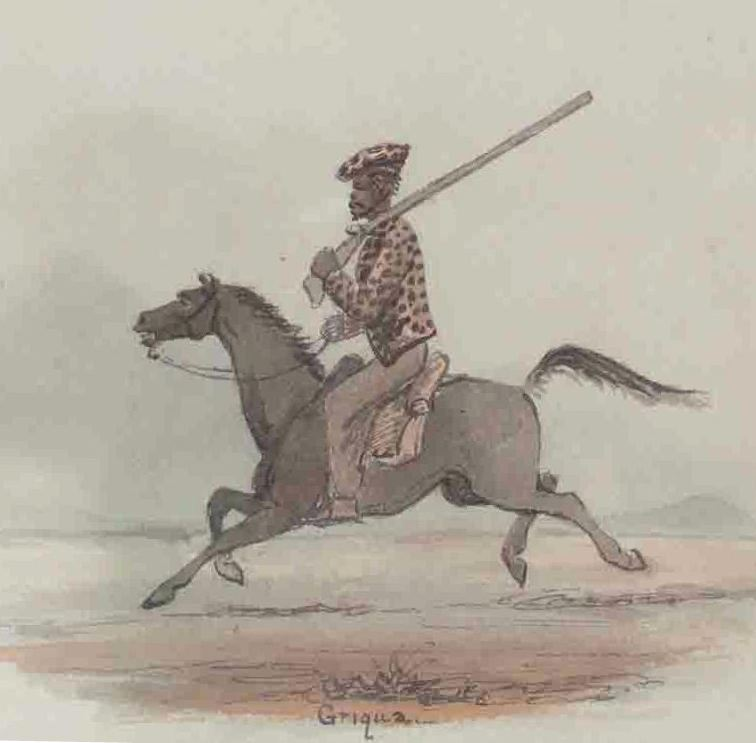
Khoekua marksmen played a key role in the Cape Frontier Wars.

By the early 1800s, the remaining Khoe-speakers of the Cape Colony suffered from restricted civil rights and discriminatory laws on land ownership. With this pretext, the powerful Commissioner General of the Eastern Districts, Andries Stockenstrom, facilitated the creation of the "Kat River" Khoe settlement near the eastern frontier of the Cape Colony. The more cynical motive was probably to create a buffer-zone on the Cape's frontier, but the extensive fertile land in the region allowed people to own their land and build communities in peace. The settlements thrived and expanded, and Kat River quickly became a large and successful region of the Cape that subsisted more or less autonomously. The people were predominantly Afrikaans-speaking !Gonakua, but the settlement also began to attract other diverse groups.

Khoekua were known at the time for being very good marksmen, and were often invaluable allies of the Cape Colony in its frontier wars with the neighbouring Xhosa politics. In the Seventh Frontier War (1846–1847) against the Gcaleka, the Khoekua gunmen from Kat River distinguished themselves under their leader Andries Botha in the assault on the "Amatola fastnesses". (The young John Molteno, later Prime Minister, led a mixed commando in the assault, and later praised the Khoekua as having more bravery and initiative than most of his white soldiers.)

However, harsh laws were still implemented in the Eastern Cape, to encourage the Khoena to leave their lands in the Kat River region and to work as labourers on white farms. The growing resentment exploded in 1850. When the Xhosa rose against the Cape Government, large numbers Khoeǀ'ona joined the Xhosa rebels for the first time. After the defeat of the rebellion and the granting of representative government to the Cape Colony in 1853, the new Cape Government endeavoured to grant the Khoena political rights to avert future racial discontent. Attorney General William Porter was famously quoted as saying that he "would rather meet the Hottentot at the hustings, voting for his representative, than meet him in the wilds with his gun upon his shoulder". Thus, the government enacted the Cape franchise in 1853, which decreed that all male citizens meeting a low property test, regardless of colour, had the right to vote and to seek election in Parliament. However, this non-racial principle was eroded in the late 1880s by a literacy test, and later abolished by the Apartheid Government.

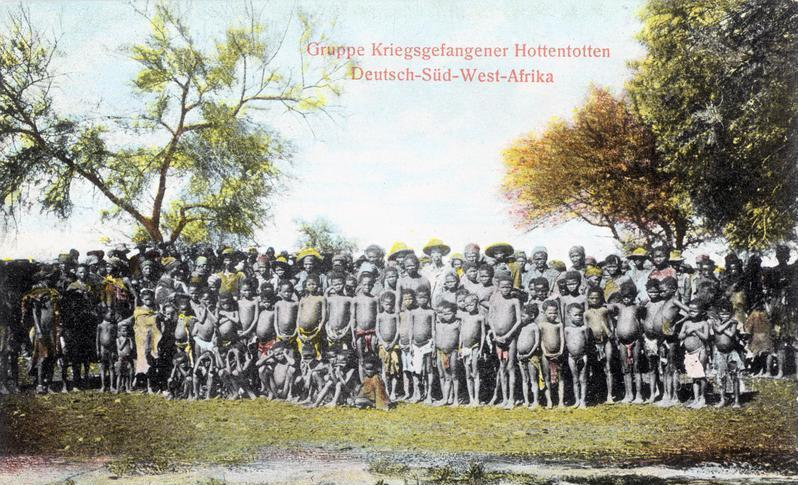
Khoekhoe prisoners of war in German South-West Africa, 1904

=== Massacres in German South-West Africa ===
From 1904 to 1907, the Germans took up arms against the Khoekhoe group living in what was then German South-West Africa, along with the Herero. Over 10,000 Nama, more than half of the total Nama population at the time, may have died in the conflict. This was the single greatest massacre ever witnessed by the Khoekhoe people. In addition to the Nama and Herero deaths, the Damara are lesser-known victims of the genocide who lost around 57% of their population.

=== Apartheid ===
As native African people, Khoekhoe and other dark-skinned, indigenous groups were oppressed and subjugated under the white-supremacist Apartheid regime. In particular, some consider Khoekhoe and related ethnic groups to have been some of the most heavily marginalized groups during Apartheid's reign, as referenced by previous South African president Jacob Zuma in his 2012 state of the nation address.

Some Khoekhoe in South Africa were classified as "Coloured" under Apartheid. While this meant that they were offered a few privileges not given to the population deemed "black" (such as not having to carry a passbook), they were still subject to discrimination, segregation, and other forms of oppression. This included the forced relocation caused by the Group Areas Act, which broke up families and communities. The destruction of historical communities and the blanket designation of "coloured" (ignoring any nuances of the Khoekhoe peoples' specific cultures or subgroups) contributed to an erasure of Khoekhoe identity and culture, one which modern Khoekhoe people are still working to undo.

Apartheid ended in 1994 and so too did the racial "Coloured" designation.

=== Modern era ===
After apartheid, Khoekhoe activists have worked to restore their lost culture, and affirm their ties to the land. Khoekhoe and Khoisan groups have brought cases to court demanding restitution for 'cultural genocide and discrimination against the Khoisan nation', as well as land rights and the return of Khoesan corpses from European museums.

== Culture ==
=== Religion ===
The religious mythology of the Khoe-speaking cultures gives special significance to the Moon, which may have been viewed as the physical manifestation of a supreme being associated with heaven. Thiǁoab (Tsui'goab in Nama and ǁGamab in Damara mythology) is also believed to be the creator and the guardian of health, while ǁGaunab is primarily an evil being, who causes sickness or death. Many Khoe-speakers have converted to Christianity and Nama Muslims make up a large percentage of Namibia's Muslims.

=== World Heritage ===
UNESCO has recognised Khoe-speaking culture through its inscription of the Richtersveld as a World Heritage Site. This important area is the only place where transhumance practices associated with the culture continue to any great extent.

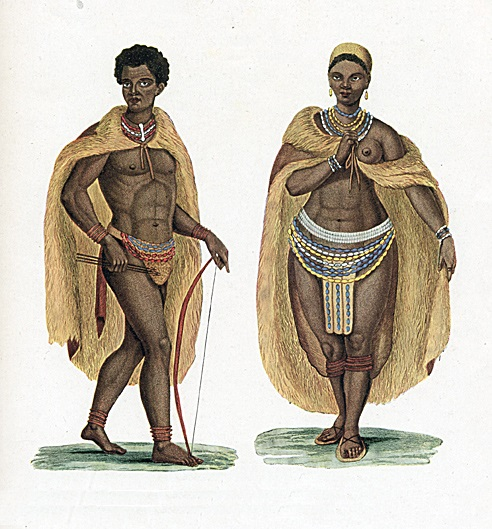
Khoekhoe in traditional clothing and adornment

The International Astronomical Union named the primary component of the binary star Mu¹ Scorpii after the traditional Khoekhoe language name Xami di mûra ('eyes of the lion').

== List of Khoekhoe peoples ==
The classification of Khoekhoe peoples can be broken down roughly into two groupings: Northern Khoekhoe & Southern Khoekhoe (Cape Khoe).

=== Northern Khoekhoe ===
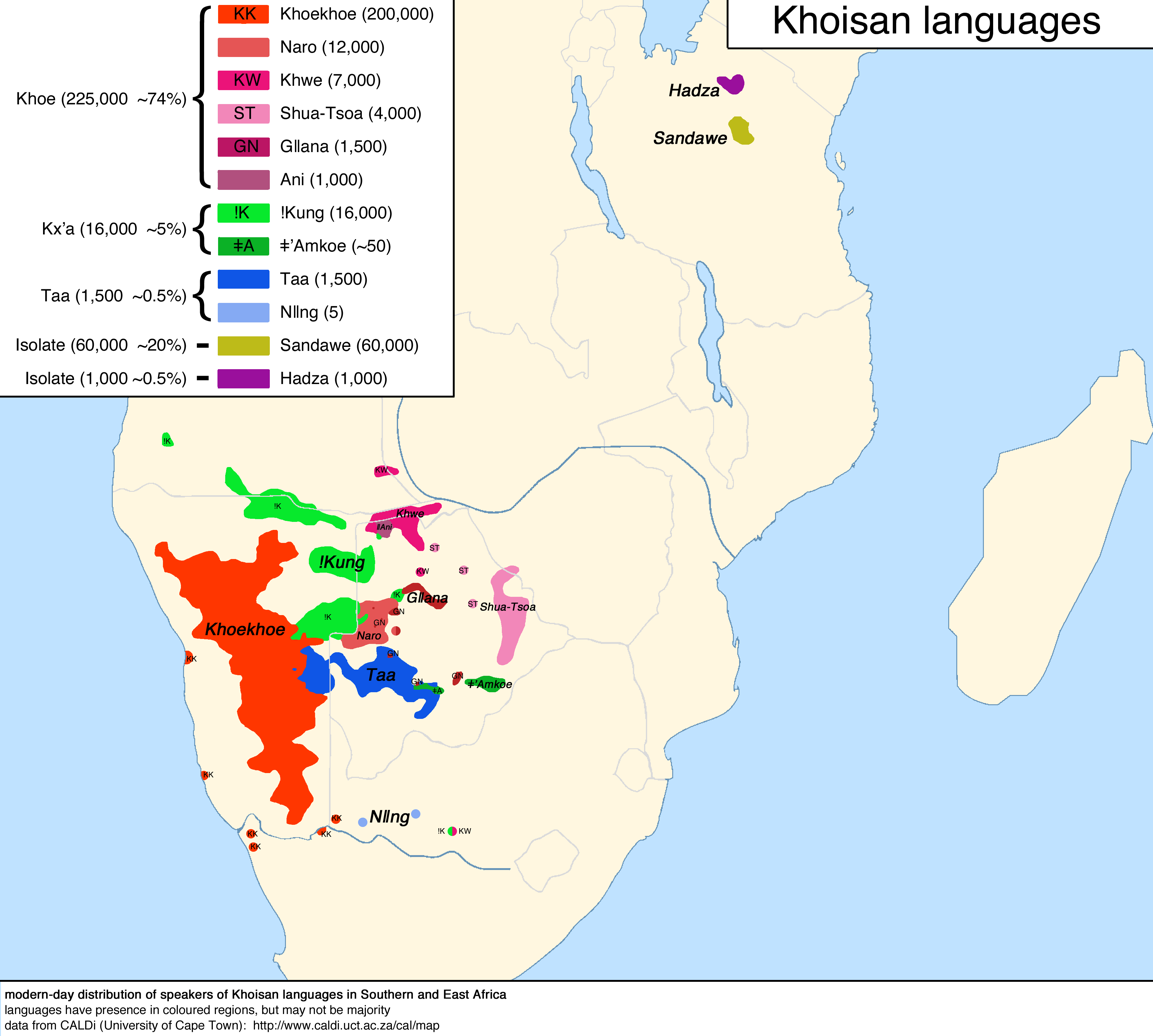
Present distribution of speakers of Khoisan languages. The Khoekhoe languages are shaded red.

The Northern Khoekhoe are sub divided into two groups, namely the Nama and the Damara, or ǂNūkhoen. Each of these two groups are further subdivided into several clans. The clans of Nama are:

- Khaiǁkhaun (Red Nation) at Hoachanas, the main group and the oldest Nama clan in Namibia
- ǀKhowesen (Direct descendants of Captain Hendrik Witbooi) who was killed in the battle with Germans on 29 October 1905. The |Khowesin, reside in modern-day Gibeon under the leadership of Ismael Hendrik Witbooi the 9th Gaob (meaning captain) of the |Khowesen Gibeon, situated 72 km south of Mariental and 176 km north of Keetmanshoop just off the B1, was originally known by the name Khaxa-tsûs. It received its name from Kido Witbooi first Kaptein of the ǀKhowesin.
- ǃGamiǂnun (Bondelswarts) at Warmbad
- ǂAonin (Southern Topnaars) at Rooibank
- ǃGomen (Northern Topnaars) at Sesfontein
- ǃKharakhoen (Fransman Nama) at Gochas. After being defeated by Imperial Germany's Schutztruppe in the Battle of Swartfontein on 15 January 1905, this Nama group split into two. Part of the ǃKharakhoen fled to Lokgwabe, Botswana, and stayed there permanently, the part that remained on South West African soil relocated their tribal centre to Amper-Bo. In 2016 David Hanse was inaugurated as chief of the clan.
- ǁHawoben (Veldschoendragers) at Koës
- !Aman at Bethanie which was led by Cornelius Frederick
- ǁOgain (Groot Doden) at Schlip
- ǁKhauǀgoan (Swartbooi Nama) at Rehoboth, later at Salem, Ameib, and Franzfontein
- Kharoǃoan (Keetmanshoop Nama) under the leadership of Hendrik Tseib split from the Red Nation in February 1850 and settled at Keetmanshoop.

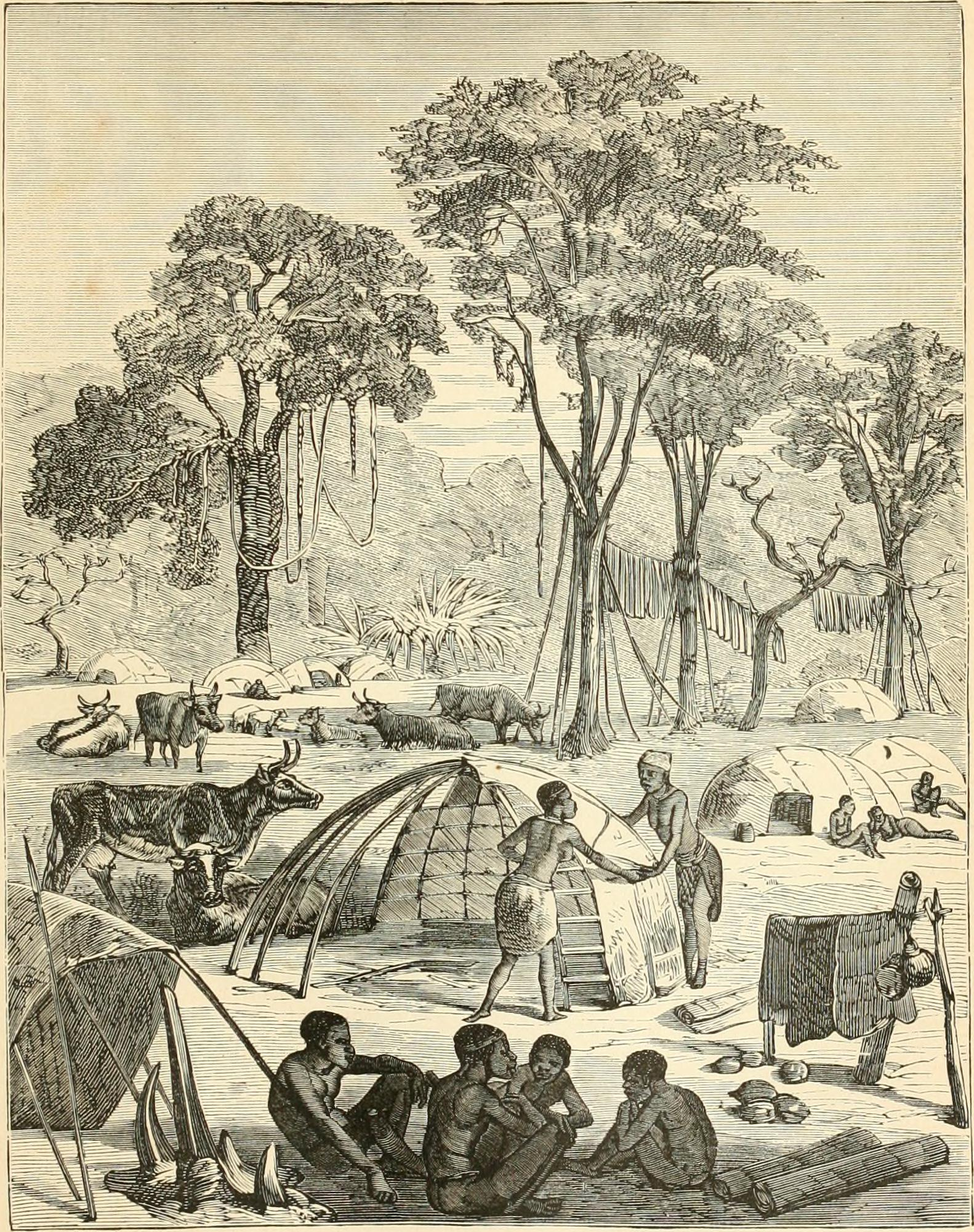
Khoekhoe huts

Among the Nama are also the Oorlams who are a southern Khoekhoe people of mixed-race ancestry that trekked northwards over the Orange River and where absorbed into the greater Nama identity. The Oorlams themselves are made up of five smaller clans:

- ǀAixaǀaen (Orlam Afrikaners), the first group to enter and permanently settle in Namibia. Their leader Klaas Afrikaner left the Cape Colony around 1770. The clan first built the fortress of ǁKhauxaǃnas, then moved to Blydeverwacht, and finally settled at Windhoek.
- ǃAman (Bethanie Orlam) subtribe settled at Bethanie at the turn of the eighteenth century.
- Kaiǀkhauan (Khauas Nama) subtribe formed in the 1830s, when the Vlermuis clan merged with the Amraal family. Their home settlement became Naosanabis (now Leonardville), which they occupied from 1840 onward. This clan ceased to exist after military defeat by Imperial German Schutztruppe in 1894 and 1896.
- ǀHaiǀkhauan (Berseba Orlam) subtribe formed in 1850, when the Tibot and Goliath families split from the ǃAman to found Berseba.
- ǀKhowesin (Witbooi Orlam) subtribe was the last to take up settlement in Namibia. They originated at Pella, south of the Orange River. Their home town became Gibeon.

These Nama inhabit the Great Namaqualand region of Namibia. There are also minor Nama clans that inhabit the Little Namaqualand regions south of the Orange River in north western South Africa.

=== Southern Khoekhoe (Cape Khoe) ===
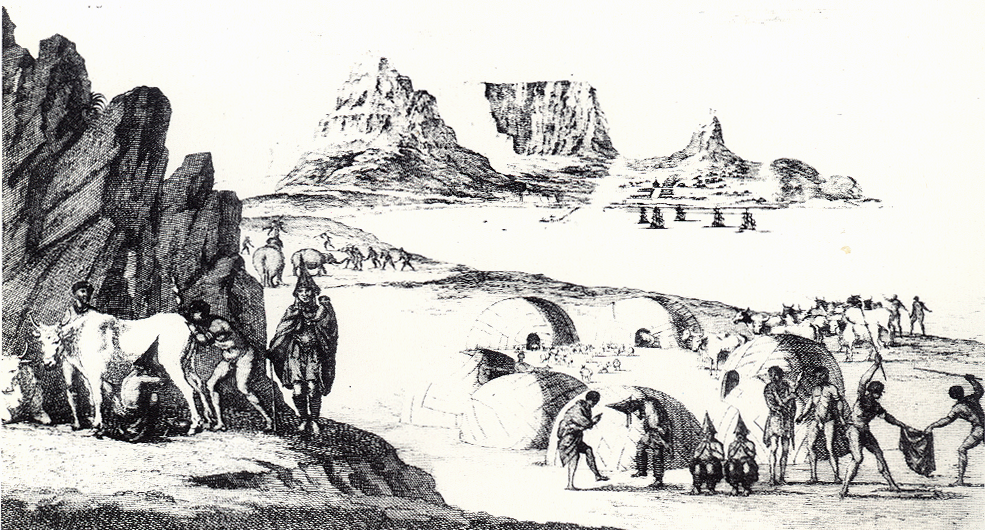
A Khoekhoe settlement in Table Bay, as depicted in an engraving in Abraham Bogaert's Historische Reizen, 1711

The southern Khoekhoe peoples (Sometimes incorrectly called the Cape Khoe due to the importance of the Cape of Good Hope) inhabit the Western Cape and Eastern Cape Provinces in the south western coastal regions of South Africa. They are divided into four subgroups: Eastern Cape Khoe, Central Cape Khoe, Western Cape Khoe and Peninsular Cape Khoe. Each of these subgroups are further divided into nations and subtribes who constitute an integral part of the Khoekhoe form of government.

=== The Eastern Cape Khoe ===
- Hoengeyqua
- Damasonqua
- Gonaqua

=== Central Cape Khoe ===
- Inqua (also called "Humcumqua")
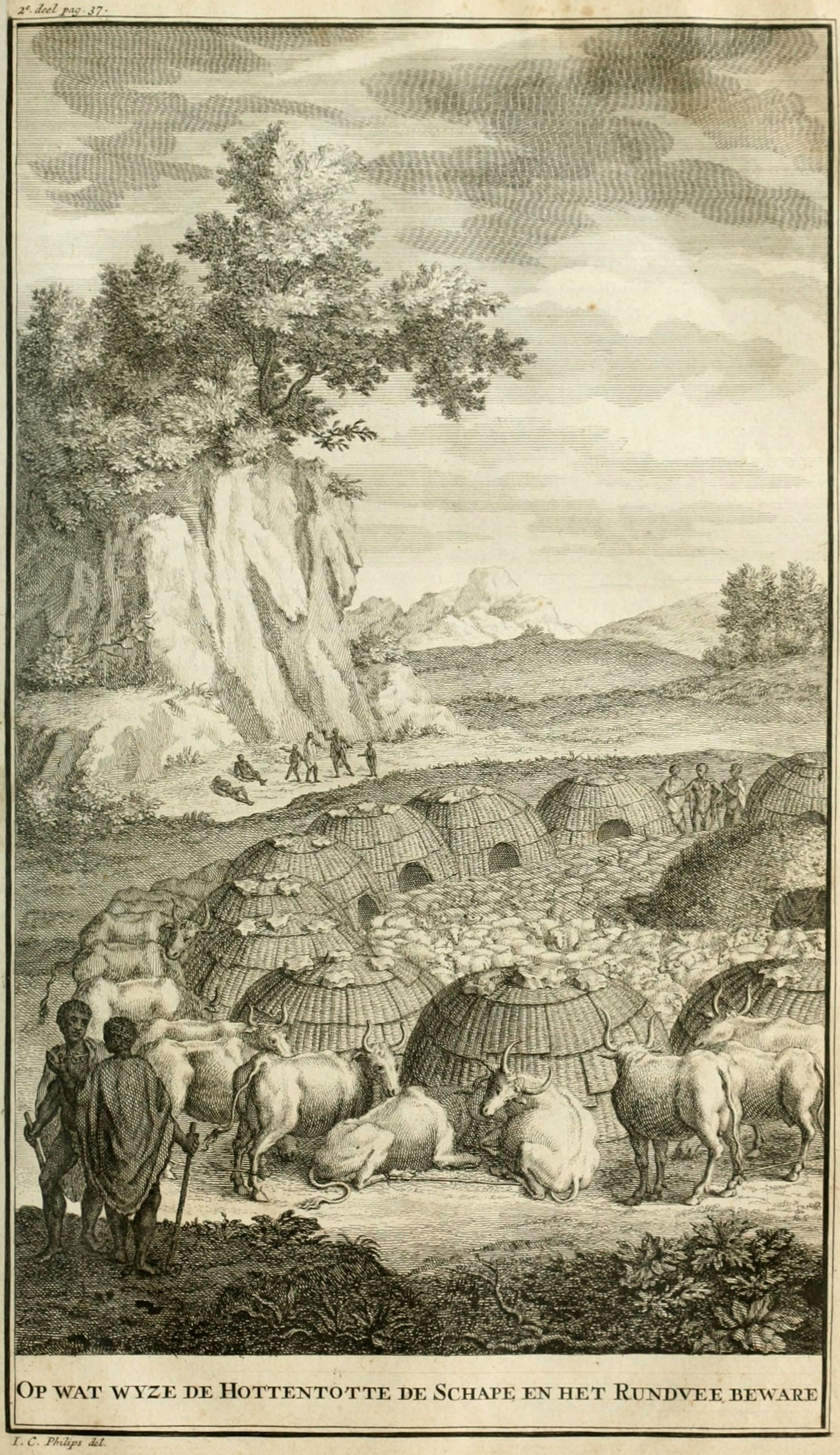
  Khoekhoe kraal, 1727
- Houtunqua
- Gamtobaqua (possible historical subgroup of the Houtunqua)
- Attaqua
- Gouriqua
- Chamaqua

=== Western Cape Khoe ===
- Chainouoqua
- Hawequa (also called "Obiqua". possible historical subgroup of the Chainouqua)
- Cochoqua
- Hessequa
- Chairiguriqua

=== Peninsular Cape Khoe ===
Goringhaiqua: The Goringhaiqua are a single tribal authority made from the two houses of the Goringhaikona and Gorachouqua.

== Early European theories about Khoekhoe origins ==
A commissioned Grammar and Dictionary of the Zulu Language, published in 1859, put forward the idea of an origin from Egypt that appears to have been popular at the time. The reasoning for this included the (supposed) distinctive Caucasian elements of the Khoekhoe's appearance, a "wont to worship the moon'", an apparent similarity to the antiquities of Old Egypt, and a "very different language" to their neighbours. The Grammar says that "the best philologists of the present day ... find marked resemblances between the two".

== See also ==
- Herero and Nama genocide
- Nama people
- San religion
- Coloureds
- Griqua people
- History of South Africa
- Khoisan
- Sarah Baartman (1789–1815), aka "Hottentot Venus", South African Khoekhoe woman exploited as a freak show attraction in Europe
