= Heinrich Schmelen =

19th-century German missionary and Bible translator

The Reverend Johann Heinrich Schmelen
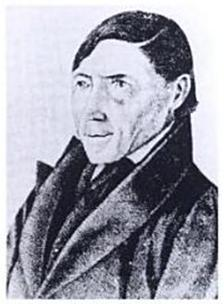

Personal details
- Born: Johann Hinrich Schmelen; 7 January 1776 Kassebruch, Bremen-Verden
- Died: 26 July 1848 (aged 72) Komaggas, Cape Colony

Johann Heinrich Schmelen (born Johann Hinrich Schmelen; 7 January 1776 – 26 July 1848) was a German missionary and linguist who worked in South Africa and South West Africa. Traveling through the area of today's northern South Africa and central and southern Namibia he founded the mission stations at Bethanie and Steinkopf and discovered the natural harbour at Walvis Bay. Together with his wife Zara he translated parts of the Bible into Khoekhoegowab (Damara/Nama) and published a dictionary.

== Early life and travel to Africa ==
Schmelen was born into a middle-class family on 7 January 1776 in Kassebruch, today a suburb of Hagen im Bremischen in the German state of Lower Saxony. To evade conscription he went to London where was influenced by pastors of the German congregation. He wanted to become a missionary and was advised to attend the missionaries' seminary of pastor Jänicke in Berlin.

After graduation he was sent to South Africa in 1811. He accompanied Christian Albrecht to Pella in the Northern Cape from where he traveled the Oranje to serve a number of small nomadic pastoral tribes.

== Foundation of Bethanie ==
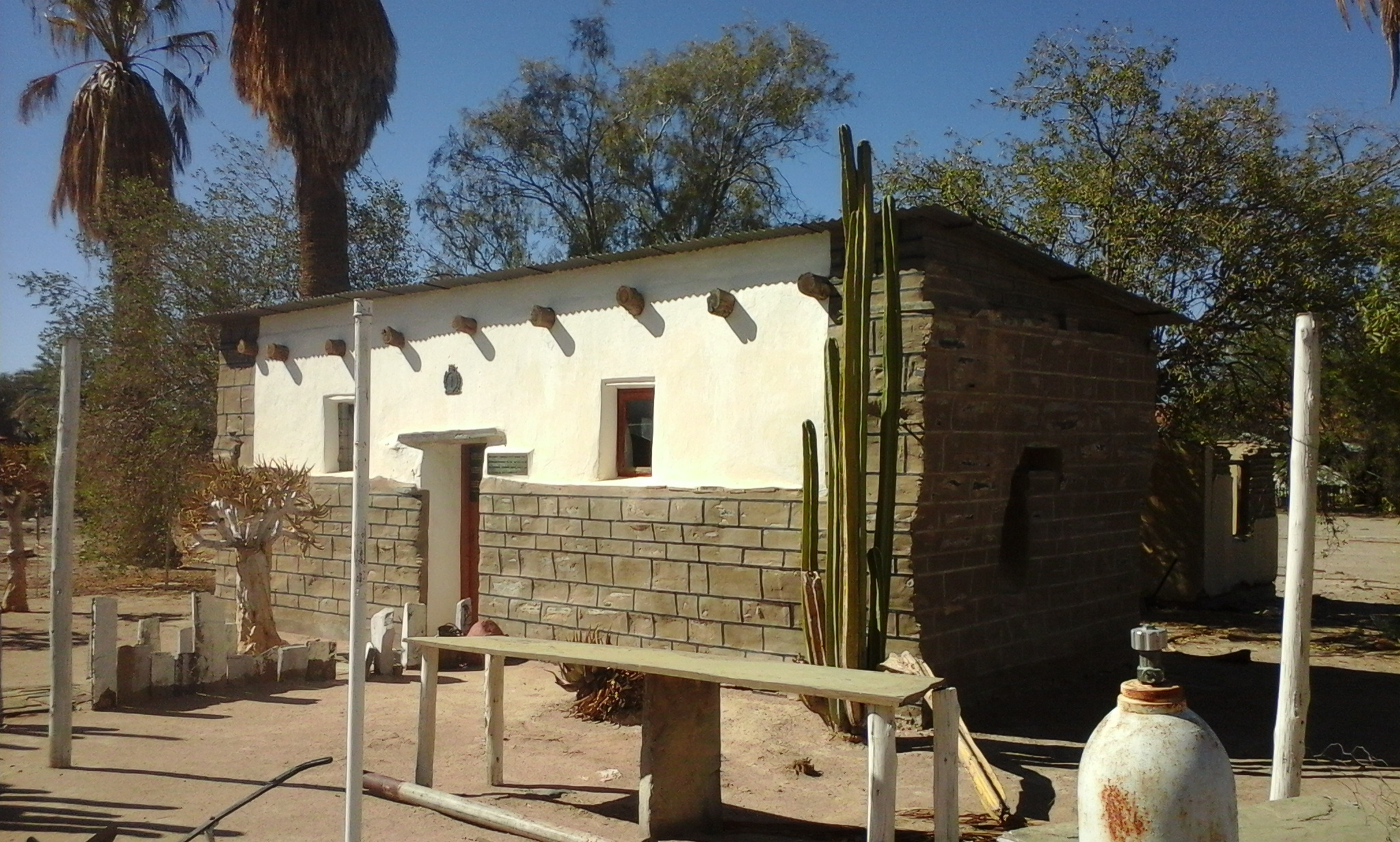
Schmelenhaus in Bethanie

In 1812 Schmelen was ordered to trek into Namaland to found a missionary station near the Atlantic coast. He joined a group of Nama and Orlam on their way to ǀUiǂgandes. They arrived in 1814, and Schmelen named the place Bethanie. He then traveled further north until approximately 22 degrees latitude but returned and founded a missionary station for Amraal Lambert's clan of the Kaiǀkhauan (Khauas Nama) people.

Schmelens cottage at Bethanie, erected in 1814 and a national monument since 1952, was long regarded as the oldest building in Namibia. Only later was discovered that the church and the pastor's house in Warmbad, both destroyed in 1811, were older than the Schmelenhaus, and that the fortification of ǁKhauxaǃnas predates all European constructions.

== Missionary journeys ==
Schmelen traveled across much of Namaland and visited numerous tribes. While visiting Cape Town in 1818 he received a letter from the London Missionary Society, ordering him not to return to Bethanie but to found a missionary station in Bysondermaid in Namaqualand (today Northern Cape province in South Africa). He named the place Steinkopf after Dr. Steinkopf, one of the London pastors of the German congregation.

One year after his arrival in Steinkopf a colleague took over the missionary work, and Schmelen returned to Bethanie. The Orlam there had in the meantime started to raid cattle of the Herero and accused Schmelen of wanting them to remain in poverty. He lost a large part of his followers; his general success with the Orlam community was poor. "I almost fell down to my knees begging them to come back to church, but they refused." he wrote about his experience. After a drought and a locust plague befell Bethanie, which was blamed on his anger towards the community, he closed the missionary station in 1822 and returned to the shore of the Oranje. At about this time he was instructed to translate the New Testament into the Nama language.

Schmelen set off to a second northwards journey in 1824 or 1825, again with the aim to find a hospitable place at the coast to improve logistics for the support of the missionaries in the hinterland. Amraal Lambert accompanied him on this trip. They followed the ephemeral Kuiseb River and made contact with the Topnaar Nama at Rooibank (Scheppmannsdorf during Imperial Germany's colonial rule of South-West Africa). In 1825 they reached the river mouth south of Walvis Bay and the natural harbour which was only used by whale hunters during winter time.

On his way back he met Jonker Afrikaner near Rehoboth and convinced him to convert to Christianity. In 1827 he visited Okahandja, the first European to do so.

== Family life and living conditions ==
After several years of criss-crossing the vast area of Namaland, Schmelen owned neither shoes nor clothes and dressed himself with hides until in 1818 he got the opportunity to travel to Cape Town to procure new essentials. In one of his letters from Bethanie he reported:

Being a rocky and stony place it wasn't easy to get about. I was not able to keep a horse in these conditions, and so I used an ox which was trained for riding. I took my Bible and a karos which I used by day as a saddle and as a bed by night. I crossed the vast areas of this land to preach the gospel. The Lord [...] blessed my feeble efforts so much that at times I forgot all about my hunger and thirst which I had to frequently endure on my journeys. My food was only a little meat. I had no bread, but the Lord strengthened me daily, so that by his grace I have endured.

During one of his travels through the Namibian interior in 1814, Schmelen married Zara (née Frederiks), who originated from Kookfontein. This happened "to the no little horror of his friends" because Zara was of Nama descent, one of the first natives he convinced to convert to Christianity. The London Missionary Society temporarily suspended Schmelen, following a rumour that their relation was "sinful", that is: that they were not married.

Interracial marriages between missionaries and indigenous women were common in those days and encouraged by the missionary societies to give the missionaries the opportunity to live an exemplary family life in their congregations, and also to acquire language competencies and local clan support. It was in fact Zara who did most of the work on his Bible translation, as he could not speak Damara/Nama anywhere near native level.

Four children emerged from this marriage, one son who died early, and three daughters, Hanna, who married Franz Heinrich Kleinschmidt, Johanna, and Friederike.

In 1830 Schmelen and his wife traveled to Cape Town again to have their translated works (the Four Gospels and the Catechism, as well as a dictionary) printed, and to equip themselves again. On the way back, his wife Zara died in April 1831 from exhaustion. He decided to stay in Komaggas and took over missionary work there. He married Elisabeth Maria, sister of missionary Jan Bam, in 1834, and died in Komaggas on 26 July 1848.
