= Dawid Boois =

Namibian politician and educator

Dawid Boois (born 13 January 1952 in Berseba) is a Namibian politician and educator.

Boois attended St Theresa Secondary School in Tses and Augustineum Secondary School in Windhoek. He later became a teacher and the principal of Ecumenical Community Secondary School in Berseba.

A member of SWAPO, Boois was a member of the National Assembly from 2000 before being appointed governor of the southern ǁKaras Region in 2004. He since then contested Berseba Constituency, where he became councillor in 2004 after winning the seat in the 2004 regional elections with 1,724 of the 3,591 votes cast. He was reelected in 2010 with 1,225 votes, and in 2015 with 1,774 votes,

Boois was involved in a controversy regarding the different factions of the traditional leadership of the ǀHaiǀKhaua (Berseba Orlam) subtribe of the Nama people. He supported a group contesting the legitimacy of the reunification of the Goliath and Isaak rival clans and tried to extend the 50-year-long split of the Berseba Orlam. Eventually Boois supported the unity of the tribe by reconciling with fellow former ǁKaras governor Stephanus Goliath early in 2011.

According to transparency documents released in 2003 while Boois was a member of the National Assembly, the Berseba-native is a director of Kaiseb Fishing. He also owns 8% of the shares in the company. He also owns over 15,000 shares in Southern Namibia Hake Fishing Industries alongside fellow SWAPO politician Willem Konjore. He also owns a restaurant and hotel in ǁKaras Region.
