= Schmelen =

Schmelen is a surname. Notable people with the surname include:

- Heinrich Schmelen (1776–1848), German missionary, linguist, and translator
- Zara Schmelen (c. 1793–1831), Southern African mission assistant and translator, wife of Heinrich
