= Moses Witbooi =

Captain of the ǀKhowesin (1808–1888

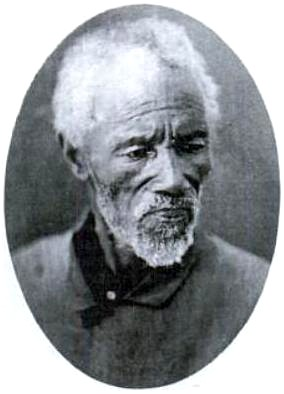
- Witbooi in 1876

Kaptein of the ǀKhowesin
- Reign: 31 December 1875 – 22 February 1888
- Predecessor: Kido Witbooi
- Successor: Hendrik Witbooi
- Born: 1808; Pella, South Africa
- Died: 22 February 1888 (aged 79–80); Gibeon, German South West Africa
- Khoekhoe language name: ǀGâbeb ǃA-ǁîmab

Moses Witbooi (Khoekhoe: ǀGâbeb ǃA-ǁîmab; 1808 – 22 February 1888) was the second chief of the Witbooi Nama or ǀKhowesin, a ruling clan of the Oorlam branch of the Nama people. He was the son of Kido Witbooi, founder of the clan. He became the de facto leader in 1870, but official chief only at his father's death on 31 December 1875. In the 1880s, he allied with Jan Jonker Afrikaner against the Herero people. Late in 1887 he was deposed by his son-in-law Paul Visser, who had him executed early the next year. His son Hendrik Witbooi soon after killed Visser and reunited the Oorlam under his rule.
