= Namaland =

Bantustan in South West Africa (1980–1989)

- 1980–1989
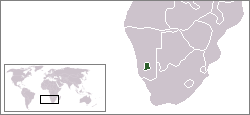
- Location of the Bantustan (green) within South West Africa (grey)
- Status: Bantustan; Second-tier authority
- Capital: Keetmanshoop
- History
  - Established: 1980
  - Re-integrated into Namibia: May 1989
- Currency: South African rand
Preceded by	Succeeded by
South West Africa	Namibia

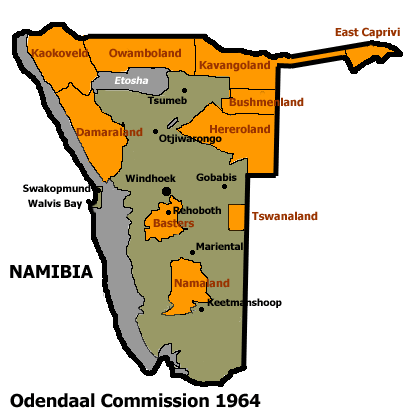
Allocation of land to Bantustans (orange) according to the Odendaal Plan. The protected areas and national parks are grey, the white-administered Police Zone is green. Namaland is the homeland in the South.

Namaland was a Bantustan and then later a non-geographic ethnic-based second-tier authority, the Representative Authority of the Namas, the in South West Africa (present-day Namibia), intended by the apartheid government to be a self-governing homeland for the Nama people. Namaland comprised an area of 2,156 km^{2} (832 sq mi) and was to accommodate the estimated 34,806 southern Namas of the South West African territory.

The term Namaland also covers a much broader region of southern Namibia which is the traditional home of the northern Nama people. Their language, Nama, is the only surviving dialect of the Khoekhoe language. The suffix -qua means “people” and can be added to the names of most Khoekhoe groups. The region of the Northern Cape south of the Orange River is called Namaqualand.

== Background ==
In the 1960s South Africa, which was administering South West Africa under a League of Nations mandate, came under increased international pressure regarding its minority White rule over the majority of Blacks. The solution envisaged by South Africa—the Odendaal Plan—was to separate the white and the non-white population, grant self-government to the isolated black territories, and thus make Whites the majority population in the vast remainder of the country. Moreover it was envisaged that by separating each ethnic group and confining people by law to their restricted areas, discrimination by race would automatically disappear.

The demarcated territories were called the Bantustans, and the remainder of the land was called the Police Zone. Forthwith, all non-white people employed in the Police Zone became migrant workers, and pass laws were established to police movement in and out of the Bantustans.

The combined territory of all Bantustans was roughly equal in size to the Police Zone. However, all Bantustans were predominantly rural and excluded major towns. All harbours, most of the railway network and the tarred road infrastructure, all larger airports, the profitable diamond areas and the national parks were situated in the Police Zone.

== Administrative history ==
=== Bantustan ===
For Southern Namibia the Odendaal Plan designated Namaland from four already existing native reserves, Berseba, Tses, the Krantzplatz reserve near Gibeon and the Soromas reserve near Bethanie, plus 165 white-owned farms. Generous offers from the administration to buy these farms from the White settlers lead to many voluntary sales but also raised farm prices in the Police Zone. The townlands of Gibeon were added, and formed the administrative capital of the Bantustan. This territory excluded the former Bondels Nama reserve, comprising c. 175,000 hectares (430,000 acres) around Warmbad. Its Nama inhabitants were to relocate to the new reserve.

Altogether, Namaland had a size of 2,156 km^{2} (832 sq mi). 34,806 Nama were estimated to live in the south of South West Africa in the 1960s; all of them were supposed to relocate to the new territory.

=== Representative authority (1980–1989) ===
Following the Turnhalle Constitutional Conference the system of Bantustans was replaced in 1980 by Representative Authorities which functioned on the basis of ethnicity only and were no longer based on geographically defined areas.

The Representative Authority of the Namas had executive and legislative competencies, being made up of elected Legislative Assemblies which would appoint Executive Committees led by chairmen.

As second-tier authorities, forming an intermediate tier between central and local government, the representative authorities had responsibility for land tenure, agriculture, education up to primary level, teachers' training, health services, and social welfare and pensions and their Legislative Assemblies had the ability to pass legislation known as Ordinances.

=== Transition to independence (1989–1990) ===
Namaland, like other homelands in South West Africa, was abolished in May 1989 at the start of the transition to independence.

== See also ==
- Apartheid
