= Oude Ram Afrikaner =

Leader of the Orlam Afrikaners (fl. 18th century)

Captain of the Orlam Afrikaners
- Reign: fl. 18th century
- Predecessor: Position established
- Successor: Klaas Afrikaner
- Born: Early 18th century Near Tulbagh, Dutch Cape Colony
- Died: c. 1760; Cape Town, Dutch Cape Colony

Oude Ram Afrikaner (early 18th century – around 1760) was the leader of a clan that later became known as the Orlam Afrikaners, a sub-group of the Orlam. The clan consisted of mixed-race descendants from indigenous Khoikhoi and slaves from Madagascar, India, and Indonesia. Members of this mixed race are today sometimes called African Creole people or Creole Africans, as well as Coloureds.

The group around Oude Ram was the first to refer to themselves not as being from a specific tribe but to use the continental description, African. This is how Oude Ram and his descendants got the surname Afrikaner, and their language the name Afrikaans. Only much later in the second half of the 19th century did the Cape Dutch adopt this attribution, too. The Khoi and mixed-race peoples became known, collectively, as Coloureds, a term which was introduced by the British administration.

There is not much known about the biography of Oude Ram and the Orlams' pre-1760 history. It is documented that his clan came in conflict with the Dutch East India Company. Subsequently, he and his son Afrikaner Afrikaner were banned from the Cape Colony and sentenced to life in prison. While Oude Ram probably died soon after the conviction, his son Afrikaner became one of the first prisoners of Robben Island in 1761. He died there on 25 June 1777. His other son, Klaas, was exonerated and led the clan from the Cape Colony to South West Africa in the 1770s.

Oude Ram Afrikaner was the first in the genealogy of the Orlam Afrikaners. After Oude Ram had died and his son Klaas trekked with the clan to South West Africa, the group dominated the area that today is central Namibia for almost 100 years. This rule and domination started some time after Klaas Afrikaner and his sons moved to South West Africa in the 1770s and founded the fortress ǁKhauxaǃnas at the end of the 18th century, and it ended with the death of Christian Afrikaner, Oude Ram's great grandson, in 1863.
