= Hendrina Afrikaner =

Namibian traditional ruler

Captain of the Orlam Afrikaners
- Reign: 2004 – 19 August 2011
- Successor: Eduard Afrikaner (2016)
- Born: 1952
- Died: 19 August 2011 (aged 58–59); B1 road, Namibia
- Burial: Okahandja

Hendrina Martha Afrikaner (1952 – 19 August 2011) was a Namibian traditional ruler who was captain of the Orlam Afrikaners, the first woman to occupy that position.

== Early life ==
Afrikaner was the great-granddaughter of Jan Jonker Afrikaner.

She grew up in Hoachanas and Okahandja where she attended the Augustineum.

== Career ==
Afrikaner worked as a nurse when she was in her twenties. After Namibia became independent she joined the Ministries of Education, and of Gender Equality and Child Welfare.

She became chief of the Afrikaner clan in 2004 and occupied that position until her death.

In 2016, Eduard Afrikaner (b. 1948) was elected as the chief.

== Death ==
Hendrina Afrikaner died on 19 August 2011 in a car accident between Keetmanshoop and Tses, and was buried next to Jan Jonker Afrikaner in Okahandja.
