= Babiana tritonioides =

Scientific classification
- Kingdom: Plantae
- Clade: Tracheophytes
- Clade: Angiosperms
- Clade: Monocots
- Order: Asparagales
- Family: Iridaceae
- Genus: Babiana
- Species: B. tritonioides

Binomial name
- Babiana tritonioides G.J.Lewis

Species of flowering plant

Babiana tritonioides is a perennial flowering plant and geophyte belonging to the genus Babiana. The species is endemic to the Northern Cape. It occurs from the southern Richtersveld to Komaggas and is threatened by overgrazing.
