= Warmbad =

Warmbad may refer to:

- Warmbad, Namibia, a settlement in southern Namibia.
- Bela Bela, a town in South Africa previously named and still commonly called Warmbad.
