= Berseba Constituency =

Electoral constituency in southern Namibia

Coordinates: 25°59′46″S 17°46′02″E

Berseba constituency (red) in the ǁKaras Region

Berseba is a constituency in the ǁKaras Region of Namibia. The main settlement is Berseba. As of 2020 the constituency had 6,659 registered voters.

Berseba constituency covers an area of 31,725 km^{2} (12,249 sq mi) and contains the Brukkaros crater and the settlements of Snyfontein, Helmeringhausen, Tses, Bethanie, and Goageb. It had a population of 10,589 in 2011, up from 9,064 in 2001. The first diamonds in Namibia were found in this area in 1898, while oil was found in 1929.

== Politics ==
Berseba Constituency is traditionally a stronghold of the South West Africa People's Organization (SWAPO) party. In the 2004 regional elections, former parliamentarian Dawid Boois (SWAPO) was elected with 1,724 of the 3,591 votes cast. Boois, by then governor of ǁKaras, was reelected in the 2010 regional elections with 1,225 votes. He defeated challengers Aron Lucas Stephanus of the Rally for Democracy and Progress (RDP, 558 votes), Regina Kuhlman of Democratic Turnhalle Alliance (DTA, 397 votes), Hendrik Christiaan Humphries of the Democratic Party of Namibia (DP, 296 votes) and Bernardt Barry Stephanus of Congress of Democrats (CoD, 126 votes).

Boois was again reelected in the 2015 regional elections with 1,774 votes. Diederik Isaak Vries of the DTA obtained 901 votes, and Trougot Metusalag Kaffer of the RDP obtained 148 votes. The 2020 regional election was won by Jeremias Gooieman of the Landless People's Movement (LPM, a new party registered in 2018). He obtained 1,822 votes. The SWAPO candidate, Steve Sensus Ovambo, came second with 1,127 votes.
