= Zara Schmelen =

Southern African linguist and translator

- Born: Zara Hendrichs; 1793; Steinkopf, Dutch Cape Colony
- Died: 1831 (aged 37–38)
- Burial place: Old Komaggas Cemetery, Komaggas, Namakwa District Municipality
- Occupations: Linguist, translator
- Years active: 1814-1831
- Notable work: Translation of the New Testament of the Bible into the Khoikhoi language
- Spouse: Heinrich Schmelen (1814-1831)
- Children: Three daughters, one son

Zara Schmelen (c. 1793 – 1831) was a Southern African missionary's wife, born in the Cape Colony but later moved to Namaqualand. She was the primary translator of the New Testament of the Bible into the Khoikhoi language, assisted by her husband Heinrich Schmelen.

== Biography ==
Zara Schmelen, originally Zara Hendrichs, was born in the Cape Colony town of Steinkopf (now part of the Northern Cape in South Africa) around 1793. She was baptised by the German missionary Heinrich Schmelen on 6 February 1814 alongside her sister Leetije, as one of the first four members of his congregation. Heinrich wrote of the sisters, saying that they were descended from the people of Namaqualand (bordering modern day South Africa and Namibia), and that while Zara had been practising as a Christian for some time, it was a more recent occurrence for Leetije. He encouraged both of them to become mission assistants.

She moved to Namaqualand in 1814, alongside Heinrich and a large group from his congregation to set up a new mission there. After his servant fell ill, Heinrich employed Zara, and they were subsequently married. Zara was around 20 years old at this point, while Heinrich was about 20 years older. Upon learning of the marriage, Heinrich was temporarily suspended by the London Missionary Society, but this was cancelled after he defended himself through correspondence. Zara and Heinrich would work together on the translation of the New Testament of the Bible into the Khoikhoi language. Her husband later took credit for the work, but admitted that he had limited knowledge of the language it was translated into.

Prior to her death in 1831, Zara and Heinrichs had three daughters and a son. Their descendant Ursulu Trüper later wrote a book in 2006 about Zara's life working in the missions of southern Africa, entitled The Invisible Woman: Zara Schmelen, African Mission Assistant at the Cape and in Namaland.
