= Oorlams Creole =

Afrikaans dialect of Southern Africa

Oorlans
- Native to: South Africa
- Native speakers: 32,000 (2006)
- Language family: Afrikaans creole?: Oorlans

Language codes
- ISO 639-3: oor
- Glottolog: oorl1238

Oorlams (also: Oorlands, Oorlans) is a dialect of Afrikaans spoken in the Republic of South Africa and Namibia, by the Oorlam people.

It is considered to be either an Afrikaans-based creole language or a dialect of Afrikaans proper.

Oorlams has many elements from Khoi languages.

== See also ==
- Historical dialects of Afrikaans
