= Immaculate Conception Cathedral, Pella =

Coordinates: 29.0315°S 19.1540°E

Immaculate Conception Cathedral
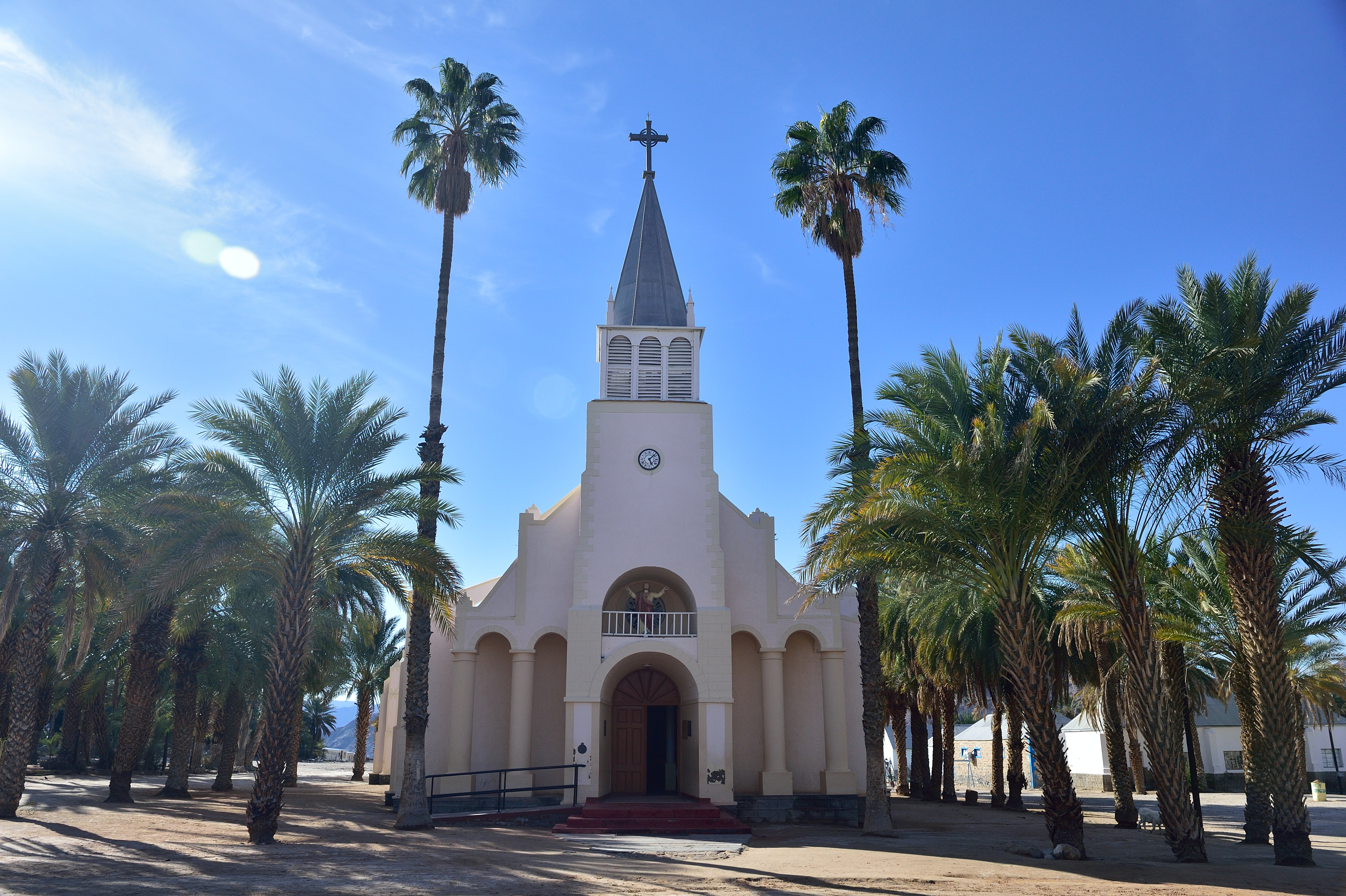
- Catholic cathedral in Pella
- Immaculate Conception Cathedral
- Location: Pella
- Country: South Africa
- Denomination: Roman Catholic Church

The Immaculate Conception Cathedral is a religious building belonging to the Roman Catholic Church and is located in the town of Pella in the region of Namakwa in the Northern Cape (Noord-Kaap) in South Africa, near the border with neighboring Namibia.

Stresses since it is the seat of the bishop of the diocese of Keimoes-Upington (Dioecesis Keimoesanus-Upingtonensis) which was created in 1951 by the bull Suprema Nobis of Pope Pius XII.

Work on its construction was completed in 1895, and follows the Roman or Latin rite.

== See also ==
- Roman Catholicism in South Africa
