= Kido Witbooi =

Kaptein of the ǀKhowesin (c. 1780–1875)

Kaptein of the ǀKhowesin
- Reign: 1805 – 31 December 1875
- Predecessor: Position established
- Successor: Moses Witbooi
- Born: c. 1780; Pella, Dutch Cape Colony
- Died: 31 December 1875 (aged 95)
- Khoekhoe language name: ǂA-ǁêib ǃGâmemab

Cupido Witbooi, variations: Kido and Kiwitti Witbooi, (Khoekhoe: ǂA-ǁêib ǃGâmemab; c. 1780 – 31 December 1875) was the first Kaptein of the ǀKhowesin (Witbooi Nama), a subtribe of the Oorlam of Namibia.

Witbooi was born in Pella, South Africa in 1780 where several small clans had moved from Cape Town in the second half of the 18th century. His father, Gamab, and his mother, U-eis, belonged to different tribes. At the time of their marriage the respective tribal councils agreed to merge into one larger group and decided that Gamab's and U-eis' first-born son should assume the chieftaincy of the united clan. Thus when Kido came of age in 1805, the councils made him leader of the ǀKhowesin.

Under his leadership the clan trekked first to Griqualand and then, around 1810, across the Oranje to Namaqualand in South West Africa. Around 1850 Witbooi and his clan had been invited by Jonker Afrikaner to travel to Windhoek. Their fellow Nama chiefs feared that an alliance of Jonker Afrikaner and Kido Witbooi, both admired for their intelligence, would diminish their own influence in South-West Africa. ǁHawoben chief Hendrik Hendricks sent a message to chief ǁOaseb of the Khaiǁkhaun asking him to stop Kido. Yet when ǁOaseb replied, nobody in the ǁHawoben clan could read. Kido passed both territories undisturbed and reached Khaxa-tsûs in 1863, which he renamed Gibeon.

Kido Witbooi died on 31 December 1875. He was married to ǀGâbes and to ǀU-khoms. He had at least 2 children: Johanna (born 1868) and Moses Witbooi (born 1808) who succeeded him as Kaptein of the ǀKhowesin. Gibeon has been the home town of the Witbooi Nama ever since.
