= Klaas Afrikaner =

Captain of the Orlam Afrikaners (before 1760–after 1800)

Captain of the Orlam Afrikaners
- Reign: 1760–c. 1800
- Predecessor: Oude Ram Afrikaner
- Successor: Jager Afrikaner
- Born: Before 1760
- Died: After 1800
- Khoekhoe language name: ǃGaruhamab

Klaas Afrikaner (Khoekhoe: ǃGaruhamab; before 1760 – after 1800) was the second Captain of the Orlam Afrikaners, first in the Dutch Cape Colony and later in South West Africa. Klaas became leader of his tribe after his father Oude Ram died in Cape Town at around 1760.

Under his leadership the Afrikaners left the Cape Colony in the 1770s and moved northwards into the area that is today southern Namibia. This happened at first with the consent, possibly even under the order, of the South African Cape Government. Later he is credited as one of the founders of Namibia's first systematic settlement in an engineering sense, ǁKhauxaǃnas. This settlement was built as a hidden retreat and a fortress to fend off possible pursuits by the Cape authorities, indicating that by then he had lost whatever mandate he might have had to execute military actions in South-West Africa. At around 1800 he handed over the chieftainship to his son Jager Afrikaner.
