= Jager Afrikaner =

Captain of the Orlam Afrikaners (c. 1769 – 1823)

Captain of the Orlam Afrikaners
- Reign: 1795 – 18 August 1823
- Predecessor: Klaas Afrikaner
- Successor: Jonker Afrikaner
- Born: c. 1769
- Died: 18 August 1823 (aged 53–54); Blydeverwacht
- Khoekhoe language name: ǀHomǀaramab

Jager Afrikaner (Khoekhoe: ǀHomǀaramab; c. 1769 – 18 August 1823) was the third Captain of the Orlam people in South West Africa, succeeding his father Klaas Afrikaner at around 1800. Before converting to Christianity through the missionary efforts of Robert Moffat, Afrikaner and his followers were considered notorious bandits. He was one of the founders of Namibia's first systematic settlement in an engineering sense, ǁKhauxaǃnas. After his death in 1823 his son Jonker Afrikaner succeeded him as Captain of the Afrikaner Orlams.

== Biography ==
Jager Afrikaner was born around 1769 in a region of southern Africa now part of Namibia. He was the son of Klaas Afrikaner, and a member of the Orlam ethnic group. Klaas and his sons would join farmer Petrus Pienaar on cattle rustling trips to the interior of the country. They joined Pienaar in settling to the Hantam area in 1790, with Jager succeeding his father five years later as captain.

Tensions increased between the Orlam and Pienaar from 1793 onwards, resulting that Pienaar was murdered by Jager Afrikaner in March 1796 following a quarrel. The Orlam under Jager fled to the islands of the Orange River and began raiding local settlements. Following a raid into the Dutch Cape Colony and the death of a white farmer, Jager was outlawed in 1799. Local farmers could not be encouraged to pursue Jager, but instead formed alliances which eventually led to the formation of the Griqua people in combined defence against Jager and his allies.

In 1803, Jager led the Orlam north, migrating the Cape Dutch language north of the Orange River. By 1806, he had given up the raider's life, instead seeking to become a leader of a respectable settlement. He allowed Christian missionaries to preach in his area, and followed them when they moved on eventually settling east of Warmbad. This peaceful period ended in 1810, when Jager led an attack on the London Missionary Society at Pella following the illegal sale of some of the Orlam's cattle. They continued to raid the local area until the intervention of a German Christian missionary in 1815, who converted Jager and his brother Hendrik to Christianity.

Jager was taught to read and write by other missionaries like Robert Moffat, and adopted the Christian name of Christiaan. In February 1819, he travelled to the Cape Colony to petition Lord Charles Somerset to set aside the outlaw charge. When the missionaries left the Orlam, Jager adopted the position of religious teacher and leader. Jager died in 1823, a week after his father. Jager's second son, Jonker Afrikaner, succeeded him.

== Sources ==
- Ross, Andrew C. (1998). Biographical dictionary of Christian missions. New York: Macmillan Reference USA.
- Verwey, E. J., ed. (1995). New Dictionary of South African Biography. Pretoria, South Africa: HSRC Publishers. ISBN 978-0-79691-648-8.
