= Berseba =

Berseba ǃAutsawises
- Village
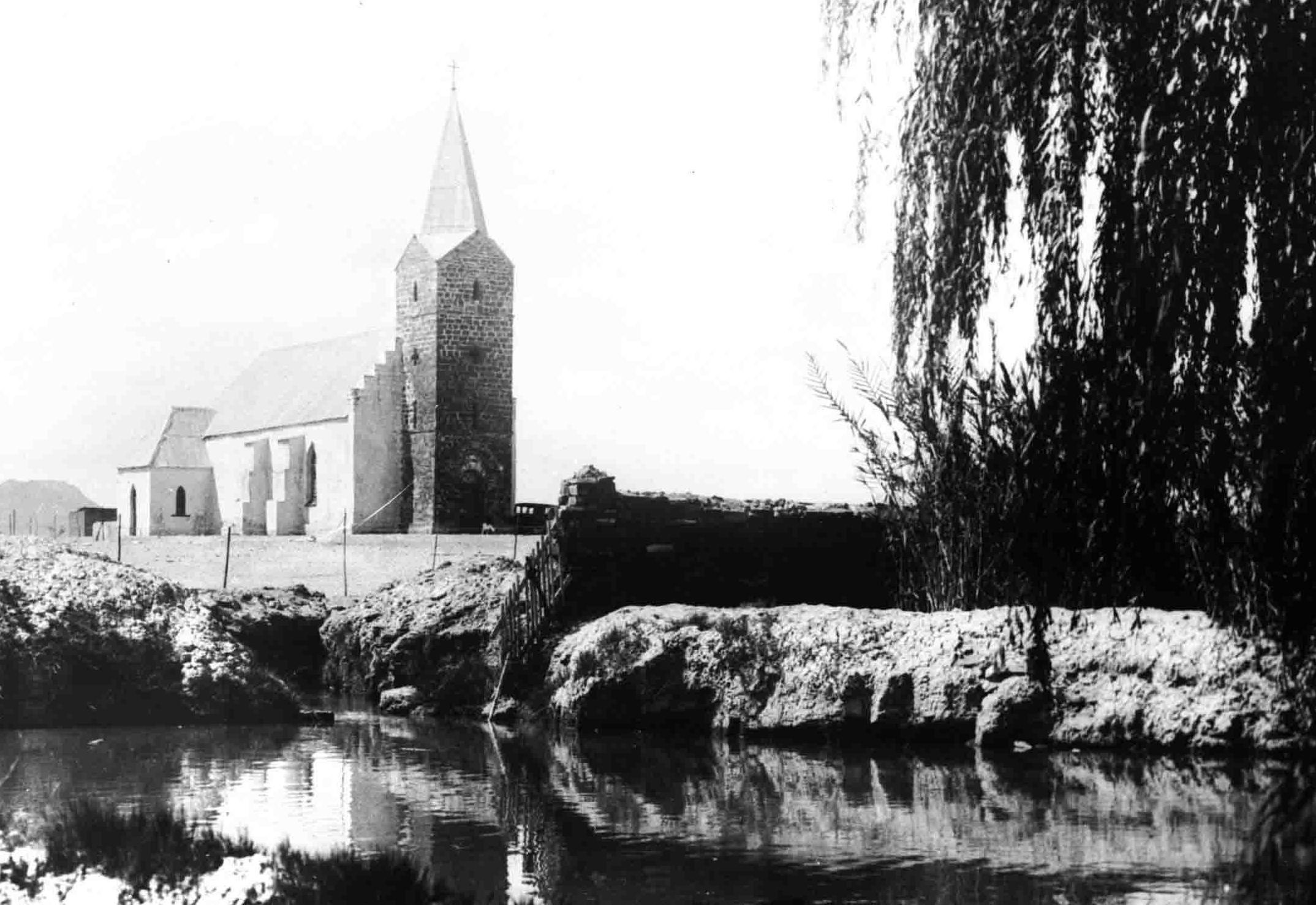
- Lutheran church in Berseba during German colonial times
- Nickname: The smile on the face of Brukkaros
- Location in Namibia
- Coordinates: 25°58′S 17°46′E
- Country: Namibia
- Region: ǁKaras Region
- Constituency: Berseba Constituency
- Founded: 1850
- Elevation: 3,038 ft (926 m)

Population (2023)
  - Total: 992
- Time zone: UTC+2 (SAST)
- Climate: BWh

Berseba (Khoekhoe: ǃAutsawises) is a village in the ǁKaras Region of southern Namibia. It is situated near the Brukkaros Mountain, a tourist destination. Berseba had 992 inhabitants in 2023.

== Geography ==
Berseba is situated 100 km (62 mi) north-west of Keetmanshoop near the Brukkaros Mountain, a famous tourist destination. It is the district capital of the Berseba electoral constituency.

Historical population
Year	Pop.	±% p.a.
2011	784	—
2023	992	+1.98%

== History ==
The first people to permanently settle at this place, then known under its Khoikhoi name ǃAutsawises, were a group of Oorlam herder clans from the Cape Province, driven across the Orange River by encroaching European settlers and the law enforcement of the Dutch East India Company. They arrived in the area of Berseba in 1812. In 1850 their patriarch Paul Goliath established himself as independent leader of this community that subsequently became known as the "Berseba Oorlam" (Khoekhoe: ǀHai-ǀkhaua).

The foundation of Berseba is recorded on 17 October 1850 when Rhenish Missionary Samuel Hahn founded the missionary station and gave it a biblically inspired name. In 1857 a church was built.

== People ==
Since the establishment of the chieftainship of the Berseba Oorlam it has been held by the Goliath and Isaak clans who often were in dispute about the succession. In the 1960s the two clans split over the leadership issue and only reunited in April 2010. Today, Kaptein Johannes Isaak is the traditional leader of the ǀHai-ǀkhaua.

== Development and Infrastructure ==
The first diamond in Namibia was found in this area in 1898, and oil explorations were conducted in 1900 and 1929, though neither led to substantial industrial development. The settlement is riddled with poverty, substance abuse, and crime. It features a secondary school, the Ecumenical Community School, which was declared "unfit to serve as an educational institution" in 2010 and has since been abandoned.

Berseba is connected by road to Tses (MR98), Bethanie (D3901 and D3905), Asab (D3903), Helmeringhausen (D554) and Keetmanshoop (D531), as well as to the Brukkaros tourist site (D3904).

== Politics ==
Upon Namibian independence Berseba was governed by a seven-seat village council. The first local elections run in Namibia, the 1992 local elections, was won by SWAPO which obtained 355 votes and gained four seats. The Democratic Turnhalle Alliance (DTA) came second with 234 votes and three seats. The 1998 local authority elections saw a similar result. SWAPO again obtained four seats with 217 votes, DTA got the remaining thee seats with 138 votes. In the 2004 local authority elections, SWAPO won the election again, this time competing for only five seats in a downsized village council. It gained three council seats and obtained 260 votes. One seat each was obtained by the (DTA) and the Congress of Democrats (CoD) with 99 and 91 votes, respectively.

In the 2010 local authority election Berseba was one of a few local authorities in Namibia where an opposition party obtained more votes for the village council than SWAPO when the DTA defeated SWAPO 221 votes to 200. No other party participated in the election for the Berseba Village Council. The 2015 local authority election was narrowly won by SWAPO party which gained three seats (266 votes). The DTA finished second and gained the remaining two seats (200 votes). In the 2020 local authority election the Landless People's Movement (LPM, a new party registered in 2018) won with 278 votes and gained two seats. SWAPO was the runner-up with 211 votes and also two sets. The remaining council seat went to the Popular Democratic Movement (PDM, the new name of the DTA since 2017) with 104 votes.
