= Pella, South Africa =

Pella
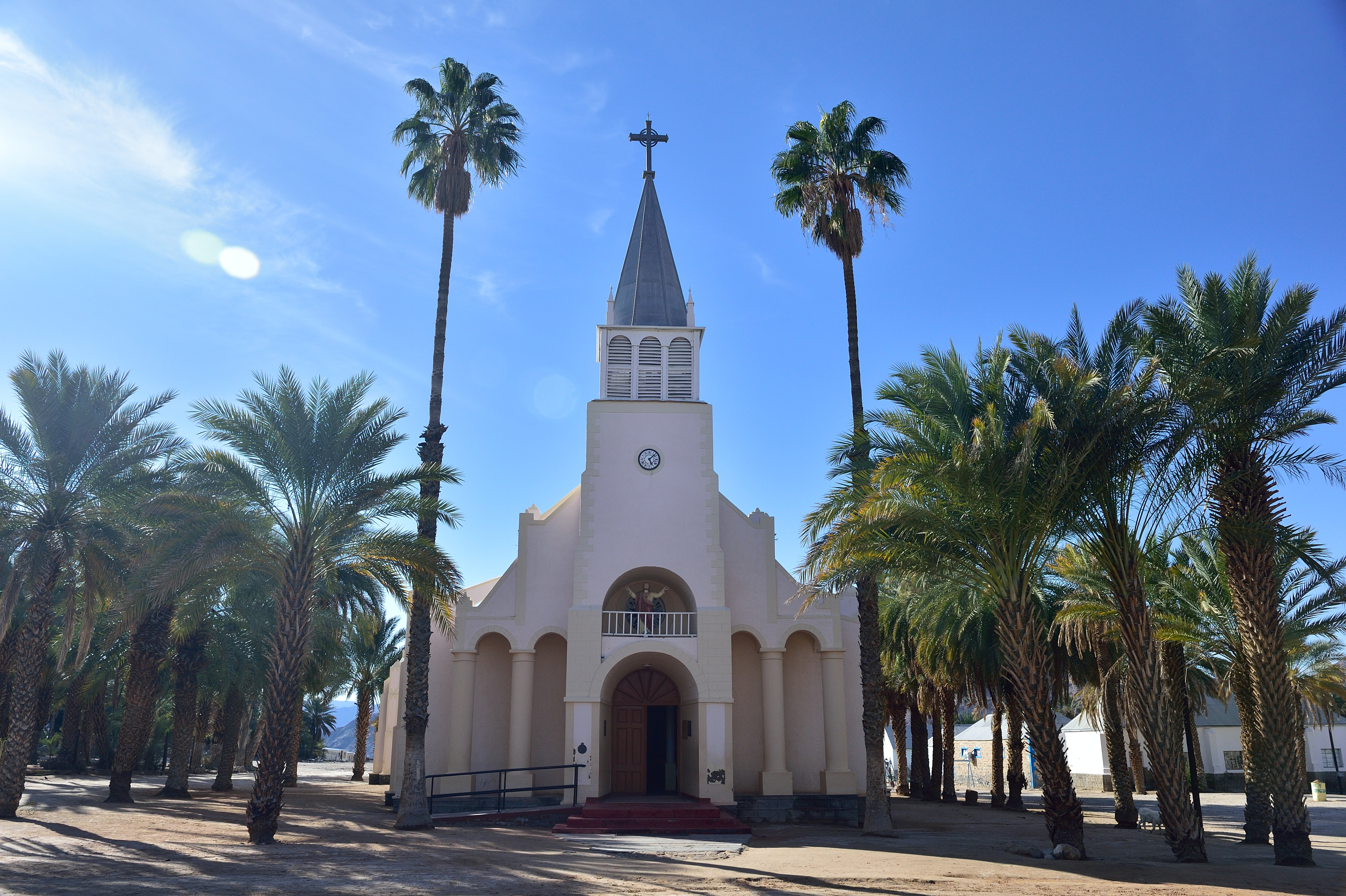
- Cathedral in Pella

- Location within Northern Cape Location within South Africa
- Coordinates: 29°02′S 19°09′E
- Country: South Africa
- Province: Northern Cape
- District: Namakwa
- Municipality: Khâi-Ma

Area
  - Total: 477.83 km^{2} (184.49 sq mi)

Population (2011)
  - Total: 2,470
  - Density: 5.17/km^{2} (13.4/sq mi)

Racial makeup (2011)
  - Black African: 2.8%
  - Coloured: 96.1%
  - Indian/Asian: 0.2%
  - White: 0.4%
  - Other: 0.5%

First languages (2011)
  - Afrikaans: 97.5%
  - Other: 2.5%
- Time zone: UTC+2 (SAST)
- Postal code (street): 8891
- PO box: 8891
- Area code: 054

Pella is an oasis in Namakwa (Bushmanland) in the Northern Cape province of South Africa. Earlier known as Cammas Fonteyn, the spring was used by a nearby stronghold of San people. In 1776 a South African Dutch farmer called Coenraad Feijt settled there and lived in harmony with the San despite their fondness for raiding the cattle of the Dutch farmers in the Hantam. A nearby farm called Aggeneys later became the site of the modern mining town of that name.

== Establishing the Mission Station ==
In 1814 a missionary called Christian Albrecht moved with his assistants and converts to Cammas Fonteyn, having left Namibia where the Orlam Chief, Jager Afrikaner, had been persecuting them. He founded a mission station and renamed it Pella after the ancient town in Macedonia that became a refuge for persecuted Christians from the Romans. Other famous missionaries that visited Pella during the early years were John Campbell, Heinrich Schmelen and Robert Moffat.

The tenure of the London Missionary Society (LMS) at Pella was intermittent and the mission station was abandoned on numerous occasions. This was largely because of the extremely harsh desert conditions, but on one occasion the LMS abandoned the mission station after one of the priests had been murdered by the San. During these periods of abandonment, the Basters and San continued to use the oasis.

George Thompson, the traveller, arrived in a distressed state at Pella in 1824. He had come from Cape Town and found the mission deserted. His party had sufficient water but no food whatsoever. Luckily he discovered that Mr Bartlett, the resident missionary, had moved the mission station to t’Kams which was 32 kilometres to the west. Thompson travelled to t’Kams and was hospitably received.,

Thompson reported that when the full congregation was collected at Pella, they amount to about 400 souls; but the severe droughts, and consequent failure of pasturage, force them occasionally to disperse themselves in divisions over the country wherever a spring of water exists with grass in the vicinity for their flocks. As soon as rain falls, the pastures at Pella will instantly spring up and the scattered divisions of the people will again be re-assembled.

In 1855 a surveyor named Moffat (not to be confused with various Missionaries named Moffat) reported having found one Francois Gabriel living in the abandoned mission buildings; Gabriel was a Frenchman married to a Baster; he subsequently left and moved to Namaqualand towards the west.

Edward John Dunn, the geologist, found Pella abandoned again in September 1871. He reported the charred remains of fires and the bleaching bones around the oasis – these were from the cattle raided by the San from the Hantam. The San, who were hunter gatherers, used to raid the pastoralists’ cattle and consequently were hunted like wild animals by the Dutch farmers, the Basters and the Khoikhoi alike.

== Building of the Church ==
In 1872 drought again forced the LMS out of Pella and they abandoned the mission station permanently. It was reoccupied in 1878 when Father Gaudeul, a Roman Catholic missionary from the Society of the Holy Ghost, settled at Pella. After some time, the intense heat and deprivation overwhelmed him and he returned to France.

Hearing of Father Gaudeul’s ordeal, a 23-year-old priest, Father JM Simon of the Oblates of St. Francis de Sales, volunteered to make a fresh start at Pella. He arrived in 1882 with no command of any of the local languages. He made friends with the San who were naturally wary of strangers. After he had struggled alone for two years, other priests joined Father Simon from France but the heat and the loneliness drove them all back to France until the arrival of Brother Leo Wolf in 1885. Together with Father Simon, he was to serve the community of Pella for more than fifty years.

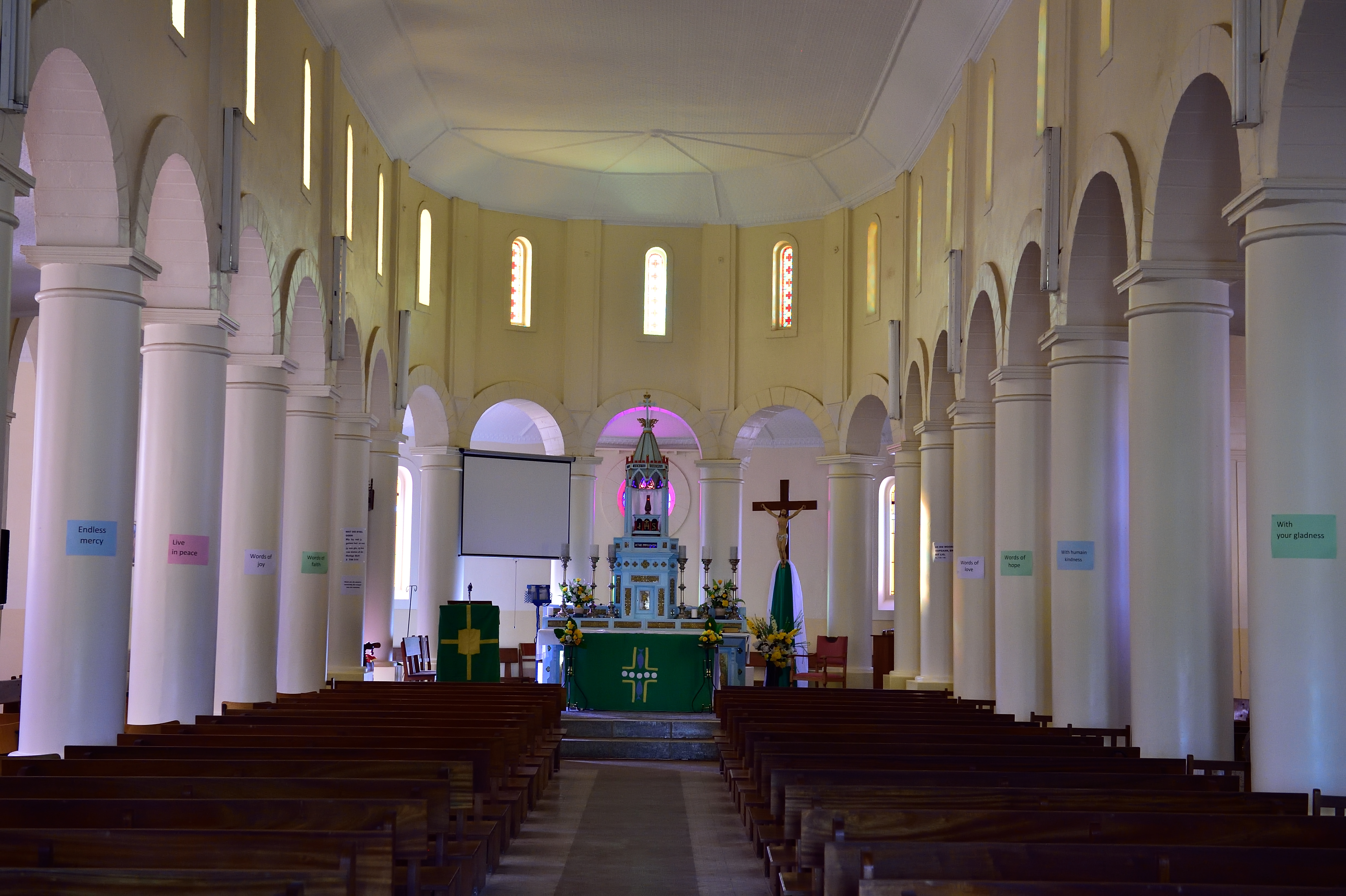
Inside the cathedral at Pella.

Having established gardens and planted crops, they began to build a church. Not having any funds to employ an architect, they realized that the church would have had to be the fruit of their own labour. Without building plans or knowledge of architecture or building, they relied heavily on a copy of the Encyclopedie des Arts et Metiers, regularly referring to the chapter on bricklaying. Inexperienced at building, they learnt the trade as they built the church in its Roman and Gothic style, with flying buttresses and fifty-two narrow windows to let in just enough light. The church has two side chapels, which extend beyond the nave and give the church the appearance of a cross. The four extremities of this cross each have a star-shaped window with blue and red stained glass. The church is crowned by the hexagonal wooden spire. The tower clock, bell, main altar, as well as the altars for the two chapels were imported as gifts from Father Brisson, the founder of the Oblates of St Francis de Sales. Many wooden fittings, including the spiral staircase and large steeple crucifix was carefully carved out of locally-grown willow wood. Father Simon used his pocket knife to painstakingly carve a statue of the body of Christ, which was attached to a crucifix and still adorns the cathedral. The workmen, being missionaries with other duties such as preaching, catechizing and tending to their gardens and other maintenance of the mission, took seven years to complete the building. The completed Immaculate Conception Cathedral was consecrated on 15 August 1895 by Bishop Rooney, coadjutor of the Cape, in a magnificent celebration never been seen or even imagined in the wilderness of Pella.

In the winter of 1905, the priests and some members of the congregation installed a large wooden cross on the peak of each of the three mountain tops surrounding Pella. In 1975 these iconic crosses, weathered and worn, were replaced by aluminium crosses, which can still be seen on the mountain peaks around the village today.

By the end of the century, Father Simon had been consecrated as a bishop and was appointed the first Vicar Apostolic of the Orange River. Brother Wolf was ordained as a priest after many years service. In 1932 Bishop Simon celebrated the fiftieth anniversary of his arrival. For the occasion, the church’s steeple was renovated and its wooden cross replaced with a metal cross. The celebration was too much for Bishop Simon and he died and was buried in the church that he had built. Father Wolf died in 1947 at the age of eighty-one and was also buried in the church. The permanent community and their established farming of today are primarily attributable to these two men.

== Today ==
The oasis of Pella is only a few kilometres south of the Orange River, a perennial river that flows towards the Atlantic Ocean in the west. It is situated at the base of the stark Great Pella Mountains and, although the desert is dry and dusty, the area is known for its gemstones such as malachite, jasper and rose quartz.

The cathedral is surrounded by date palm trees and the mission has a date plantation, bearing dates that are harvested and sold annually. In summer the average temperature is about 40°C and, although there may be no rain for years on end, groundwater is accessible, and there is an organic vegetable garden project with an attached aquaponics system, with the vegetables being sold in the community. The current settlement, which still largely consists of the descendants of the mission station converts that settled there in the nineteenth century, has socioeconomic struggles.

Pella has a primary school and public library, and through the generous funding of local businesses, there is an after school facility for children, with a soup kitchen, providing a daily, cooked meal. Many Pella people are employed at the nearby mines of Aggeneys and Gamsberg, the date farm at Klein Pella, as well as the grape farm near the Orange river. Others continue livestock farming on a small scale on the communal lands of Pella. The Nama culture is being kept alive by colourful, traditional dance groups, who perform passionately at special occasions and festivals, such as the popular Nama festival Pella hosts annually.

In the early years, there was a windmill near the church, pumping fresh water from the very high water table of the area, into a well. For many years, people collected water for their households there and the water was led to the gardens of the Mission. In later years, as a result of the improved infrastructure of municipal water supply, more households had access to running water, in or closer to their homes. The windmill did not seem to serve a purpose any longer and was removed and the well filled up. In 1983, during a small church service, three of the columns towards the back of the church collapsed, together with a section of the roof, which the columns supported. Fortunately nobody was hurt in this incident. When engineers subsequently assessed the whole building, they discovered the groundwater drainage system that had been installed when the church was built. They realized that, with the removal of the windmill, this drainage system became dysfunctional. For many years, water had dammed up under the church building and started seeping high into its structure, finally causing the partial collapse thereof. The Gold Fields Foundation generously supported the renovation of the whole building and reinstalled the underground water drainage system, which is now powered by a solar panel. The beautifully restored cathedral was reopened in November 1985.

There is a small museum near the church, bearing evidence of the history of Pella. The museum is maintained by the nuns, who are very happy to open its doors for interested visitors.

The Catholic Mission station at Pella has been declared a provincial heritage site, as recognized by the South African Heritage Resources Agency, the body responsible for the protection of South Africa's cultural heritage.
