= Warmbad, Namibia =

Warmbad Aixa-aibes Nisbett Bath
- Settlement
- Location in Namibia
- Coordinates: 28°27′S 18°44′E
- Country: Namibia
- Region: ǁKaras Region
- Constituency: Karasburg Constituency
- Founded: 1806
- Elevation: 2,333 ft (711 m)

Population (2012)
  - Total: 1,200
- Time zone: UTC+2 (South African Standard Time)

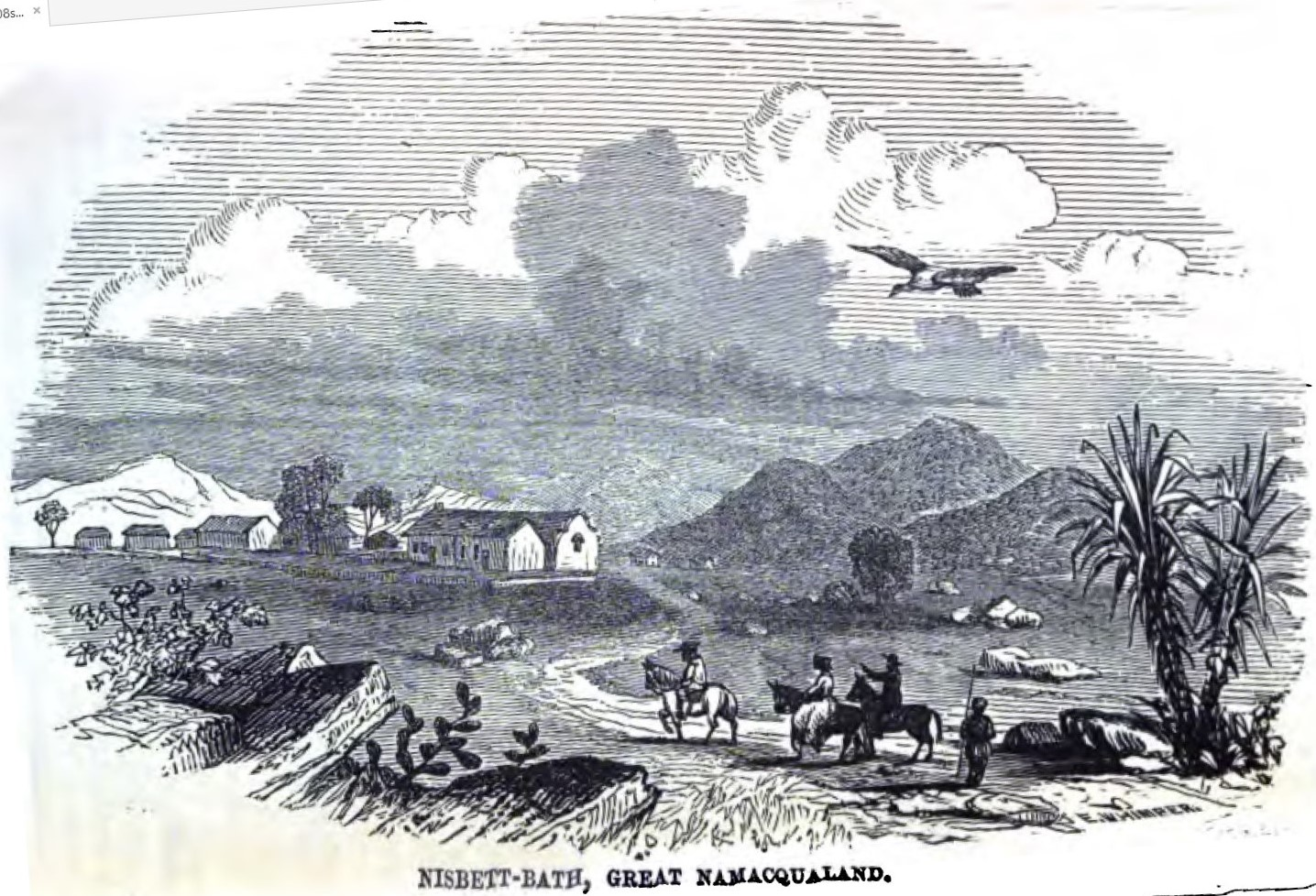
Nisbett-Bath, Great Namacqualand (1852)

Warmbad (Afrikaans and German for Warm Bath, Nama: |Aixa-aibes) is a settlement located in the ǁKaras Region of southern Namibia. It is situated south of Karasburg at the Homs River, close to the border with South Africa, and belongs to the Karasburg electoral constituency.

First occupied by traders, hunters, and missionaries of different congregations, the hot springs from which the settlement's name is derived were first exploited at the beginning of the 20th century and are now being developed into a tourist attraction. Recently, uranium was discovered in the area.

Climatically, Warmbad lies between the coastal desert and the Karoo. Winter frost occurs and very little rainfall (annual average: 96 millimetres (3.8 in)). The mean medial temperature lies between 12 and 15 degrees.

== History ==
=== Pre-colonial period ===
Warmbad was first named in 1760 by scout Jacobus Coetzee, the first documented European to cross the Oranje River into the South West African territory that today forms the state of Namibia. At the time it served as stop-over for traders, adventurers and large game hunters from the South African Cape Colony. In 1805 two missionaries from the London Missionary Society, Abraham and Christian Albrecht, initiated the erection of a church and a pastor's house, thereby establishing the first mission station in South West Africa in 1806. This year is assumed to be the foundation year of the settlement.

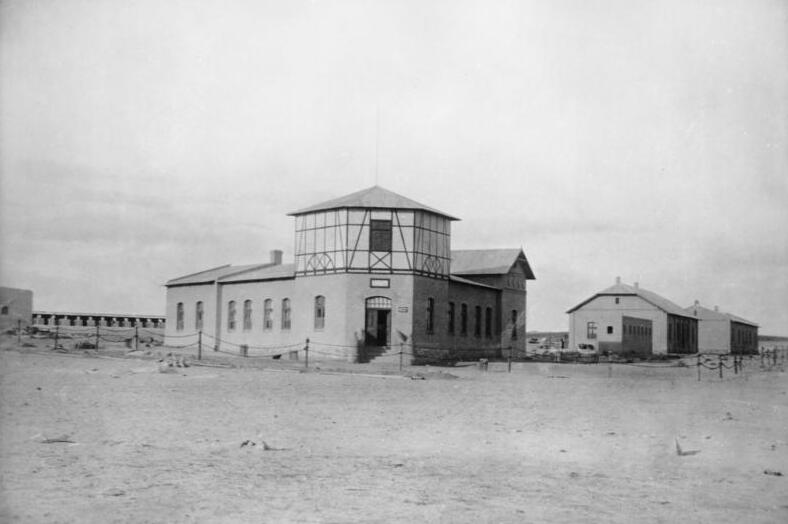
Warmbad barracks, early 20th century

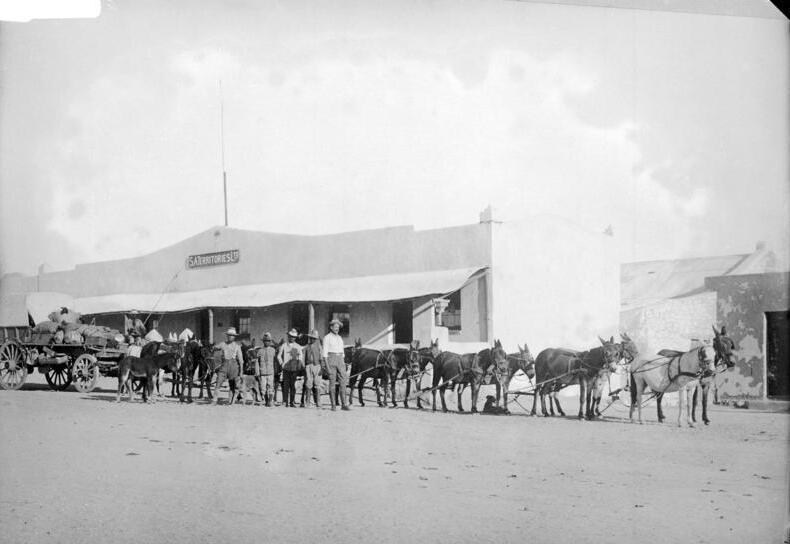
Donkey cart in front of the Warmbad S.A. Territories Ltd building, early 20th century

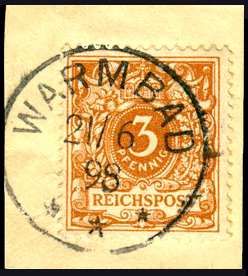
Stamps for German South West Africa postmarked Warmbad 1898

These two buildings were the first European-style buildings on South West African soil. The local Orlam community under the leadership of Jager Afrikaner soon became angry about the European influence and destroyed both buildings in 1811. Until the rediscovery of ǁKhauxaǃnas which was built before the advent of the 19th century the oldest structure in Namibia was assumed to be the Schmelenhaus in Bethanie, erected in 1814.

In 1834, Wesleyan missionary Edward Cook entered the area and erected a new missionary building on the foundations of the destroyed buildings. Scientist Sir James Edward Alexander lived in one of its rooms during his stay in 1836. In the 1840s Benjamin Ridsdale was stationed here and embarked on several journeys to nearby Orlam communities. He referred to Warmbad as Nisbett Bath. In 1867 the Rhenish Missionary Society took over operations in Warmbad. A school was built in 1868, and a new church in 1877.

=== German colonial period ===
After Imperial Germany had declared its territorial rights over South West Africa, a fort was built in Warmbad in 1905, and Schutztruppe soldiers were stationed at the settlement to counter the Herero and Nama uprising. Jacob Morenga, one of the leading figures of resistance against the Germans, attacked the Germans stationed in Namibia's South from his hidden fortress ǁKhauxaǃnas. Warmbad cemetery features a statue of him in remembrance of these events.

In 1908 the first swimming pool was built at the |Aixa-aibes hot springs, and in 1910 the settlement gained District status. Still, Warmbad lost its original importance as a stop-over during this time, becoming bypassed by railway connections and new road construction. Many of the buildings began to decay.

=== After Namibian independence ===
Upon Independence of Namibia Warmbad was a village, governed by a seven-seat village council. In the 1992 Namibian local elections only 31 people cast their votes. It was narrowly won by the opposition Democratic Turnhalle Alliance (DTA) which gained 19 votes and four seats, followed by SWAPO which gained 13 votes and three seats. The village status of Warmbad was revoked before the 1998 local authority elections, so that it came under the governance of the ǁKaras Regional Council.

== Economy and Infrastructure ==
The majority of Warmbad's approximately 1,200 inhabitants live in abject poverty, 90% are unemployed. There is no industry in the area, residents survive from old-age pensions and subsistence goat farming.

The settlement features a school for 160 learners, a museum situated in the former police station and a church.

Between 2004 and 2006 Warmbad was developed for tourism purposes, with the |Aixa-aibes healing hot spa as the main attraction. The project was supported by the Namibian and the German governments and included the renovation of the public bath as well as the reconstruction of some of the historic buildings. While under South African mandate, the hot springs were sold to a private investor for 12,000 Rand. After Namibian independence, the government bought the site back for five times that amount. The springs are now community property again.

In 2009, Canadian mining company Xemplar Energy announced the discovery of significant Uranium deposits in the area. Xemplar has since been listed at the Namibian Stock Exchange.

== Dutch Reformed Church ==
After the Second Boer War, some Afrikaners preferred emigration to German South West Africa over remaining in South Africa under British rule. As more Afrikaans-speakers came to the area, the need for an Afrikaans church grew. Dutch Reformed Church in South Africa (NGK) pioneer, Rev. Leonard, who then had all South West Africa in his purview, ministered to settlers largely by ox and donkey cart.

At the time, the Southwest was governed by the Upington synod and was known as the Dutch Reformed Church Gibeon, the mother church of all present Namibian NGK denominations. On June 23, 1928, the Warmbad congregation was split from the Dutch Reformed Church Keetmanshoop, itself an offshoot of Gibeon founded in 1924. On October 12, 1929, Dr. A.J. Stals was confirmed as the congregation's first pastor. He served during drought and the Great Depression until April 1935. On June 22, 1935, J.H. Steenkamp was invested as the church's next pastor. During his tenure, on May 14, 1939, near the railway station in Kalkfontein (now Karasburg), the cornerstone was laid for the main hall of the building that would house the Dutch Reformed Church Karasburg upon its founding in 1952.

== Sources ==
- Olivier, Dr. P.L. (compiler). 1952. Ons gemeentelike feesalbum ("Our congregational festival album"). Cape Town and Pretoria: Dutch Reformed Church Press.
