= Komaggas =

- Location within Northern Cape Location within South Africa
- Coordinates: 29.8°S 17.5°E
- Country: South Africa
- Province: Northern Cape
- District: Namakwa
- Municipality: Nama Khoi
- Established: 1828

Government
  - Councillor: Jacobus Goedeman (Democratic Alliance)

Area
  - Total: 2.59 km^{2} (1.00 sq mi)

Population (2011)
  - Total: 3,116
  - Density: 1,200/km^{2} (3,120/sq mi)

Racial makeup (2011)
  - Black African: 2.4%
  - Coloured: 95.6%
  - Indian/Asian: 0.8%
  - White: 0.4%
  - Other: 0.7%

First languages (2011)
  - Afrikaans: 96.7%
  - Sign language: 1.0%
  - Other: 2.2%
- Time zone: UTC+2 (SAST)
- Postal code (street): 8242
- PO box: 8242
- Area code: 027

Komaggas is a town in Namakwa District Municipality in the Northern Cape province of South Africa.

Settlement 40 km southwest of Springbok and 45 km north of Soebatsfontein, on the Komaggas River, a tributary of the Buffels River. Founded as a station of the London Missionary Society in 1829, it was taken over by the Rhenish Missionary Society in 1843 and by the Dutch Reformed Church in 1936. The name is variously explained as ‘abundance of maws of animals’ and ‘place of many wild olive trees’; the latter explanation is probably correct.
