= Tses =

- Village
- Location in Namibia
- Coordinates: 25°53′S 18°0′E
- Country: Namibia
- Region: ǁKaras Region

Population (2023)
  - Total: 2,053
- Time zone: UTC+2 (South African Standard Time)
- Climate: BWh

Tses (Khoekhoe: place of daylight) is a village in the ǁKaras Region of southern Namibia. It had 2,053 inhabitants in 2023.

== Geography ==
Tses is situated one kilometre off the main B1 highway from Windhoek to Noordoewer, opposite the turning to Berseba and the Brukkaros Mountain.

Historical population
Year	Pop.	±% p.a.
2011	1,365	—
2023	2,053	+3.46%

== History ==
From 1980 until independence in 1990, Tses was part of Namaland, a bantustan for the Nama people.

== Economy and Infrastructure ==
The main economic activity in this area is subsistence livestock farming. Tses houses a general dealer and a petrol station. The passenger trains from Windhoek to Keetmanshoop stop at Tses.

One of the largest employers at Tses shall be Groot Glass, formerly known as Tses Glass, one of the most modern glass plants in the southern part of Africa. Due to unclear financing, the realization of the project is uncertain. Except by a symbolic act of groundbreaking, the erection has not been started up to now.

== Politics ==
Tses is governed by a village council that has five seats.

In the 2010 local authority election, a total of 984 votes were cast in the village. SWAPO won with approximately 55% of the vote. Of the four other parties seeking seats, Democratic Turnhalle Alliance (DTA) received approximately 21% of the vote, followed by Rally for Democracy and Progress (RDP, 19%), South West Africa National Union (SWANU, 2%) and Congress of Democrats (COD, 2%). The 2015 local authority election was likewise won by SWAPO party which gained three seats (260 votes). The remaining two seats went to the DTA which obtained 156 votes.

The 2020 local authority election was won by the Landless People's Movement (LPM, a new party registered in 2018) with 267 votes and two seats. SWAPO was the runner-up, obtaining 193 and also two seats. The remaining seat went to the Popular Democratic Movement (PDM, the new name of the DTA since 2017) with 89 votes.
