= Bethanie, Namibia =

Bethanie ǀUiǂgandes Klipfontein
- Village
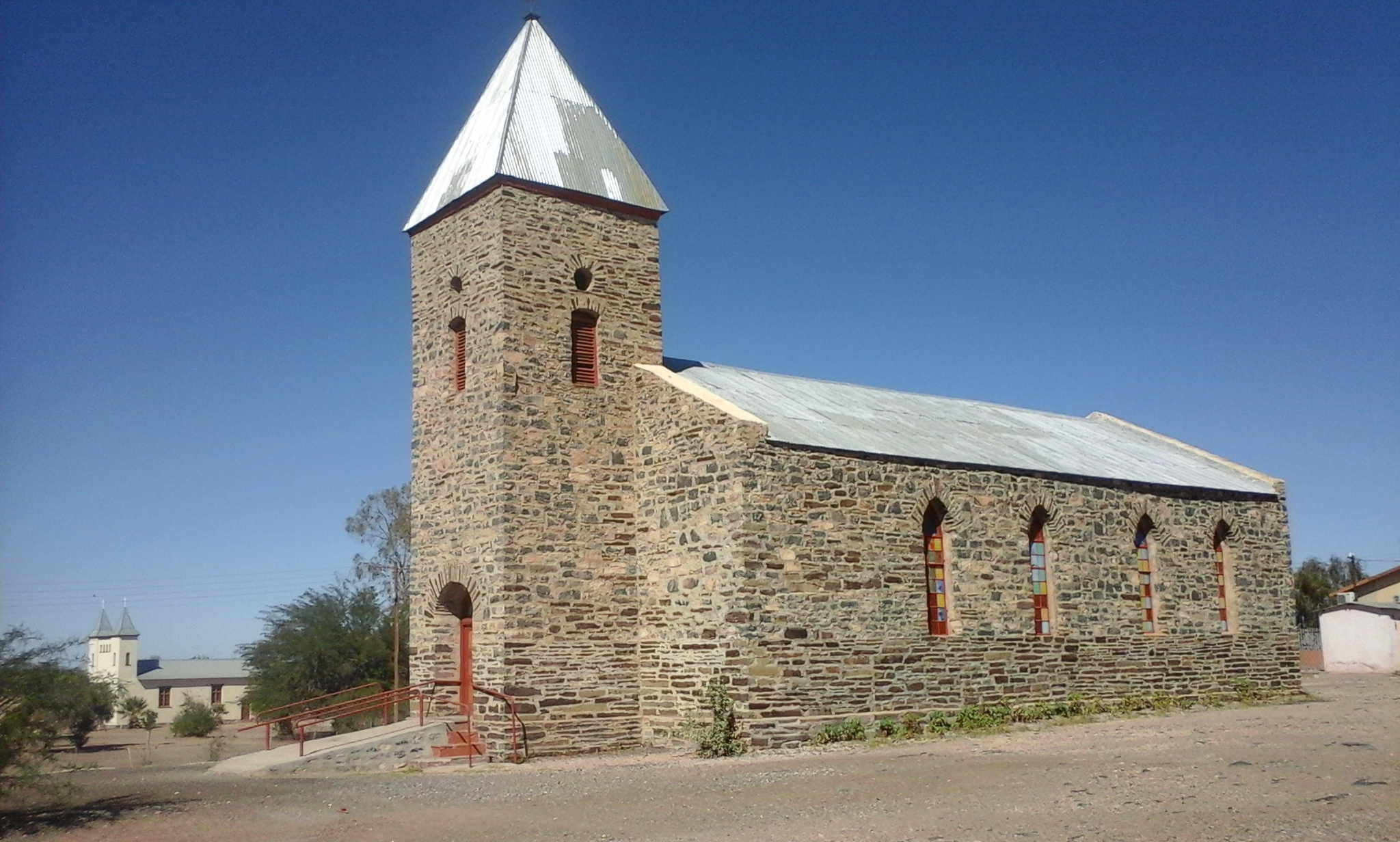
- The Lentia Lutheran Church, built 1899. The village's mission church is in the background on the left.

- Location in Namibia
- Coordinates: 26°30′00″S 17°09′30″E
- Country: Namibia
- Region: ǁKaras Region
- Constituency: Berseba Constituency

Population (2023)
  - Total: 2,372
- Time zone: UTC+2 (SAST)
- Climate: BWh

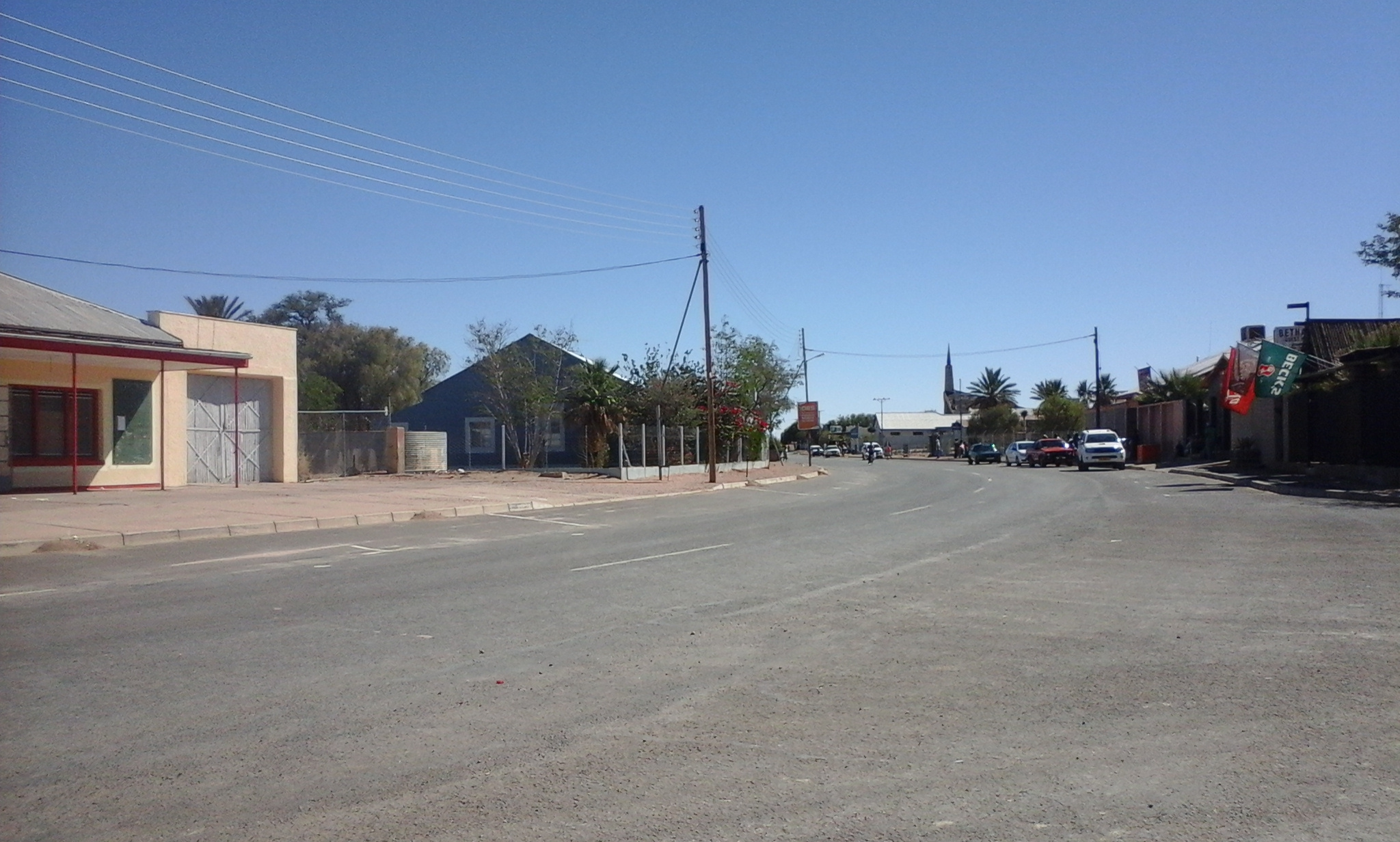
Main road of the village in 2016

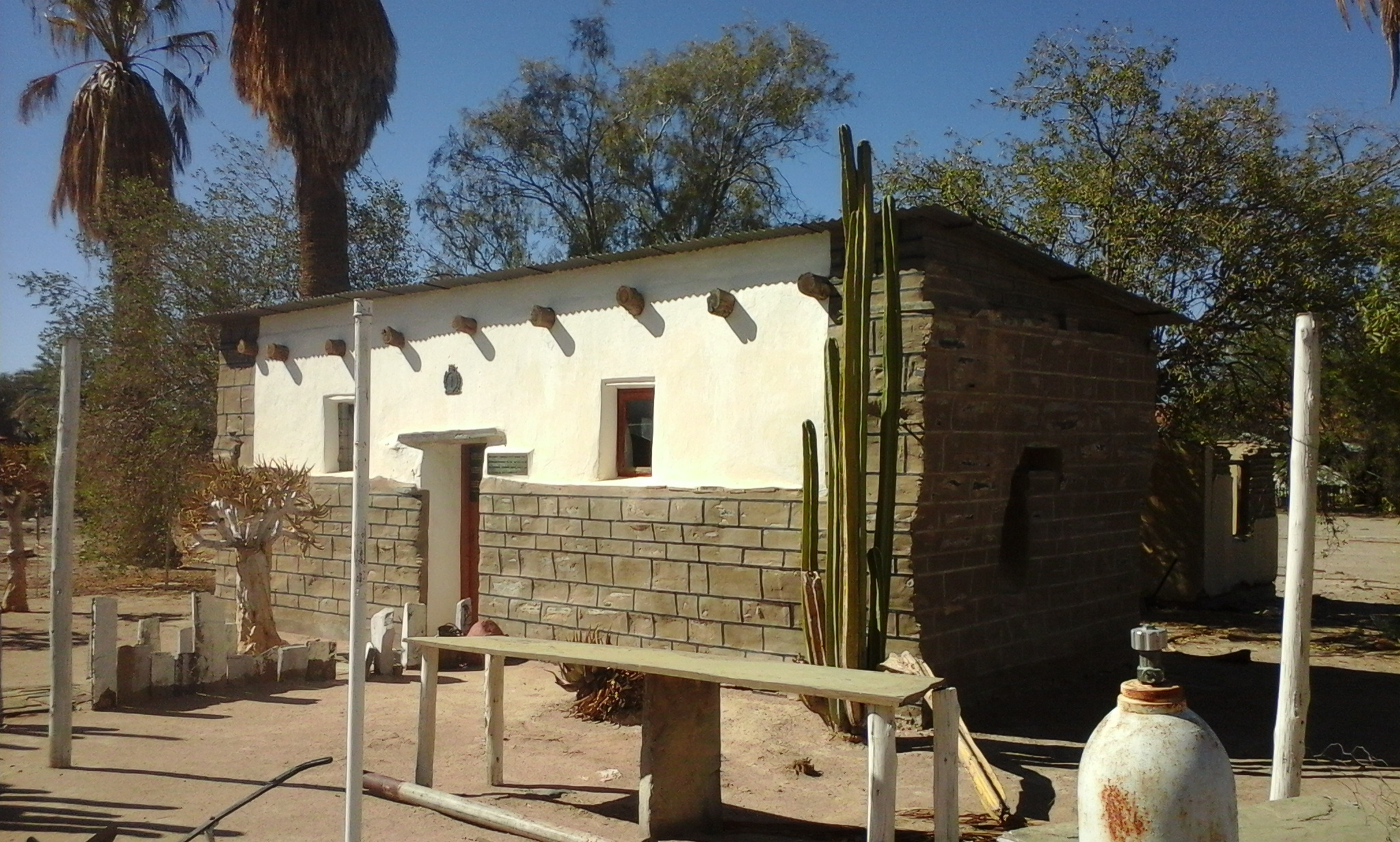
The Schmelenhaus

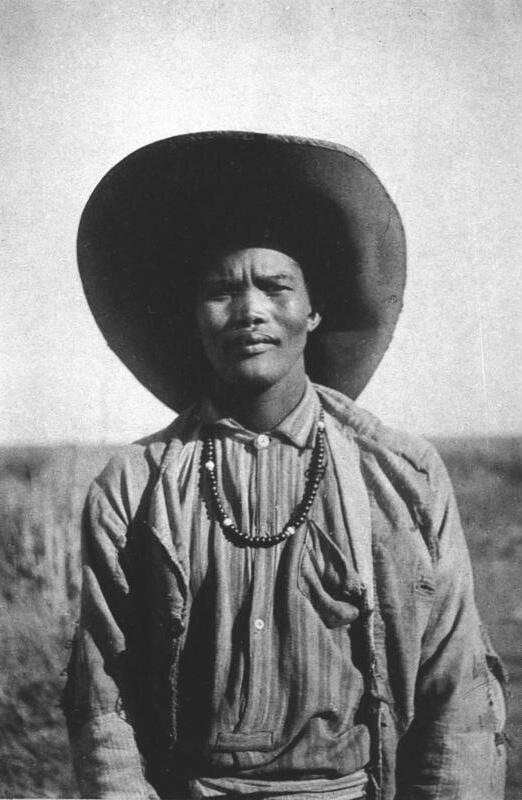
Young man from Bethanie (1897)

Bethanie (often in German: Bethanien, and in English: Bethany, previously Klipfontein, Khoekhoegowab: ǀUiǂgandes) is a village in the ǁKaras Region of southern Namibia. It is one of the oldest settlements in the country. Bethanie had 2,372 inhabitants in 2023.

== Geography ==
Bethanie is situated on the C14 road between Goageb and Walvis Bay, 100 km (62 mi) west of Keetmanshoop.

Historical population
Year	Pop.	±% p.a.
2011	1,748	—
2023	2,372	+2.58%

== History ==
The area around Bethanie originally belonged to the Red Nation, the main subtribe of the Nama people. At the beginning of the 18th century, the ǃAman (Bethanie Orlam), a subtribe of the Orlam people, obtained settlement rights and settled here. As missionaries started travelling north from the Cape Colony in the early 19th century, they established mission stations on their way. The London Missionary Society founded the town, but, because of a shortage of missionaries and presumably because of the cooperation between the London and Rhenish Missionary Society at the time, they instead sent a German missionary.

Reverend Heinrich Schmelen arrived in 1814 as missionary of the Kaiǀkhauan (Khauas Nama) and their leader Amraal Lambert. The Schmelenhaus was built the same year, long considered the oldest structure in Namibia. It has been a National Monument since 1952 and currently serves as a small museum. It was later discovered that the church and the pastor's house in Warmbad, both destroyed in 1811, were older than the Schmelenhaus, and that the fortification of ǁKhauxaǃnas predates all other European constructions. Schmelen also initiated the building of a chapel which was in ruins when James Edward Alexander visited the village in 1837.

In 1822, Schmelen left Bethanie after becoming frustrated with his missionary work among the local tribes, who refused his repeated and impassioned pleas to attend church and because of an ongoing conflict between Amraal Lambert's Orlam and another Nama tribe living at the station. Livestock and men were killed, and buildings burned. According to James Edward Alexander, Schmelen had "tried in vain to prevent the people of the station exchanging their cattle at [Lüderitz] ... for fire-arms and ammunition" and saw no end to the local conflicts.

The original church was built in 1859, and also still stands today.

In 1883, Bethanie was the scene of the historical land sale at the house of Nama chief Josef Frederiks II that would eventually establish Imperial Germany's colony of German South West Africa. Adolf Lüderitz in May 1883 obtained the area of Angra Pequena (today the town of Lüderitz) from Frederiks for 100£ in gold and 200 rifles. Three months later on 21 August, Frederiks sold Lüderitz with a stretch of land 140 kilometres (87 mi) wide, between the Orange River and Angra Pequena, for 500£ and 60 rifles. This area was far bigger than Frederiks had thought, as the contract specified its width as "20 geographical miles", a term that the tribal chief was not familiar with: 1 German geographical mile was approximately 7.4 kilometres (4 5/8 mi), whereas the common mile in the territory was the English mile, 1.6 kilometres.

== Politics ==
Upon Namibian independence Bethanie was governed by a seven-seat village council. The first local elections run in Namibia, the 1992 local elections, was won by SWAPO which obtained 427 votes and gained four seats. The Democratic Turnhalle Alliance (DTA) came second with 327 votes and three seats. The 1998 local authority elections saw a similar result. SWAPO again obtained four seats with 187 votes, DTA got the remaining thee seats with 111 votes.

In the 2004 local authority elections, DTA won for the first time, competing for only five seats in a downsized village council. It gained three council seats and obtained 307 votes, narrowly beating SWAPO which gained to 299 votes and two seats. In the 2010 local authority election Bethanie again was one of only a few local councils in Namibia that SWAPO did not win. This time the Rally for Democracy and Progress (RDP, an opposition party founded in 2007) narrowly beat SWAPO with 253 to 245 votes. The DTA finished in 3rd with 52 votes. The 2015 local authority election was won by SWAPO which gained three seats (278 votes) while the DTA gained the remaining two seats (188 votes).

In the 2020 local authority election the Landless People's Movement (LPM, a new party registered in 2018) won with 378 votes and gained three seats. One seat each went to the Popular Democratic Movement (PDM, the new name of the DTA since 2017) with 179 votes, and to SWAPO with 166 votes.

Bethanie is the seat of the !Aman Traditional Authority, and its current chief (Kaptein) is Johannes Frederick. His predecessor David Frederick (Chief 1977-2018), alongside Herero Paramount Chief Advocate Vekuii Rukoro in January 2017 filed a class-action lawsuit against Germany on behalf of the Herero and Nama peoples in the U.S. District Court for the Southern District of New York. David Frederick was the grandson of Cornelius Fredericks, a leading resistance fighter against German colonial invasion.

== Media and popular culture ==
A fictionalized version of Bethanie – named "Bethany" in English and depicted as a drought-plagued former mining town – is the primary setting for Richard Stanley's 1993 feature horror film, Dust Devil.
