= ǁKhauxaǃnas =

Archaeological site in Namibia

Coordinates: 27°14′2.41″S 19°19′51.08″E

- Schans Vlakte
- near Warmfontein, Namibia
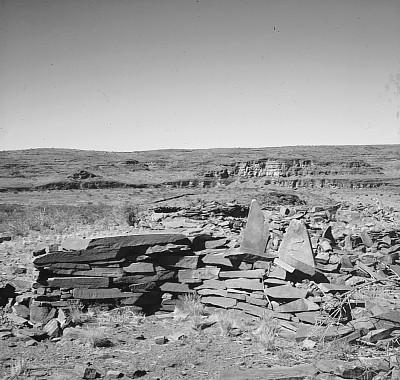
- View to the South-East, the protection wall is in the background

Site information
- Type: Fortress
- Owner: Private
- Condition: Ruin

Site history
- Built: before 1800
- Built by: Klaas Afrikaner and his two sons Jager and Titus
- In use: part of farms Gugunas and Schanzen; until about 1820, and again 1904/05
- Materials: red sandstone rock slabs

Garrison information
- Occupants: Orlam Afrikaners

ǁKhauxaǃnas (Khoekhoegowab: passively defend people from an enemy, Afrikaans / Dutch name Schans Vlakte: fortified valley) is an uninhabited village with a ruined fortress in south-eastern Namibia, east of the Great Karas Mountains. It is the oldest systematically designed and built structure in Namibia, pre-dating all buildings erected by Europeans. Built at the end of the 18th century, most likely between 1796 and 1798 by Klaas Afrikaner and his two sons Jager and Titus, ǁKhauxaǃnas served as a hidden retreat and a fortress to fend off possible pursuits by Cape authorities. The Orlam Afrikaner tribe left the place in the 1820s but it continued to be inhabited by the Veldschoendragers (ǁHawoben) tribe until the mid-19th century.

== Location and site description ==
ǁKhauxaǃnas is situated in the eastern part of the ǁKaras Region in southern Namibia, 173 km (107 mi) south-east of Keetmanshoop. It lies on the banks of Bak River, 6 km (3.7 mi) off the district road D612. The nearest inhabited settlement is Warmfontein, 24 km (15 mi) to the north-west. The site can only be reached by four-wheel drive vehicles, and the last kilometer has to be reached on foot.

The site named ǁKhauxaǃnas refers to the fortified settlement atop the hill overlooking the Bak River. It consists of a trapezium-shaped walled-in enclosure of approximately 150 by 350 meters, and contains several ruins of buildings and kraals. Most of the dwellings are situated near the perimeter wall, which contains 23 doorways. The settlement directly adjacent to the west is the Veldschoendragers Schans Vlakte village that was described by 19th century missionaries. It is equally uninhabited today and contains the ruins of a church that was designed to accommodate 300 people. While the fortification was built by piling sandstone slabs and fitting them together, mortar was used for the church walls.

The military use and value of the fortress can be disputed. The length of the perimeter wall and the number of doorways in it would have made the site difficult to defend against a sizable number of attackers. The dwellings would have been particularly at risk as they were placed very close to the surrounding wall. However, ǁKhauxaǃnas might never have had to prove its defensive properties. Ridsdale reports that

"[t]he opportunity of defending themselves in their impregnable fortification[...] never occurred, as the commandoes of Boers from the Colony pursued them no farther than Nisbett Bath",

where "Nisbett Bath" is a reference to Warmbad, and Boers are the white South African descendants of largely Dutch, French, German and Prussian immigrants whose transit was via the Dutch ports to the Cape.

== History ==
=== Foundation as Afrikaner hideout ===
In the 1770s the Orlam Afrikaner clan under the leadership of Klaas Afrikaner left the Cape Colony, first with the consent, possibly even under the order, of the Dutch East India Company. The clan subsequently got into conflict with the authorities which openly broke out in March 1796 when the Afrikaners shot a farmer, Pieter Pienaar. It was in this year or soon thereafter that ǁKhauxaǃnas was built by Klaas Afrikaner and his two sons Jager and Titus. ǁKhauxaǃnas served as a hidden retreat and a fortress to fend off possible pursuits by the Cape authorities. The Orlam Afrikaners inhabited it until the 1820s when they moved further northwards to Blydeverwacht and eventually to Windhoek.

=== Veldschoendragers village and missionary outpost ===
After the departure of the Afrikaner clan the Veldschoendragers (ǁHawoben) moved from Klipfontein to ǁKhauxaǃnas, which they called Schans Vlakte. It became the capital village of their tribe and was the place of their chief's residence. Several Wesleyan missionaries stationed in Warmbad visited the village that by then had lost its military importance.

Due to a severe draught at the end of the 1840s, the ǁHawoben were forced to move further northwards. When the Rhenish Missionary Society took over operations in Warmbad in 1867 they did not make any reference to ǁKhauxaǃnas and its population.

=== During the Herero and Nama War ===
Jacob Morenga and his men used ǁKhauxaǃnas as a refuge during the Herero and Nama uprising 1904–07. From there they launched a series of attacks against German Schutztruppe which culminated in the killing of Lieutenant Baron Nikolai von Stempel on 30 August 1904.

== Discovery ==
The only historical written description of ǁKhauxaǃnas is found in the diaries of Benjamin Ridsdale and John A. Bailie from the Wesleyan Missionary Society who were missionaries in Warmbad in the 1840s. Ridsdale writes:

In front of the village is a low mountain, which is surrounded at the top by a wall, the entire length of which must be eight or ten hundred yards, low in places difficult to access, and five or six feet high in those parts that are most easily available. This wall, which consists of a double row of loose flat stones piled one above another, was thrown round the mountain by the Afrikaners (Orlam Afrikaners from Nama descent) at the beginning of the century.

After their visit the place was only rediscovered in 1986 by Klaus Dierks, hobby historian and later deputy minister in the Namibian Government. None of the written historical records of the Orlam Afrikaners mention the place.

== Importance and recognition ==
The ruins of ǁKhauxaǃnas are the earliest engineered settlement in Namibia known by now. All its buildings are older than any of the structures erected by Europeans, including the Schmelenhaus in Bethanie (built 1814) and the mission station in Warmbad (built between 1805 and 1810). Both were at some time considered to be the oldest buildings in Namibia—it now turns out that this recognition ignored the history of the indigenous population. Existence of this settlement provides strong evidence that a developed society existed prior to German colonisation. The discoverer Dr. Dierks compared its possible impact on nation building and national pride to that of the Great Zimbabwe ruins. He points out that

[m]ost of the written records [on the history of Namibia] were compiled by European adventurers, travellers, missionaries and colonial administrators; inevitably the Namibian people are described primarily from an alien perspective [...].

It was for many years assumed that cultural and social development in the area began only with the intrusion of European influences. Structures of unknown origin had previously been attributed to European builders in the pre-colonial and colonial era; ǁKhauxaǃnas itself was entered on maps as "Old German Fortifications 1904–1906", which was later proven false, given that it was used as shelter and hideout against the Schutztruppe (Protection Force) of the German Empire.

The ruins of ǁKhauxaǃnas were proclaimed a National Monument in 1992. This proclamation has still (2006) not been effected. In 1997 the Government of Namibia issued a series of stamps featuring the ruins.
