= Oorlam people =

Ethnic group from southern Africa

Oorlam Orlaam, Oorlammers, Oerlams, Orlamse Hottentots
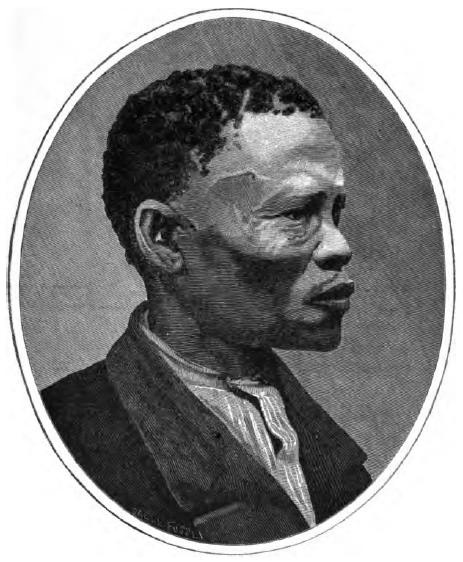
- Jan Jonker Afrikaner (1820–1889), an early Orlam

Regions with significant populations
- Namibia, South Africa

Languages
- Afrikaans, Oorlams Creole, English, Khoekhoe

Religion
- Predominantly Christianity with Animist and African Traditional Religion minorities

Related ethnic groups
- Afrikaners, Nama, Coloureds, Griqua

The Oorlam or Orlam people (also known as Orlaam, Oorlammers, Oerlams, or Orlamse Hottentots) are a subtribe of the Nama people, largely assimilated after their migration from the Cape Colony (today, part of South Africa) to Namaqualand and Damaraland (now in Namibia).

Oorlam clans were originally formed from mixed-race descendants of indigenous Khoikhoi, Europeans and slaves from Mozambique, Madagascar, India and Indonesia. Similar to the other Afrikaans-speaking group at the time, the Trekboers, Oorlam originally populated the frontiers of the infant Cape Colony, later living as semi-nomadic commandos of mounted gunmen. Also, like the Boers, they migrated inland from the Cape, and established several states in what are now South Africa and Namibia. The Oorlam migration in South Africa also produced the related Griqua people.

== History ==
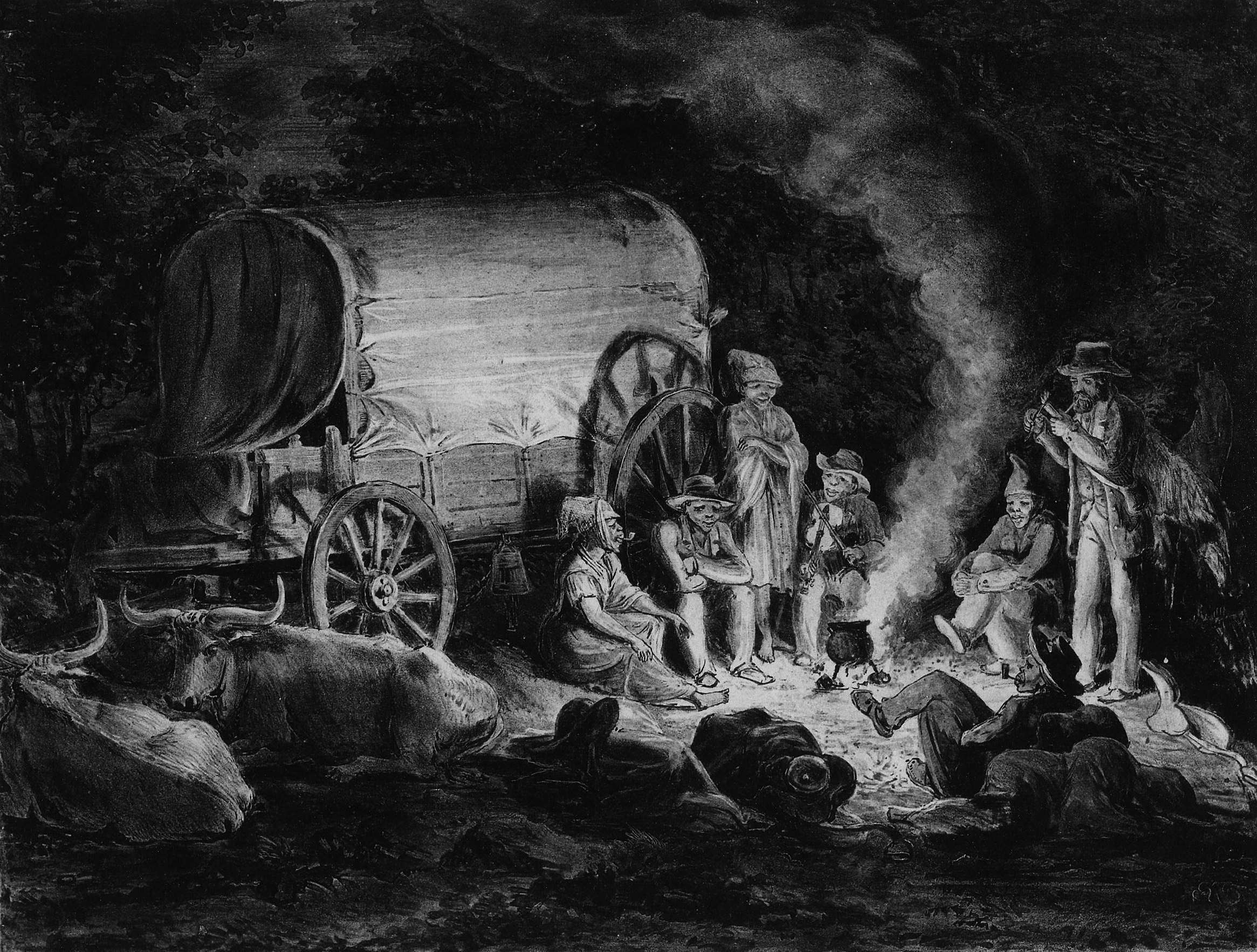
Mixed-race "Afrikander" Trekboer nomads in the Cape Colony, ancestral people to the Oorlam and Griqua migrations.

Beginning in the late 18th century, Oorlam communities migrated from the Cape Colony north to Namaqualand. They settled places earlier occupied by the Nama. They came partly to escape the colonial Dutch East India Company conscription, partly to raid and trade, and partly to obtain herding lands. Some of these emigrant Oorlams (including the band led by the outlaw Jager Afrikaner and his son Jonker Afrikaner in the Transgariep) retained links to Oorlam communities in or close to the borders of the Cape Colony. In the face of gradual Boer expansion and then large-scale Boer migrations, such as the Dorsland Trek, away from British rule in the Cape, Jonker Afrikaner brought his people into Namaqualand by the mid-19th century, becoming a formidable force for Oorlam domination over the Nama and against the Bantu-speaking Hereros for a period.

Emerging from populations of Khoikhoi servants raised on Boer farms, many of them having been orphaned and captured in Dutch commando raids, Oorlams primarily spoke a version of Dutch or proto-Afrikaans and were much influenced by Cape Dutch colonial ways of life, including adoption of horses and guns, European clothing, and Christianity.

However, after two centuries of assimilation into the Nama culture, many Oorlams today regard Khoekhoe (Damara/Nama) as their mother tongue. The distinction between Namas and Oorlams has gradually disappeared, such that they are regarded as a single ethnic group, despite their differing origins.

== Clans ==
The Orlam people comprise various subtribes, clans and families. In South Africa, the Griqua are an influential Oorlam group.

The clans that migrated across the Oranje into South West Africa are, in order of their time of arrival:

- The ǀAixaǀaen (Orlam Afrikaners), the first group to enter and permanently settle in Namibia. Their leader Klaas Afrikaner left the Cape Colony around 1770. The clan first built the fortress of ǁKhauxaǃnas, then moved to Blydeverwacht, and finally settled at Windhoek.
- The ǃAman (Bethanie Orlam) subtribe settled at Bethanie at the turn of the eighteenth century.
- The Kaiǀkhauan (Khauas Nama) subtribe formed in the 1830s, when the Vlermuis clan merged with the Amraal family. Their home settlement became Naosanabis (now Leonardville), which they occupied from 1840 onward. This clan ceased to exist after military defeat by Imperial German Schutztruppe in 1894 and 1896.
- The ǀHaiǀkhauan (Berseba Orlam) subtribe formed in 1850, when the Tibot and Goliath families split from the ǃAman to found Berseba.
- The ǀKhowesin (Witbooi Orlam) subtribe was the last to take up settlement in Namibia. They originated at Pella, south of the Orange River. Their home town became Gibeon.

== Notable Oorlam people ==
- Oude Ram Afrikaner
- Klaas Afrikaner
- Jager Afrikaner
- Jonker Afrikaner
- Christian Afrikaner
- Jan Jonker Afrikaner
- Hendrina Afrikaner
- Amraal Lambert
- Kido Witbooi

== See also ==
- Oorlams creole
- Coloured
- Griqua people
- Basters
- Nama people
- Khoikhoi
- Goffal
