= Maharero =

Herero chief (c. 1820–1890)

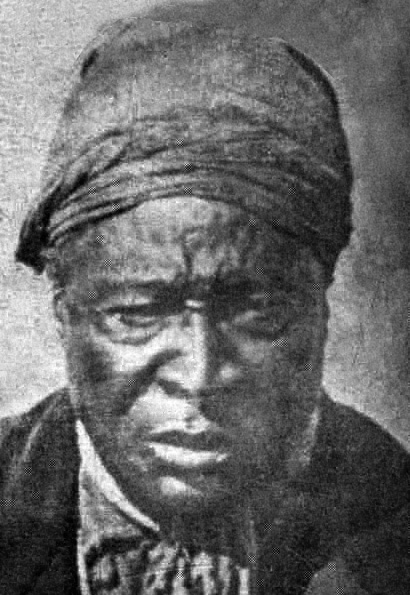

Paramount chief of the Herero
- Reign: 1863 – 7 October 1890
- Predecessor: Position established
- Successor: Samuel Maharero
- Born: Maharero waTjamuaha c. 1820; Okahandja
- Died: 7 October 1890 (aged 69–70); Okahandja, German South West Africa

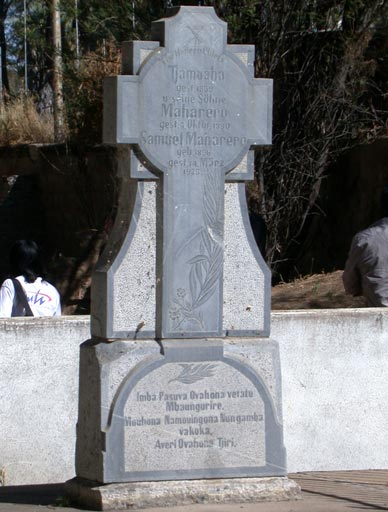
Tombstone for Tjamuaha, Maharero, and Samuel Maharero in Okahandja

Maharero kaTjamuaha (c. 1820 – 7 October 1890) was the first paramount chief of the Herero people, reigning from around 1863 until his death in 1890. He oversaw the Hereros' split from the Oorlam Afrikaners and subsequent conflicts between the two ethnic groups, as well as the colonisation of modern Namibia by the German Empire.

== Early life ==
Maharero kaTjamuaha was born about 1820 at Okahandja. In 1843 he went with his father Tjamuaha to Windhoek to stay with Jonker Afrikaner, Captain of the Oorlam Afrikaners. Tjamuaha was an ally of Jonker Afrikaner until his death in 1861, albeit in a subordinate position.

== Herero-Orlam hostilities ==
When Jonker Afrikaner died, he was succeeded by Christian Afrikaner. Due to this, Maharero rebelled against the Afrikaners. They subsequently attacked Maharero's men at Otjimbingwe on 15 June 1863, a battle in which Christian Afrikaner was killed.

Christian's successor, Jan Jonker Afrikaner did not want to allow the Hereros to escape from his overlordship, and so hostilities continued for several years.

Some traders at Otjimbingwe, notably Charles John Andersson and Frederick Thomas Green, considered that the war was bad for trade, and took a hand in organising and leading the Herero army. Green led a force that captured most of the Oorlam cattle, and on 22 June 1864 there was a decisive battle in which Jan Jonker Afrikaner's forces were defeated.

Dispensing with the services of the traders, Maharero won more battles, and took control of Damaraland, and even sent his forces into Namaqualand. Eventually in 1870 a peace was brokered by missionary Carl Hugo Hahn of the Rhenish Missionary Society.

In the decade that followed, many more white traders entered Damaraland, mostly from the Cape Colony. More serious still were the Boer incursions into the Herero lands from the Boer republics to the east. Maharero complained to the governor of the Cape Colony about Boers entering the eastern part of the territory. The Cape government sent the Palgrave Commission, and later annexed Walvis Bay in 1878, though this was not actually part of Maharero's territory.

In 1880, there were renewed hostilities between Maharero and Jan Jonker Afrikaner. What was originally a dispute over grazing escalated into a pogrom against all Nama living in Maharero's territory, and over 200 were killed. One who escaped with his life was Hendrik Witbooi, who thereafter led the opposition to Maharero.

Also faced with repeated attacks by the ǀKhowesin, a subtribe of the Khoekhoe under Hendrik Witbooi, Maharero signed a protection treaty with German colonial governor Heinrich Ernst Göring on 21 October 1885 but did not cede the land of the Herero. Due to lack of German support against Witbooi, Maharero renounced this treaty in 1888 and reopened negotiations with the government of the Cape Colony. But by that time the Scramble for Africa was under way, and the Cape Colony's government was powerless to intervene, even if it had wanted to, as the European powers had by then recognised South West Africa as a German sphere of influence. Maharero reaffirmed the treaty with the Germans in May 1890.

Maharero died on 7 October 1890 in Okahandja. Historian Heinrich Vedder claims that his main wife Kataree poisoned him in order to prevent him from changing his mind on who his successor should be. His eldest son Samuel Maharero succeeded him as chief of the Herero.

== Bibliography ==
- Vedder, Heinrich (1997). Das alte Südwestafrika. Südwestafrikas Geschichte bis zum Tode Mahareros 1890 [The old South-West Africa. South-West Africa's history until Maharero's death 1890] (in German) (7th ed.). Windhoek: Namibia Scientific Society. ISBN 0-949995-33-9.
- Dictionary of South African Biography, Vol II. Pretoria: Human Sciences Research Council. 1972. ISBN 0-624-00369-8.
- Gewald, Jan-Bart (1999). Herero heroes: a socio-political history of the Herero of Namibia 1890-1923. Oxford: James Currey. ISBN 0-85255-749-3.

| Preceded by Tjamuaha | Paramount Chief of the Herero people 1861–1890 | Succeeded by Samuel Maharero |
