= Namibian nationality law =

Namibian Citizenship Act 14 of 1990

Parliament of Namibia
- Long title: Act to further regulate the acquisition or loss of Namibian citizenship in pursuance of the provisions of Article 4 of the Namibian Constitution; and to provide for matters incidental thereto
- Enacted by: Government of Namibia
- Status: Current legislation

Namibian nationality law is regulated by the Constitution of Namibia, as amended; the Namibian Citizenship Act, and its revisions; and various international agreements to which the country is a signatory. These laws determine who is, or is eligible to be, a national of Namibia. The legal means to acquire nationality, formal legal membership in a nation, differ from the domestic relationship of rights and obligations between a national and the nation, known as citizenship. Nationality describes the relationship of an individual to the state under international law, whereas citizenship is the domestic relationship of an individual within the nation.

Commonwealth countries often use the terms nationality and citizenship as synonyms, despite their legal distinction and the fact that they are regulated by different governmental administrative bodies. Namibian nationality is typically obtained under the principle of jus soli, i.e. by birth in the territory, or jus sanguinis, i.e. by birth in Namibia or abroad to parents with Namibian nationality. It can be granted to persons with an affiliation to the country, or to a permanent resident who has lived in the country for a given period of time through naturalisation.

== Acquiring Namibian nationality ==
Nationality can be obtained in Namibia at birth or later in life through naturalisation.

=== By birth ===
Typically, in Namibia, a combination of jus sanguinis and jus soli are used to determine nationality at birth. Those who are eligible include:

- Persons born in Namibia whose parents are legal ordinary residents in the country and do not have diplomatic immunity and are not employed in the service of another government;
- Persons born in the country who would otherwise be stateless; or
- Persons born anywhere who have at least one parent who is Namibian, as long as the parents do not have diplomatic immunity. (Note: Persons born abroad, must follow an administrative registration process to acquire nationality.)

=== By naturalisation ===
Naturalisation can be granted to persons who have resided in Namibia for a sufficient period of time to confirm they understand the customs and traditions of the country and the responsibilities of citizenship. General provisions are that applicants have good character and have had no convictions for offenses. Applicants must verify legal residency of a minimum of ten years. Besides foreigners meeting the criteria, other persons who may apply for naturalisation include:

- The legal or customary spouse of a Namibian national after a residency period of ten years;
- Children of a naturalised Namibian;
- Adoptees of Namibian nationals automatically acquire nationality upon completion of a legal adoption; or
- Persons who have provided distinguished service to the state may qualify for honorary nationality.

== Loss of nationality ==
Namibians are allowed to renounce their nationality, provided that comply with registration processes. The government may oppose during times of war. Nationals of origin cannot be deprived of their nationality. Naturalised persons can be denaturalised for obtaining another nationality; for committing serious crimes, disloyal acts, or crimes against the state or state security; for residing abroad for a continuous period of over two years without government permission; or for fraud, misrepresentation, or concealment in a naturalisation petition. Persons who have previously lost their Namibian naturalisation may repatriate as long as they have not acquired another nationality.

== Dual nationality ==
Namibia prohibits dual nationality for naturalised persons. Though the Citizenship Act prohibits dual nationality, the High Court of Namibia issued rulings in 2008 and 2011 confirming that nationals of origin cannot be deprived of their nationality.

== Commonwealth citizenship ==
A Namibian citizen is also a Commonwealth citizen by default, especially for those born on 21 March 1990 and after.

== History ==
=== African people and European contact (1482–1866) ===
Early inhabitants of the region were San and Khoekhoe speakers, which included the Damara and Nama peoples. Between the ninth and fourteenth centuries Zambezi people pushed the early inhabitants into the Kalahari Desert and established decentralised chieftainships. Herero people moved into the central plateau, creating a centralised state; while Kavango and Ovambo peoples built clan-based kingdoms with centralised authority in the north. In 1482, the Portuguese navigator Diogo Cão landed at Cape Cross and five years later, his countryman Bartolomeu Dias landed at Lüderitz Bay. There was very little exploration of the interior of what is now Namibia, because of its inaccessible coastline. By the late 1500s, the Dutch began attacking Portuguese trading forts along the African coast. The Dutch made three official explorations through the territory in 1670, 1677, and 1793 to determine if there were persons with whom they could establish trading in the area or if the land was beneficial as a refueling and victualling area.

By the 1760s, Americans were whaling in the coastal waters but within two decades both the British and Dutch had instituted measures to prohibit American vessels from the coastal areas. Until the 1780s, coastal indigenous people largely did not have involvement with the rival commercial foreigners, but slowly began to engage in trade with them to acquire iron and tobacco. In 1792, the Dutch East India Company which had claimed the coastline two years earlier, took possession of Walvis Bay. It was seized by the British in 1796, who also claimed the other natural harbour on the coast, Angra Pequena. The first half of the nineteenth century saw the destabilisation of African communities with territorial disputes arising both internally among chieftainships and with foreigners. American, British, Finnish, and German missionaries established a trading post at Otijibingue from which they traded firearms for cattle and ivory. Africans exploited European rivalries and in turn, Europeans utilised African competitiveness for territory and resources to weaken their ties with each other and strengthen their own relationships. In an effort to unite the southern people, the Peace Treaty of Hoachanas was signed with leaders of the Herero and Nama peoples and followed by an agreement barring the sale of land or mining concessions to colonists. The deaths of the Herero leaders, Jonker Afrikaner and Tjamuaha by 1861, led to the overthrow of Nama leader Oaseb's authority and allowed Europeans to assume dominant roles in policy making.

=== British and German possession (1866–1919) ===
In 1866, Britain claimed the Penguin Islands and annexed them into the Colony of the Cape of Good Hope. Twelve years later in 1878, Captain Richard C. Dyer claimed Walvis Bay and the surrounding area for Britain. In 1883, Adolf Lüderitz, merchant from Bremen, acquired a tract of land including Damaraland and Namaqualand from the native chief. The following year, the German Government authorised the colony, bordering Portuguese West Africa in the north, and the British Bechuanaland Protectorate in the east and the Cape Colony on the south, by declaring a protectorate of German South West Africa. Though the British government protested the German annexation, they did not take action, other than to annex Walvis Bay to the Cape Colony in 1884. That year, at the Berlin Conference, European powers agreed on the boundaries of South West Africa and endorsed the German possession of the colony.

==== Nationality in British South Africa ====
From the time of the Dutch Republic (1588–1795), belonging was based on birth in a Dutch city or province and could be acquired through marriage or application for admission. Its successor state, the Batavian Republic, established that inhabitants in the territory could acquire nationality by birth, and citizenship if they were born in Batavian territory and remained there for two years, or if they lived within the nation for ten years. The governmental form changed again in 1805, and in 1809 the Kingdom of Holland adopted the Napoleonic Code with adaptations for Holland. When the French Empire annexed the Dutch kingdom in 1810, the full French code was declared to apply to Dutch territory. Under its terms nationality was acquired at birth through descent from a father. Married women were legally incapacitated, making them legal dependents, and the nationality of a husband was automatically bestowed upon a wife. While the Netherlands was attempting to regain its independence from France, Britain moved against Dutch overseas possessions, and formally acquired the Cape of Good Hope under the terms of the Convention of London in 1814. British Nationality Acts did not extend beyond the bounds of the United Kingdom of Great Britain and Ireland, meaning that under Britain's rules of conquest, laws in place at the time of acquisition remained in place until changed. As a new Civil Code for the Netherlands was not adopted until 1838, the law in place at acquisition was the Napoleonic Code.

In 1817, Charles Henry Somerset, the Governor General of the Cape of Good Hope, issued a decree that foreigners could be granted a deed of burghership, after having lived in the colony for five years and taking an oath of allegiance. Further laws on naturalisation, which did not vary overmuch from the 1817 decree, were passed for the Cape colony in 1856, 1861, and 1868, which were repealed by the consolidation and amendment of 22 August 1883. Under the 1883 Act, male foreigners could naturalise upon providing proof of good character and no record of conviction for serious crimes (or had been pardoned if he had a conviction) and taking an oath of allegiance. It also provided that foreign women who married a British subject of the colony, were considered to be a naturalized subject of the Cape Colony, as were minor children born within the colony to a naturalized parent. The 1883 Act was amended in 1889 and 1906.

In 1909, the South Africa Act created the Union of South Africa and Britain officially transferred the Penguin Islands and Walvis Bay to the self-governing territory of the British Crown. To standardize the requirements for naturalisation in the Cape Colony, Colony of Natal, Orange Free State and the Transvaal Colony, the Naturalisation of Aliens Act of 23 December 1910, replaced and repealed the individual acts of naturalisation which had previously been in place in those colonies. In 1911, at the Imperial Conference a decision was made to draft a common nationality code for use across the empire. Other than common law, there was no standard statutory law which applied for subjects throughout the realm, meaning different jurisdictions created their own legislation for local conditions, which often conflicted with the laws in other jurisdictions in the empire. Thus, a person who was naturalised in Canada, for example, would be considered a foreigner, rather than a British national, in Australia or South Africa. For example, from 1861 in the Cape Colony, foreign husbands who married British wives could naturalise based on their wife's residency in the colony.

The British Nationality and Status of Aliens Act 1914 allowed local jurisdictions in the self-governing territories to continue regulating nationality in their jurisdictions, but also established an imperial nationality scheme for use throughout the realm. Under its terms, common law provisions were reiterated for natural-born persons born within the realm on or after the effective date. By using the word person, the statute nullified legitimacy requirements for jus soli nationals, meaning an illegitimate child could derive nationality from its mother. For those born abroad on or after the effective date, legitimacy was still required, and could only be derived by a child from a British father (one generation), who was natural-born or naturalised. It also provided that a married woman derived her nationality from her spouse, meaning if he was British, she was also, and if he was foreign, so was she. It stipulated that upon loss of nationality of a husband, a wife could declare that she wished to remain British. It allowed that if a marriage had terminated, through death or divorce, a British-born national who had lost her status through marriage could reacquire British nationality through naturalisation without meeting a residency requirement. The statute specified that a five-year residency or service to the Crown was required for naturalisation.

==== Nationality in German South West Africa ====
Under the terms of the German Colonial Act of 1888, German colonies were not part of the federal union, but they were also not considered foreign. Thus, laws that were extended to the colonies sometimes treated residents as nationals and other times as foreigners. German law applied to those subjects who had been born in Germany. Native subjects in the colonies were not considered to be German, but were allowed to naturalise. Naturalisation required ten years residence in the territory and proof of self-employment. It was automatically bestowed upon all members of a family, meaning children and wives derived the nationality of the husband. Fearful that African women and mixed-race children might derive German nationality, legislation was passed to retroactively invalidate interracial marriages deprive spouses and offspring of German nationality. Registration offices were also ordered not to record mixed marriages.

Unhappy with German rule, rebellion broke out in 1904. Led by Herero chief Samuel Maherero, German settlements were attacked with the Herero quickly gaining control of most of the territory in Hereroland. The war lasted for four years, resulting in the massacre of more than half of the Herero, Damara, and Nama populations in South West Africa. When the war ended, the German administration established geographic segregation districts, with white settlers confined to the south of the territory and Africans confined to the north. The Nationality Law of 1913 changed the basis for acquiring German nationality from domicile to patrilineality, but did not alter derivative nationality.

On the first official day of World War I, a subcommittee of the British Committee of Imperial Defence recommended the seizure of German South West Africa. On 7 August 1914, the government authorized South Africa to seize South West Africa for Britain in exchange for territory in Luderitzbucht and Swakopmund. Germany surrendered South West Africa to the British on 9 July 1915 and the territory was occupied by the South African military until the war ended. At the 1919 Peace Conference of Versailles, Britain made it clear that it did not want direct control in administering South West Africa. When the mandate system was proposed, Britain agreed to the proposal with the intent of substituting its administration for that of its colony, South Africa.

=== South African mandate/trust territory (1919–1966) ===
Treaty of Peace and South West Africa Mandate Act 49 of 1919 established the local framework for the administration of South West Africa by South Africa. It was ratified in 1921 and in 1923, the Council of the League of Nations adopted a resolution that the administrator of a mandate could not confer nationality upon the native inhabitants, leaving them stateless. (Note: A commission was convened in 1946 to review nationality of the inhabitants in former German colonies. It concluded that inhabitants of mandates did not acquire nationality from the trustee and if they had been German nationals under the terms of the 1913 Nationality law, they became stateless when Germany abandoned its territories. According to D. P. O'Connell, they were deemed to be "lacking nationality but enjoying an administrative status analogous to that of inhabitants of British protectorates".) This was not the case for white settlers and South Africa granted the status of British subject to Germans residing in the territory from 1924. In 1926, South Africa passed the British Nationality in the Union and Naturalisation and Status of Aliens Act. Under its terms, persons born in the territory, persons born abroad to a father who was a British subject, or persons born upon a British ship became British subjects. Additionally, persons who had resided or been employed by the crown for an accumulated five years over an eight-year period, who were literate (in a language of South Africa), and intended to reside in the territory, were allowed to naturalise. Naturalisation or denaturalisation of a father automatically changed the status of his minor children. However, children who had been denaturalised could request reinstatement within one year of reaching majority. Widows who had originally been British subjects, whose foreign spouse had died, were also allowed to naturalise. Under the provisions of Chapter III, Section 12, foreign wives of British subjects automatically became British subjects upon marriage and British women who married foreign husbands automatically lost the status of British subject upon marriage.

The Union Nationality and Flags Act 40, passed on 11 November 1927 specified that British subjects residing in the territories of the Union of South Africa and any child born in the territory on or after 1 June 1928, who was not an alien or barred immigrant, were considered both Union nationals and British subjects. Also eligible to be Union nationals were British subjects who lived in the Union territory continuously for two years; persons who were naturalized British subjects, not prohibited from immigration, and had continuously had a domicile in South Africa for three years; persons born abroad to a father who was a Union national at the time of their birth; or the wife of a Union national. Women who married persons who were foreigners were not eligible to be Union nationals. Because natives of South West Africa were not British subjects under the rules of the mandate, they were also not allowed to become Union nationals. In 1931, passage of the Statute of Westminster limited the powers of the Parliament of the United Kingdom to legislate on behalf of its Dominions — Australia, Canada, the Irish Free State, Newfoundland, New Zealand, and South Africa — declaring them all to be equal, self-governing states, united by their allegiance to Britain, with the authority for managing their own internal and external affairs. The Nationalisation and Amnesty Act of 1932 confirmed that those who had become Union nationals on or after the Union and Nationality and Flags Act of 1927 was effective and those who became residents after the effective date in 1932, were Union nationals.

At the end of World War II, South Africa made an official request to annex South West Africa. The request was denied by the United Nations, the successor to the League of Nations. Though there was strong opposition to incorporation among the native inhabitants of South West Africa, the South African government held a referendum and reported to the UN that the majority of South West Africans supported the proposal. Chiefs of the Damaras, Hereros, Nama and Ovambos, protested directly to the British High Commissioner and led a campaign against annexation. The British government supported annexation, but the UN rejected the proposal and instead designated the country as a Trust Territory. South Africa refused to accept the decision and launched a legal challenge to the UN jurisdiction. In 1950, the International Court of Justice ruled against South Africa confirming the lawful administration under the UN. In 1948, the policy of Apartheid was instituted through various legislation, which has had a lasting impact on statelessness for many persons who were native or descended from South West Africans, as birth registration was not mandatory or routine.

In 1949, South Africa promulgated the Citizenship Act 44, which automatically conferred Union nationality, in Section 2.2, upon the inhabitants who had been born in South West Africa at the time the act became operable. It specifically included those persons who had previously been stateless as defined by the mandate. Under its terms, persons who had previously been British nationals, including their wives who had previously been British subjects, or persons who were born or legally domiciled in South West Africa were considered Union nationals. For those born after the effective date of the statue, nationality was derived at birth by being born in the territory to a father who was neither an enemy alien, prohibited immigrant, nor who had diplomatic immunity; or born abroad to a father who was born in South Africa or South West Africa, or to a father who was naturalised as South African. Commonwealth citizens were allowed to obtain nationality through registration after a cumulative residency of four years over a six-year period. Naturalisation required a literacy in a language of the Union, evidence of no confinement for offences or mental illness, and proof of a cumulative residency of five years over a seven-year period. Wives of South Africans who were lawful residents for three years were able to naturalise.

In 1960, Ethiopia and Liberia instituted proceedings in the International Court of Justice against South Africa for breaching their obligations toward South West Africa under their trusteeship, but were found not to have standing. On 31 May 1961, the Union of South Africa left the Commonwealth and became the Republic of South Africa. Exactly one year later, the South Africa Act 1962 provided that persons who had been British subjects by virtue of Union nationality were no longer British; however, transitional provisions gave persons until 1 January 1966 to register as British nationals under the British Nationality Act 1948 if they met the criteria for British registration. From 1962, the United Nations supported the independence movement and sought solutions to bring about independence for South West Africa. On 27 October 1966, the United Nations revoked (GA resolution 2145 (XXI)) the trusteeship of South Africa over South West Africa. Britain did not accept the revocation by the United Nations, but admitted that South Africa had violated the terms of its administration. The revocation was upheld by the International Court of Justice.

=== South African occupation (1967–1990) ===
On 19 May 1967, the United Nations General Assembly passed resolution 2248 establishing administration for the territory by the United Nations Council for South West Africa. In 1968, the territory was officially renamed Namibia. In 1971, the United Nations Security Council asked the International Court of Justice to rule on South Africa's continued presence in Namibia. The court concluded South Africa was illegally occupying the territory and should withdraw; however, no change occurred. In both 1976 and 1977 United Nations resolutions decreed that Walvis Bay and the Penguin Islands were an integral part of Namibia. Both Britain and South Africa disagreed, as the territory had never been part of the German colony and had been transferred in 1884 to the administration of the Cape Colony. In 1978, Security Council Resolution 432 supported taking necessary steps to reintegrate Walvis Bay and the Penguins into Namibia. Britain supported the resolution. That year, sanctions against South Africa were proposed in Resolution 435, which advocated for a Pan-African solution to the occupation of Namibia and its ultimate independence. Though attempts were made until 1982 to implement the strategy, none succeeded. Between 1984 and 1988, negotiations focused on setting a timetable for Namibian independence. Finally bowing to internal rebellion and international pressure South Africa agreed to begin the process of allowing Namibian independence in December 1988. A constitution for Namibia was drafted and adopted on 9 February 1990.

=== Post-independence (1990–present) ===
Namibia became independent on 21 March 1990 as a Commonwealth republic Under the terms of the constitution, persons born in Namibia prior to independence to a Namibian, or a parent who was an ordinary resident of Namibia who did not have diplomatic immunity or was not in the employ of another government at the time of the child's birth acquired Namibian nationality. In addition, for a one-year period, persons who had been ordinary residents for a continuous five years prior to independence could register as nationals, providing that they renounced any other allegiance. Those born after independence, acquired nationality on the same terms as those born prior to independence with the exception that if the parents were not Namibian, they had to have been legal immigrants. Children born abroad acquired nationality by having been registered to a parent who was Namibian or who would have been Namibian if the constitution had been in force at the time the parent was born.

The constitution provided for passage of a nationality statute to define the means of acquisition of nationality through naturalisation or by having performed exemplary service to the nation, and such legislation was passed as the Namibian Citizenship Act 14, on 15 September 1990. Under its terms, persons of majority could acquire nationality by having resided in Namibia for five years, and could prove their good character and understanding of the responsibilities of citizenship. Naturalisation required renunciation of any other nationality. It also established honorary citizenship for those who had performed exemplary services to the nation. Dual nationality was prohibited under Section 26 for all Namibians. Provisions defining loss of nationality for naturalised persons included service in the armed forces of a foreign nation without authorisation from Namibian authorities. Naturalised Namibians can also be denaturalised for disloyal or treasonous acts, criminal offences which result in a sentence of twelve months or more, or had been a prohibited immigrant immediately prior to acquiring nationality. Persons deprived of other nationality by a foreign state can lose Namibian nationality, unless they would become stateless. On 7 December 1991, the Namibian Citizenship (Special Conferment) Act No.14, an amendment to the Citizenship Act, was passed, which allowed those who had become refugees prior to 1915 of the Herero and Namaqua genocide and their descendants to acquire Namibian nationality.

Instruments were passed in 1993 in South Africa and 1994 in Namibia to transfer Walvis Bay and the Penguin Islands back to Namibia. The Walvis Bay and Off-Shore Islands Act 1 of 1994 provided that those who at the time of territorial reinstatement had until 31 May 1994 to either become a permanent resident of Namibia, or, if they had lived in Walvis Bay or the islands for five years and had not committed serious crimes, apply for naturalisation as Namibian. Those who chose to naturalise were required to renounce other nationality and their allegiance to South Africa. Cases brought in the High Court, such as Tlhoro v Minister of Home Affairs (2008 (1) NR 97 HC) and Le Roux v Minister of Home Affairs and Immigration (2011 (2) NR 606 HC), successfully overturned the prohibition for those born as Namibians to hold dual nationality. In 2010, a constitutional amendment lengthened the residency term required to acquire nationality by marriage or naturalisation from two and five years, respectively, to ten years. In 2016, a legal case De Wilde v Minister of Home Affairs (SA 48/2014 [2016] NASC 12 of 23 June 2016, also cited as MW v Minister of Home Affairs 2016 (3) NR 707 SC) brought before the Supreme Court of Namibia determined that "ordinary residence" was not the same as permanent residence. They ruled that ordinary residence required proof that Namibia was a person's habitual residence, which could be demonstrated by continuously living or working in the territory, the sale of assets or property in another country, or the renewal of work permits or other activities which established a settled life in Namibia. In an attempt to circumvent the ruling, the government proposed a bill to equate ordinary residence with permanent residency. A committee was formed to conduct a public consultation, which found the bill to be unconstitutional and it was withdrawn.
