= Jan Jonker Afrikaner =

Captain of the Orlam Afrikaners (1820–1889)

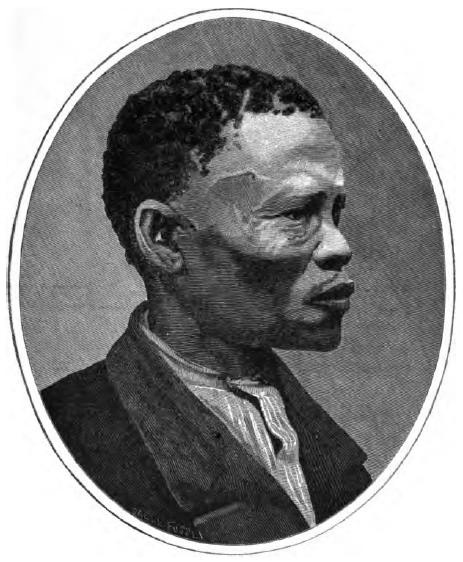

Captain of the Orlam Afrikaners
- Reign: 1863 – 10 August 1889
- Predecessor: Christian Afrikaner
- Successor: Position abolished
- Born: 2 August 1820; Bethanie, South West Africa
- Died: 10 August 1889 (aged 69); Mariental, Namibia

Jan Jonker Afrikaner (2 August 1820 – 10 August 1889) was the second oldest son of Jonker Afrikaner and Beetje Boois. He became the sixth and last Captain of the Orlam Afrikaners in South West Africa, succeeding his brother Christian Afrikaner in 1863. He married Mietje Hendrik in Bethanie in December 1842.

During his leadership, the Orlam were in conflict with the Herero people over land and cattle. However European traders in Otjimbingwe, who contributed to these proxy conflicts such as Charles John Andersson and Frederick Thomas Green saw the war impact trade, and sided with the Herero army. Consequently, the Herero were mobilized and were able to dominate the Orlam.

On 22 June 1864, there was a decisive battle in which Jan Jonker Afrikaner's forces were defeated by Maharero. He remained leader however, the Afrikaner tribe lost their position of political dominance in the area that is today central Namibia. In December 1867 he had to flee to Walvis Bay after he unsuccessfully tried to attack Otjimbingwe. In November 1881 Jan Jonker, with his Witbooi allies, were defeated by the Ovaherero in the Battle of Osona. Jan Jonker fled to the Gamsberg area.
