= Palgrave Commission =

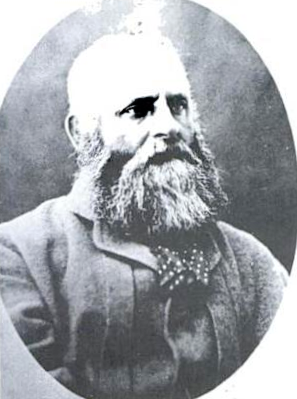
William Coates Palgrave, Special Commissioner 1876–1885

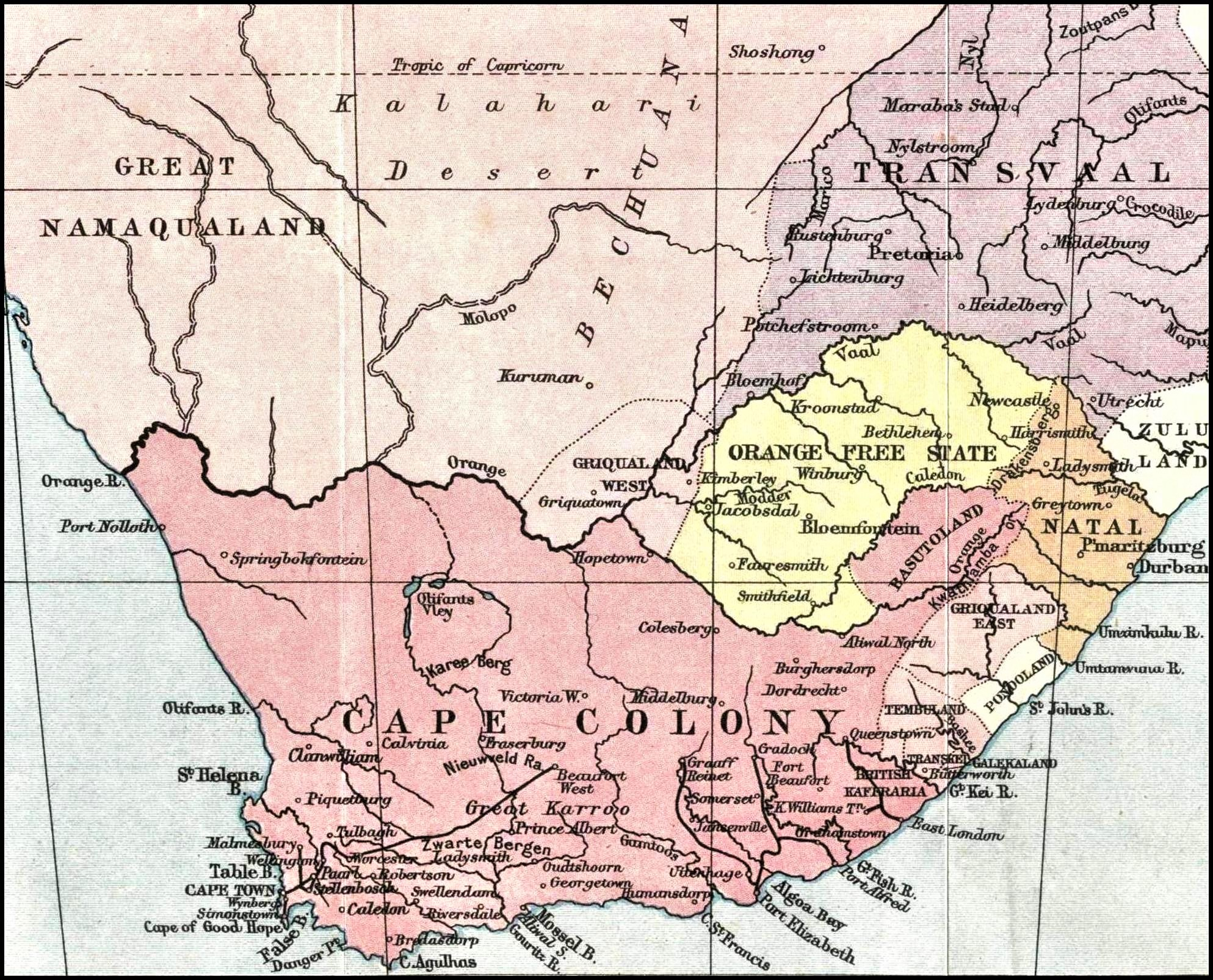
Map of the Cape Colony (dark pink), with South West Africa (labeled "Great Namaqualand") stretching to the north.

The Palgrave Commission (1876–1885) was a series of diplomatic missions undertaken by Special Commissioner William Coates Palgrave (1833–1897) to the territory of South West Africa (modern Namibia). Palgrave was commissioned by the Cape Government to meet with the leaders of the nations of Hereroland and Namaland, hear their wishes regarding political sovereignty, and relay the assembled information to the Cape Colony Government.

In the early 1870s, South West Africa was torn by internecine warfare and threatened with impending invasion and colonisation by Portugal, Germany and the Boers. In desperation, several local leaders requested incorporation into the relatively peaceful Cape Colony, with the promise of equal representation in the Cape Parliament. The Cape Government commissioned Palgrave to investigate, and Palgrave recommended that South West Africa be incorporated into the Cape and its inhabitants granted equal political rights.

This would have resulted in a new state, comprising the Cape and modern Namibia. However the breakdown in relations between the local Cape government and the British Imperial government prevented it from being implemented. The region remained vulnerable without a unified state structure, and was taken over and colonised by Germany soon afterwards.

== History ==
=== Background ===
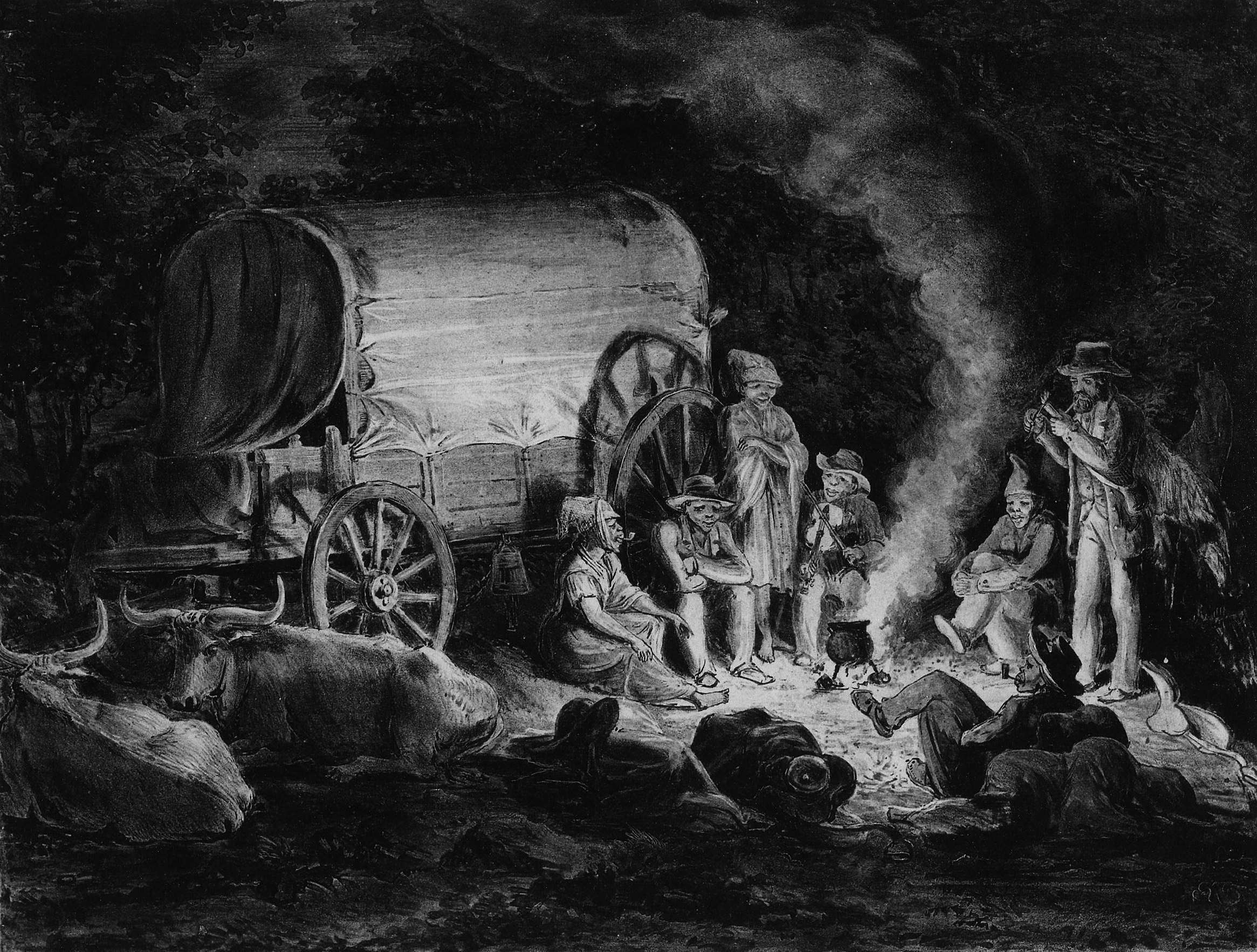
Early drawing of a camp of Basters or Oorlams, from the Cape frontier.

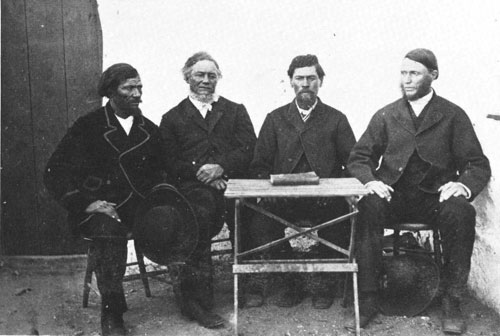
1872 photograph of the Baster Council. The book on the table is the Baster constitution.

In the 19th century, the frontiers of the Cape Colony and the neighbouring Boer republics were inhabited by expanding waves of semi-nomadic farmers. These Afrikaans-speaking nomads included the mixed-race Oorlam, Griqua and Baster nations as well as the white Trekboers. Leaving the colonies, they spilled over into neighbouring territories and entered into clashes with the pre-existing African peoples.

In South West Africa, which was as yet uncolonised by Europeans, incursions from the south by mounted gunmen of the Oorlam people began in the late 18th century. After decades of war with the Damara, Nama and Herero people, they established a powerful semi-nomadic state in the area of modern Windhoek, under their dynamic leader Jan Jonker Afrikaner.

In 1868, a second group, the Basters, began to push north into South West Africa. In the ensuing conflict with the other nations of the area, they established a republic and parliament in 1872, around the settlement of Rehoboth. From the 1870s however, increasing numbers of white Trekboers began to enter South West Africa from the east, causing even worse internecine warfare.

Furthermore, as the scramble for Africa loomed, several observant local leaders became aware that full European colonisation of the territory was probably on the way.

=== Creation of the Commission (1876) ===
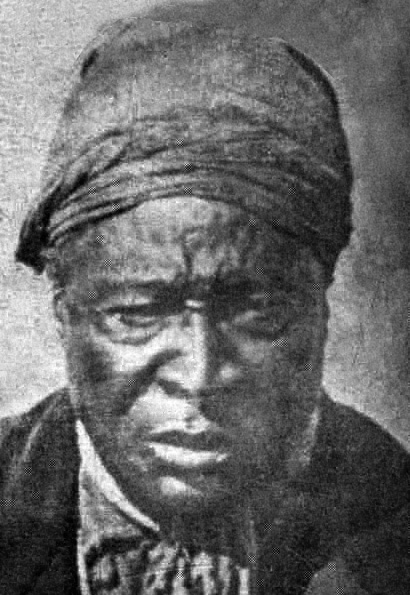
Maharero, the powerful Herero leader, sought to preempt a Boer invasion.

In this context, the great Herero leader Maharero, still engaged in a bitter war with the Oorlam leader Jonker Afrikaner, heard rumours of a large body of white Trekboers preparing to leave the Transvaal Boer Republic to invade South West Africa and establish another Boer republic there. These rumours were in fact correct, as the "Dorsland Trekkers" were mobilising, and their great migration was soon to begin.

Motivated by the combined severity of the situation, from 1874 Maharero began sending diplomatic missions southwards, to the Parliament of the Cape of Good Hope.

The Cape, under its local system of "Responsible Government", had recently attained a degree of independence from the British Empire. Its locally elected parliament was viewed by many in southern Africa as being relatively benign and inclusive, as compared to the other more oppressive states of the region. It implemented a multi-racial franchise, laws prohibiting racial discrimination and legal protection of African traditional land from white appropriation. Maharero therefore chose the Cape for his overture, first requesting long-term assistance and protection, and later requesting incorporation of his people into the Cape's parliamentary democracy.

The Cape Parliament responded to Maharero's request with a set of proposed scenarios. On the one extreme, some parliamentary factions favoured total non-involvement. On the other extreme, many favoured full annexation to the Cape Colony with all the political rights that would entail. The Cape Prime Minister John Molteno concluded that the final decision would depend on the views and wishes of the various nations of South West Africa, and that a delegation must immediately depart to consult them and report back.

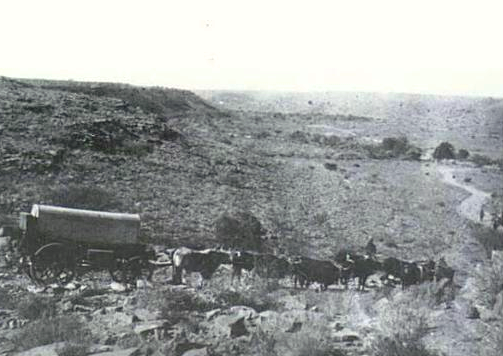
Wagons of the Palgrave Mission, travelling near Kunjas.

To head the commission, Molteno chose William Palgrave, a gentle and learned man who had spent many years living with the Herero and knew many of the traditional leaders personally. Palgrave initially declined. He claimed that his personal friendships with some of the Herero leaders, such as Maharero and Shikongo, meant that he could not be fully impartial with regard to the region's conflicts. Charles Brownlee was therefore temporarily suggested as a replacement. However, on Molteno's insistence, Palgrave accepted. So finally, in 1876, Palgrave entered the arid vastness of South West Africa as "Special Commissioner to Hereroland and Namaland", with a multi-ethnic assemblage of personnel and a long train of ox-wagons.

=== Palgrave's 5 missions ===
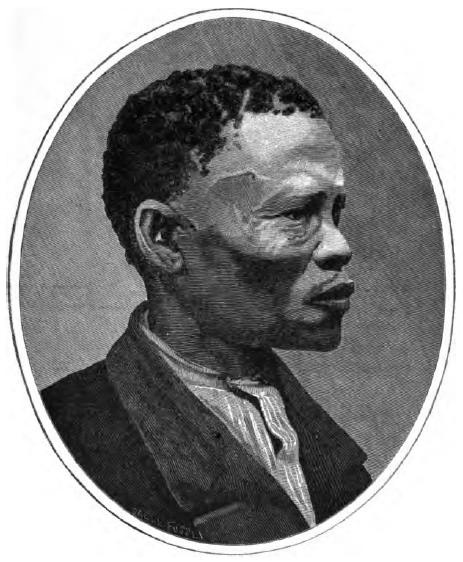
Jan Jonker Afrikaner, warlord and powerful leader of the Afrikaans-speaking Oorlam people.

Palgrave undertook a total of 5 commissions to South West Africa, of which the first were the biggest.

Travel was arduous and dangerous, in a desert country with no infrastructure and unsettled nomads. However Palgrave knew much of the country well from his youth, and many of his personnel were local men who were also knowledgeable of the enormous land. They generally travelled at night, so as to avoid the deadly heat of the desert. When arriving in settlements like Okahandja, Walvis Bay and Otjimbingwe, they were usually expected, and treated as honoured guests by the local leaders.

Initially, before leaving Cape Town, Palgrave's opinion had been that a simple bilateral treaty and the posting of a magistrate for each nation would suffice to protect and ensure peace in the region. On seeing the current state of the country though, he personally came to feel that full annexation was the only way to bring about peace.

==== First Commission ====
In his 1st commission, Palgrave visited Maharero and his government, as well as the local leaders of Omaruru and Ameib, the Basters, the Nama, Damaras, Bondelswarts and the powerful and expansionist Oorlam people of Jonker Afrikaner.

His report back to the Cape Parliament was that Maharero formally requested full incorporation, with a magistrate specifically to be based in his own town of Okahandja. The other nations, suffering from the internecine strife, likewise requested incorporation by treaty. Notably, he reported that the Oorlam wished to remain sovereign.

However his conclusion was that annexation was overwhelmingly favoured by the leaders and people of the region, and that it was the only way of ending the devastating warfare that was engulfing the region.

Back in Cape Town, additional recommendations included:

- Establishing a magistrate-system, centred on Okahandja, with field-cornets in the smaller settlements. The Cape Parliament would be expanded to represent the additional voters.
- A recognition of any customary tribal laws, such as did not conflict with fundamental rights to life and property and which did not involve violence or "marauding".
- The ensuring that, before accession, each tribe's leadership was entirely aware of (and in accordance with) the main body of Cape law as it applied to them
- Agreeing with the local leaders on the introduction of additional laws to prevent the flow of liquor imports into the country.

The Cape government immediately agreed to incorporation, but other forces were at play in southern Africa that would prevent it.

==== Fall-out between the Cape and the British government ====
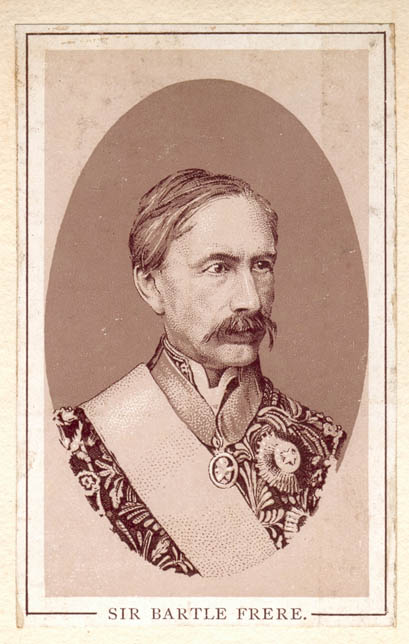
British Governor Bartle Frere

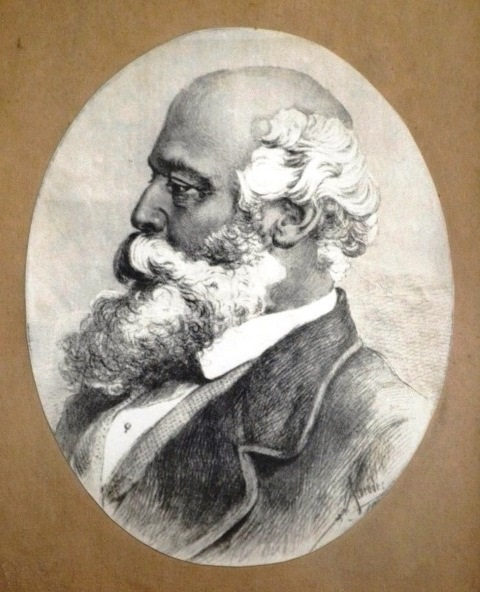
Cape Prime Minister John Molteno

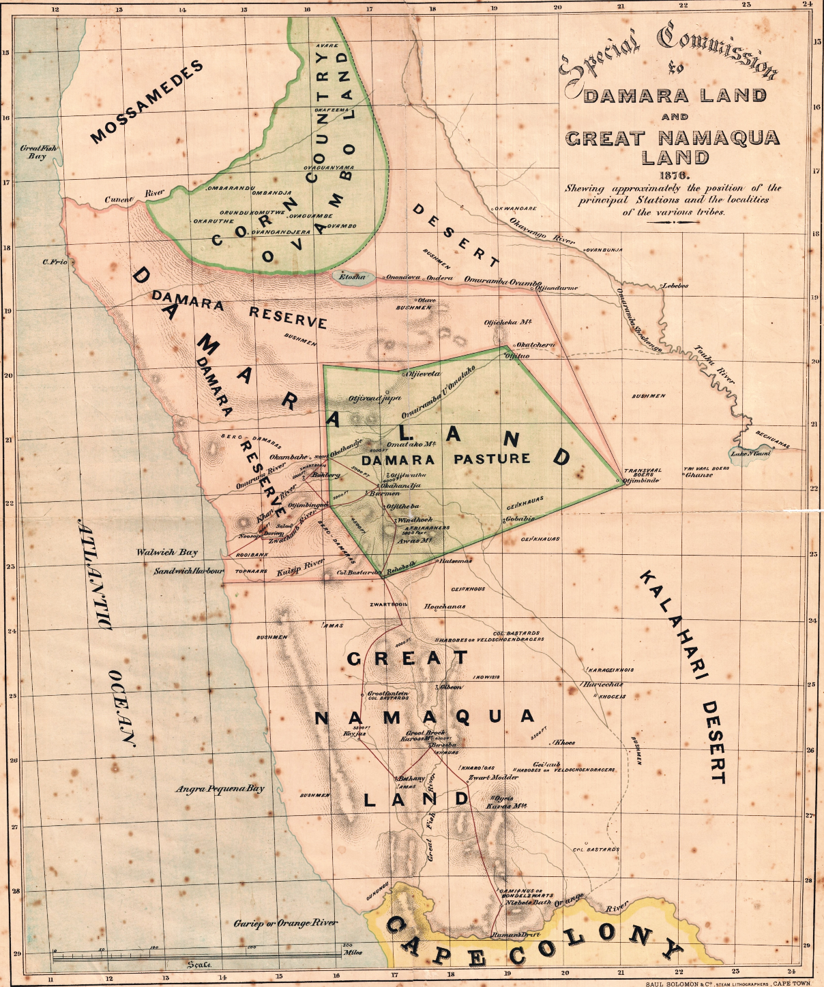
1876 map from the Palgrave Commission

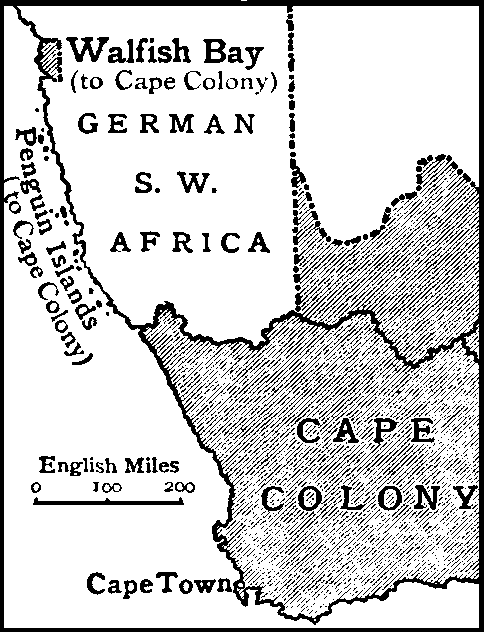
While Walvis Bay and the offshore islands was incorporated into the Cape, the rest of the country remained open to the German colonisers in the 1880s.

Palgrave's commission was increasingly undermined by the growing tension between the local Cape government and the British Empire.

The Cape Colony had attained a degree of independence, but its first Prime Minister, John Molteno, was engaged in a growing struggle with the British Governor, Sir Henry Bartle Frere for control over the Cape's external relations (of which Palgrave's commission formed a part). This caused the British Imperial Government first to push for the annexation, but then to actively forestall it as a way of putting pressure on the Cape government. This fatally undermined Palgrave's work.

Nonetheless, aside from any humanitarian considerations, the Cape began to have serious strategic reasons for wanting to secure South West Africa. It correctly predicted the invasion of this area by an imperialist European power (in this case, Imperial Germany), and it wished to protect the flank of the new Kimberley diamond fields. It was also very aware of the need to secure the only viable harbour of the region (Walvis Bay) and the trade routes to the north.

The British government believed it to be a strife-torn territory which was of no significant value. A reflection of its ignorance of the land was Lord Carnarvon's belief that Walvis Bay was the port for Kimberley. The British government wanted to implement a system of confederation in Southern Africa under British control. The Cape government rejected this Confederation plan, as it predicted (correctly) that it would lead to war with the Boer Republics. However, Bartle Frere used his ability to obstruct the implementation of Palgrave's work as a tactical tool, to pressurise the Cape government to agree to confederation.

Failing to persuade the Cape government, Bartle Frere dissolved it, and assumed direct control of the country to enforce the Confederation system. The Confederation plan collapsed as predicted, culminating in the Anglo-Zulu War and the First Boer War.

In a peculiar step, the incorporation of Walvis Bay and the offshore islands was then authorised by the British in 1878, while the rest of the country remained in legal limbo until the Germans arrived.

==== Subsequent Commissions ====
Palgrave's following trips coincided with a sharp deterioration in the conditions in South West Africa.

Among the overall rise in violence, notable was the renewed military expansion of Jonker Afrikaner's Oorlam. Meanwhile, the Herero polity began to fragment, the Basters came under growing attack, and the migration of Boer "Thirst Trekkers" approached from the Transvaal (in the end, in fact, for all the fear they generated among the locals, the trekkers ended up in a state of near starvation in the Kaokoveld, decimated by the harsh climate.)

Related to the rise in violence, local leaders' trust in Palgrave declined. Maharero, no longer relying directly on Palgrave, sent his son Willem on a diplomatic mission to Cape Town to negotiate with the new pro-imperialist Prime Minister, John Gordon Sprigg. The Oorlam broke off relations completely, and Palgrave even had to flee the fighting as further fighting broke out between the Herero and the Nama, and his staff largely deserted him. As the various political factions in the British administration of the Cape disagreed and delayed, the unrest in South West Africa continued. Finally, as predicted, the German Colonisers arrived.

=== German invasion (1884) ===
The first German settlement at Lüderitz.

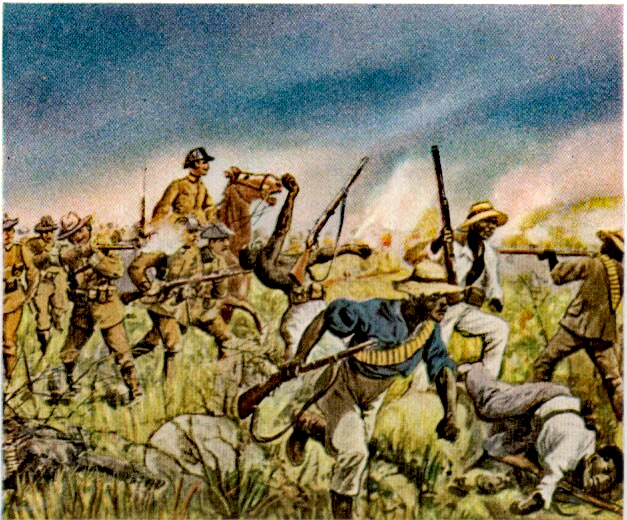
German troops in combat with the Herero in a painting by Richard Knötel.

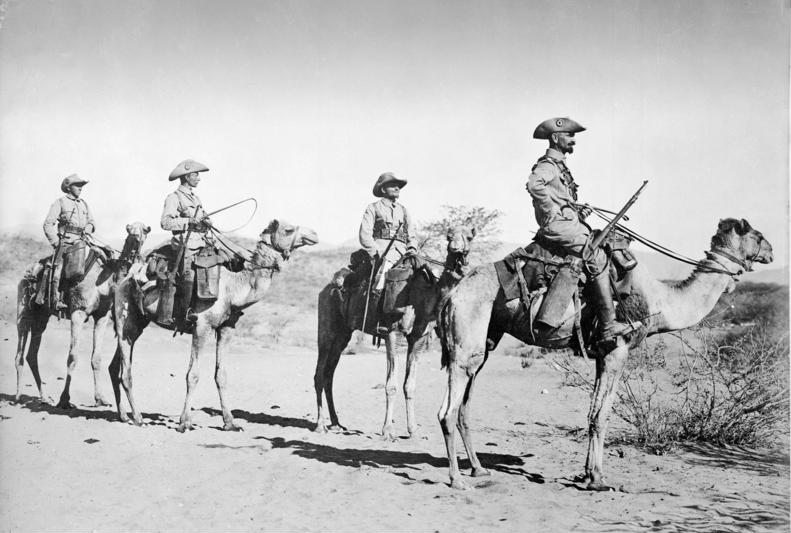
German colonial troops, 1906.

In 1883, a German trader, Adolf Lüderitz bought a section of coast, renamed it after himself, and advised the German chancellor Otto von Bismarck to annex and occupy South West Africa, before the Cape did. In 1884 Bismarck did so, thereby establishing German South West Africa as a colony (Deutsch-Südwestafrika in German).

Too late, the Cape tried to forestall the German invasion. Surrounded by bitter accusations from his former staff and in the context of the German expansion, Palgrave departed for his 5th and final commission in 1884. Once again, he conveyed a desperate request for incorporation from Maharero and other leaders. Once again, the British Imperial Government adopted its own course and vacillated, and when Palgrave arrived back in Cape Town he learned that the Imperial government had recognised German authority over the South West African hinterland.

=== Aftermath and legacy ===
The failure of the Palgrave Commission was due primarily due to ill-advised interference in the affairs of southern Africa by the British Colonial Office in London, whose obstruction of the commission led to German colonisation of South West Africa. The subsequent wars, rebellions and resulting Herero and Namaqua Genocide all ensued from German colonisation.

However, it is difficult to hypothesize on what would have resulted if the Palgrave Commission had succeeded. The hypothetical enlarged state would have included the entire (predominantly mixed-race and Afrikaans-speaking) western half of southern Africa, corresponding largely to the dry, winter-rainfall climatic area, and holding abundant mineral resources. It would also have inherited a relatively liberal, inclusive and multi-racial political system. Had it not been united with the Boer republics and the Johannesburg mines that seeded apartheid, it is possible that this region would have avoided that most unfortunate part of history. A social development akin to that of Brazil might have followed, but with no way of predicting either way, no judgement can be made.

Palgrave himself became increasingly critical, both of the Herero and Nama leadership, and of the British authorities he was working for. Having worked for nearly a decade on a project that was now a failure, he retired. The question has yet to be resolved, of whether he was a hard-working and well-intentioned diplomat attempting to pre-empt the German colonial invasion, or whether he was merely another agent of oppressive colonialism.

== See also ==
- History of Namibia
- Maharero
- Union of South Africa
- Penguin Islands
