= Battle of Boomplaats =

1848 battle between the British Empire and Boers in modern South Africa

- Part of the Great Trek
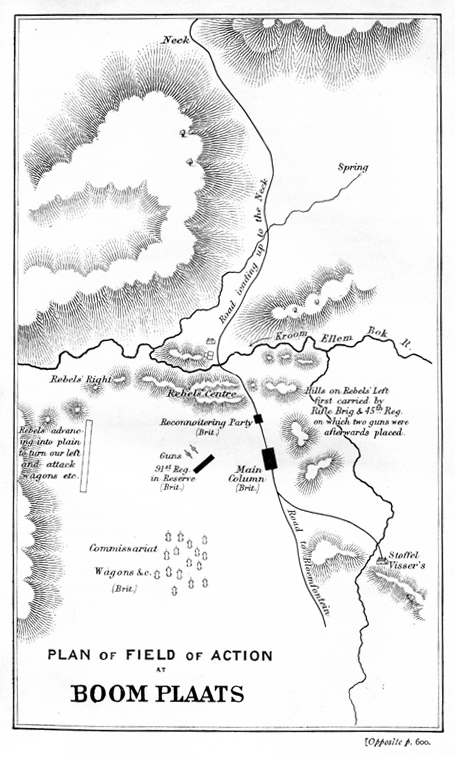
- Battle of Boomplaats
Date	29 August 1848
Location	near the Orange River
Result	British victory

Belligerents
United Kingdom	(South African Republic) (Orange Free State) Boers

Commanders and leaders
Sir Harry Smith	Andries Pretorius

Strength
1,200	300–500

Casualties and losses
22 killed 1 executed	9 killed 1 executed

The Battle of Boomplaats (also referred to as the Battle of Boomplaas) was fought near Jagersfontein at 29°50′53.47″S 25°38′56.54″E on 29 August 1848 between the British and the Voortrekkers. The British were led by Sir Harry Smith, while the Boers were led by Andries Pretorius. The British were victorious after one Boer opened fire too early and betrayed their position.

== Background ==
Sir Harry Smith assumed the role of Governor of the Cape in 1847 and begun to unravel the work of the previous governor Sir Peregrine Maitland, who had reached agreements with the Basotho and the Griqua leaders which would help maintain British control of the region between the Vaal and Orange Rivers. Smith declared to the Griqua leader Adam Kok that all rent of their land to colonists would be given to the British Crown as opposed to the Griqua leaders getting half of it, while at the meeting with Basotho King Moshoeshoe, he declared while the white farmers would remain on the land in the area, the hereditary land rights of the native chiefs in the area would be maintained after a proclamation of the proposed Orange River Sovereignty.

The Boers had an interest in land that stretched from Potchefstroom to Winburg and beyond. Smith had assured Andries Pretorius that he would not proclaim the land between the two rivers as British until the views of the Boers had been consulted and if less than 80 percent of them were in favour of the British action, Smith said he would not proceed with the proclamation. This Boer consultation period was never able to be completed by Pretorius. Without consulting the Voortrekkers concerning their interests in the territory, Sir Harry Smith annexed the land between the Vaal and Orange Rivers and Drakensberg on 3 February 1848 as British, calling it the Orange River Sovereignty. The Boers in Winburg upset by the British action appealed to Pretorius for help regain their independence and by June 1848 he raised a commando of around 1000 men. Pretorius responded by advancing on Winburg and ran the British magistrate Thomas Biddulph out of town and declared a republic. He then proceeded to chase away other British magistrates before he then headed to Bloemfontein where the British Resident Major Henry Warden was installed with 70 men of the Cape Corps. He appealed for help from the Basotho King Moshoeshoe I, but he remained neutral, so Warden retreated from Bloemfontein to the Orange River.

Smith issued orders for a British force to be formed by Colonel George Buller and it reached King William's Town by 28 July and then left on 4 August after other units joined him and proceeded to Colesberg where more units joined as did Sir Harry Smith. By 25 August 1848, the British force had arrived at the Orange River crossing point. Reports came to Smith that the Boer Commando were within 16 km of the river crossing and were being watched by Boer patrols and when the British crossed the river by 26 August unopposed, headed in the direction of Bloemfontein while Pretorius' commando repositioned to oppose them around Boomplaats.

== Order of battle ==
=== British - Sir Harry Smith ===
- four companies Cape Mounted Rifles
- two companies Rifle Brigade
- two companies 45th Regiment
- two companies 91st Highlanders Regiment
- three field guns Royal Artillery
- Sappers unit
- Medical unit
- 200-250 Griquas - Andries Waterboer and Adam Kok

=== Boers - Commandant-General Andries Pretorius ===
- 300-500 Boer commandos

== Battle ==
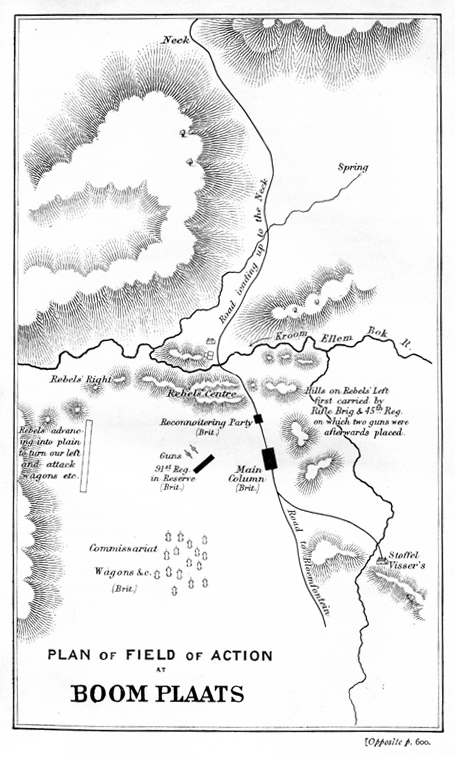
Plan of the Battle of Boomplaats.

On the morning of 29 August 1848, the British column stopped at a farm at Touwfontein for their morning meal and at this time Sir Harry Smith was told that Pretorius' force was 19 km away on low hills behind which was a river, across which was a farm called Boomplaats and a higher range behind it with the road heading through a pass. By early afternoon, British forces arrived at a flat plain in front of Pretorius' location in the hills and with Smith leading a reconnaissance party to a ridge where they were surprised by the Boers. He divided his forces for an attack with his left flank consisting of the Cape Mounted Rifles, the 45th Regiment in the centre and the Rifle Brigade on the right flank while 91st Regiment became his reserve. The 45th Regiment came under heavy fire but achieved their objectives when the reserve was called in to assist them. The Rifle Brigade on the right flank would also take their objectives. The Boers attempted to round the British left flank and attack the wagon train in the rear but were stopped by the Cape Mounted Rifles and the Boer hill positions were taken. The battle was said to have lasted about four hours with the Boers moving from ridge to ridge before Pretorius' forces retreated toward Winburg. The British forces followed for a few kilometers before darkness fell and continued the following day but the Boers were gone. A field hospital was set up later at the Boomplaats farmhouse for the casualties sustained in the fighting.

== Aftermath ==
Boer casualties are recorded in memorials as 9 killed and 7 wounded while a British government notice of the time records the rebel casualties as 49 killed and possibly 150 wounded. British memorials record 16 killed and while other records mention as many as 45 wounded and 6 Griquas killed though and a high number of unrecorded wounded. One of the Boers, Thomas Frederik Hermanus Dreyer, was taken prisoner after his horse ran away. Dreyer was tried for rebelling against the British colonial government at a court-martial in Bloemfontein, sentenced to death, and executed by firing squad on 4 September 1848. He was shot alongside a British soldier, Michael Quigley, who had deserted during the battle.

Pretorius now retreated to safety to the lands across the Vaal River with a bounty of £1000 announced for his capture while Henry Warden returned to Bloemfontein as the British Resident.

Due to limited financial and military resources available to British in the Orange River Sovereignty they struggled to maintain control of the boundaries in this territory and saw the possibility of the Boers being used to maintain the security of the remaining British colonies if latter controlled them. By 17 January 1852, the Sand River Convention was signed by William S. Hogge and C.M. Owen on behalf of the British and Andries Pretorius on behalf of the Voortrekkers that resulted in the creation of a Boer republic north of the Vaal River and the eventual South African Republic. Negotiations concerning the Orange River Sovereignty soon followed.

On the 23 February 1854, the Bloemfontein Convention was signed between the British government and Josias Hoffman and six former Voortrekkers that resulted in the British recognising the territory between the Vaal and Orange Rivers as an independent territory and would eventually become the Boer Orange Free State Republic.
