= Tjamuaha =

- Chief of the Herero people in South-West Africa
- Born: c. 1790; Otjikune
- Died: 1861; Okahandja
- Burial: Okahandja
- House: Ovaherero
- Father: Tjirwe

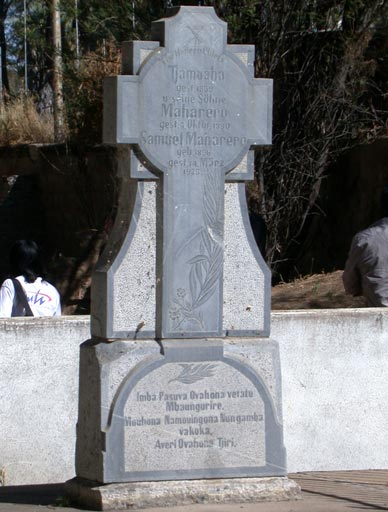
Tombstone for Tjamuaha, Maharero, and Samuel Maharero in Okahandja

Tjamuaha (also: Tjamuaha waTjirwe, literally English: Tjamuaha, son of Tjirwe, born ca. 1790 in Otjikune, died December 1861 in Okahandja) was a chief of the Herero people in South-West Africa, today's Namibia, and the father of Maharero. He was a close ally and subordinate of Jonker Afrikaner, Captain of the Oorlam Afrikaners, and stayed with him in Windhoek for most of his chieftaincy. With Tjamuaha's death, hostilities started between the Nama people and the Herero.

This made it necessary for the clans to unite as a group. That is how, on 15 June 1863 at Otjizingue (now Otjimbingwe), Maharero was elected as the commander-in-chief of all Herero clans. Later Maharero was elected the first Paramount Chief of the Herero people.

Preceded by Tjirwe	Paramount Chief of the Herero people 1842–1861	Succeeded by Maharero
