= Christian Afrikaner =

Captain of the Orlam

Christian Afrikaner (before 1820 – 15 June 1863) was the oldest son of Jonker Afrikaner and Beetje Boois. He became the fifth Captain of the mixed-race Orlam Afrikaners in South-West Africa, after the death of his father in 1861.

Christian was born at Bethanie, in what is now Namibia, at some time before 1820. He became leader of the Orlams while still in his twenties, at a time when his people were in constant conflict with the Herero over land and cattle but did not have the support of the European traders in Otjimbingwe, particularly Karl Johan Andersson and Frederick Green. They considered that the war was bad for trade, and helped organising and leading the Herero army. Consequently, the Herero were better equipped and gradually took over military dominance.

Christian Afrikaner died in an attack on Maharero's settlement at Otjimbingwe on 15 June 1863. This incident marked the beginning of the erosion of power of the Orlam Afrikaners.

== Bibliography ==
- Dictionary of South African Biography, Vol II. Pretoria: Human Sciences Research Council. 1972. ISBN 0-624-00369-8.
