= Dromica erikssoni =

Scientific classification
- Kingdom: Animalia
- Phylum: Arthropoda
- Class: Insecta
- Order: Coleoptera
- Suborder: Adephaga
- Family: Cicindelidae
- Genus: Dromica
- Species: D. erikssoni

Binomial name
- Dromica erikssoni (Péringuey, 1892)

Species of beetle

Dromica erikssoni is a beetle species from the family of tiger beetles (Cicindelidae). The scientific name of the species was first published in 1892 by Louis Péringuey.

The species was described from two specimens collected by Axel Eriksson in "northern Ovampoland" (now in Namibia).
