= Frederick Thomas Green =

- Born: 4 April 1829; Montreal, Upper Canada
- Died: 5 May 1876; Heigamkab, Damaraland
- Occupation(s): Hunter, trader, explorer
- Spouses: Betsy Kaipukire; Kate Stewardson

Frederick Thomas (Fred) Green (April 4, 1829 – May 5, 1876) was an explorer, hunter and trader in what is now Namibia and Botswana. From 1850 to 1853 he operated in the Lake Ngami area with his older brother Charles. After 1854 he was mainly based in Damaraland (Namibia).

== Biography ==
Frederick Thomas Green was born in Montreal, Quebec, the son of William John Green and his wife Margaret Gray. Margaret is the daughter of John Gray, the founder of the Bank of Montreal.

William John Green, also known as William Goodall Green, worked in the commissariat department of the British Army, and was transferred to Halifax, Nova Scotia in the 1840s, where his wife died. He then moved with his younger children to the Cape Colony in about 1846, and was stationed at Grahamstown.

=== Lake Ngami ===
Fred Green's older brother Henry Green was at Bloemfontein, in the Orange River Sovereignty in the commissariat department. Later he succeeded Major Warden as British Resident until the Sovereignty was abandoned in 1854. Fred and Charles Green were also in Bloemfontein at this time but set out on an expedition to Shoshong when Charles was aged 24 and Fred 21. On that trip they met David Livingstone and were at Livingstone's place at the Kolobeng Mission on 1850-07-30.

In 1851 the Green brothers went on another trip to Lake Ngami. This time they were accompanied by two army officers, Edward Shelley and Gervase Bushe. Bushe and Shelley had visited Bechuanaland the previous year, but had got lost. They were arrested by the Transvaal authorities, who were apparently trying to stop others from visiting Lake Ngami. On the 1851 trip they were more successful. They met David Livingstone and William Oswell at the Botletle River on 1851-09-11. There Livingstone helped them to repair a wagon wheel. Fred Green may have gone on ahead of the others and travelled as far as Ghanzi near the present border with Namibia.

By early March 1852, Fred Green was back in the Orange River Sovereignty, which seems to have become the base for him and his brother Charles on their annual expeditions. On their 1852 trip to Lake Ngami, Charles and Fred Green visited the Bakwena chief Setshele I at Kolobeng and left 50 cattle with him for their return journey. They were planning to travel in country infested by tsetse fly. At some point in their journey, they fell in with Samuel Edwards (son of a missionary), J.H. Wilson (Setshele's son-in-law) and Donald Campbell. They explored the north shore of Lake Ngami with Donald Campbell. They travelled about 120 miles west of the lake when they reached elephant country. This was also fly country and they lost 34 horses and 50 head of cattle.

On their return to Kolobeng they discovered that Boers had raided Kolobeng and made off with the cattle they had left with Setshele. Somee 200 women and nearly 1000 children were taken into slavery during the raid. Livingstone, likewise, returned to discover that his home had been plundered by the Boer raiders. Charles and Fred Green returned to Bloemfontein in January 1853 accompanied by Edwards, who acted as Setchele's interpreter, to lay a complaint with the British authorities in the person of their brother Henry Green, the British Resident. After deciding that a trip to Cape Town would not accomplish much. Charles Green held a collection for Setshele and apparently took him home again. Some sources say that Setchele actually got as far as Cape Town before returning home. Henry Green was warned in a letter by Sir George Cathcart, governor of the Cape Colony, not to listen to his brothers and espouse Setshele's cause.

Fred Green, then 23, remained in Bloemfontein, staying at Tempe with Andrew Hudson Bain, a Scots farmer who had hunted in the interior in his youth. Fred spent most of his time playing billiards and hunting with army officers. In the winter of 1853 Fred Green returned to the Lake Ngami area, travelling far to the east. In 1854 he travelled west through Damaraland to Walvis Bay. From there he went to Cape Town, presumably by sea. During the same period, the Orange River Sovereignty came to an end with the Bloemfontein Convention of 1854-02-23. In March, the British garrison and civil establishment left and the Orange Free State republic came into being. It seems likely that Fred Green thought that, in view of the changed political situation, the prospects for trade in the east were poor and so turned his face westwards.

In Cape Town Fred Green met Charles John Andersson, the Swede and entered into partnership with him. His next trip to Lake Ngami was sponsored by Andersson.

=== Marriage and children ===
Green first married Betsey Kaipukire ua Kandendu. They had a daughter, Ada Maria Green (1864-08-24 – 1926-05-24). He then married Kate Stewardson. They had seven children, four of whom died in infancy. Mary Elizabeth Green (1865-11-04 – 1952-04-18), Frederick Vincent Greene (1868-11-21 – 1949-11-26) and Alice Isabella Green (1871-08-16 – c1945) are the children that survived. Frederick Thomas Green is the great-grandfather of politician, academic, and author Mburumba Kerina (Kerina Otjiherero: green).

== Bibliography ==
- Schoeman, Karel (1988). The Bloemfontein diary of Lieut W.J. St John 1852-1853. Cape Town: Human & Rousseau. ISBN 0-7981-2243-9.
- Tabler, Edward (1973). Pioneers of South West Africa and Ngamiland. Cape Town: Balkema. ISBN 0-86961-021-X.
