= Orange River Convention =

Convention whereby the British formally recognised the independence of the Boers

Orange River Convention (1854)
- Type: Recognition of independence and self-government
- Signed: 23 February 1854
- Location: Bloemfontein, Orange River Sovereignty
- Expiration: 6 April 1872 (some parts earlier)
- Signatories: British government and representatives of the communities in the Orange River Sovereignty
- Language: English

Full text
- Orange River Convention (1854) at Wikisource

The Orange River Convention (sometimes also called the Bloemfontein Convention; Afrikaans: Bloemfontein-konvensie) was a convention whereby the British formally recognised the independence of the Boers in the area between the Orange and Vaal rivers, which had previously been known as the Orange River Sovereignty. This resulted in the formation of the independent Boer Republic of the Orange Free State (OFS).

== Lead-up to the convention ==
During the Great Trek the Boers moved out of the Cape Colony seeking autonomy from British control. However, the expanding interests of the British colonial government soon caught up with the Boers when they annexed Natal in 1845. After settling across the Orange River, relations between the Boers and different groups between the Orange River and the Caledon River were extremely strained; particularly between the Boers and the Basotho. Sir Harry Smith, the governor of the British Cape Colony at the time, decided to annex the area and set out clear boundaries. The land between the Vaal River and the Orange River was annexed on 3 February 1848 and was officially proclaimed as the Orange River Sovereignty. The Basotho lost a vast amount of land due to this annexation and the Boers were enraged by this process. Major Henry Douglas Warden was subsequently forced out of Bloemfontein in June 1848 by a Boer group led by Andries Pretorius. In August 1848, Sir Harry Smith arrived with his army and fought the Boers in the Battle of Boomplaats. The British came out victorious and one of the boundary lines created after this battle was called the Warden line. This line divided territory between the British and the Basotho and stretched from Cornetspruit and the Orange River through Vechtkop to Jammerbergdrift on the Caledon River. This action led to a conflict between the two groups where Moshoeshoe I defeated the British in a battle known as Battle of Viervoet in 1851. The British government retracted their decision for annexation, claiming it was too expensive and difficult to maintain. In addition, the Boers wanted independence and threatened to side with Moshoeshoe I in a war against the British. The Boers were asked to send a delegation to a meeting with the British special commissioner Sir George Clerk in August 1853. This meeting was aimed at establishing some form of self-governance in the Orange River Sovereignty. When they could not agree, the Boers sent two members of their original delegation to Britain to try to convince the government to alter their decision.

== Convention ==
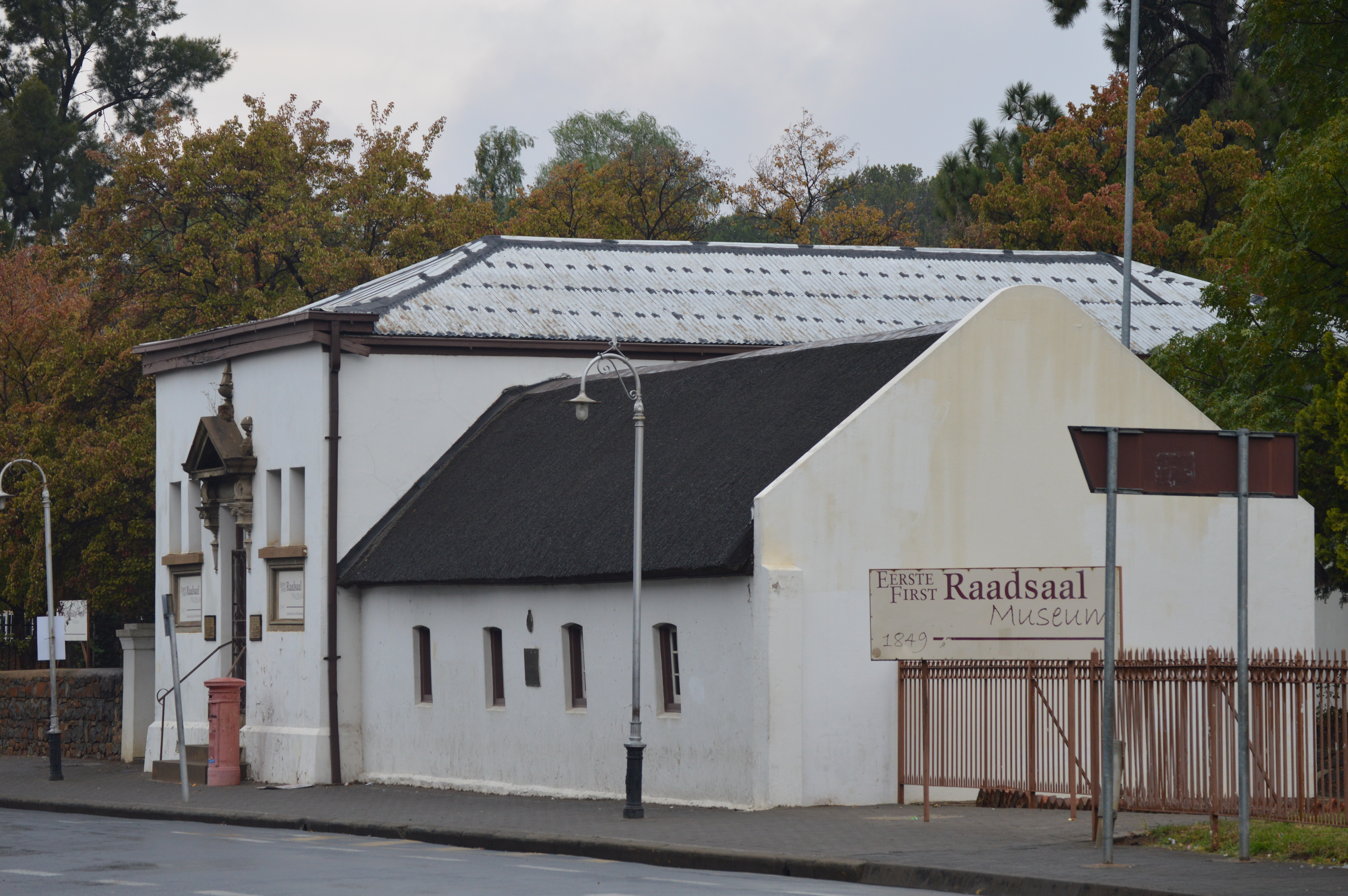
First Raadsaal where the Bloemfontein Convention was signed

On 30 January 1854, a royal proclamation was signed abandoning and renouncing all dominion in the Orange River Sovereignty. On 23 February 1854, the Orange River Convention officially recognised the independence of the area which was called the Orange Free State. The convention made no mention of Moshoeshoe I or what the boundaries between the Basotho and the Orange Free State would be. The convention was signed in a building now known as the First Raadsaal by Sir George Clerk, on behalf of the British government, and twenty-five representatives of the Boer people. The first two presidents of the Orange Free State Republic were later sworn into office in this building which later became a prominent symbol in Apartheid era education in South Africa.

For nearly 50 years following the convention the Boers had the right to govern themselves independently of the United Kingdom. It also temporarily halted the expansionist policies of Sir Harry Smith beyond the frontiers of the Cape Colony.

== Aftermath ==
By signing the convention, the British renounced control not only over the Boers but also over the Basotho and the Griqua. Earlier British treaties with African chiefdoms in the area were nullified and the Boers were permitted access to gunpowder and firearms while Africans were not. Both the Sand River Convention and the Orange River Convention included British recognition of Boer independence claims, and both claims were challenged during the first and second Boer Wars later in the 19th century.

== Sources ==
- Rosalie Schaffer, 'Succession to treaties: South African practice in the light of current developments in international law' (1981)
