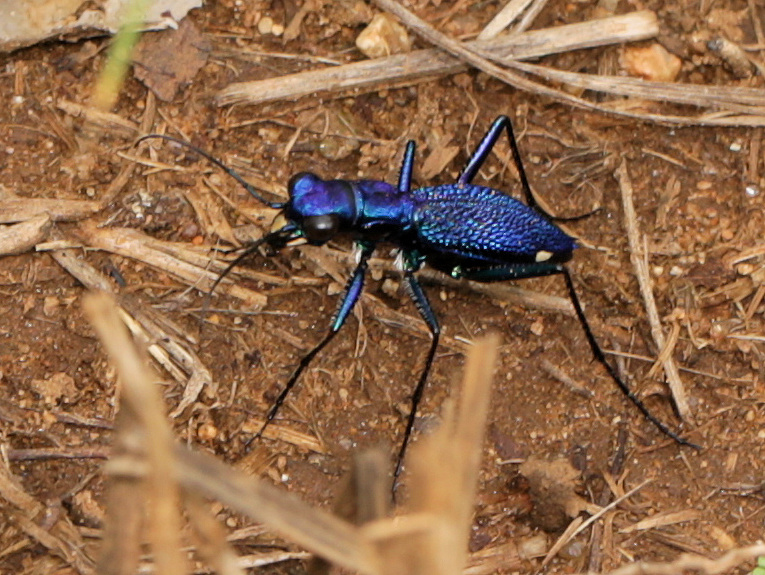
- Dromica kolbei, South Africa

Scientific classification
- Kingdom: Animalia
- Phylum: Arthropoda
- Class: Insecta
- Order: Coleoptera
- Suborder: Adephaga
- Superfamily: Caraboidea
- Family: Cicindelidae
- Genus: Dromica; Dejean, 1826

Subgenera
- Dromica Dejean, 1826; Foveodromica Cassola, 2003; Pseudodromica Cassola, 2003

= Dromica =

Genus of beetles

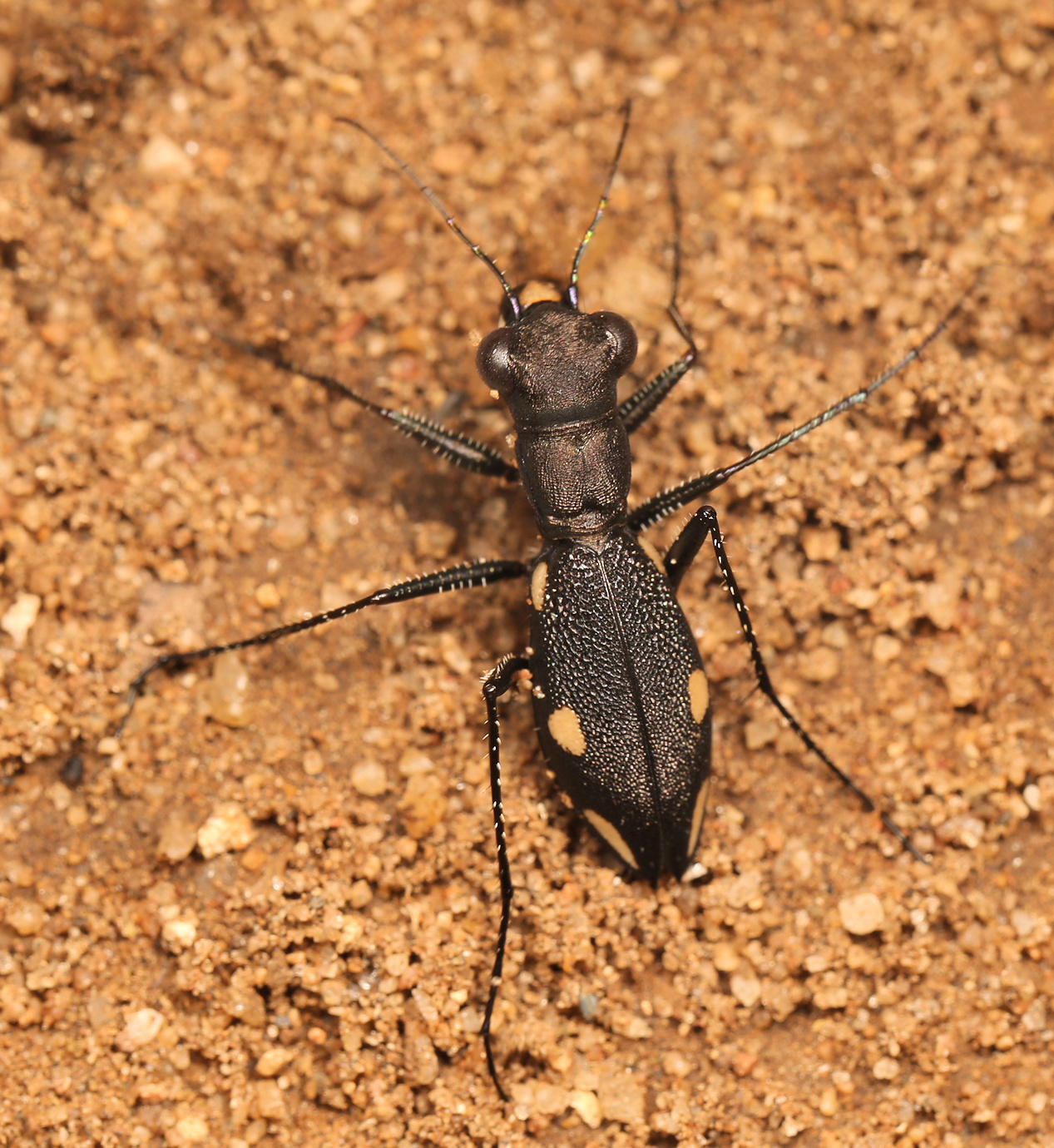
Dromica sexmaculata, South Africa

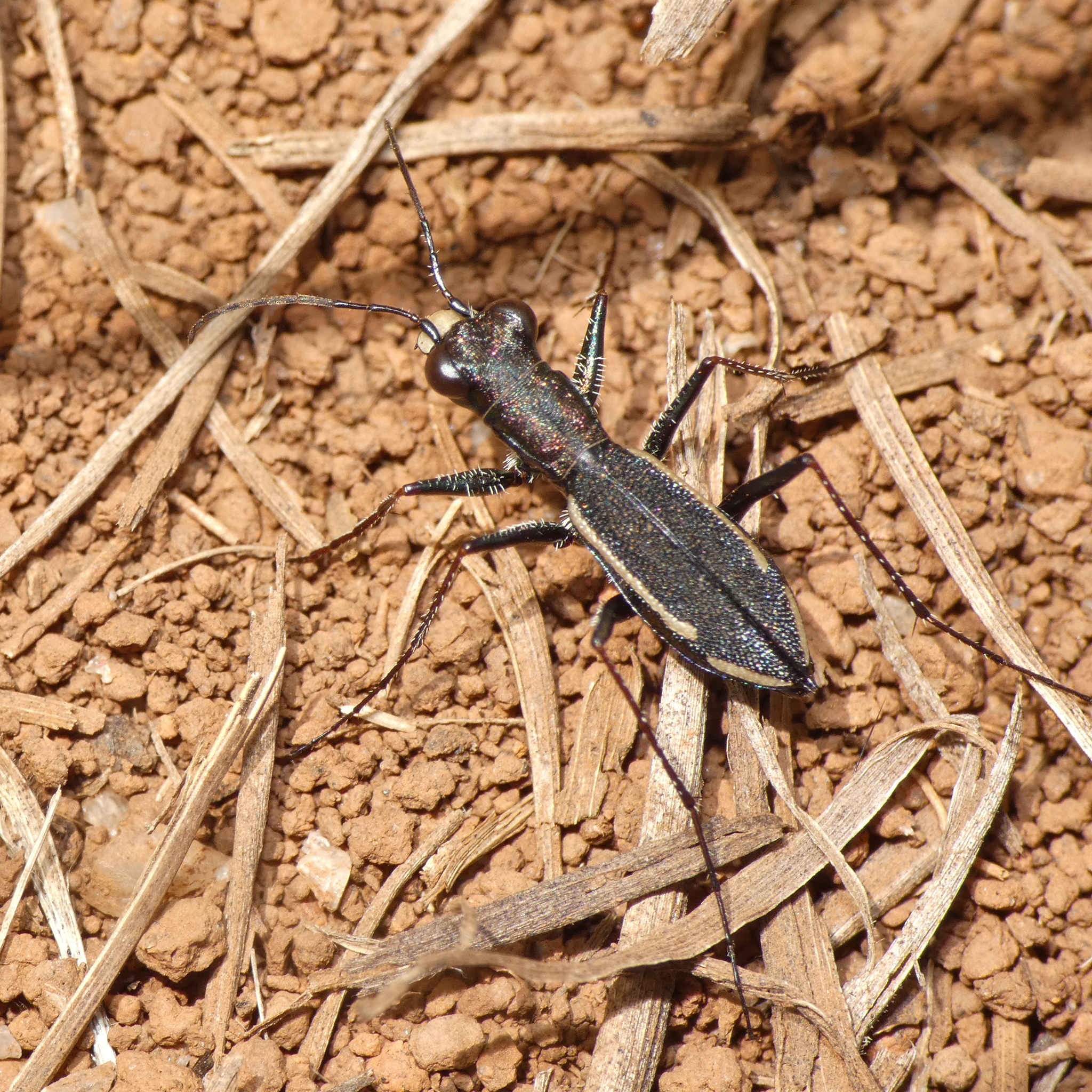
Dromica pseudocoarctata, Zimbabwe

Dromica is a genus in the beetle family Cicindelidae. There are at least 190 described species in Dromica, found in Africa.

== Species ==
These 190 species belong to the genus Dromica:

- Dromica abruptesculpta W.Horn, 1914
- Dromica abukari Cassola, 1989
- Dromica albicinctella Bates, 1878
- Dromica albivittis Chaudoir, 1865
- Dromica alboclavata Dokhtouroff, 1883
- Dromica allardi Basilewsky, 1963
- Dromica allardiana Basilewsky, 1972
- Dromica ambitiosa (Péringuey, 1892)
- Dromica angolana Cassola, 1980
- Dromica angusticollis (Péringuey, 1894)
- Dromica antoniae Werner, 1998
- Dromica apicalis W.Horn, 1903
- Dromica aspera Dokhtouroff, 1883
- Dromica auropunctata Quedenfeldt, 1883
- Dromica banlongari Lassalle, 2015
- Dromica batesi (W.Horn, 1900)
- Dromica bennigseni (W.Horn, 1896)
- Dromica bertinae C.A.Dohrn, 1891
- Dromica bertolonii (J.Thomson, 1856)
- Dromica bicostata W.Horn, 1914
- Dromica bicostulata W.Horn, 1914
- Dromica bilunata C.A.Dohrn, 1883
- Dromica borana Cassola, 1978
- Dromica bouyeri Schüle, 2011
- Dromica brzoskai Cassola, 2003
- Dromica cassolai Schüle, 2003
- Dromica citreoguttata Chaudoir, 1864
- Dromica clathrata Klug, 1834
- Dromica coarctata (Dejean, 1822)
- Dromica concinna Péringuey, 1904
- Dromica confluentesculpta W.Horn, 1913
- Dromica confusa Cassola, 1986
- Dromica connexa (Péringuey, 1892)
- Dromica consimilis Bertoloni, 1858
- Dromica convexicollis Péringuey, 1908
- Dromica cordicollis Chaudoir, 1865
- Dromica cosmemoides (W.Horn, 1914)
- Dromica costata (Péringuey, 1892)
- Dromica crassereducta W.Horn, 1909
- Dromica cristagalli (W.Horn, 1935)
- Dromica cupricollis W.Horn, 1913
- Dromica cupriscapularis Brouerius van Nidek, 1980
- Dromica densepunctata W.Horn, 1909
- Dromica differens Cassola, 1986
- Dromica discoidalis (W.Horn, 1897)
- Dromica dobbersteini Schüle & J.Moravec, 2002
- Dromica dolosa (Péringuey, 1894)
- Dromica egregia (Germar, 1843)
- Dromica elegantula (Boheman, 1848)
- Dromica elongatoplanata (W.Horn, 1922)
- Dromica endroedyi Schüle & Werner, 1999
- Dromica erikssoni (Péringuey, 1892)
- Dromica erlangeri W.Horn, 1904
- Dromica ertli W.Horn, 1903
- Dromica filicornis (W.Horn, 1898)
- Dromica flavovittata W.Horn, 1896
- Dromica formicaria Schüle, 2011
- Dromica formosa (Péringuey, 1894)
- Dromica fossulata Wallengren, 1881
- Dromica foveolata Péringuey, 1888
- Dromica fredericoi A.Serrano & Capela, 2015
- Dromica fundoplanata W.Horn, 1909
- Dromica furcata (Boheman, 1848)
- Dromica gibbicollis W.Horn, 1913
- Dromica gilvipes (Boheman, 1848)
- Dromica globicollis W.Horn, 1914
- Dromica gloriosa (Péringuey, 1896)
- Dromica gracilis W.Horn, 1909
- Dromica grandis Péringuey, 1892
- Dromica granulata Dokhtouroff, 1883
- Dromica grossula W.Horn, 1914
- Dromica grutii Chaudoir, 1865
- Dromica gunningi (Péringuey, 1898)
- Dromica hassoni Schüle & Monfort, 2017
- Dromica heinemanni Schüle, 2007
- Dromica helleri (W.Horn, 1897)
- Dromica hexasticta Fairmaire, 1887
- Dromica hildebrandti W.Horn, 1903
- Dromica honesta Schüle, 2003
- Dromica horii Cassola, 1986
- Dromica huilaensis Schüle, 2017
- Dromica humeralis W.Horn, 1913
- Dromica intermediopunctata W.Horn, 1929
- Dromica invicta (Péringuey, 1894)
- Dromica ipogoroensis Schüle & Werner, 2007
- Dromica jordani (W.Horn, 1899)
- Dromica juengeri Cassola, 1985
- Dromica junodi (Péringuey, 1892)
- Dromica kanzenzensis Cassola, 1986
- Dromica kavanaughi Cassola, 1980
- Dromica kenyana Werner, 1993
- Dromica kolbei (W.Horn, 1897)
- Dromica kudrnai Schüle, 2004
- Dromica lateralis (Boheman, 1860)
- Dromica laterodeclivis W.Horn, 1929
- Dromica laticollis W.Horn, 1903
- Dromica lepida (Boheman, 1848)
- Dromica lepidula W.Horn, 1903
- Dromica lerouxae (Cassola, 2003)
- Dromica leydenburgiana (Péringuey, 1898)
- Dromica limbata Bertoloni, 1858
- Dromica limpopoiana (Péringuey, 1892)
- Dromica lineata Schüle & Monfort, 2017
- Dromica lizleri Werner, 1996
- Dromica lunai Basilewsky, 1965
- Dromica maleci Schüle, 2011
- Dromica marginella (Boheman, 1848)
- Dromica marginepunctata (W.Horn, 1908)
- Dromica marshallana (W.Horn, 1901)
- Dromica marshalli (Péringuey, 1894)
- Dromica mauchii Bates, 1872
- Dromica mesothoracica W.Horn, 1909
- Dromica minutula Schüle, 2004
- Dromica mirabilis Cassola; Schüle & Werner, 2000
- Dromica miranda Péringuey, 1896
- Dromica monforti Schüle, 2017
- Dromica moraveci Werner, 1998
- Dromica muelleri Schüle, 2004
- Dromica murphyi Werner & Schüle, 2001
- Dromica neavei W.Horn, 1913
- Dromica neumanni (Kolbe, 1897)
- Dromica nicolae Monfort & Wiesner, 2007
- Dromica nigroplagiata (W.Horn, 1926)
- Dromica nobilitata (Gerstaecker, 1867)
- Dromica oberprieleri Cassola, 1986
- Dromica octocostata Chaudoir, 1864
- Dromica oesterlei Werner, 1993
- Dromica oneili W.Horn, 1925
- Dromica passosi Basilewsky, 1974
- Dromica paulae Cassola, 2003
- Dromica pentheri (W.Horn, 1899)
- Dromica peringueyi W.Horn, 1896
- Dromica pilosifrons W.Horn, 1925
- Dromica planifrons W.Horn, 1896
- Dromica polyhirmoides Bates, 1872
- Dromica praetermissa Schüle, 2011
- Dromica praticola Schüle, 2007
- Dromica proepipleuralis (W.Horn, 1926)
- Dromica profugorum Cassola & Miskell, 2001
- Dromica prolongata W.Horn, 1903
- Dromica prolongatesignata W.Horn, 1925
- Dromica pseudoclathrata Péringuey, 1892
- Dromica pseudocoarctata W.Horn, 1925
- Dromica pseudofurcata W.Horn, 1922
- Dromica pseudotenella Cassola, 2003
- Dromica punctatissima W.Horn, 1929
- Dromica pusilla Schüle, 2004
- Dromica quadricostata W.Horn, 1903
- Dromica quinquecostata W.Horn, 1892
- Dromica ramigera (Péringuey, 1892)
- Dromica rawlinsi Schüle & Werner, 2001
- Dromica saundersii Chaudoir, 1865
- Dromica schaumi (W.Horn, 1892)
- Dromica schuelei Cassola, 2003
- Dromica sculpturata Boheman, 1848
- Dromica semilevis W.Horn, 1897
- Dromica seriepunctata W.Horn, 1929
- Dromica serietuberculata W.Horn, 1929
- Dromica setosipennis W.Horn, 1914
- Dromica setosula W.Horn, 1909
- Dromica sexmaculata Chaudoir, 1861
- Dromica sigrunae Werner, 1998
- Dromica silvatica Schüle, 2017
- Dromica similis Cassola, 1980
- Dromica somalica Cassola, 1989
- Dromica soror (W.Horn, 1935)
- Dromica specialis Péringuey, 1904
- Dromica spectabilis (Péringuey, 1892)
- Dromica spinipennis W.Horn, 1929
- Dromica stalsi Cassola, 2003
- Dromica strandi W.Horn, 1914
- Dromica stutzeri W.Horn, 1913
- Dromica tarsalis (W.Horn, 1898)
- Dromica taruensis (Kolbe, 1897)
- Dromica tenella (Péringuey, 1892)
- Dromica tenellula W.Horn, 1903
- Dromica termitophila Schüle & Werner, 2001
- Dromica thomaswiesneri Wiesner, 2001
- Dromica traducens W.Horn, 1903
- Dromica transitoria (Péringuey, 1896)
- Dromica tricostata W.Horn, 1897
- Dromica tricostulata W.Horn, 1932
- Dromica trinotata Klug, 1834
- Dromica tuberculata Dejean, 1831
- Dromica variani Schüle, 2017
- Dromica variolata Chaudoir, 1865
- Dromica vittata Dejean, 1831
- Dromica wellmani (W.Horn, 1908)
- Dromica werneri Cassola & Schüle, 2002
- Dromica zambiensis Cassola, 2003
