= Dromica dobbersteini =

Scientific classification
- Domain: Eukaryota
- Kingdom: Animalia
- Phylum: Arthropoda
- Class: Insecta
- Order: Coleoptera
- Suborder: Adephaga
- Family: Cicindelidae
- Genus: Dromica
- Species: D. dobbersteini

Binomial name
- Dromica dobbersteini Schüle & Moravec, 2002

Species of beetle

Dromica dobbersteini is a species of tiger beetle, described by Schüle and Moravec in 2002. It is currently only known from Eswatini (Swaziland).
