= Dromica thomaswiesneri =

Scientific classification
- Kingdom: Animalia
- Phylum: Arthropoda
- Class: Insecta
- Order: Coleoptera
- Suborder: Adephaga
- Family: Cicindelidae
- Genus: Dromica
- Species: D. thomaswiesneri

Binomial name
- Dromica thomaswiesneri Wiesner, 2001

Species of beetle

Dromica thomaswiesneri is a tiger beetle, described by Wiesner in 2001. It is currently only known from Eswatini (Swaziland).
