= Henry Green (British resident) =

British Resident of the Orange River Sovereignty

- Born: 23 August 1818; Montreal, Quebec
- Died: 26 September 1884 (aged 66); Barkly West, Cape Colony
- Occupation(s): Civil servant, legislator, diamond digger
- Spouse: Ida Carolina von Lilienstein

Henry Green (August 23, 1818 – September 26, 1884) was British Resident of the Orange River Sovereignty, a civil servant and a diamond miner in Griqualand West.

Henry Green was born in Montreal, Quebec, Canada, the third son of William John Green and his wife Margaret Gray.

Like his father he entered the commissariat department of the British army, and he may have served in Canada before the family moved to the Cape Colony in the late 1840s. Green was in the commissariat department of the force under Captain H.D. Warden which took control of the area north of the Orange River that later became the Orange River Sovereignty.

Warden was appointed British Resident of the Orange River Sovereignty, and bought the farm Bloemfontein on which to establish the capital.

While Henry was there, three of his younger brothers joined him at various times. Charles and Fred Green used Bloemfontein as a base for their hunting expeditions around Lake Ngami, while Arthur Green, who later became a photographer, worked as a clerk in the commissariat department.

== Bibliography ==
- Schoeman, Karel (1988). The Bloemfontein diary of Lieut W.J. St John 1852-1853. Cape Town: Human & Rousseau. ISBN 0-7981-2243-9.
- Schoeman, Karel (1992). The British presence in the Transorange 1845-1854. Cape Town: Human & Rousseau. ISBN 0-7981-2965-4.

Preceded by Henry Douglas Warden	British Resident of the Orange River Sovereignty; 1852–1854	Succeeded by Josias Philip Hoffman
