= Henry Douglas Warden =

British colonial officer

Henry Douglas Warden (2 February 1800 – 2 December 1856) was a British Resident of the Orange River Sovereignty from 1846–1852. He went to the Cape in 1819 and was sent to Natal in 1842, where he participated in the siege of Congela. Four years later he was appointed magistrate of the Transoranje and bought the farm Bloemfontein where he and his family settled. The town later became the City of Bloemfontein.

== Biography ==
Henry Douglas Warden joined the military and was posted to South Africa where he lived life-long, became a prominent person in the South African history and the founder of the city Bloemfontein that became the judicial capital of South Africa, housing the Supreme Court of Appeal.

He joined the Cape Riflemen as ensign on 25 May 1820, promoted to Lieutenant on 15 September 1825. In 1826 Lieutenant Henry Douglas Warden was instructed to cross the Orange River. In 1835 he built Fort Warden at the Great Kei Way in 1835, 7 km south-east of the confluence of the Kei and the Komgha Rivers. After displaying extraordinary courage including in the sixth Frontier War he was promoted to Captain on 1 March 1839. [Cape Mounted Riflemen].

On 16 January 1846 Major Henry Douglas was appointed British Resident in Transoranje (the area north of the Orange River) This was in the territory of the Griqua captain Adam Kok in which he was to maintain law and order. He founded the town of Bloemfontein in 1846 on the farm Bloemfontein which he had bought from Dolf Britz at £37,10s. In 1848 Andries Pretorius forced Warden to leave Bloemfontein. But in the same year after the battle of Boomplaats he returned as British Resident of the Orange River Sovereignty, serving from 1848 to 1852.

Warden sold his farm Douglas Valley outside Bloemfontein after the Declaration of Independence of the Orange Free State in 1854. After his retirement he lived in the George district where he died at his residence of pneumonia on 2 Dec 1856 [Death Notice reference 1856 6/9/76 4196].

Major Henry Douglas Warden's death was reported as follows in the Grahamstown Journal: "Tuesday 9 December 1856 - DIED at his residence, Black Waters, District of George, on Tuesday the 2nd December 1856, Major Henry Douglas WARDEN, late British Resident Orange River Sovereignty, at the age of 56 years and 10 months, leaving a widow, nine children and a large circle of friends to deplore his loss."

Political offices
Preceded by William Sutton	British Resident of the Orange River Sovereignty; 1848–1852	Succeeded by Henry Green
