= Axel Wilhelm Eriksson =

Swedish ornithologist, settler and trader

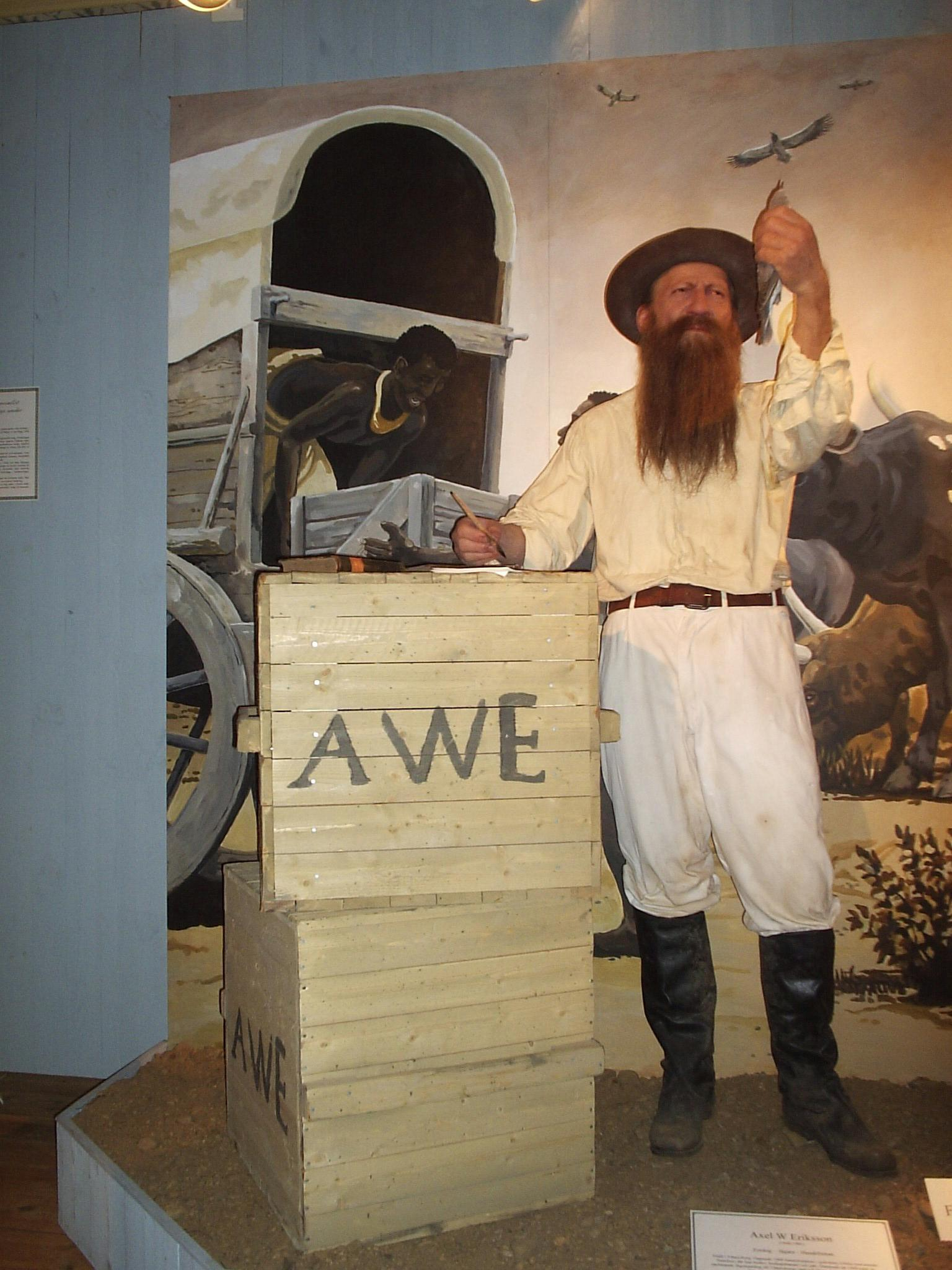
Axel Wilhelm Eriksson display at Vänersborg museum

Axel Wilhelm Eriksson (24 August 1846 – 5 May 1901) was a Swedish ornithologist, settler and trader in what is now Namibia. He was born in Vänersborg, in Sweden.

Eriksson went to South West Africa in 1866 (before Germany had established its colony of German South West Africa in 1884) to serve out a three-year apprenticeship to Charles John Andersson. In 1871, with Swede Anders Ohlsson, he established a brewery at Omaruru. Eriksson established a trading post there, which flourished and by 1878 employed about forty whites. Eriksson's business was based upon long-distance trading between southern Angola and Cape Colony, which necessitated the establishment of regional trade routes. He also built up an extensive bird collection, specimens coming from South West Africa, Angola and the Transvaal (now Gauteng Province in South Africa), the bulk of which has since been donated to the municipal museum in Vänersborg.

His activities gained much respect from a wide range of communities, including native and Boer, over a large geographic area. He was known to the Herero as Karuwapa Katiti ("the small white person").

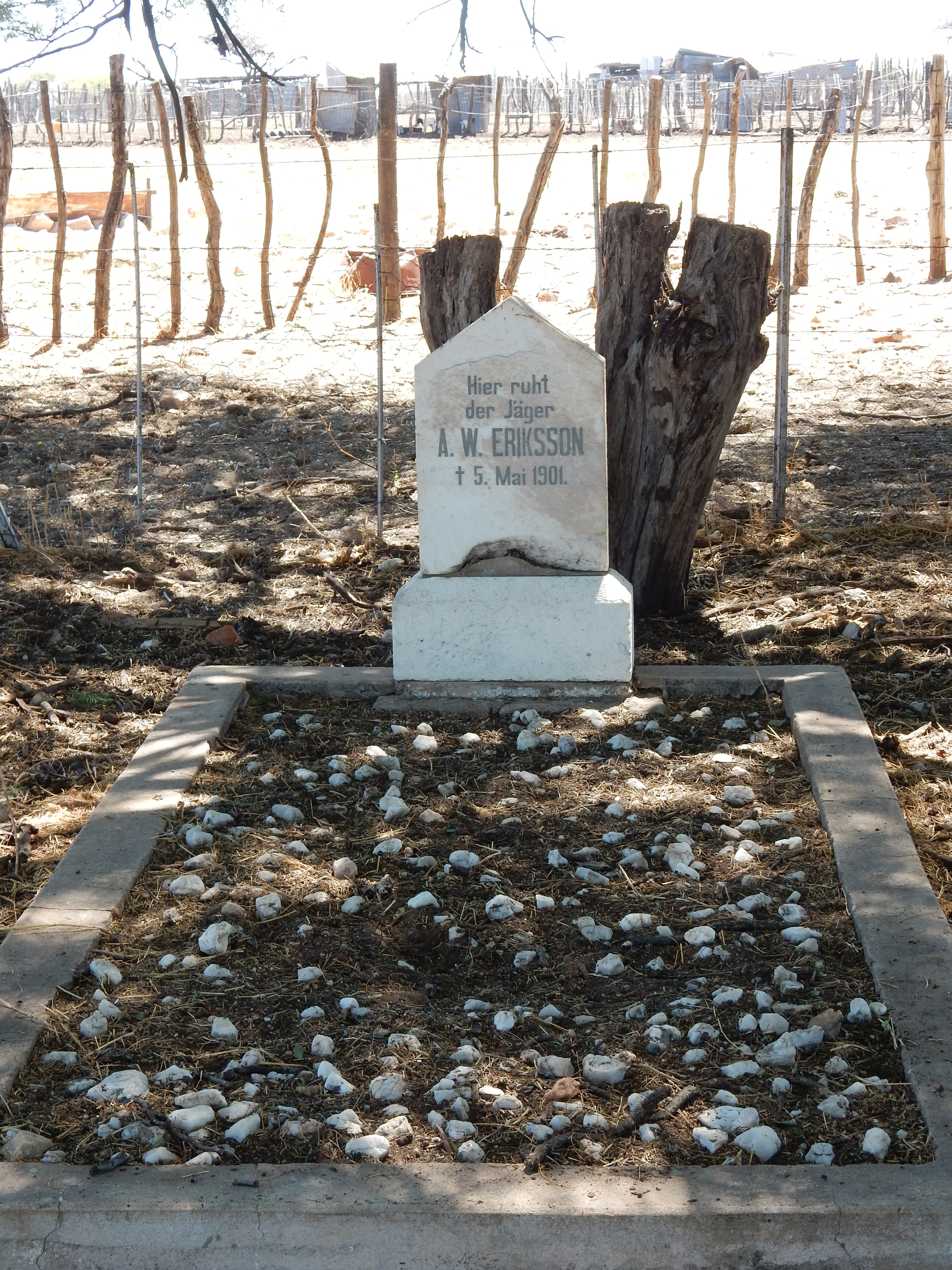
Axel Eriksson's grave

Axel Eriksson died on 5 May 1901 at farm Urupupa. It was said that "when Karuwapa died, the goodness in the country died as well". His grave near Rietfontein, thirty kilometres south west of Grootfontein, was made a national monument in 1978; a sign beside the grave reads: "This is the last resting place of Axel Eriksson, well known traveller, hunter, trader and pioneer, through whose intercession the Cape Government sent food to the distressed thirstland trekkers in 1879 thus rescuing various families from certain death". Despite the grave's status, the site is virtually inaccessible and is not maintained, with its boundary fence no longer intact (as at October 2014). However, in 2019 visits of the National Namibian Heritage Council took place and first steps to re-establish access and the National Heritage site had been taken. Due to the COVID-19 outbreak, a planned visit of a delegation of Swedish and Namibian government representatives and private Swedish interested parties had to be postponed to 2021.

Eriksson married Frances "Fanny" Stewardson, in 1871 and the couple had two sons, Axel Eriksson (1871-1924, died at Gaideb, Warmbad), a noted painter and Andrew Albert Eriksson (1876-1955) who became a priest in Sweden. There was also a daughter, Maud Alice Eriksson (who married in Cape Town and moved to England). Eriksson's two brothers, Carl and Gustav also migrated to South West Africa. Eriksson divorced Frances and subsequently married a Herero princess. The couple had a son, Jacob (born around 1884), who became a farmer in what is now Mozambique (his fate is not known).
