= Orange River Sovereignty =

Short-lived political entity in southern Africa (1846–1854)

- 1848–1854
- Flag

- Location of the Orange River Sovereignty, early 1850s
- Status: British colony
- Capital: Bloemfontein
- Common languages: Afrikaans; English; Sesotho; Setswana
- Religion: Dutch Reformed, African religions
- Government: Constitutional monarchy
- Queen
- Resident
  - 1848–1852: Henry Douglas Warden
  - 1852–1854: Henry Green
- Commissioners
  - 1849–1853: C. U. Stuart
  - 1853–1854: Sir George Russell Clerk
- History
  - British Colony founded: 3 February 1848
  - Dominion renounced: 30 January 1854
  - Bloemfontein Convention: 23 February 1854
  - British garrison departed: 11 March 1854
Succeeded by
Orange Free State

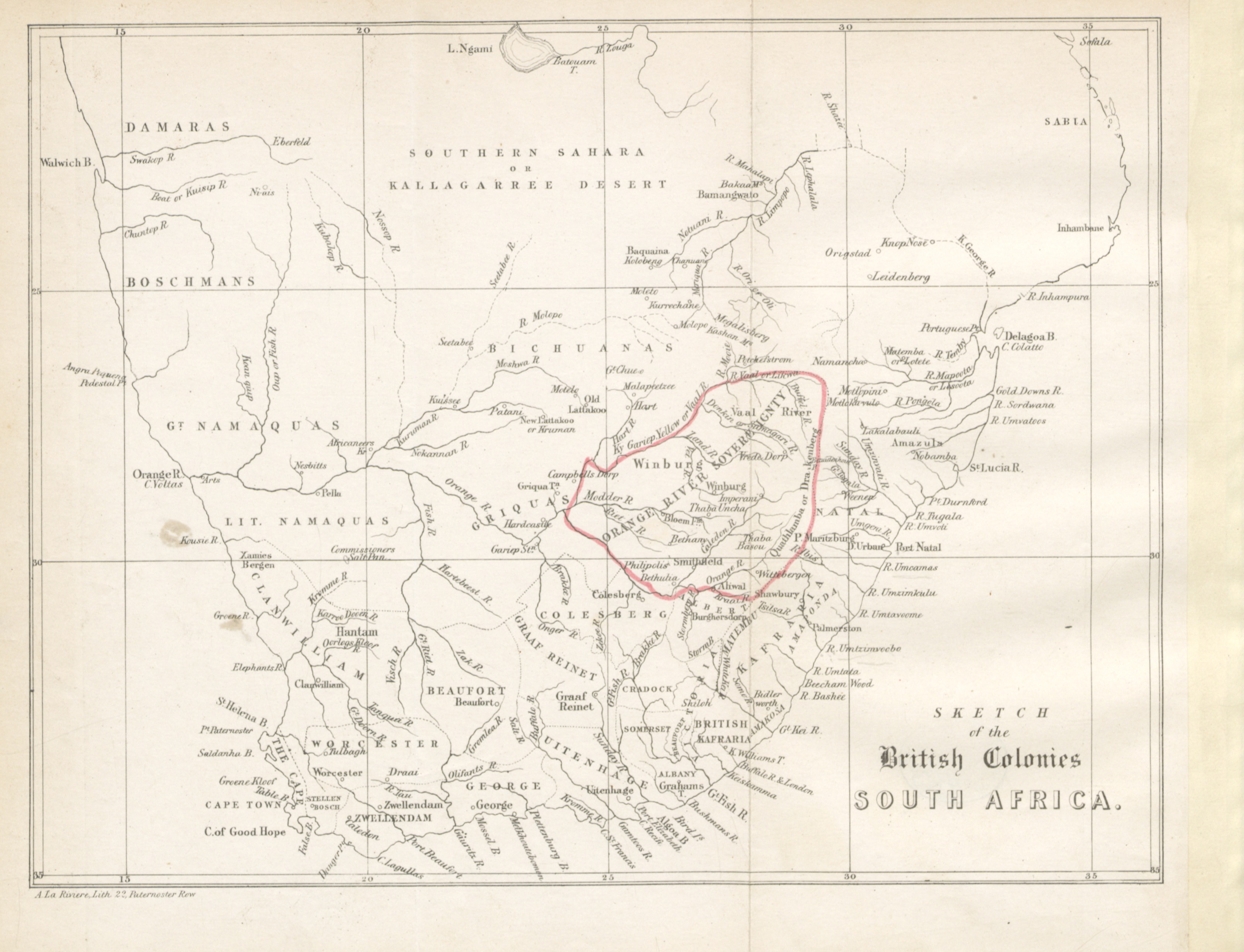
Map of southern Africa, 1855, with the Orange River Sovereignty circled

The Orange River Sovereignty (1848–1854; Afrikaans: Oranjerivier-soewereiniteit) was a short-lived political entity between the Orange and Vaal rivers in Southern Africa, a region known informally as Transorangia. In 1854, it became the Orange Free State, and is now the Free State province of South Africa.

== History ==
On 8 December 1845 Captain William Sutton was appointed "British Resident among the tribes living beyond the Frontier to the North-East" (relative to Cape Colony).

Sutton was succeeded as Resident on 16 January 1846 by Captain Henry Douglas Warden, who bought the farm Bloemfontein from a Griqua farmer to establish the capital. Warden was soon promoted to Major, and in March 1849 he was succeeded at Bloemfontein as civil commissioner by Mr C. U. Stuart, but he remained British resident until July 1852.

Sir Harry Smith proclaimed British sovereignty over Transorangia on 3 February 1848. A nominated legislative council was created, a high court established and other steps taken for the orderly government of the country, which was officially styled the Orange River Sovereignty. In October 1849 King Moshoeshoe I was induced to sign a new arrangement considerably curtailing the boundaries of the Basuto reserve. The frontier towards the Sovereignty was thereafter known as the Warden line. A little later the reserves of other chieftains were precisely defined.

The British Resident had, however, no force sufficient to maintain his authority, and Moshoeshoe and all the neighbouring clans became involved in hostilities with one another and with the Europeans. In 1851 Moshoeshoe joined the republican party in the Sovereignty in an invitation to Andries Pretorius to recross the Vaal. The intervention of Pretorius resulted in the Sand River Convention of 1852, which acknowledged the independence of the Transvaal but left the status of the Sovereignty untouched.

The British government (under the first Russell administration), which had reluctantly agreed to the annexation of the country, had, however, already repented its decision and had resolved to abandon the Sovereignty. Earl Grey, Secretary of State for War and the Colonies, in a dispatch to Sir Harry Smith dated 21 October 1851, declared: “The ultimate abandonment of the Orange Sovereignty should be a settled point in our policy.” A meeting of representatives of all European inhabitants of the Sovereignty, elected on manhood suffrage, held at Bloemfontein in June 1852, nevertheless declared in favour of the retention of British rule.

Henry Green was appointed British Resident on 3 July 1852 in place of Warden, who had been dismissed. At the close of that year a settlement was at length concluded with Moshoeshoe, which perhaps left that chief in a stronger position than he had hitherto been. There had been ministerial changes in England and the Aberdeen ministry, then in power, adhered to the determination to withdraw from the Sovereignty. Sir George Russell Clerk was sent out in 1853 as special commissioner "for the settling and adjusting of the affairs" of the Sovereignty, and in August of that year he summoned a meeting of delegates to determine upon a form of self-government.

At that time there were some 15,000 Europeans in the country, many of them recent immigrants from Cape Colony. There were among them numbers of farmers and tradesmen of British descent. The majority of the whites still wished for the continuance of British rule provided that it was effective and the country guarded against its enemies. The representations of their delegates, who drew up a proposed constitution retaining British control, were unavailing. Sir George Clerk announced that, as the elected delegates were unwilling to take steps to form an independent government, he would enter into negotiations with other persons. "And then," wrote George McCall Theal, "was seen the strange spectacle of an English commissioner of high rank and courteous demeanour addressing men who wished to be free of British control as the friendly and well-disposed inhabitants, while for those who desired to remain British subjects and who claimed that protection to which they believed themselves entitled, he had no sympathising word." While the elected delegates sent two members to England to try to induce the government to alter their decision, Sir George Clerk speedily came to terms with a committee formed by the republican party and presided over by Mr J P Hoffman. Even before this committee met, a royal proclamation had been signed (30 January 1854) "abandoning and renouncing all dominion" in the Sovereignty.

The Orange River Convention, recognising the independence of the country, was signed at Bloemfontein on 23 February 1854 by Sir George Clerk and the republican committee, and in March the Boer government assumed office. Five days later the representatives of the elected delegates had an interview in London with the colonial secretary, the Duke of Newcastle, who informed them that it was now too late to discuss the question of the retention of British rule. The colonial secretary added that it was impossible for England to supply troops to constantly advancing outposts, "especially as Cape Town and the port of Table Bay were all she really required in South Africa". In withdrawing from the Sovereignty the British government declared that it had "no alliance with any native chief or tribes to the northward of the Orange River with the exception of the Griqua chief Captain Adam Kok [III]". Kok was not formidable in a military sense, nor could he prevent individual Griquas from alienating their lands. Eventually, in 1861, he sold his sovereign rights to the Free State for £4,000 and moved with his followers to the northern part of the Mpondo king Faku's No Man's Land, later called Griqualand East.
