= Jonker Afrikaner =

Captain of the Orlam Afrikaners (1785–1861)

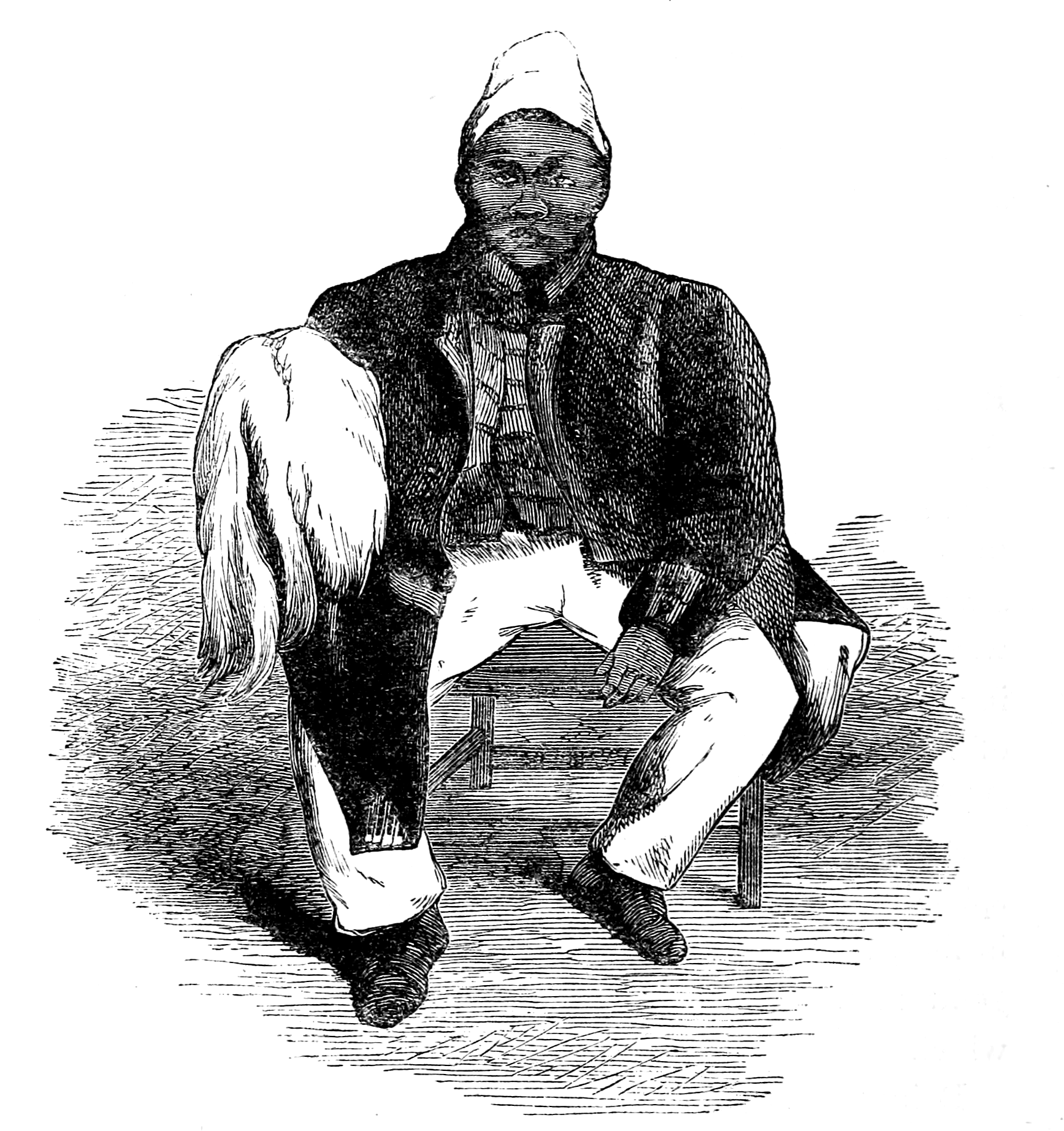
- Jonker Afrikaner, engraving

Captain of the Orlam Afrikaners
- Reign: 1823–1861
- Predecessor: Jager Afrikaner
- Successor: Christian Afrikaner
- Born: 3 February 1785; Near Tulbagh, Dutch Cape Colony
- Died: 18 August 1861 (aged 76); Okahandja

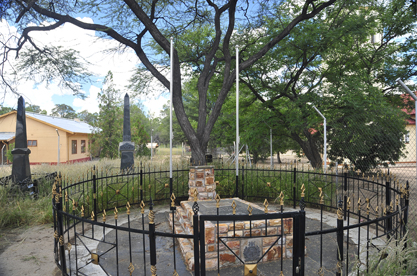
Grave of Jonker Afrikaner in Okahandja (2014)

Jonker Afrikaner (3 February 1785 – 18 August 1861) was the fourth Captain of the Orlam in what is today Namibia, succeeding his father, Jager Afrikaner, in 1823. Soon after becoming Captain, he left his father's settlement at Blydeverwacht with three brothers and some 300 followers and relocated to the area that is today central Namibia. From 1825 onwards he and his council played a dominant political role in Damaraland and Namaland, creating a de facto state.

Around 1840, he established a settlement at Windhoek where he built a church for a congregation of between 500 and 600 in the area of the present-day Klein Windhoek suburb. Jonker Afrikaner introduced the name "Windhoek" for the settlement. It is not known whether it was inspired by his birth place, farm Winterhoek near Tulbagh, South Africa, the Winterhoek mountains after which the farm was named, or simply the weather conditions in the new settlement (Windhoek in Afrikaans means windy corner).

Jonker Afrikaner oversaw the development of the road network in central and southern South West Africa, first the one over the Auas Mountains to the south. Hugo Hahn and Franz Heinrich Kleinschmidt, missionaries with the Rhenish Missionary Society who arrived in Windhoek in 1842 at Jonker Afrikaner's invitation, initiated the creation of a path from Windhoek to Barmen via Okahandja, and in 1850 this road, later known as Alter Baiweg (Old Bay Path), was extended via Otjimbingwe to Walvis Bay. This route served as an important trade connection between the coast and Windhoek until the end of the century.

Missionary Hahn estimated in 1852 that Jonker Afrikaner's state ruled over 1,500 ethnic Oorlams, 2,000 Hereros, and 2,000 Damaras.

He was the father of Christian Afrikaner who succeeded him as chief of the Orlams in 1861, and Jan Jonker Afrikaner who succeeded Christian in 1863.
