= Charles John Andersson =

Swedish explorer and hunter (1827–1867)

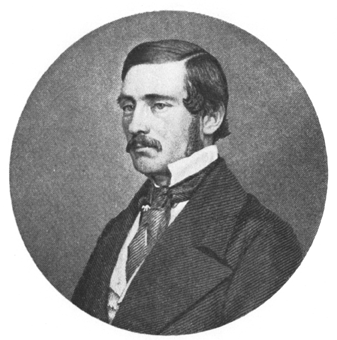
- Born: 4 March 1827; Värmland, Sweden
- Died: 9 July 1867 (aged 40); Portuguese Angola
- Occupations: Trader; hunter; explorer

Charles John (Karl Johan) Andersson (4 March 1827 – 9 July 1867) was a Swedish explorer, hunter and trader as well as an amateur naturalist and ornithologist.

He is most famous for the many books he published about his travels, and for being one of the most notable explorers of southern Africa, mostly in present-day Namibia.

== Biography ==
=== Early life ===
Karl Johan Andersson was born on 4 March 1827 in Värmland in Sweden. He was the child of the British bear hunter Llewellyn Lloyd and Kasja Andersdotter from Sweden

Andersson grew up in Sweden. Early in his life he went on hunting expeditions with his father, experienced Swedish nature and started a collection of biology specimens.

In 1847, he started studies at the University of Lund and was there for a year before a brief stint as a professional hunter.

=== Explorations ===
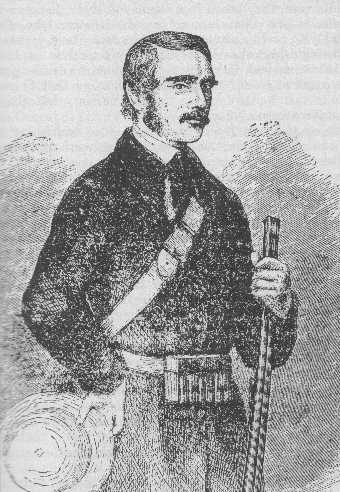
Charles John Andersson.

In 1849, he departed for London, intending to sell his collection to raise money for travels around the world. In London he met with the explorer Francis Galton, with whom he organised an expedition to Southern Africa. On midsummer day in 1850 they arrived at the Cape of Good Hope and then travelled to Walvis Bay, in modern-day Namibia. They then trekked into the interior, at the time little explored by Europeans. They intended to reach Lake Ngami, but failed on that expedition.

Galton returned home to England, while Andersson stayed in the area and reached Lake Ngami in 1853. In 1855 he returned to London, where he published his book "Lake Ngami", in which he describes his travels. He returned to Africa the same year.

Back in south west Africa, Andersson was hired as manager for mines in what was then called Damaraland and Namaqualand. However, he only held the position for a brief time, and continued his explorations. In 1859 he reached the Okavango River, an expedition that he recorded in his book The Okavango River.

After his return, he travelled to the Cape, where he married. Andersson and his wife settled in Otjimbingwe (in modern central Namibia).

Andersson had repeated financial problems. Even though his main interests were exploration and natural history, he often needed to earn money through trade and hunting. He lacked the money needed to publish his books and Galton declined to lend him any.

=== Death ===
In 1867, despite serious illness, Andersson travelled north towards the Portuguese settlements in modern Angola, in order to establish a better trading route to Europe. He was unable to cross the Cunene River, so he had to turn back. His condition had worsened during his journey to the Cunene and, on the return journey, he died on 9 July 1867. He was buried by another Swede, Axel Eriksson.

After his death, Andersson's wife and children continued to live in Africa, in the Cape Colony.

His father published notes from some of his expeditions in the book "Notes of Travel in South-Western Africa".

== Bibliography ==
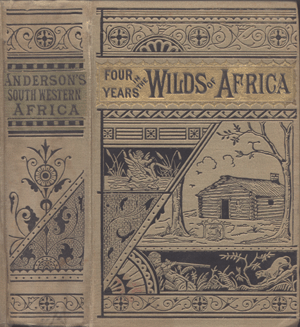
Cover of the American edition of one of Anderssons books. Note that his name is misspelled - there should be two "s".

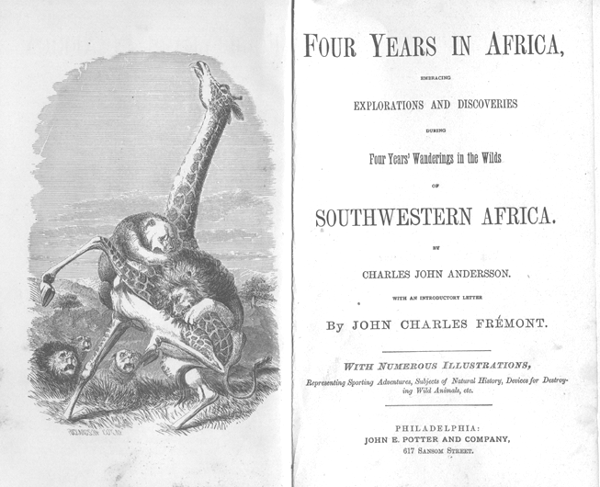
Title page of the same book as above.

=== Publications by Andersson ===
- Andersson, Charles John (1855). "Explorations in South Africa, with the Route from Walfisch Bay to Lake Ngami". Journal of the Royal Geographical Society. 25 (25): 79–107. doi:10.2307/1798105. JSTOR 1798105.
- Andersson, Charles John (1856). Lake Ngami, or Explorations and Discoveries in the Wilds of Southern Africa. New York.
- Andersson, Charles John (1861). The Okavango River, a Narrative of Travel, Exploration and Adventure. London.
- Andersson, Charles John (1873). The Lion and The Elephant. London.
- Andersson, Charles John (1875). Notes of Travel in South-Western Africa (PDF). New York.

=== Published letters and correspondence ===
- Andersson, Charles John. (1987) The Matchless Copper Mine in 1857: Correspondence of Manager C. J. Andersson, edited by Brigitte Lau. Windhoek: National Archives, Namibia.
- Andersson, Charles John. (1989) Trade and Politics in Central Namibia 1860–1864: Diaries and Correspondence. Windhoek: Archives Services Division, Dept. of National Education.

=== Publications about Andersson ===
- Wallis, J.P.R. (1936). Fortune my Foe: The Story of Charles John Andersson, African Explorer 1827–1867. London.
- Bjelfvenstam, Bo (1994). Charles John Andersson: Upptäckare, jägare, krigare Explorer 1827–1867 (in Swedish). Stockholm: Carlsson. ISBN 91-7798-898-1.
- Pettersson, Christer L (2008). In the footsteps of Mr Andersson - milestones in Swedish-Namibia relations. Johannesburg: David Krut Publishing. ISBN 9780981404295.

== See also ==
- Vega expedition

== Sources ==
- Bederman, Sanford H. (2007). "Andersson, Karl Johan". In Buiisseret, David (ed.). The Oxford Companion to World Exploration. Oxford University Press. pp. 44–45. ISBN 978-0-19-514922-7.
- "Charles Andersson".
- "Andersson, Charles John". Nordisk Familjebok. Vol. 1 (1st ed.). 1876. pp. 716–717.
