= Otjimbingwe =

Otjimbingwe Otjizingue
- Settlement
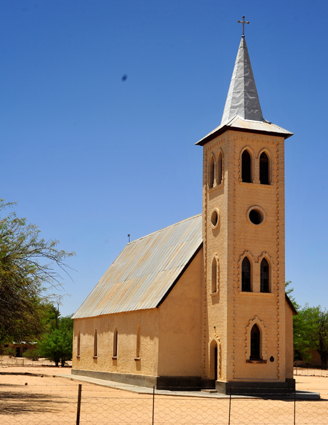
- Rhenish Missionary Church in Otjimbingwe

- Location in Namibia
- Coordinates: 22°21′27″S 16°7′43″E
- Country: Namibia
- Region: Erongo Region

Population (2016)
  - Total: 8,000
- Time zone: UTC+2 (South African Standard Time)

Otjimbingwe (also: Otjimbingue) is a settlement in the Erongo Region of central Namibia. Otjimbingwe has approximately 8,000 inhabitants and belongs to the Karibib electoral constituency.

Otjimbingwe was an important settlement in South West Africa. In the 1860s, the Herero people, facing an imminent attack from the Nama people, united here and elected Maharero first their military commander, and later their first paramount chief. Situated on the Old Bay Road, an ox wagon track leading from Windhoek to Walvis Bay, the settlement was also an economic and cultural centre. Karl Johan Andersson had his trading headquarters here, the Augustineum seminary was situated in town, and it hosted the headquarters of the Rhenish Mission Society. When the territory became the German colony of German South West Africa, Otjimbingwe was the de facto capital.

At the end of the 19th century, the settlement began to lose its importance. The Augustineum was relocated to Okahandja, the German administration moved to Windhoek, and the railway between Swakopmund and Windhoek, built in 1900, bypassed Otjimbingwe.

== Geography ==
Otjimbingwe is situated south of Karibib on the junction of Omusema and the Swakop River. It had approximately 8,000 inhabitants in 2016.

== History ==
Otjimbingwe is the Ovaherero name of the Khoekhoegowab word 'Atsas', which means to try to drink. The Damara people were already present in the area before the Herero people migrated to Otjimbingwe (Atsas). The present-day make up of Otjimbingwe shows more Damaras or Khoekhoe speakers than Hereros. The area had already been a settlement of the Damaras before the Herero migration in the early 18th century.

The Old Bay Road, built by Jonker Afrikaner in the 1840s, led through Otjimbingwe, making the settlement an economic and cultural hub. The Rhenish Mission Society subsequently used Otjimbingwe as a central location for their Namibian mission in 1849. Johannes Rath and his family settled in the area on 11 July that year.

In 1854, copper was found in the nearby Khomas highlands and the Walwich Bay Mining Company established its offices in the city. Miners and merchants flocked to the settlement, and the researcher and businessman Karl Johan Andersson bought the entire settlement in 1860. He sold it five years later to the Rhenish Missionary Society. However the copper supply had been exhausted by that time, and the mining operations ceded.

The settlement was attacked and plundered several times in its early history. In 1863 the Battle of Otjimbinge took place, one of the largest battles of the Herero-Nama War. Andersson and the Herero fought the Oorlam people under Christian Afrikaner.

Rhenish missionary Carl Hugo Hahn founded the Augustineum, a seminary and teacher training college, in 1866. It remained in Otjimbingwe until 1890 and was then moved to Okahandja. Hahn also founded the first school of South West Africa at Otjimbingwe in 1876. Under the control of Commissioner Dr. Heinrich Ernst Göring, the place became the seat of the colonial administration, the de facto capital, in the late 1880s. On 16 July 1888, German South West Africa's first post office opened in town. However, control gradually shifted to Windhoek, and the civil administration moved there in 1892. The railway line from Windhoek and Swakopmund was completed in the early 1900s, bypassing Otjimbingwe, and the city greatly declined in size thereafter.

== People ==
Otjimbingwe is a centre of Herero tradition and culture. In the 19th century, it was the seat of the Zeraua royal house and hosted several important meetings of the OvaHerero community. On 15 June 1863, in the wake of the Herero-Nama War, most of the Herero communities sent representatives to unify the Herero for the war, while King Zeraua sent a delegation to the port of Walvis Bay to acquire weapons. In 1867, the Herero people agreed to establish the position for a paramount chief, which has been in place since then. Herero paramount chieftain elections still take place at Otjimbingwe, hosted by the Ovaherero Traditional Authority.

== Historic buildings ==
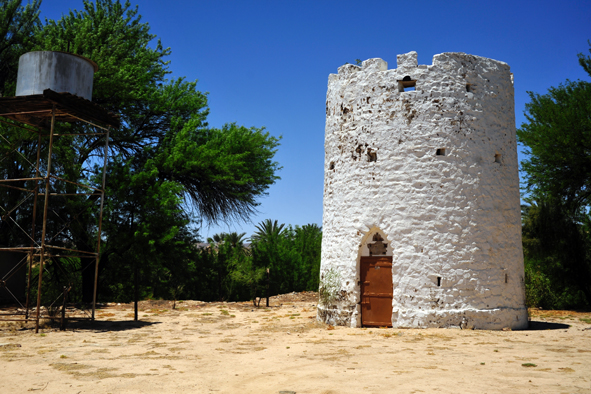
Powder Tower in Otjimbingwe, built by the inhabitants in 1870 as a fortified tower

The Rhenish church in the settlement's centre is one of the settlement's main attractions. Constructed in 1867 and proclaimed a National Monument in 1974, it is one of Namibia's oldest churches. Another proclaimed National Monument is the Pulverturm (armory tower), erected in 1870.

== Education ==
Da-Palm Senior Secondary School, is situated in the settlement on the banks of the Swakop River.

Otjimbingwe used to be a centre for theological education. It was home to the

- Augustineum (1866–1890), a seminary and teacher training college
- United Lutheran Theological Seminary – Paulinum (1963–1997), for students from the Evangelical Lutheran Church in the Republic of Namibia (ELCRN) and the Evangelical Lutheran Church in Namibia (ELCIN)

== Natural history ==
The type specimens of the scorpion species Uroplectes otjimbinguensis were collected near Otjimbingwe, and the species was named after the town.
