= List of slums in Namibia =

The official name for slums in Namibia is informal settlements. Colloquial names include location, shanty town, township, and ghetto. In 2018 there were 308 urban slums all over Namibia with close to 1 million inhabitants, about 40% of the population.

- Windhoek
  - Goreangab, near Goreangab Dam
  - Greenwell Matongo
  - Hakahana
  - Havana
  - Katutura
  - Mix camp
  - Okahandja Park Infomal Settlement
  - Okuryangava
  - Otjomuise
- Katima Mulilo
  - Choto
- Okahandja
  - Vyf Rand
- Swakopmund
  - Mondesa
    - Democratic Resettlement Community
- Walvis Bay
  - Kuisebmond

== See also ==
- List of slums
