= Herero and Nama genocide reparations =

In 2015, the German government acknowledged that a genocide had been committed against the Herero and Nama peoples in what is now Namibia. Negotiations between the German and Namibian governments led to a deal in 2021 in which the German government agreed to contribute 1.1 billion euros in the form of ex gratia development aid, while rejecting any legal responsibility for the genocide. The deal was not widely acceptable to the descendants of the genocide's victims, who felt that they should have been able to negotiate with Germany directly. Although favorably contrasting the deal with more limited British and Dutch efforts at confronting past colonial crimes, German sociologist Henning Melber opines that "Germany has fallen short of bearing full and unconditional responsibility for and recognition of the crime in terms of restorative justice." International law expert Matthias Goldmann suggested that the deal may not have been as selfless as it initially appears, while it "seemingly confirms [Germany's] civilizational superiority".

== Recognition ==
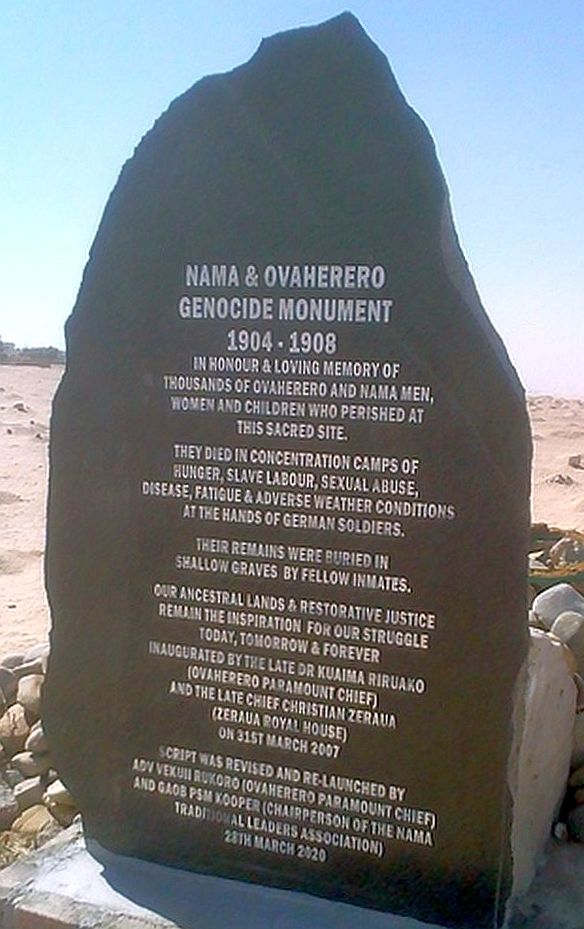
Memorial in Swakopmund (2020)

In 1998, German President Roman Herzog visited Namibia and met Herero leaders. Chief Munjuku Nguvauva demanded a public apology and compensation. Herzog expressed regret but stopped short of an apology. He pointed out that international law requiring reparation did not exist in 1907, but he undertook to take the Herero petition back to the German government.

On 16 August 2004, at the 100th anniversary of the start of the genocide, a member of the German government, Heidemarie Wieczorek-Zeul, Germany's Federal Minister for Economic Development and Cooperation, officially apologised and expressed grief about the genocide, declaring in a speech that:

We Germans accept our historical and moral responsibility and the guilt incurred by Germans at that time.

She ruled out paying special compensations, but promised continued economic aid for Namibia which in 2004 amounted to $14M a year. This number has been significantly increased since then, with the budget for the years 2016–17 allocating a sum total of €138M in monetary support payments.

The Trotha family travelled to Omaruru in October 2007 by invitation of the royal Herero chiefs and publicly apologised for the actions of their relative. Wolf-Thilo von Trotha said:

We, the von Trotha family, are deeply ashamed of the terrible events that took place 100 years ago. Human rights were grossly abused that time.

Beginning in 2025, Namibia has marked 28 May, the date when the Germans closed their concentration camps in 1907 following international criticism, as Genocide Remembrance Day.

== Negotiations and agreement ==
The Herero filed a lawsuit in the United States in 2001 demanding reparations from the German government and Deutsche Bank, which financed the German government and companies in Southern Africa. With a complaint filed with the United States District Court for the Southern District of New York in January 2017, descendants of the Herero and Nama people sued Germany for damages in the United States. The plaintiffs sued under the Alien Tort Statute, a 1789 U.S. law often invoked in human rights cases. Their proposed class-action lawsuit sought unspecified sums for thousands of descendants of the victims, for the "incalculable damages" that were caused. Germany seeks to rely on its state immunity as implemented in US law as the Foreign Sovereign Immunities Act, arguing that, as a sovereign nation, it cannot be sued in US courts in relation to its acts outside the United States. In March 2019, the judge dismissed the claims due to the exceptions to sovereign immunity being too narrow for the case.

In September 2020, the Second Circuit stated that the claimants did not prove that money used to buy property in New York could be traced back to wealth resulting from the seized property and therefore the lawsuit could not overcome Germany's immunity. In June 2021, the Supreme Court declined to hear a petition to revive the case.

Germany, while admitting brutality in Namibia, at first refused to call it a "genocide", claiming that the term only became international law in 1945. However, in July 2015, then foreign minister Frank-Walter Steinmeier issued a political guideline stating that the massacre should be referred to as a "war crime and a genocide". Bundestag president Norbert Lammert wrote an article in Die Zeit that same month referring to the events as a genocide. These events paved the way for negotiations with Namibia.

In 2015, the German government began negotiations with Namibia over a possible apology, and by 2016, Germany committed itself to apologizing for the genocide, as well as to refer to the event as a genocide; but the actual declaration was postponed while negotiations stalled over questions of compensation.

On 11 August 2020, following negotiations over a potential compensation agreement between Germany and Namibia, President Hage Geingob of Namibia stated that the German government's offer was "not acceptable", while German envoy Ruprecht Polenz said he was "still optimistic that a solution can be found".

On 28 May 2021, the German government announced that it was formally recognizing the atrocities committed as a genocide, following five years of negotiations. The declaration was made by foreign minister Heiko Maas, who also stated that Germany was asking Namibia and the descendants of the genocide victims for forgiveness. In addition to recognizing the events as a genocide, Germany agreed to give as a "gesture of recognition of the immeasurable suffering" €1.1 billion in aid to the communities impacted by the genocide.

Following the announcement, the agreement needs to be ratified by both countries' parliaments, after which Germany would send its president, Frank-Walter Steinmeier, to officially apologize for the genocide. The nations agreed not to use the term "reparation" to describe the financial aid package.

The agreement was criticized by the chairman of the Namibian Genocide Association, Laidlaw Peringanda, who insisted that Germany should purchase their ancestral lands back from the descendants of the German settlers and return it to the Herero and Nama people. The agreement was also criticized because negotiations were held solely between the German and Namibian governments, and did not include representatives of the Herero and Nama people.

Further criticism of the agreement came in 2024 with the filing of the South Africa v. Israel case at the International Court of Justice. After President Geingob criticized Germany's decision to back Israel in the case, Nandi Mazeingo of the Ovaherero Genocide Foundation called on Namibia to go further, saying "What South Africa did for Palestine is what Namibia must do for us as Hereros and Namas. They must go to that ICJ also, for us."

== Repatriation ==
Peter Katjavivi, a former Namibian ambassador to Germany, demanded in August 2008 that the skulls of Herero and Nama prisoners of the 1904–1908 uprising, which were taken to Germany for scientific research to claim the superiority of white Europeans over Africans, be returned to Namibia. Katjavivi was reacting to a German television documentary which reported that its investigators had found more than 40 of these skulls at two German universities, among them probably the skull of a Nama chief who had died on Shark Island near Lüderitz. In September 2011, the skulls were returned to Namibia. In August 2018, Germany returned all of the remaining skulls and other human remains which were examined in Germany to scientifically promote white supremacy. This was the third such transfer, and shortly before it occurred, German Protestant bishop Petra Bosse-Huber stated "Today, we want to do what should have been done many years ago – to give back to their descendents the remains of people who became victims of the first genocide of the 20th century."

On 17 May 2019, as a part of the repatriation process, the German government announced that it would return a stone symbol which it took from Namibia in the 1900s.

== Modern activism ==
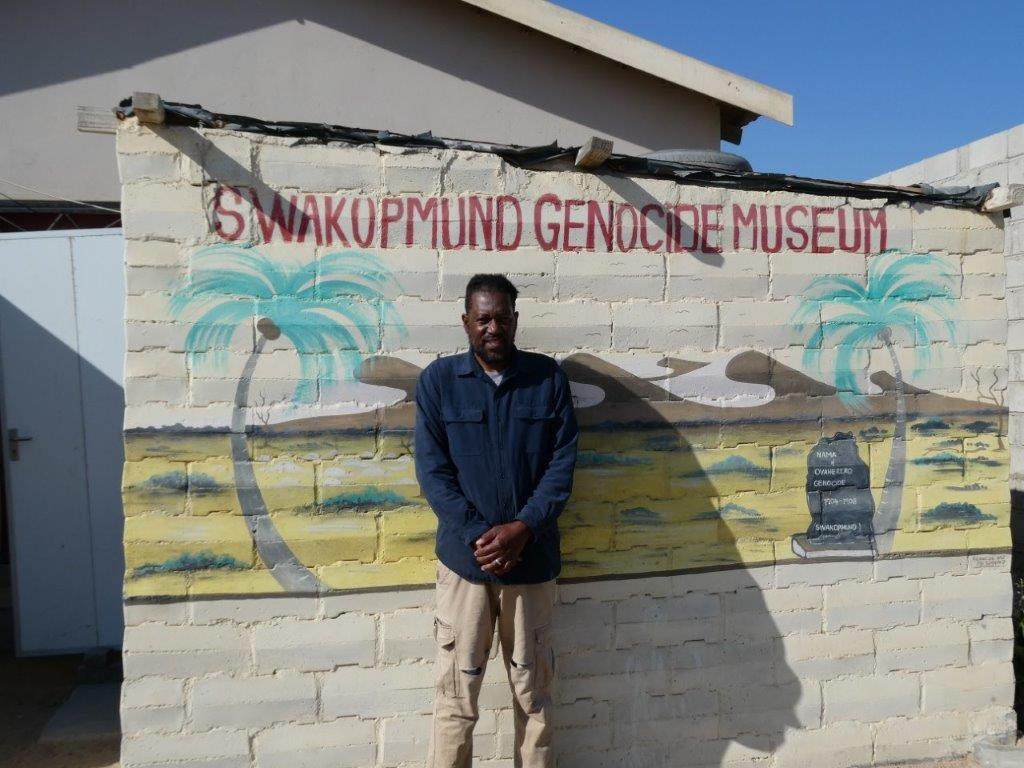
Laidlaw Peringanda in front of the Swakopmund Genocide Museum

Herero and Nama activists have organized globally to demand justice. Key groups include:

- The Ovaherero Genocide Foundation, which filed a class-action lawsuit in the U.S. (2017) invoking the Alien Tort Statute. The case was dismissed but drew international attention to the issue.
- #RememberHereroNama, a social media campaign pressuring Germany and Namibia to include descendant voices in negotiations.
- In 2023, Herero representatives petitioned the UN Working Group on People of African Descent, accusing Germany of "historical erasure" by refusing to return stolen land and human remains held in Berlin's museums.

In Swakopmund, the privately run Swakopmund Genocide Museum, founded in 2015 by Laidlaw Peringanda, the great-grandson of a survivor of the genocide, is the only institution in Namibia dedicated exclusively to preserving the memory of the genocide and campaigning for the restitution of artefacts and human remains.
