= Mondesa =

Suburb of Swakopmund, Namibia

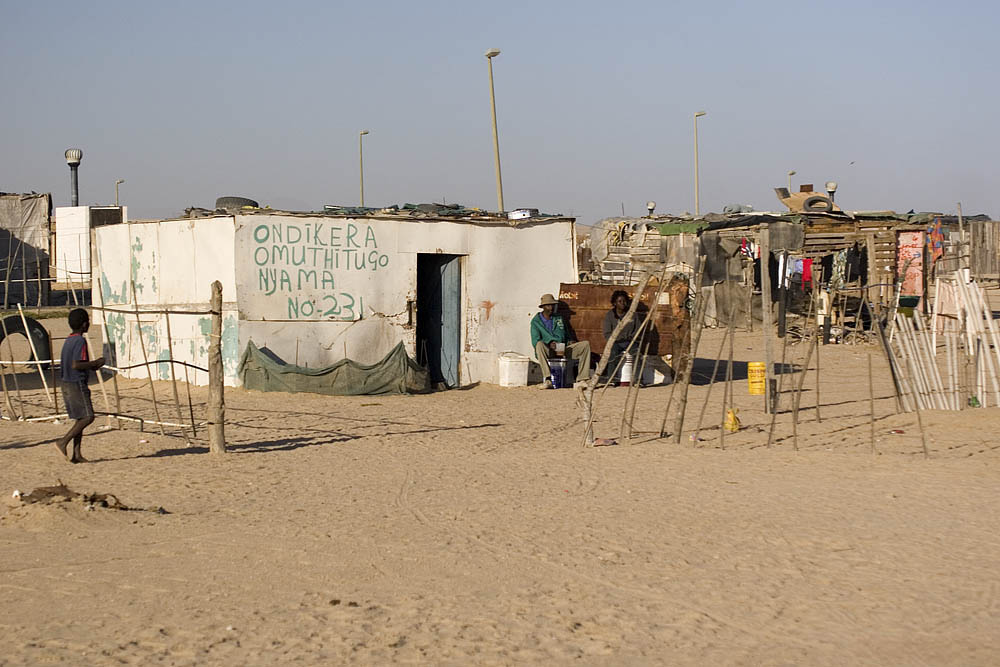
- Mondesa township on the outskirts of Swakopmund

- Location within Namibia
- Coordinates: 22°41′00″S 14°32′00″E
- Country: Namibia
- Time zone: UTC+2 (SAST)

Mondesa is a suburb of Swakopmund in central western Namibia. The residential area is located in the northeast of the town. In the northwest, it borders on the neighbourhood Tamariskia and in the south on the industrial area. Otherwise, Mondesa is bordered by the Namib Desert, with the Democratic Resettlement Community (DRC) spreading out about one kilometre away in the northeast. In 2003 the DRC was officially declared slum district of Swakopmund by the city administration. Originally Mondesa was a township for the Black people of Swakopmund. It is also the fastest-growing district with an ever-growing population. In 2017 the Swakopmund municipality erected a wall obstructing the view on the township for people entering town. The Namibian, Namibia's largest English newspaper, called it a "Wall of shame".

== See also ==
- Vineta (Swakopmund)
