= Marja Väisälä =

Finnish teacher (b. 1916, d. 2011)

- Born: 9 August 1916; Helsinki, Finland
- Died: 21 December 2011 (aged 95); Turku, Finland
- Occupations: teacher, astronomer

Marja Ilmatar Väisälä (9 May 1916, Helsinki, Finland – 21 December 2011, Turku) was a Finnish teacher of mathematics and natural sciences, who in 1950 founded a private school in Swakopmund in what is now Namibia, where she taught the children of Finnish missionaries. She also discovered two asteroids, 1718 Namibia and 2437 Amnestia, at the Turku Observatory in 1942.

== Background ==
Marja Väisälä was the daughter of astronomer Yrjö Väisälä, a renowned discoverer of minor planets. After she graduated from the university, she was going to start working as his father's assistant. However, she had heard from one of the student friends, Lahja Väänänen, of missionary work in Ovamboland. Väänänen's parents, missionaries Nestor Wäänänen and Martta Wäänänen, had worked as in Ovamboland, Nestor during 1907–1918 and 1921–1928 and Martta during 1909–1918 and 1921–1928, and Lahja herself was born in Ongandjera, Ovamboland, in 1915, so she was personally familiar with the missionary work in Ovamboland. Later she also worked in South West Africa herself, in Kavango during 1947–1953.

== Work in Swakopmund ==
=== Preparing for her work ===
Väisälä arrived in Africa in 1949. She spent her first year there in South Africa, studying the most important languages in Southern Africa, English and Afrikaans, and the local culture. South West Africa was for all practical purposes the fifth province of South Africa at the time.

=== The location of the school ===
Before Väisälä arrived in South West Africa, the Finnish missionaries there had heard of a “master of sciences in astronomy”, and they were afraid that such a highly learned person might not be suitable for teaching small children. However, Väisälä turned out to be excellent both in pedagogics and organization.

At the time, the Finnish missionaries were debating where the future Finnish school should be founded. Some of the missionaries favoured Ovamboland, and it is clear that they were thinking that some of the children would be able to live at home when attending the school. However, the children whose homes were in Kavango would not have had the same benefits, as their journeys home during vacations would have been much longer than for the other children.

Väisälä favoured Swakopmund for two reasons. First, the weather was better for children there than in Ovamboland, and there they would also be safe from the diseases that were encountered in Ovamboland, e.g. malaria. It would also be possible for the children to engage in sports activities, since the climate was cooler.

Väisälä also considered the cultural atmosphere of Swakopmund to be better there than that of Ovamboland. The matter was finally resolved by the board of the Finnish Missionary Society, which, like Väisänen, favoured Swakopmund as the location of the new school.

=== The school facilities ===
Väisälä started the school in rented premises in 1950, but it soon turned out that the premises were not large enough. The owners, too, informed her that they were going to sell the premises in the near future. In 1952 Väisälä heard that the town planned to have a new neighbourhood to the north of the town centre. On the last day of May that year, she signed a bill of purchase for two adjacent lots in the future Vineta neighbourhood. The Finns then built a house, which would function as both a school and a dormitory. A housewarming party was held in connection with the church service for the first advent in 1953. In 1858, an annex was built on the same lot, containing a garage and a room.

=== The curriculum ===
Väisälä decided to stick to the curriculum of the schools in Finland. However, the school year was that of South Africa, i.e. it was the same as a calendar year. This would have meant difficulties for those families which were returning to Finland, but many children were sent to school in Swakopmund at the age of 6, and they were ahead of children in Finland by some six months.

Väisälä taught her students three languages, English, German and Swedish. History was taught according to Finnish textbooks, but in geography and biology she concentrated on local circumstances, plants and animals. Singing and music were taught, too, but physical education, arts and crafts and art did not receive as much attention as other subjects.

== Teaching methods ==
Väisälä used a method she had devised herself, and called it “the method of expanding circles”. This method evolved out of necessity, when she had children of various grades in the same room. "The topic of the lesson would be the same for all children, but the younger students would be taught elementary knowledge and basics, whereas with the older students she would get deeper into details," wrote Kalle Seppänen in his 1994 master's thesis in theology. Seppänen wrote the following concerning Väisälä's methods:

Marja Väisälä obviously had the pedagogical and didactic ability to identify and integrate the subject matter according to the situation at hand. It seems that already in the 1950s she was able to use the spiral method and a method in which she proceeded according to the theme at hand.

Väisälä felt that the teaching of the first grade was the most difficult task, especially if the children did not know how to read when they came to school. Also, the grades from the 3rd grade up were problematic, because she was not able to devote as much time for these students as she would have wanted to. During later years she was able to get other teachers to help her with her tasks.

According to Seppänen, Väisälä was ahead of her time what came to her teaching methods. Often, she would actually teach the children but help them find out about things for themselves. This was the case inside the school building and during the many excursions and tours that she organized to various places.

In 1963, the head of the Finnish mission in South West Africa asked Väisälä if it would be possible to transfer her to the Oshigambo High School in Ovamboland, as the founder of that school, Toivo Tirronen was about to leave for Finland for a furlough. Väisälä wrote later that already during the preceding year she had thought that her various difficulties and the illnesses of the children were becoming too much for her, and she had pondered whether she was already too old to teach young children. Thus she decided to say yes to the head of the mission.

== Work in Ovamboland ==
During 1963–1972, Väisälä worked at the Oshigambo High School in Ovamboland as its teacher of mathematics and natural sciences. She described the first years of this school in her book Ambolukion lehtorina ("teaching in the Ovambo high school"; 1967). She returned to Finland in 1972 to take care of her elderly mother.

== Discovery of asteroid ==
The Minor Planet Center credits Väisälä with the discovery of the asteroids 1718 Namibia and 2437 Amnestia, both discovered at Turku Observatory on 14 September 1942. The official naming citation for 1718 Namibia was published on 1 April 1980 (M.P.C. 5281), and the one for 2437 Amnestia was published by the Minor Planet Center on 26 May 1983 (M.P.C. 7946).

== Works ==
- Väisälä, Marja (1967). Ambolukion lehtorina [Teaching in the Ovambo High School]. Helsinki: The Finnish Missionary Society. p. 183 (1).

== See also ==
- List of minor planet discoverers § M. Vaisala
