= National Marine Aquarium =

National Marine Aquarium may refer to:

- National Marine Aquarium of Namibia
- National Marine Aquarium, Plymouth
