= Martin Luther (steam locomotive) =

Historic steam tractor abandoned in the Skeleton Coast desert of Namibia

Coordinates: 22.6720°S 14.5529°E

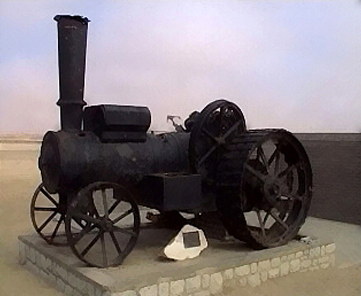
Martin Luther Road Locomotive

Martin Luther is an 8 NHP Compound J & H McLaren steam-driven traction engine Works No 527 built in November 1895 in Leeds, West Yorkshire, UK and abandoned in the desert of Skeleton Coast outside of the town of Swakopmund in Namibia, ca. 4 km from the town centre.

The "Road Locomotive" was brought to German South-West Africa by First Lieutenant Edmund Troost of the Schutztruppe for use for freight service between Swakopmund and the interior of the country, for which ox wagons had been used. The route had insufficient grazing for the oxen because of droughts and seasonal conditions, and a great many oxen died along the way.

To remedy this situation, Troost purchased the traction engine through the J & H McLaren Engineers (Leeds) agents in Germany, Fr. Dehne in Halberstadt, and had it shipped from Hamburg to Swakopmund. However, at its destination it was found that the offloading facilities could not cope with the locomotive's weight of 280 cwt (ca. 14 tonnes), and the ship continued to Walvis Bay, where the locomotive could be offloaded.

The locomotive then remained in Walvis Bay for the next four months, as Troost had other obligations in Cape Town. When Troost was able to attend to the matter again, the engine driver hired to drive it had already left for Europe again. The engine was then driven by an American and a Boer to Swakopmund over the next three months, with the engine sinking in sand almost every 50 metres. Enormous quantities of water were also required for the operation of the locomotive.

In Swakopmund, only inadequate service was available, and very few spare parts. However, the engine transported a few loads to Nonidas (ca. 11 km) and to Heigamchab.

At the beginning of 1897, due to incorrect handling, the engine ground to a halt about 4 km outside of Swakopmund, and was abandoned there. A local resident Max Rhode is said to have said in a gathering in the Bismarck Hotel the following words: “Did you know that the steam ox is called ‘Martin Luther’ now because it can also say — ‘Here I stand, I can do no other’”. Thus the engine gained its present name, although recent scholars have doubts as to whether Luther ever did utter these words.

The engine has been restored twice, first in 1973, and more recently between 2000 and 2004. After the second restoration job, a protective house was built for the engine, as it was by then apparent that the frequent mists of Swakopmund would quickly damage the engine again.
