= Swakopmund Airport =

Airport in Swakopmund, Namibia

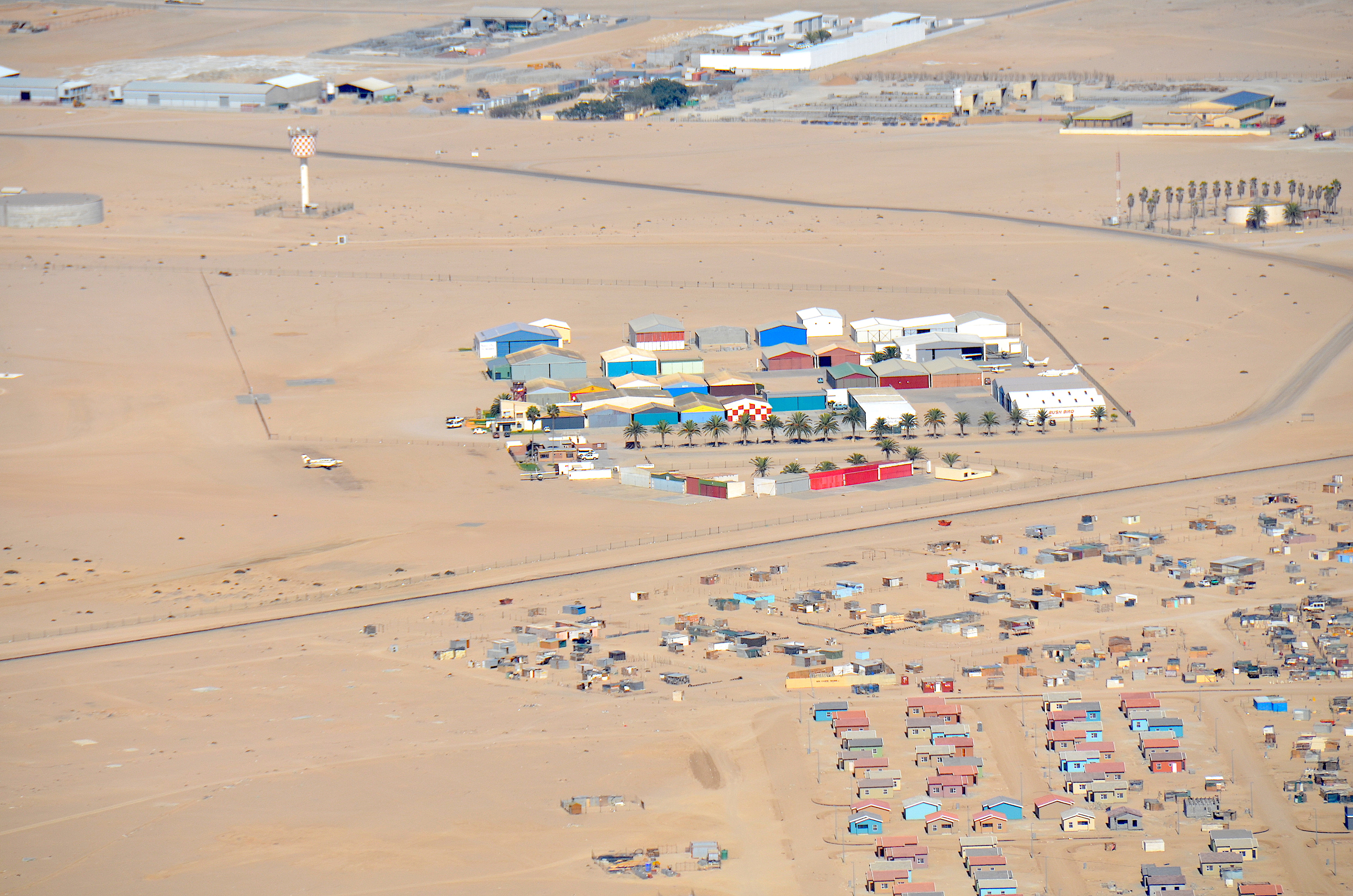
- Bird's eye view of the airport

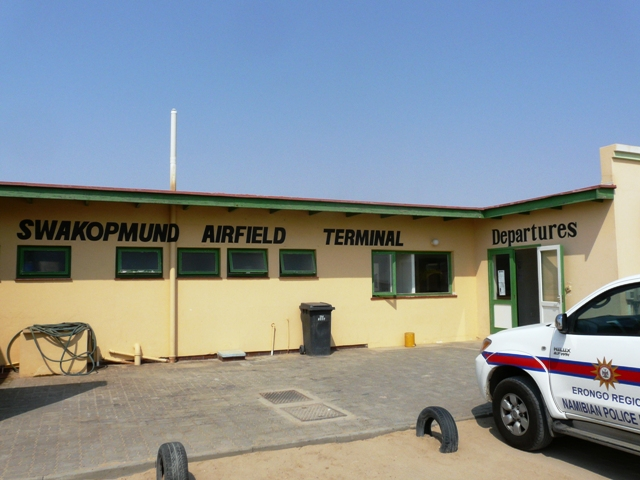
- IATA: SWP; ICAO: FYSM

Summary
- Airport type: Public
- Operator: Swakopmund Municipality
- Location: Swakopmund
- Elevation AMSL: 170 ft (52 m)
- Coordinates: 22°39′30″S 014°34′00″E

Map
- Location within Namibia

Runways
Direction	Length		Surface
Direction	m	ft	Surface
06/24	1,600	5,249	Gravel
17/35	963	3,159	Gravel
- Sources: GCM Google Maps

Swakopmund Airport (IATA: SWP, ICAO: FYSM) is a non-towered airport serving Swakopmund, a city in the Erongo Region of Namibia. There are no runway lights.

== Activities at Swakopmund Airfield ==
There are numerous charter companies operating in and out of Swakopmund on a daily basis. There is a private Aircraft Maintenance Operation for piston and turbine aircraft at the airfield.

== See also ==
- List of airports in Namibia
- Transport in Namibia
