= National Marine Aquarium of Namibia =

Coordinates: 22°41′05″S 14°31′22″E

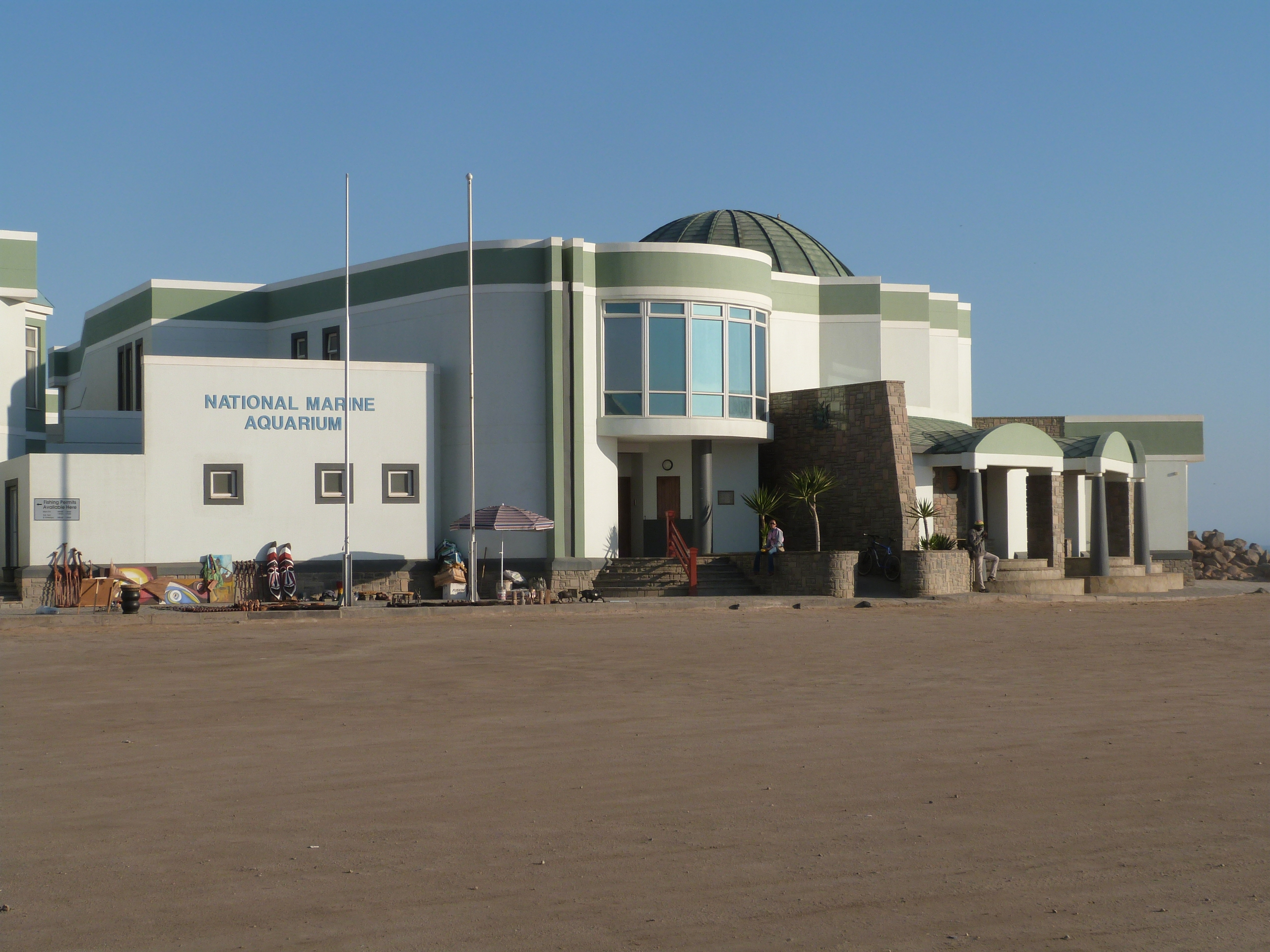
- Interactive map of National Marine Aquarium of Namibia
- Location: Swakopmund, Namibia

The National Marine Aquarium of Namibia is an aquarium in Swakopmund, Namibia. The Aquarium features fauna from the cold Benguela Current in the southern Atlantic Ocean.

The aquarium has been closed for repairs since 2023 according The Economist.
