= Vineta (Swakopmund) =

- Suburb
- Location in Namibia
- Coordinates: 22°41′S 14°32′E
- Country: Namibia
- Highest elevation: 8 m (26 ft)
- Lowest elevation: 4 m (13 ft)
- Time zone: UTC+1 (South African Standard Time)

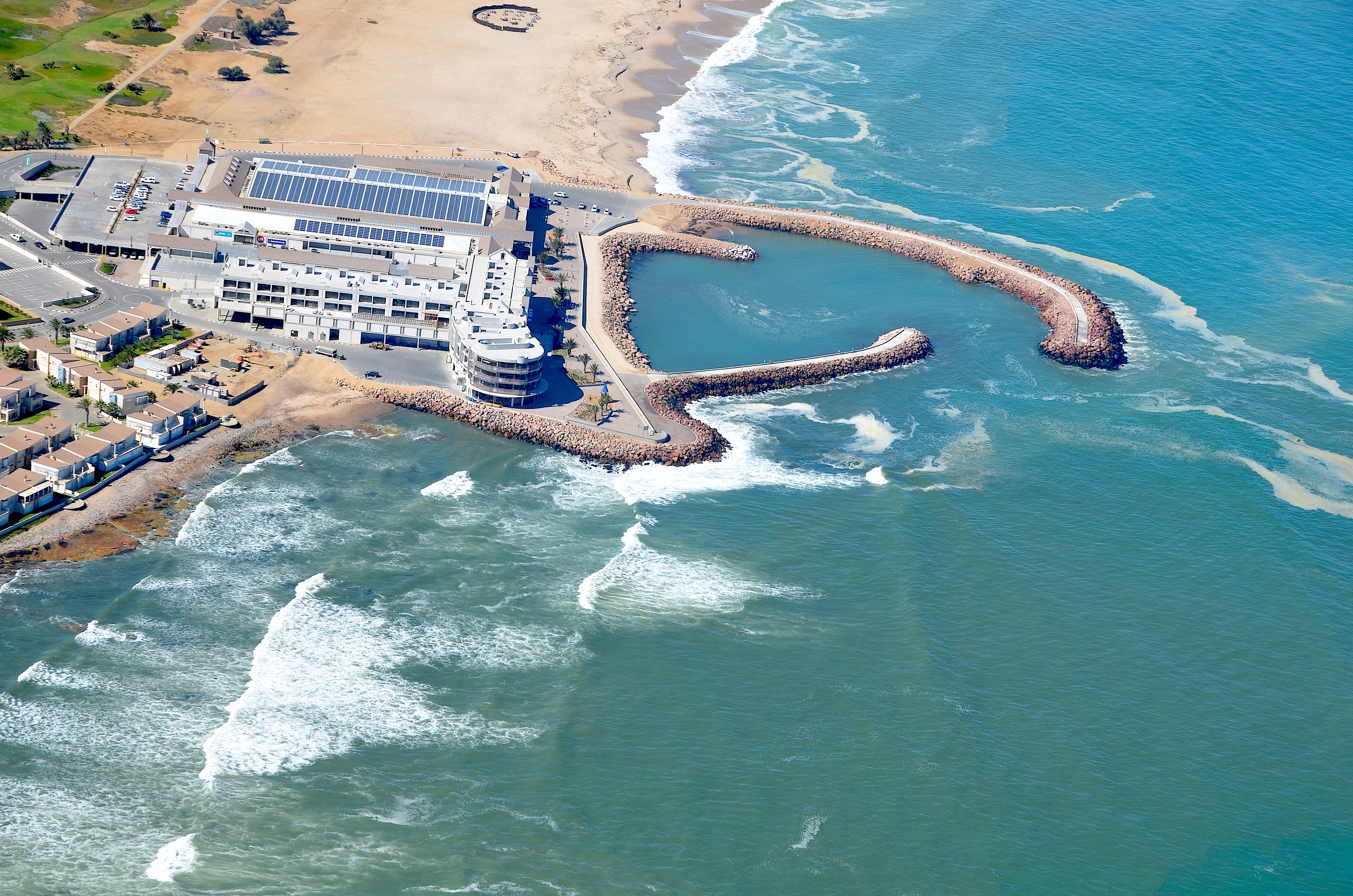
Shopping Mall Platz am Meer (Swakopmund), aerial view 2017

Vineta is one of the suburbs of the town of Swakopmund in Namibia. This neighbourhood is located to the north of the town centre and extends over 3 km along the Atlantic coast. To the east it borders on the C34 road and the Tamariskia neighbourhood.

When it was built in the 1950s, it was located about 1 km north of the town centre, with only sand and some shacks inhabited by coloured people in between. Now the town centre and Vineta form a contiguous area.

Most houses in Vineta originally belonged to white people, who permanently lived inland from the coast, their coastal properties used as holiday homes only. Nowadays, Vineta is inhabited by people belonging to the middle and upper strata of society. There are also some apartment buildings, schools and recreational facilities in the neighbourhood.

== Swakopmund Waterfront ==
A neighbourhood called the Swakopmund Waterfront in a certain part of Vineta has been planned since 2002, but due to financial problems, the construction only began in 2007. In 2004, the Waterfront received the status of being a separate residential area, whereas earlier it had been part of Vineta. Finally, plans to develop a 16,000 square metre area were approved. The construction would be done by the South African company Safari Developments, the contract worth 400 to 500 million Namibian dollars.

== Finnish Private School ==
Finnish missionary children went to school in Swakopmund since 1945. As soon as the construction of the Vineta neighbourhood began, a school building for the Finnish Private School was built in Vineta. The school operated there from 1950 to 1989 excluding the school year 1986–87. The school had grades 1–9. With one exception, the students were all children of the employees of the Finnish Missionary Society, whose parents lived mostly in Ovamboland and the Kavango Region.
