= Swakopmund Genocide Museum =

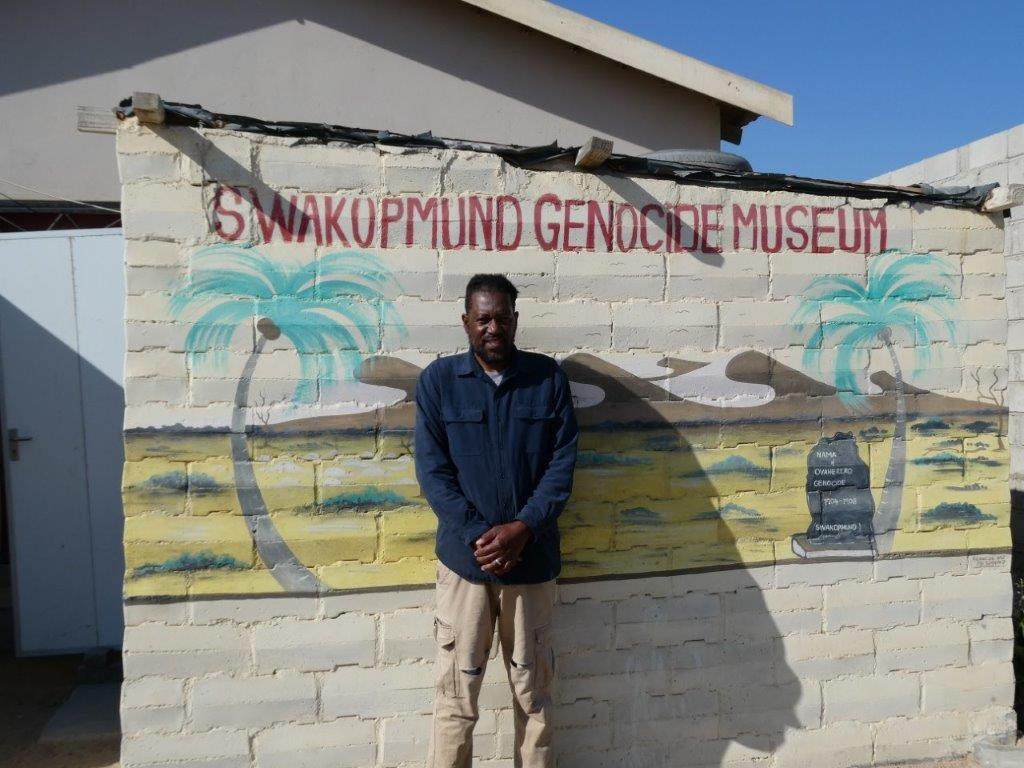
Peringanda in front of the Swakopmund Genocide Museum

The Swakopmund Genocide Museum is a small private museum in Swakopmund, Namibia, dedicated to the memory of the Herero and Nama genocide, committed by German colonial troops against the Herero and Nama between 1904 and 1908. Founded in 2015 by artist and activist Laidlaw Peringanda, the museum is regarded as the only dedicated institution in Namibia addressing this episode of colonial violence.

== History ==
The museum was established in 2015 by Laidlaw Peringanda in Swakopmund’s township of Matutura, on the outskirts of the city. His motivation stemmed from the history of his own family: his great-grandmother was a survivor of the Swakopmund concentration camp, one of several camps where Herero and Nama prisoners were forced into hard labour and where many perished.

Initially housed in a small hut, the museum moved to its current location in 2019 and received official recognition by the Namibian government the same year.

== Exhibitions and Activities ==
The museum occupies an area of around 12 square metres and displays black-and-white photographs from the German colonial period, including images of prisoners, executions, and concentration camps. Books, magazines, and personal testimonies complement the exhibits.

A central focus of the museum is the campaign for the repatriation of cultural artefacts and human remains taken during the colonial era. Peringanda has been involved in disputes with institutions such as the American Museum of Natural History in New York, which holds Namibian remains. Apart from a rifle, the collection in 2024 only included one other artefact, a repatriated Herero headdress returned from Switzerland in 2024, after having been kept for decades in a private household in Zurich.

In addition to the displays, Peringanda organises cemetery tours in Swakopmund, drawing attention to the mass graves of Herero, Nama, and other African forced labourers who died in concentration camps, from disease, or during the Spanish flu pandemic.

== Reception ==
Peringanda has faced opposition from the Swakopmund town council, which has expressed concern about the impact of his activism on tourism. He has also received death threats from some German-Namibians due to his advocacy for renaming streets, removing monuments, and demanding the restitution of artefacts and human remains.

In 2024, tensions arose between Peringanda and the Municipality of Swakopmund after his application to use a temporary structure at his residence in Matutura as the museum’s administrative office was rejected. He stated that earlier requests for land near the Swakopmund cemetery had also been denied.

In 2022, Germany pledged financial support for the museum, providing €50,000 to help expand its activities, including the restoration of mass graves. The museum has also attracted increasing attention from international tourists, researchers, and young Namibians, including some from the German-speaking community of Swakopmund.
