= Democratic Resettlement Community =

Human settlement in Namibia

Coordinates: 22.6456°S 14.5656°E

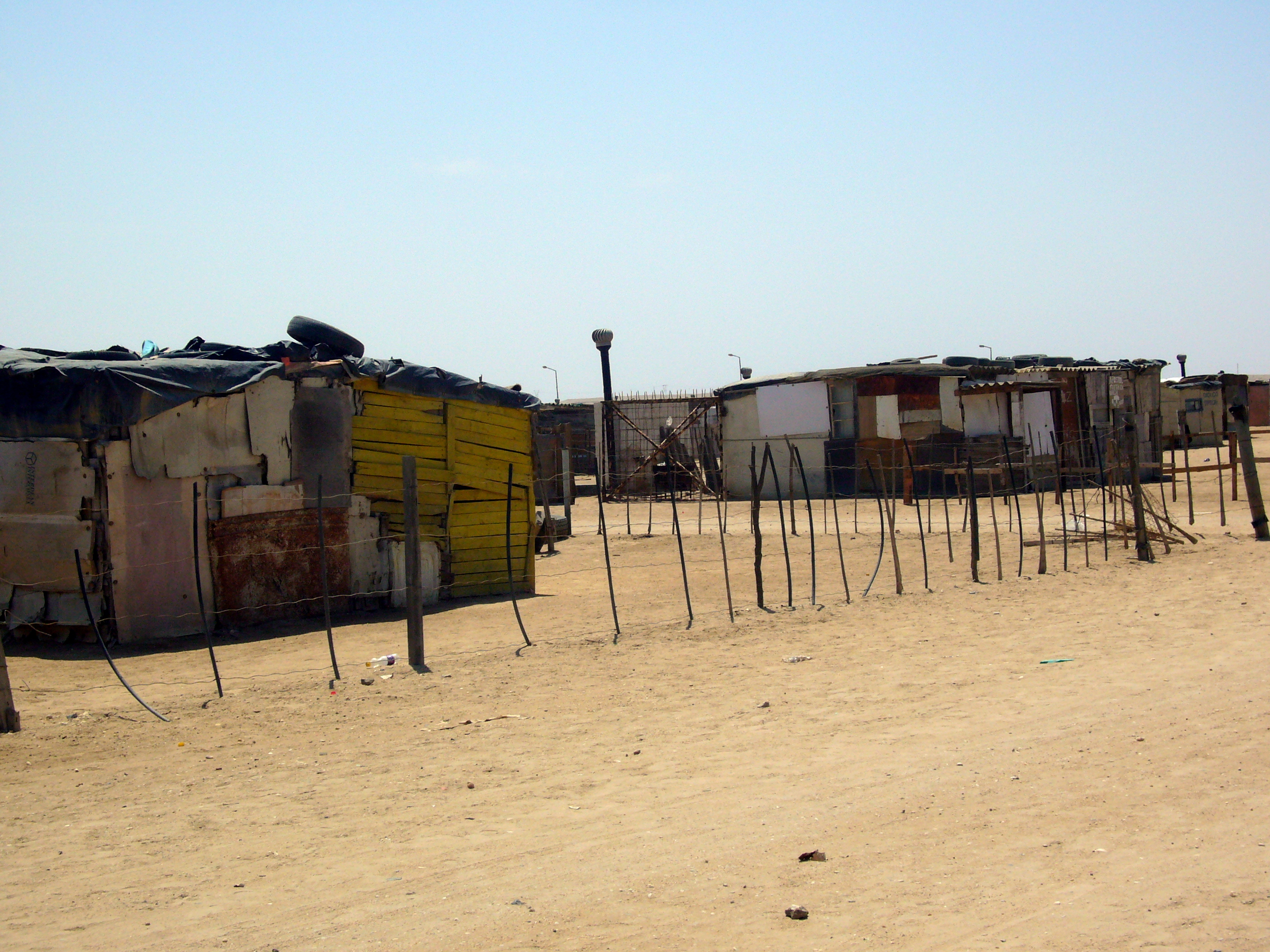
The Democratic Resettlement Community (DRC), a slum area of Swakopmund

The Democratic Resettlement Community (DRC) is an informal settlement, or a slum, in Swakopmund, Erongo Region, Namibia. It was founded in 2001 as a temporary resettlement community for people waiting for subsidized housing in the city and was built mostly of reclaimed garbage from the city landfill. The materials included corrugated metal, wood, canvas and plastic.

In 2015, the population was estimated to be around 20,000. There is no electricity and no sanitation. The running water came from one tap, installed in 2012. Inhabitants found employment working menial jobs in Swakopmund.

By 2019, the Swakopmund municipality had spent over N$200 million on facilities at the DRC. The government food program was supplying families with food packages. The DRC includes a youth development and community centre, a clinic and laboratory, and a hostel for orphans. The Dantago Arts and Craft centre was built by the residents using recycled plastic materials, such as bottles, combined with cement.
