= Swakopmund =

Swakopmund: Tsoaxaub (Khoekhoe); Otjozondjii (Otjiherero)
- City
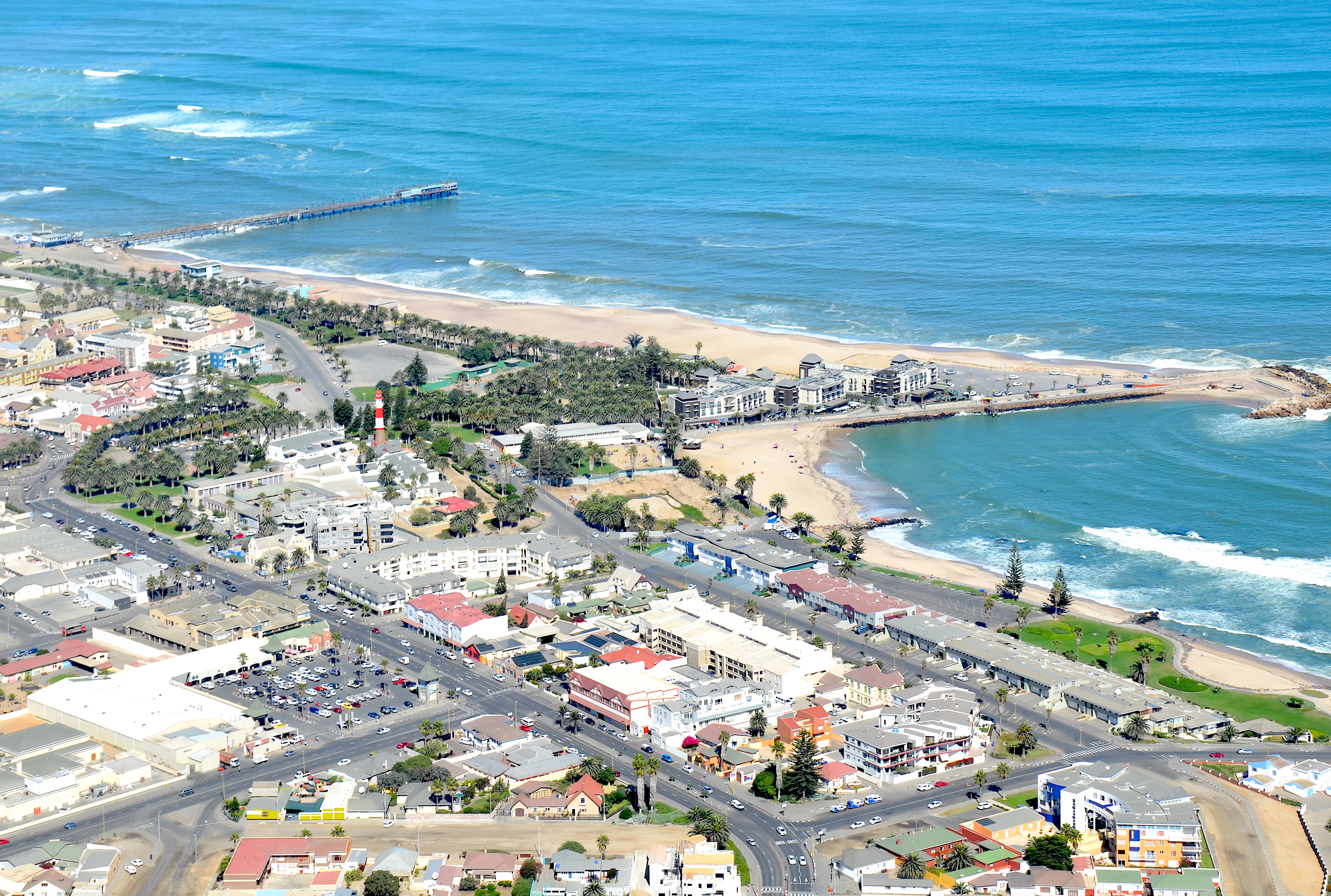
- Swakopmund in 2017

- Coat of arms
- Nickname: Swakop
- Motto: Providentiae memor
- Location in Namibia
- Coordinates: 22°41′S 14°32′E
- Country: Namibia
- Region: Erongo
- Constituency: Swakopmund Constituency
- Established: 4 August 1892

Government
  - Mayor: Blasius Goraseb (LPM)
  - Deputy Mayor: Suama Kautondokwa (SWAPO)

Population (2023 census)
  - Total: 75,921
- Time zone: UTC+2 (SAST)
- Climate: BWk
- Website: swakopmun.com

Swakopmund ('Mouth of the Swakop') is a city on the coast of western Namibia, 352 km (219 mi) west of the Namibian capital Windhoek via the B2 main road. It is the capital of the Erongo administrative district. It had 75,921 inhabitants in 2023.

The city is situated at the edge of the Namib Desert and is the fourth largest population centre in Namibia. Swakopmund is a popular beach resort and characterized by 19th century German colonial architecture. The city was founded in 1892 as the main harbour for German South West Africa.

Buildings in the city include the Altes Gefängnis, a prison designed by Heinrich Bause in 1909. The Woermannhaus, built in 1906 with a prominent tower (Damara tower), is now a public library. Attractions in Swakopmund include the Swakopmund Museum, the National Marine Aquarium of Namibia, the Crystal Gallery.

Activities like quad biking, camel rides, sky diving, paragliding and desert day trips are offered in the sand dunes near Langstrand, south of the Swakop River.

Outside the city, the Rossmund Desert Golf Course is one of only five all-grass desert golf courses in the world. Nearby is a farm that offers camel rides to tourists and the Martin Luther steam locomotive, dating from 1896 and abandoned in the desert.

== History ==
=== Etymology ===
The town is named after the Swakop River. The German settlers rendered it Swachaub, and when in 1896 the district was officially proclaimed, the version Swakopmund (German: Mouth of the Swakop) was introduced.

The Herero called the place Otjozondjii, which means 'place of seashells'.

=== Until World War I ===
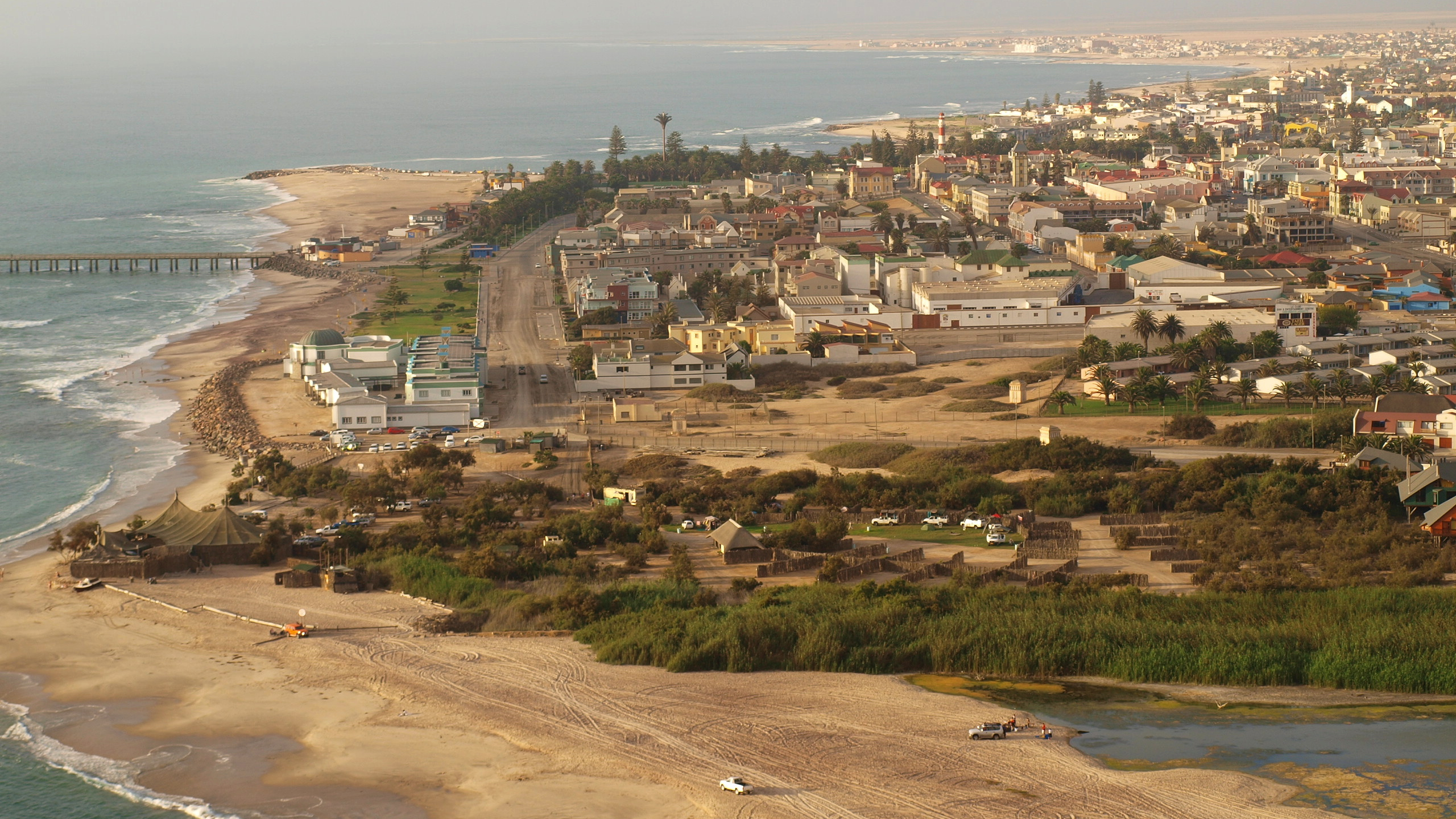
Swakopmund

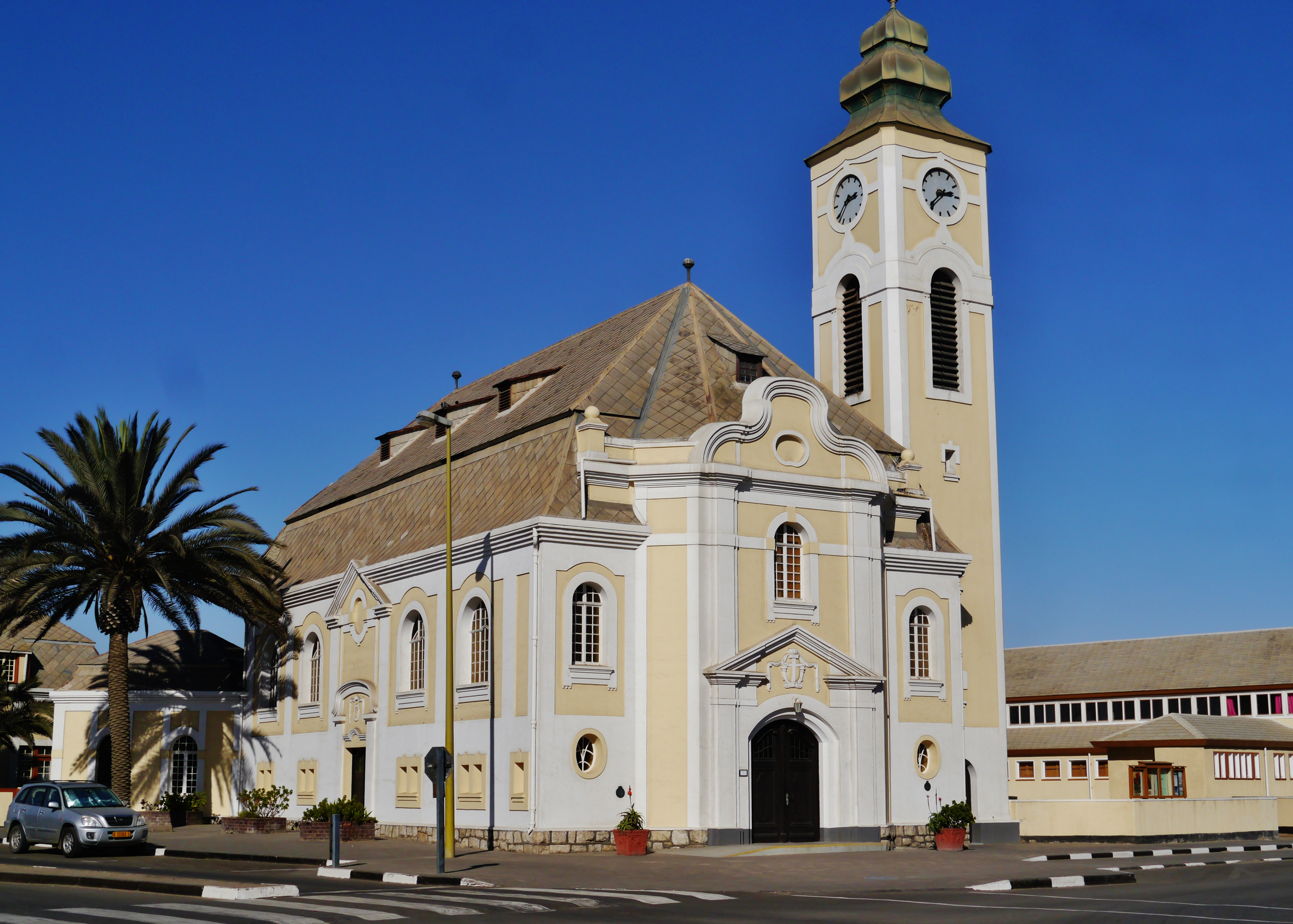
The Deutsche Evangelisch-Lutherische Church in the centre of Swakopmund, Namibia.

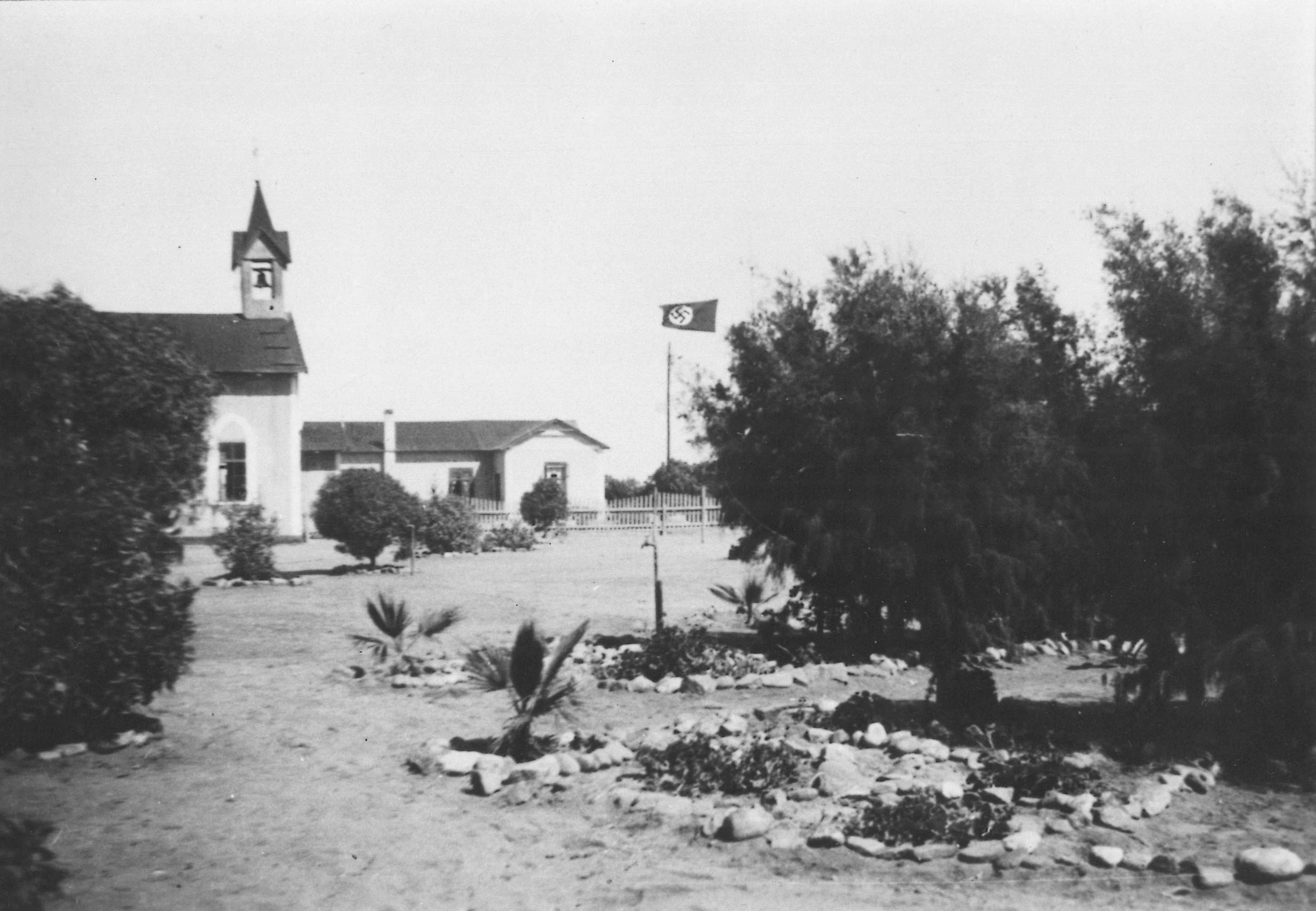
Mission Church and building of the Rheinische Missionsgesellschaft in 1938 near a visible Nazi German flag.

Captain Curt von François founded Swakopmund in 1892 as the main harbour for the Imperial German colony—the natural deep-sea harbour at Walvis Bay belonged to the British. The founding date was on August 8 when the crew of gunboat Hyäne erected two beacons on the shore. Swakopmund was chosen for the availability of fresh water and a relatively easy connection into the centre of the South West African territory, particularly Otjimbingwe and Windhoek. Other sites such as Sandwich Harbour and Cape Cross were found unsuitable due to dune belts that block the way to the hinterland.

The Swakop site did not offer any natural protection to ships lying off the coast, a geographical feature sparsely located along Namibia's coast. When the first 120 Schutztruppe soldiers and 40 settlers were offloaded at Swakopmund in 1893, they had to dig caves into the sand for shelter. The offloading was done by Kru tribesmen from Liberia who used special boats. Woermann-Linie, the operator of the shipping route to Germany, employed 600 Kru at that time.

Swakopmund quickly became the main port for imports and exports for the whole territory and was one of six towns which received municipal status in 1909. Many governmental departments for German South West Africa had offices in Swakopmund. During the Herero Wars and subsequent Herero and Nama genocide, a concentration camp for Herero and Nama people was operated in town. Inmates were forced into slave labour, resulting in the death of approximately 2,000 Herero.

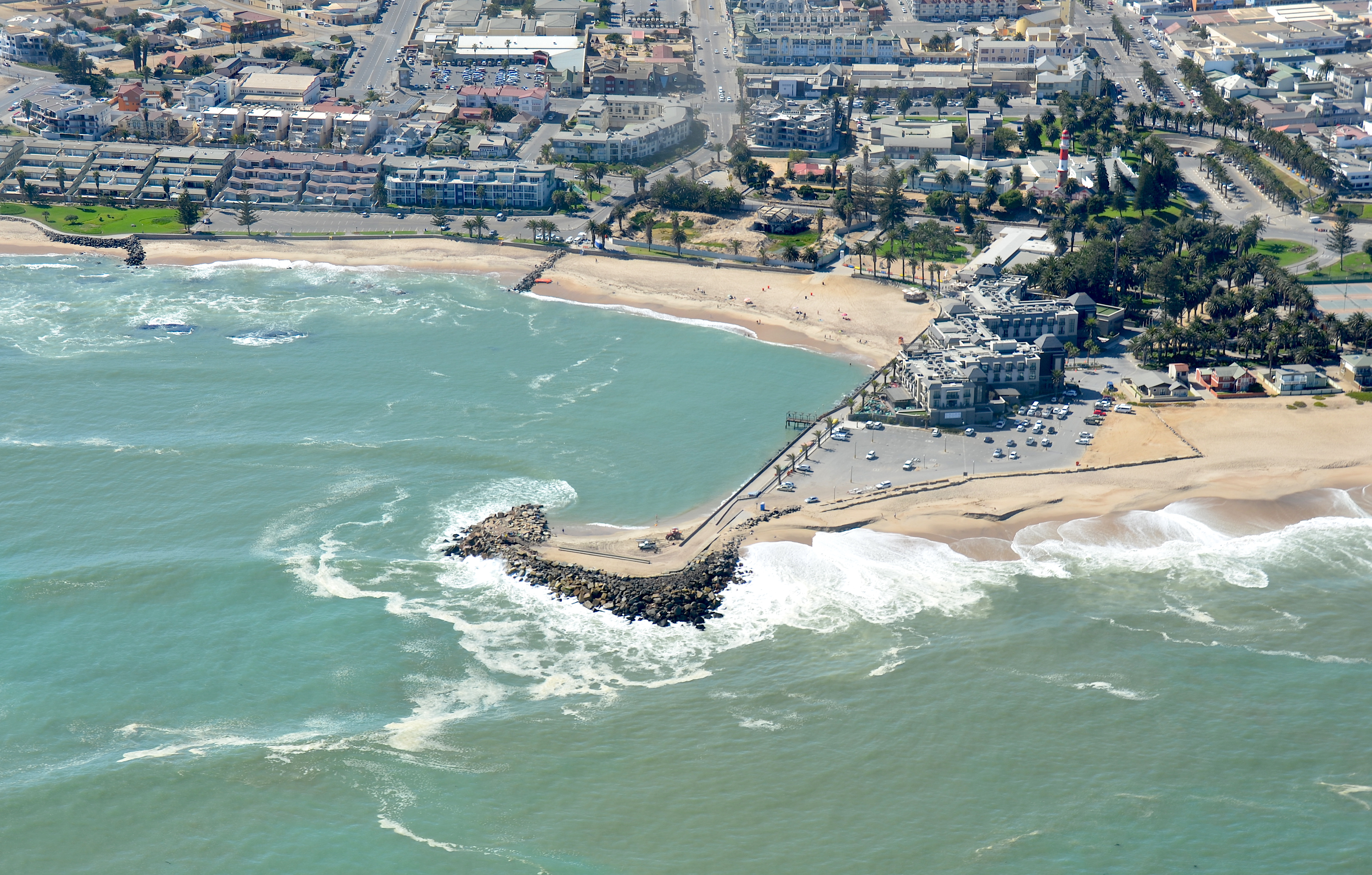
Aerial view of Mole Swakopmund (2017)

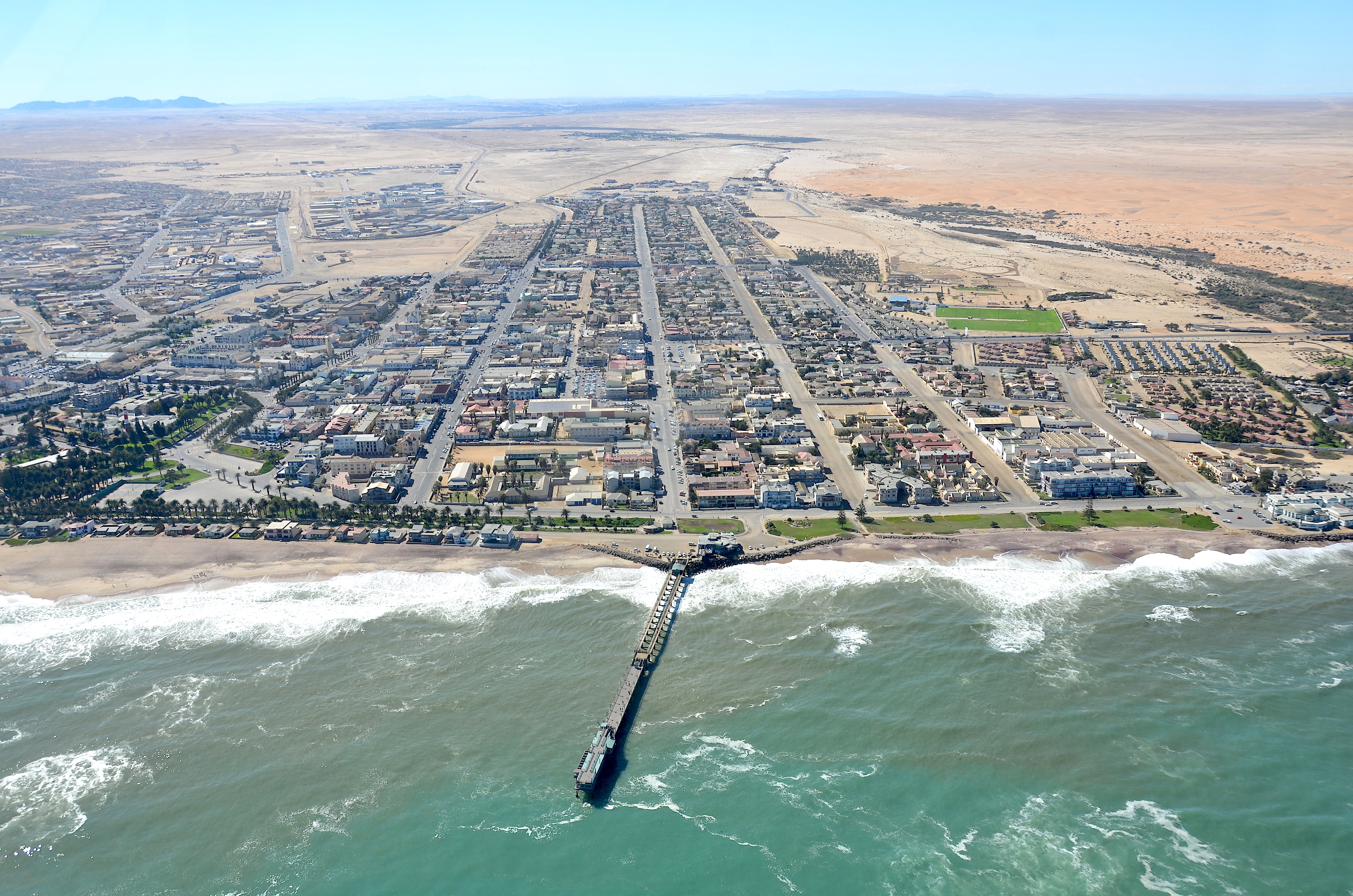
Aerial view of Swakopmund Jetty (2017)

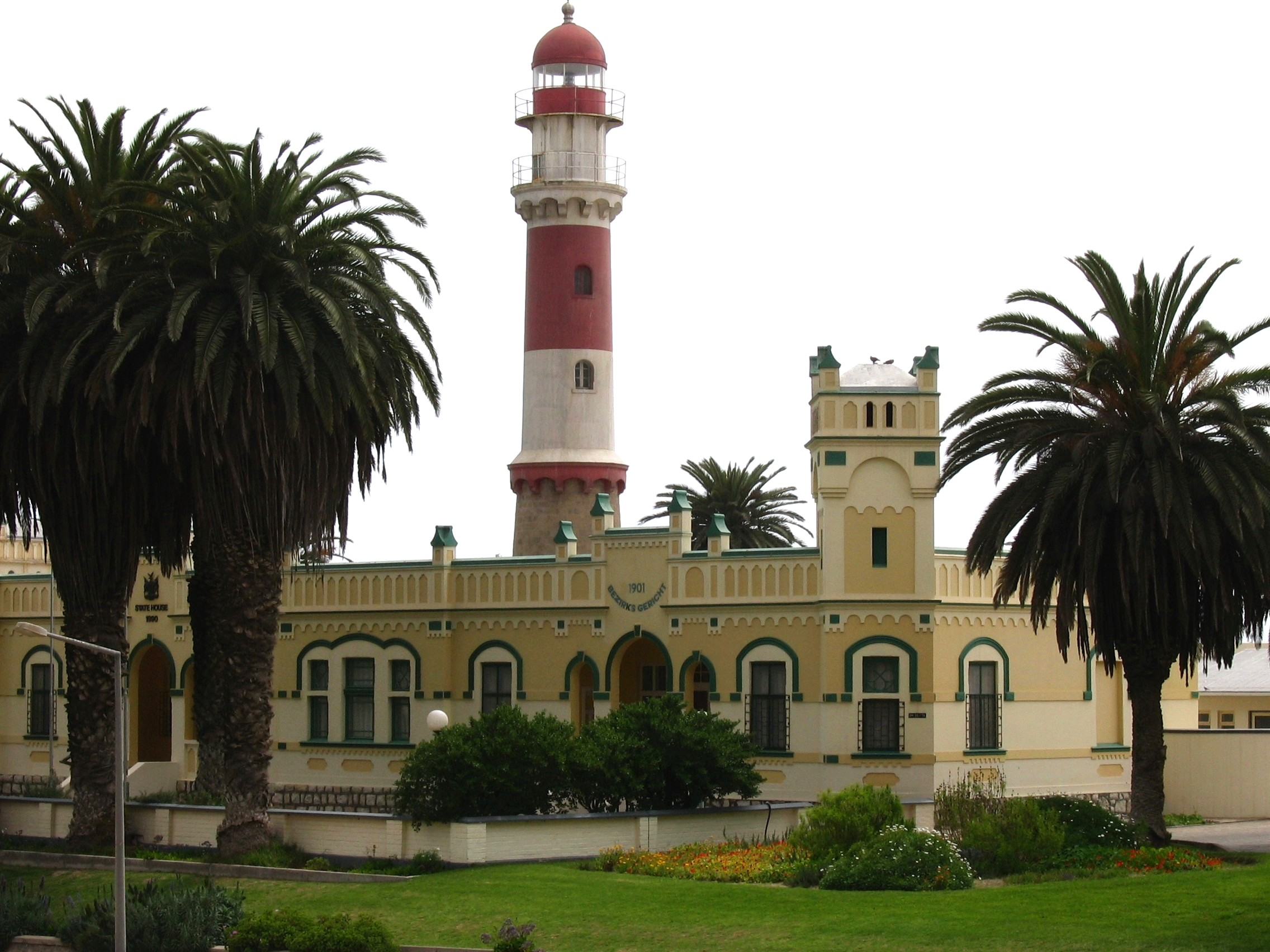
Swakopmund Lighthouse

Soon, the harbour created by the "mole" (breakwater) silted up, and in 1905, work was started on a wooden jetty, but in the long term this was inadequate. In 1914, construction of a steel jetty was therefore commenced. Trading and shipping companies founded branches in Swakopmund.

=== Until Namibian independence ===
Early in World War I in 1915, German South West Africa was taken over by the Union of South Africa. With this, the logistic and political barriers disappeared to use the harbour in Walvis Bay for South West Africa, as the territory now became known. In Swakopmund all harbour activities ceased, central government services disappeared, and the jetty became a pedestrian walkway. Businesses closed down, the number of inhabitants diminished, and the town fell into decline.

However, Swakopmund had been guaranteed a lifeline in a 1923 treaty in London negotiating the aftermath of World War I. Its moderate climate and location on the Atlantic made it suitable as a holiday resort for the white population of the territory, and the town was re-shaped into a tourism destination. Having lost its military importance, Swakopmund was used for recreation even during World War II, and in the 1940s and 1950s it was expanded to serve more and more tourists.

Swakopmund was known for its continued glorification of Nazism after World War II, including the celebration of Hitler's birthday and "Heil Hitler" Nazi salutes given by residents. In 1976, The New York Times quoted a German working in a Swakopmund hotel who described the city as "more German than Germany". As of the 1980s, Nazi paraphernalia was available to buy in shops.

With the opening of the Rössing uranium mine in 1976, Swakopmund changed its shape once again. While this mine 60 kilometres (37 mi) to the east eventually got its own town built, Arandis, logistics and workers' accommodation were first supplied by Swakopmund. In 1976, the city had roughly 7,000 white residents, and a similar number of black and coloured residents living in a township across the railways tracks from the rest of the city.

=== Since 1990 ===
After Namibian independence from South Africa in 1990, many street names were changed from their original German, or in some cases, Afrikaans names, to honour Namibians, predominantly Namibians of black heritage. For example, in 2001, then-president of Namibia Sam Nujoma renamed the main street (Kaiser-Wilhelm-Straße) Sam Nujoma Avenue in honour of himself.

Swakopmund hosted the inaugural African Traditional Sports and Games Championship from August 14 to 19, 2026.

== Economy and infrastructure ==
Swakopmund lies on the B2 road, and on the Trans-Namib Railway from Windhoek to Walvis Bay. It is served by Swakopmund Airport and Swakopmund railway station.

Public health facilities in Swakopmund are the Swakopmund State Hospital and the Tamariskia Clinic. The main private healthcare provider in the city is the Cottage Medi-Clinic, a hospital with 70 beds.

The Swakopmund Correctional Facility is one of Namibia's seven major prisons.

=== Mining ===
The discovery of uranium at Rössing 70 km (43 mi) outside town led to the development of the world's largest open-pit uranium mine and the foundation of Arandis. This had an enormous impact on all facets of life in Swakopmund which necessitated expansion of the infrastructure of the town to make it into one of the most modern in Namibia.

Salt Company Swakopmund produces approximately 120,000 tons of table salt per year through solar evaporation of sea water. The salt is marketed as "Light Flow".

=== Tourism ===
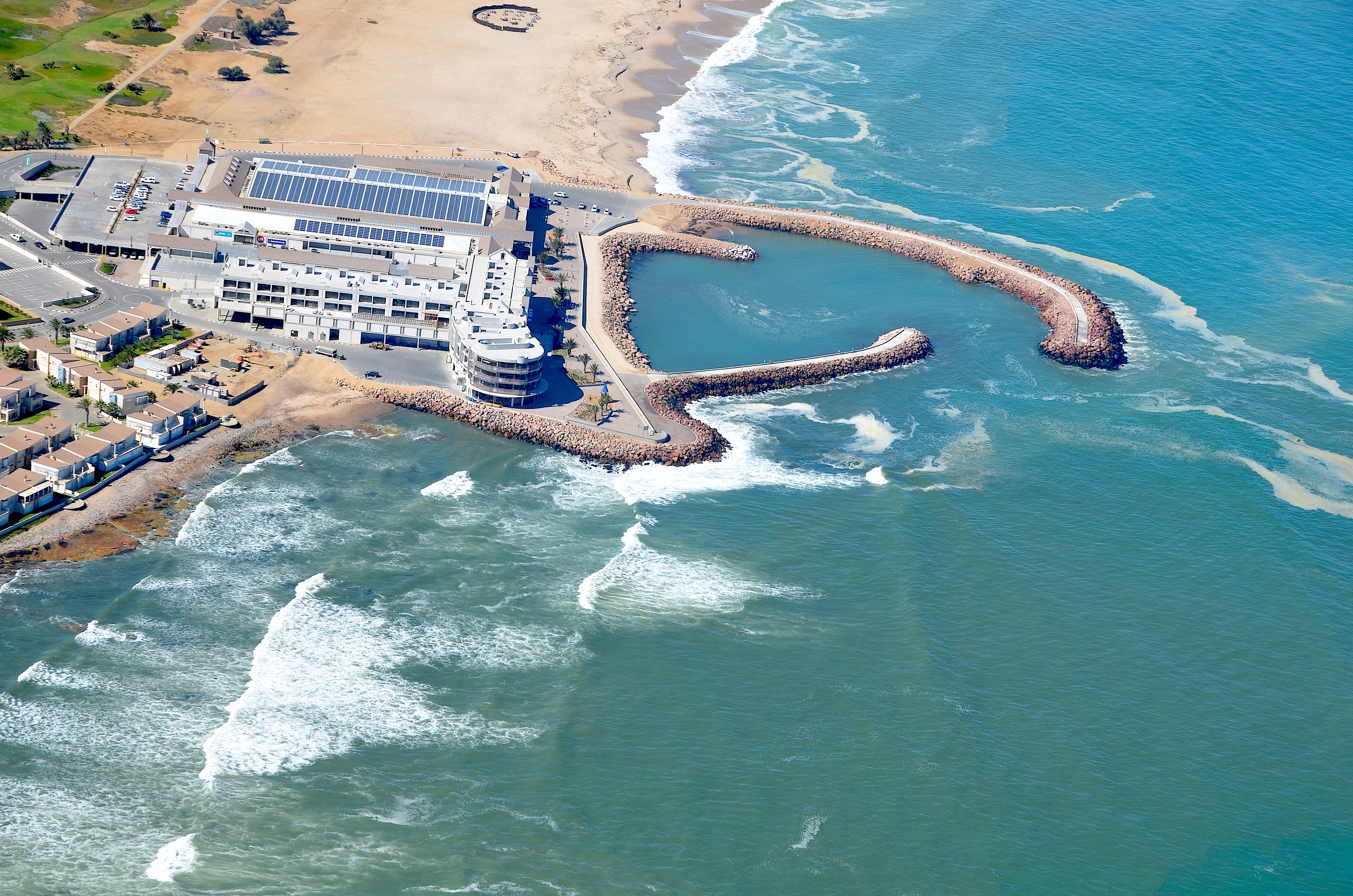
Shopping Mall Platz am Meer (Swakopmund-Vineta), aerial view 2017

The city has scattered coffee shops, night clubs, bars, and hotels. Recreation includes balloon rides, skydiving, quad biking, and small marine cruises. The Swakopmund Skydiving Club has operated from Swakopmund Airport since its founding in 1972.

There are three museums, the Swakopmund Museum, the Kristall Galerie (English: Crystal gallery) and the Martin Luther (steam locomotive) museum outside town.

As of the 1970s, German influences remained evident, including German street names, a German daily newspaper, and the German language being spoken by some residents, with The New York Times quoting a local interviewee who described the town as "more German than Germany". A 2008 New York Times article describes the town as having "the dislocating feel of a Baltic Sea resort set in the tropics".

=== Technology ===
In October 2000, an agreement was signed between the Namibian and People's Republic of China governments to build a satellite tracking station at Swakopmund. Construction was completed in July 2001 at a site north of Swakopmund to the east of the Henties Bay-Swakopmund road and opposite the Swakopmund Salt Works. The site was chosen as it was on the orbital track of a crewed spacecraft during its re-entry phase. Costing N$12 million, the complex covers an area of 150m by 85m. It is equipped with five metre and nine metre satellite dishes.

=== Education ===
The German school Regierungsschule Swakopmund was previously located in the city. The four secondary schools are Secondary School Swakopmund, Namib High School, Private School Swakopmund, and Coastal High School. West Side High School, Atlantic High School and Private School Swakopmund include both primary and secondary grades. Other Primary schools include Hanganeni Primary, Tamariskia Primary, Festus ǃGonteb Primary, Swakopmund Primary, Namib Primary and Vrede Rede Primary Schools.

On the outskirts of the city, the Swakopmund Genocide Museum, founded in 2015 by artist and activist Laidlaw Peringanda, documents the German colonial genocide against the Herero and Nama and serves as a centre for remembrance and education.

== Politics ==
=== Administrative divisions ===
There are the following districts and suburbs in Swakopmund:

- Town Centre
- Vineta
- Mile 4
- Ocean View
- Kramersdorf
- Vogelstrand
- Waterfront
- Mondesa
- Matutura
- Industrial Area
- Tamariskia
- Democratic Resettlement Community (DRC), an informal settlement founded in 2001 as temporary housing for people waiting for subsidized housing in the city.

Most inhabitants of the town live in the suburbs of Vineta, Tamariskia, Mondesa and Vogelstrand. Both black and white people, mostly well-to-do, live in Vineta. Tamariskia was originally a neighbourhood for the coloured people, built in the early 1970s, to replace the shacks the coloureds earlier had between the town centre and Vineta. Mondesa existed already in the 1960s, and it was a neighbourhood for the black people, and it was a considerable distance from the town centre in the early days.

=== Local authority elections ===
Swakopmund is governed by a municipal council that has ten seats.

Namibia's ruling SWAPO party won the 2010 local authority election with 4,496 votes, followed by the local Swakopmund Residents Association (SRA, 1,005 votes), the United Democratic Front (UDF, 916 votes), the Rally for Democracy and Progress (RDP, 666 votes), and the National Unity Democratic Organisation (NUDO, 280 votes). The 2015 local authority election was again won by SWAPO which gained six seats (5,534 votes). One seat each was won by the UDF (1,168 votes), the SRA (790 votes), the Democratic Turnhalle Alliance (DTA, 497 votes), and NUDO (296 votes).

The 2020 local authority election was won by the Independent Patriots for Change (IPC), an opposition party formed in August 2020. The IPC obtained 3,458 votes and gained three seats. SWAPO was the runner-up, obtaining 2,745 votes and also gaining three seats. The SRA obtained 1,575 votes and two seats, and one seat each went to the Landless People's Movement (LPM, a new party registered in 2018, 1,059 votes) and the UDF with 641 votes.

== Geography ==
=== Climate ===
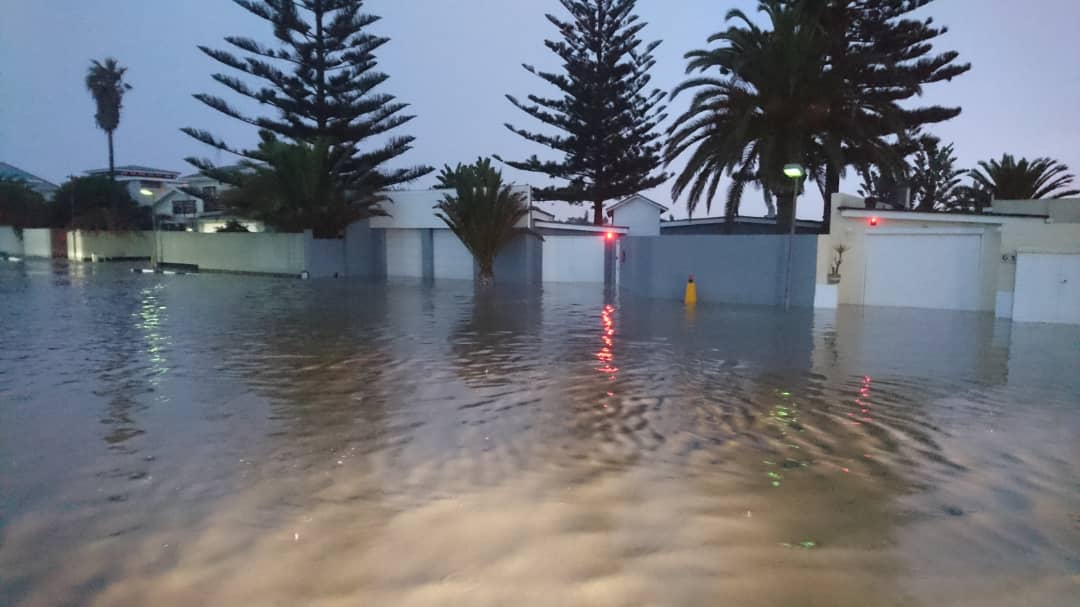
Late summer rains, Swakopmund, Easter 2018

Surrounded by the Namib Desert on three sides and the cold Atlantic waters to the west, Swakopmund has a desert climate (BWk, according to the Köppen climate classification) with mild conditions year-round. The average temperature ranges from 15 to 25 °C or 59 to 77 °F. Rainfall is less than 20 millimetres or 0.8 inches per year, making gutters and drainpipes on buildings a rarity. The cold Benguela Current supplies moisture for the area in the form of fog that can reach as deep as 140 km (87 mi) inland. Fog that originates offshore from the collision of the cold Benguela Current and warm air from the Hadley Cell creates a fog belt that frequently envelops parts of the Namib desert. Coastal regions can experience more than 180 days of thick fog a year. While this has proved a major hazard to ships – more than one thousand wrecks litter the Skeleton Coast – it is a vital source of moisture for desert life. The fauna and flora of the area have adapted to this phenomenon and now rely upon the fog as a source of moisture. The climate is cold for its latitude, which is just northern of Southern Tropics, and summer months (Dec, Jan, Feb) are even colder than 20 degrees Celsius. This means summer in Swakopmund is colder than winter in Southern Florida (for example Miami), although Swakopmund is closer to the equator.

Climate data for Swakopmund
Month	Jan	Feb	Mar	Apr	May	Jun	Jul	Aug	Sep	Oct	Nov	Dec	Year
Mean daily maximum °C (°F)	22 (72)	23 (73)	22 (72)	21 (70)	21 (70)	20 (68)	20 (68)	18 (64)	18 (64)	19 (66)	21 (70)	22 (72)	21 (69)
Mean daily minimum °C (°F)	16 (61)	16 (61)	16 (61)	14 (57)	12 (54)	11 (52)	10 (50)	10 (50)	11 (52)	12 (54)	14 (57)	15 (59)	13 (56)
Average rainfall mm (inches)	1 (0.0)	2 (0.1)	6 (0.2)	2 (0.1)	1 (0.0)	1 (0.0)	0 (0)	0 (0)	1 (0.0)	0 (0)	1 (0.0)	1 (0.0)	16 (0.4)
Source: World Climate Guide

=== Demographics ===
Historical population
Year	Pop.	±% p.a.
2001	23,808	—
2011	44,725	+6.51%
2023	75,921	+4.51%

== Notable people ==
- Rosina ǁHoabes, former mayor of the town
- Werner Schulz (footballer) (1913–1947), was born in Swakopmund
- Peter Thiel, venture capitalist, went to school here in 1976 and 1977
- Razundara Tjikuzu, former professional footballer

== In popular culture ==
Swakopmund was the filming location for Mad Max: Fury Road. In August 2008, filming commenced in Swakopmund on the AMC television series The Prisoner starring Jim Caviezel and Sir Ian McKellen. In 2002, the city appeared on The Amazing Race 2 and was visited again in The Amazing Race 26. In 2019, MTV's The Challenge: War of the Worlds was filmed in Swakopmund, including the dunes of the Namib Desert and Swakopmund's coast.
