= Hoachanas =

- Settlement
- Location in Namibia
- Coordinates: 23°55′S 18°3′E
- Country: Namibia
- Region: Hardap Region
- Constituency: Mariental Rural Constituency

Population (2001)
  - Total: 3,000
- Time zone: UTC+2 (South African Standard Time)

Hoachanas (Khoekhoe: ǃHoaxaǃnâs) is a settlement of 3,000 inhabitants in the Hardap Region of southern central Namibia, located 55 kilometres (34 mi) northeast of Kalkrand. It is situated at the junction of the main road C21 from Kalkrand, and C15 from Dordabis to Stampriet and belongs to the Mariental Rural electoral constituency.

Inhabited since at least 1695, Hoachanas is the main settlement of the Khaiǁkhaun (Red Nation), the largest and most important of the subtribes of the Nama people. All chiefs of the Red Nation had their main residence at this settlement. Hoachanas is also the home of Markus Kooper, reverend, educator and anti-apartheid activist.

Hoachanas has a Combined School from Pre- Primary to Grade 11 that is named after the first principal of the school Piet Jan Tsai-Tsaib.

== Geography ==
Hoachanas is situated on Namibia's Central Plateau in an Acacia tree and shrub savanna typical for the Kalahari. The area has an elevation of 1,200 to 1,500 metres (3,900–4,900 ft), the average annual rainfall is 200 to 250 millimetres (7.9–9.8 in). The settlement is cut by the !Guwisib River, a tributary to the ephemeral Auob River.

The majority of the houses at the settlement are shacks made from iron sheets. Almost half of the villagers are unemployed, literacy levels are low. The main economic activity is small livestock farming with goats and sheep.

== History ==
=== Pre–colonial period ===
Hoachanas has been the main settlement of the Red Nation, a subtribe of the Nama people, since the formation of this group at the end of the 17th century. There is a perennial spring at the centre of today's settlement, located behind the old Lutheran church.

The Hoachanas Peace Treaty of 1858 saw an alliance formed between Orlam chief Jonker Afrikaner and Nama chief ǁOaseb, two of the most powerful tribal leaders in South-West Africa of that time. This treaty partitioned southern and central South-West Africa into Namaland and Hereroland, with the area controlled by the Nama people reaching from the Kalahari to the Auas Mountains near Windhoek. Although not of Herero descent, Jonker Afrikaner was accepted as the leader of Hereroland and remained in that position until he was defeated by Maharero in 1880. 13 Nama chiefs ratified the treaty. The original document survived and is stored at the National Archives of Namibia in Windhoek.

When Manasse ǃNoreseb assumed chieftaincy of the Red Nation in 1880, Hendrik Witbooi, leader of the ǀKhowesin (Witbooi Nama), had risen to considerable power. Witbooi was an archenemy of Manasse. He installed a rival chief for the Red Nation, ǃHoeb ǁOasemab (Fritz Lazarus ǁOaseb), and attacked Hoachanas several times. Manasse and his clan, although since 1885 under a protection treaty with the German Empire which had in 1884 established the colony of German South-West Africa, fled their home settlement in 1889 and moved to Seeis, which was situated in an area under the control of Maharero. After Witbooi's troops were defeated by the Germans in 1894, Manasse returned to Hoachanas.

=== German colonial period ===
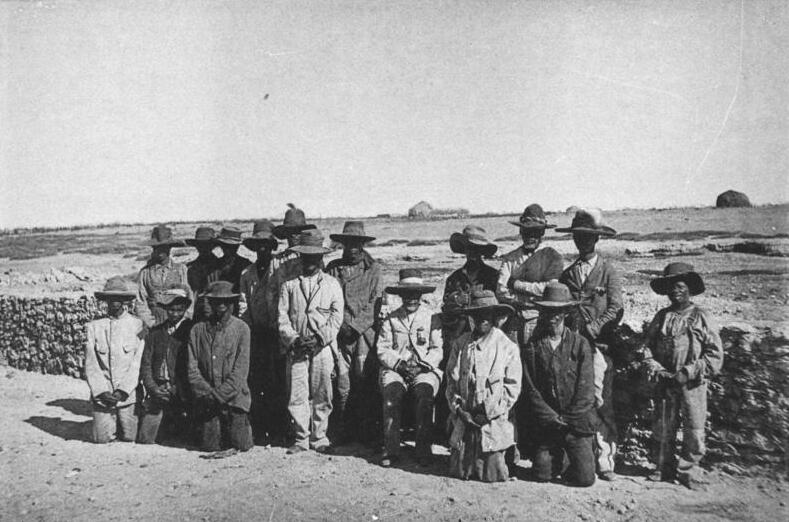
Manasse ǃNoreseb (seated in the centre) with clan elders, Hoachanas 1897

In 1902 Imperial Germany confirmed Hoachanas as the home area of the Red Nation and created a reserve of 50,000 hectares (120,000 acres). When the Herero and Nama War broke out in which the Germans attacked the indigenous Herero and Nama in their colonial territory, Manasse ǃNoreseb and Hendrik Witbooi ceased their hostilities and fought together against the Schutztruppe ("protection force", the unit deployed to the German colony). Manasse, with only 100 armed men, took over the defense of the central eastern area of Aranos, Leonardville, Aminuis, and Hoachanas.

The German Empire's Schutztruppe defeated both the Nama and the Herero during this war. Namas were displaced all over the country, and even deported to the German colonies of Togoland and Kamerun. The ethnical structures of the Nama people were destroyed, and Hoachanas lost its importance as community centre. All land and livestock were confiscated by the Germans, and the Red Nation only got a new chief in 1922.

=== South African mandate period ===
In the 1950s, Hoachanas was populated by approximately 400 Nama and a number of Boers, Afrikaans-speaking white farmers. The Boers tried to have the Nama people move to their bantustan in the area of Tses and Aminuis north of Keetmanshoop. The size of the Hoachanas reserve was decreased to 14,000 hectares (35,000 acres), and an eviction order was obtained that was confirmed by the High Court in Windhoek in 1959. However, only Markus Kooper, spiritual leader of the Nama, was forced to relocate with his family to the village of Itsawisis. The rest of the Nama resisted eviction throughout the apartheid era, and Kooper also was brought back by the community.

=== Independent Namibia ===
In 1996, Government of Namibia bought the farms Blankenese and Gomchanas and integrated them into the Hoachanas area, raising its total size to 22,000 hectares (54,000 acres).

== People from Hoachanas ==
- Katrina Hanse-Himarwa (1967–2024), politician and government minister, was born in Hoachanas.
