= Kokerboom–Auas High Voltage Power Line =

High voltage electricity transmission line in Namibia

Location
- Country: Namibia
- Coordinates: 25°59′09″S 18°08′11″E
- General direction: South to North
- From: Kokerboom substation, Namibia
- Passes through: Mariental, Kalkrand
- To: Auas substation

Ownership information
- Owner: Government of Namibia
- Operator: NamPower

Construction information
- Contractors: Power Line Africa
- Construction started: 2021
- Expected: Commissioning 2024

Technical information
- Current type: AC
- Total length: 500 km (310 mi)
- AC voltage: 400 kV
- No. of circuits: 1

The Kokerboom–Auas High Voltage Power Line, is a high voltage electricity power line, under construction in Namibia. It is expected to connect the high voltage Kokerboom substation northeast of Keetmanshoop in the ǁKaras Region to the Auas substation near Dordabis, in the Khomas Region.

== Location ==
The 400 kV power line starts at the NamPower 400kV Kokerboom substation 25 kilometres (16 mi) northeast of Keetmanshoop, the capital of Namibia's ǁKaras Region, on the M29 gravel road to Koës. The power line travels in a general northerly direction to end at the 400kV Auas substation, also owned by NamPower, located 7 kilometres (4 mi) from where the C23 to Dordabis turns off the B6 east of Windhoek, in the Khomas Region of Namibia.

The power line passes through three Namibian regions; ǁKaras Region, Hardap Region and Khomas Region. Its planned length is estimated to be around 500 kilometres (311 mi).

== Overview ==
The power line is being developed as part of plans to improve power delivery, reliability and stability of the Namibian electricity grid. This will ensure the safe and reliable importation of power from the South African utility, Eskom. In the future, when NamPower has excess electricity to sell to the Southern African Power Pool, this transmission line ensures, an efficient means of transporting that power to South Africa and to its final destination. In addition, Namibia being a large country, with urban centres sparsely spaced out, the transmission of power at these high voltages, reduces technical losses over those long distances.

== History ==
In 1981, a 220kV line served as the main backbone of the Namibian electricity grid and the means by which the country imported power from neighboring South Africa. Circa 1999, a single circuit 400kV transmission line was strung between the substation in Aries, South Africa to Auas outside Windhoek in Namibia to meet demand and stabilize the network.

It is anticipated that by 2023, that network will be insufficient to meet Namibia's expanding electricity needs. A new 400kV single circuit power line between Kokerboom and Auas is in the processes of development, to "ensure system reliability" and provide increased demand and expanded area of coverage.

== Associated power lines ==
The current Engineering, Procurement and Construction (EPC) contract awarded to Power Line Africa (Pty), a Namibian company, includes the design and construction of a connecting transmission line between Auas and the Gerus substation near Otjiwarongo, a distance of about 287 kilometres (178 mi).

== Construction ==
Power Line Africa (Pty), a local company is the main contractor on this project, at a reported cost of N$660 million (US$45.5 million). Construction was expected to begin in 2021 and last approximately 2 years. Delays in funding caused an interruption of the construction, which was resumed in 2025. The estimated cost had by then increased to N$2 billion.

== See also ==
- Energy in Namibia
- List of power stations in Namibia
