= C23 road (Namibia) =

Secondary route in Namibia

C23 road

Major junctions
- South-east end: C20 near Leonardville
- C25 near Blumfelde; C15 at Dordabis
- North-west end: B6 near Hosea Kutako International Airport

Location
- Country: Namibia

Highway system
- Transport in Namibia
← C22	→ C24

C23 is a secondary route in Namibia that runs from Leonardville to the B6 between Windhoek and Hosea Kutako International Airport via Dordabis. It is 214 kilometres (133 mi) long.
