= C31 road (Namibia) =

Secondary route in Namibia

C31 road

Major junctions
- North-East end: C29 near Summerdown, Omaheke
- C30 at Hochfeld
- South-West end: B1 Okahandja, to join B2 Okahandja

Location
- Country: Namibia

Highway system
- Transport in Namibia
← C30	→ C32

The C31 is a secondary route in Namibia that runs 196 kilometres (122 mi) from Okahandja via Hochfeld to Otjinene. It branches off the B1 8 kilometres (5.0 mi) north of Okahandja and terminates at the junction with the C29 at Summerdown. The B2 road can be accessed from the B1, a few miles from the C31 junction.
