= Manasse ǃNoreseb =

19th-century Namibian leader

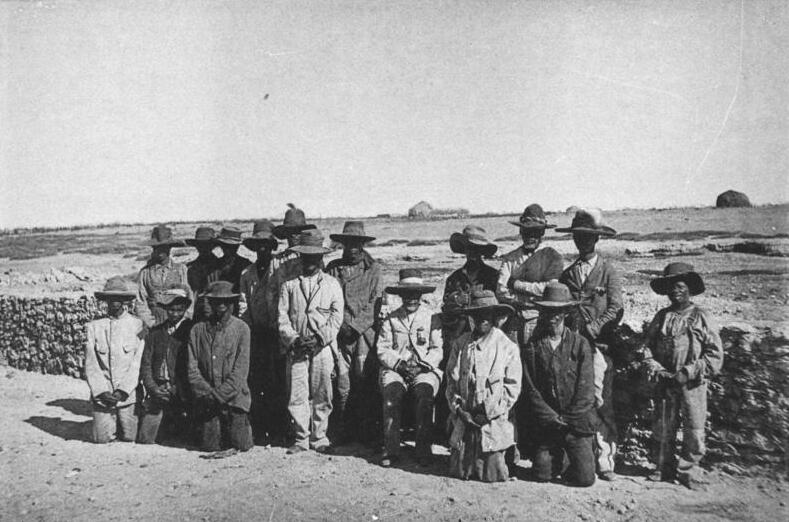
Manasse ǃNoreseb (seated in the centre) with clan elders, Hoachanas 1897

Manasse ǃNoreseb Gamab (also Manasse of Hoachanas, circa 1840–1 December 1905) was the thirteenth Kaptein of the Khaiǁkhaun (Red Nation), a subtribe of the Nama people in Namibia, between 1880 and 1905. At the start of Imperial Germany's colonisation of South-West Africa, Manasse was one of the most powerful leaders in the area.

== Early life and ascendance to chieftaincy ==
Manasse was the son of chief Gameb ǁNanimab and his wife Gamis. He was baptised at the mission station of Hoachanas in 1860 and married a Christian convert. When he was expelled from church in 1864 he also left his wife. Manasse then took a second wife and lived with the San people in the area of Hoachanas.

When chief ǂGoraxab ǁOasib (Barnabas) died in 1871, Manasse ǃNoreseb declared his candidacy to succeed him. Due to earlier conflict the missionaries at Hoachanas prevented him from becoming chief and installed ǀGâberob ǂGoraxamab (Petrus) in his place. When Petrus died in the Battle of Otjikango in the Herero–Nama War of 1880, Manasse again attempted to gain chieftaincy of the Khaiǁkhaun and succeeded. According to oral evidence, Manasse ǃNoreseb gave the order, or at least did not object to, the killing of Petrus.

== Hostilities among the Nama tribes ==
From the start of his chieftaincy, Manasse ǃNoreseb had the powerful Hendrik Witbooi, leader of the ǀKhowesin (Witbooi Nama), as enemy. In 1882 he therefore signed a peace treaty with the Ovaherero under Maharero, staunch enemies of Witbooi. Chiefs Hendrik Windstaan of the ǁOgain (Groot Doden) and Jakobus Isaak of the ǀHaiǀkhauan (Berseba Orlam) also joined this treaty. In 1885, Manasse ǃNoreseb signed a peace treaty with the German Empire which had in 1884 established the colony of German South-West Africa.

Fearing an attack by Witbooi he fled Hoachanas in 1889 and settled at Seeis, which was situated in an area under the control of Maharero. After Witbooi's troops were defeated by the Germans in 1894, Manasse returned to Hoachanas in 1895.

Witbooi attacked Hoachanas several times and broke the resistance of the Khaiǁkhaun. He installed a rival chief, ǃHoeb ǁOasemab (Fritz Lazarus ǁOaseb) and confiscated the land of the Red Nation. Heinrich Vedder opined that Witbooi's intention was to defeat the Nama tribes one by one, lease the land back to them after he conquered it, and gain the position of a Nama Paramount Chief in the process. The German protection treaty did not help Manasse ǃNoreseb; the Germans never had the intention to help single parties within the same tribe. They created a reserve at Hoachanas in 1902 and thereby confirmed the settlement as the home village of the Red Nation. By that time, however, the hostilities between the Nama clans had already severely weakened the position of the indigenous people in southern central Namibia against the German colonisers.

== Herero–Nama War of 1904–1907 ==
When the Herero and Nama War broke out between the German Empire and the indigenous Herero and Nama in German South-West Africa, Manasse ǃNoreseb and Hendrik Witbooi ceased their hostilities and fought together against the Schutztruppe ("protection force", the unit deployed to the German colony). Manasse, with only 100 armed men, took over the defence of the central eastern area of Aranos, Leonardville, Aminuis, and Hoachanas.

Witbooi, by then in his seventies, died in action on 29 May 1905 near Vaalgras, Manasse ǃNoreseb fell on 1 December 1905 at the Battle of ǃGu-ǃoms near Aminuis. Both are regarded heroes of the struggle against colonisation in Namibia.

The German Empire's Schutztruppe defeated both the Nama and the Herero during this war. Survivors were detained in concentration camps, much the same way as the British had set up camps for forced labour in their colony of South Africa, during the Anglo-Boer War of 1899–1902. Thousands of people, including women and children, died in these concentration camps from illness, neglect, and malnutrition. This extermination of Herero and Nama has been described as genocide.

After the defeat in the war, Namas were displaced all over the country, and even deported to the German colonies of Togoland and Kamerun. Thus the ethnical structures of the Nama people were destroyed; the Red Nation only got a new chief in 1922. It was Fritz Lazarus ǁOaseb, the one–time rival of Manasse installed by Witbooi. According to oral evidence, Manasse's head was cut off after he fell, the flesh was removed by cooking, and the skull was sent to Germany for research on racial superiority. When his remains were dug up in 1999 for reburial in Hoachanas, the skull was missing from the corpse.
