= C24 =

C24 may refer to:

== Vehicles ==
Aircraft

- Caspar C 24, a German sport plane
- Castel C-24, a French training glider
- Cierva C.24, a British autogyro
- Douglas C-24, an American military transport
- Fairchild C-24, an American military transport
- IVL C.24, a Finnish fighter aircraft

Automobiles

- Sauber C24, a Swiss Formula One car

Ships

- HMS C24, a C-class submarine of the Royal Navy
- HMS Sheffield (C24), a Town-class cruiser of the Royal Navy

== Other uses ==
- C24 Gallery, an art gallery in New York City
- C24 road (Namibia)
- Bishop's Opening, a chess opening
- Caldwell 24, a Seyfert galaxy
- Classical 24, an American syndicated radio service
- Gallbladder cancer
- Special Committee on Decolonization of the United Nations

== See also ==
- List of compounds with carbon number 24
