= C29 =

C29 or C-29 may refer to:

== Vehicles ==
Aircraft

- British Aerospace C-29, a military navigation trainer
- Caspar C 29, a German floatplane
- Cierva C.29, a British autogyro
- Douglas C-29 Dolphin, an American military amphibious flying boat
- Fiat C.29, an Italian racing seaplane

Automobiles

- Sauber C29, a Swiss Formula One car

Ships

- HMS C29, a C-class submarine of the Royal Navy

== Science and technology ==
- C29, the next release for the C programming language

== Other uses ==
- C29 road (Namibia)
- Caldwell 29, a spiral galaxy
- Middleton Municipal Airport, in Dane County, Wisconsin
- Vienna Gambit, a chess opening
