= Stock theft in Namibia =

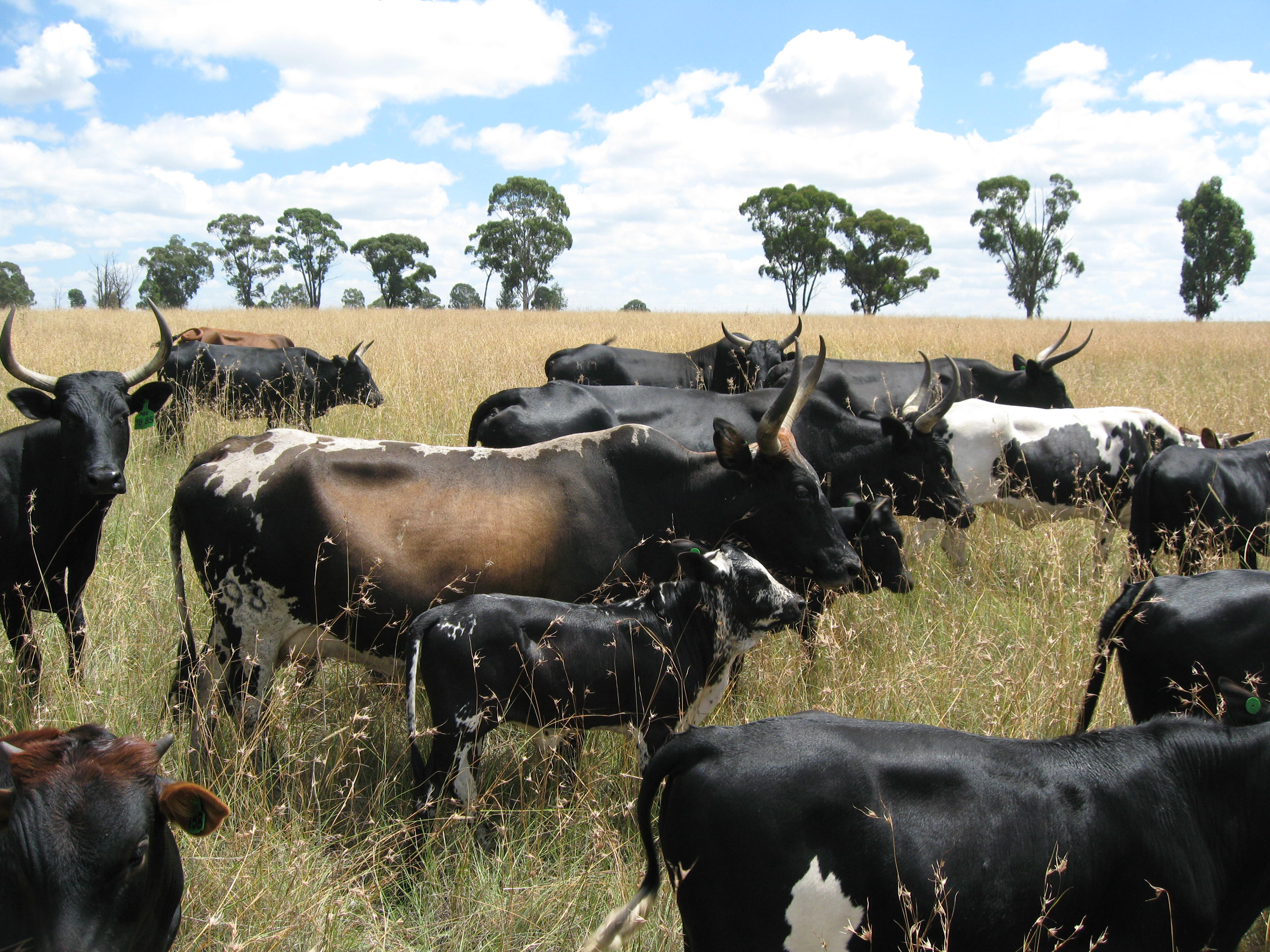
Nguni Cow Herd (Otjozondjupa Region)

Stock theft in Namibia is a prevalent crime. Animals are slaughtered for human consumption or sold at auctions for monetary gain.

== Legal environment ==
The relevant legislation is the Stock Theft Act. This act was amended in 2004 such that it prescribes long jail terms, even for first-time offenders: Theft of livestock over the value of 500N$ (e.g. a goat or a sheep) since then carries a minimum of 20 years in jail, and a minimum of 30 years for repeat offenders. Livestock valued at less than 500N$ (e.g. a chicken) carries a mandatory jail sentence of 2 years.

In a 2011 case before the High Court, two such 20-year jail term convictions were reduced to five years, and the mandatory jail terms declared unconstitutional. An appeal against this judgement is with the Supreme Court.

== Prevention ==
Otjiwarongo members of the Namibian Police (NAMPOL) and the nearby farmers in the Otjozondjupa Region have struggled to check the increase in stock thefts in the area. Otjozundjupa Regional Police Commissioner Joseph Anghuwo has described stock theft in the region as a big tough thing to farmers as well as to the police in large. Based on the statistics given by Nampol sixty-eight cases of stock theft were reported while the police dealt with 10 cases of illegal hunting during the period from January–March 2012. Joseph Anghuwo have also pointed out that upon taking up the office in 2007, it was decided to organize communal and commercial farmers in the region which led to the creation of a farmers association, which went on to become a crime prevention forum.

== Motives ==
According to Anghuwo suspects have identified the following as the main reason why the attempted to steal:

- Some of the suspects arrested due to cattle theft have claim that that is the only way they can put something on the table for themselves and families.
- Due to the fact that Namibia have a high unemployment rate, It has forced people to steal.

== Impact ==
Commercial and communal farmers throughout Namibia have suffered losses of at least N$600,000 due to stock theft in 2009, when 101 head of cattle, 93 sheep and 151 goats had been either stolen or slaughtered from January to July. It was highlighted that most of the animals theft are done by people between the age of 16 years to 24 years. There is a supposed syndicate of stock thieves operating in the area of Seeis, Steinhausen and Hochfeld, mainly using assegais to kill cattle.
