= C20 road (Namibia) =

Secondary route in Namibia

C20 road

Major junctions
- South end: B1 near Mariental
- C15 at Stampriet; C22 near Aranos; C25 at Leonardville
- North end: B6 at Gobabis

Location
- Country: Namibia

Highway system
- Transport in Namibia
← C19	→ C21

The C20 is a tarred highway in southern Namibia. It starts north of Mariental and ends in Gobabis. The highway is 320 kilometres (200 mi) long. The road travels eastwards past Stampriet to the C25 near Aranos and then north via Leonardville to Gobabis.
