= Omatako =

Omatako may refer to the following places and jurisdictions in central Namibia:

- Omatako Constituency
- Omatako Mountains
- Omatako Dam
