= Windhoek Rural =

Electoral constituency in the Khomas region of central Namibia

Coordinates: 22°34′S 17°6′E

Windhoek Rural constituency (red) comprises rural Khomas Region minus the city of Windhoek

Windhoek Rural is a constituency in the Khomas Region of Namibia. Its district capital is the settlement of Groot Aub. It had a population of 22,254 in 2011, up from 20,212 in 2001. As of 2020, it has 13,625 registered voters.

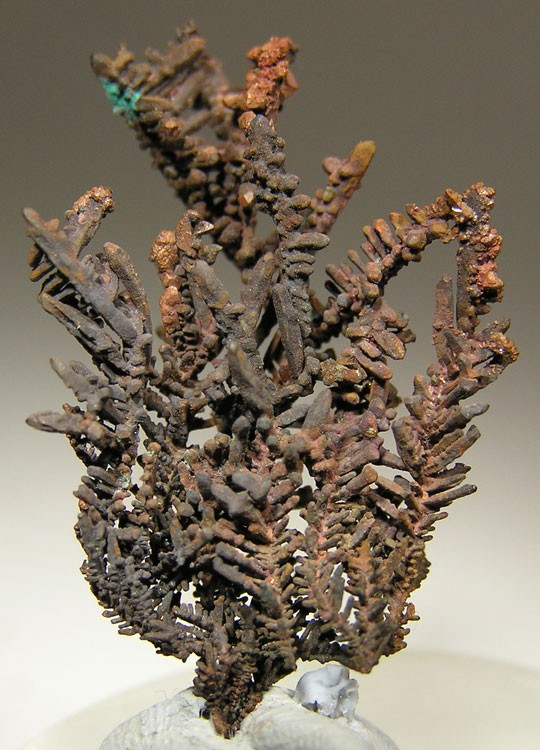
Copper specimen from Ogonja Mine, Seeis, Windhoek Rural

Windhoek Rural contains all settlements in the Khomas Region that are outside the city of Windhoek, among them:

- Aris
- Baumgartsbrunn
- Brakwater
- Dordabis
- Mix camp
- Nauchas
- Nina
- Seeis
- Solitaire

The main economic activity in this constituency is farming and related work like gardening, seed production, and firewood collection; 90% of the area consists of commercial farms.

== Politics ==
The 2004 regional election was won by Frederick Arie of the SWAPO Party who took over from Albert Tsuoub of the Democratic Turnhalle Alliance (DTA). Arie received 2,092 of the 4,509 votes cast.

The 2015 regional election were also won by SWAPO whose Penina Ita gained 2,372 votes. Willem Hendrik Vries of the Democratic Turnhalle Alliance (DTA) came second with 848 votes, followed by Bernard Gaoseb of the Republican Party (RP) with 415 votes.

The 2020 regional election was narrowly won by Piet Adams of the Landless People's Movement (LPM, a new party registered in 2018). He obtained 1,645 votes, followed by Johannes Elago (SWAPO) with 1,563 votes. Magdalena Haukelo of the Independent Patriots for Change (IPC), an opposition party formed in August 2020, came in third with 1,099 votes, followed by Marthineo Dierkse of the Popular Democratic Movement (PDM, the new name of the DTA) with 714 votes.
