= C30 road (Namibia) =

Secondary road in Namibia

C30 road

Major junctions
- Southeast end: B6 west of Gobabis
- C29 Steinhausen; C31 Hochfeld
- Northwest end: C22 southeast of Otjiwarongo

Location
- Country: Namibia

Highway system
- Transport in Namibia
← C29	→ C31

The C30 is an untarred road in central Namibia, leading from Gobabis via Steinhausen and Hochfeld to the C22 southeast of Otjiwarongo. It is 325 kilometres (202 mi) long.
