= Aris, Namibia =

Settlement in central Namibia

Coordinates: 22°45′14″S 17°8′10″E

Aris is a farmstead and settlement in the Khomas Region of central Namibia, situated on the B1 approximately 25 kilometres (16 mi) south of the capital Windhoek. The settlement is known for its two quarries, featuring several endemic minerals found nowhere else on Earth. Arisite is named for the Aris settlement, and Windhoekite is named for the nearby capital.

== History ==
Aris was a settlement already before the German colonial occupation of South West Africa. The trader and blacksmith Francis James Bassingthwaighte lived here in the late 19th century. In 1914, the road from Windhoek via Aris to Rehoboth was proclaimed. A post office was opened in 1907, and the railway line connecting it to Windhoek and Keetmanshoop was opened in 1912.

Upon Independence of Namibia Aris was a village, governed by a seven-seat village council. The 1992 Namibian local elections was contested only by the opposition Democratic Turnhalle Alliance (DTA), and all seven of its candidates were duly elected. The village status of Aris was revoked before the 1998 local authority elections, so that it came under the governance of the Khomas Regional Council. Since Windhoek's land area was vastly expanded in 2011, Aris belongs to the capital. Aris belongs to the Windhoek Rural electoral constituency.

== Geography and geology ==
Aris is situated in the Auas Mountains 25 kilometres (16 mi) south of Windhoek on the national road B1. Aris railway station is a stop on the Windhoek–Keetmanshoop railway line.

Due to the occurrence of Thorium and Uranium in the Aris phonolites, radioactivity is elevated in the vicinity.

=== Aris quarries ===
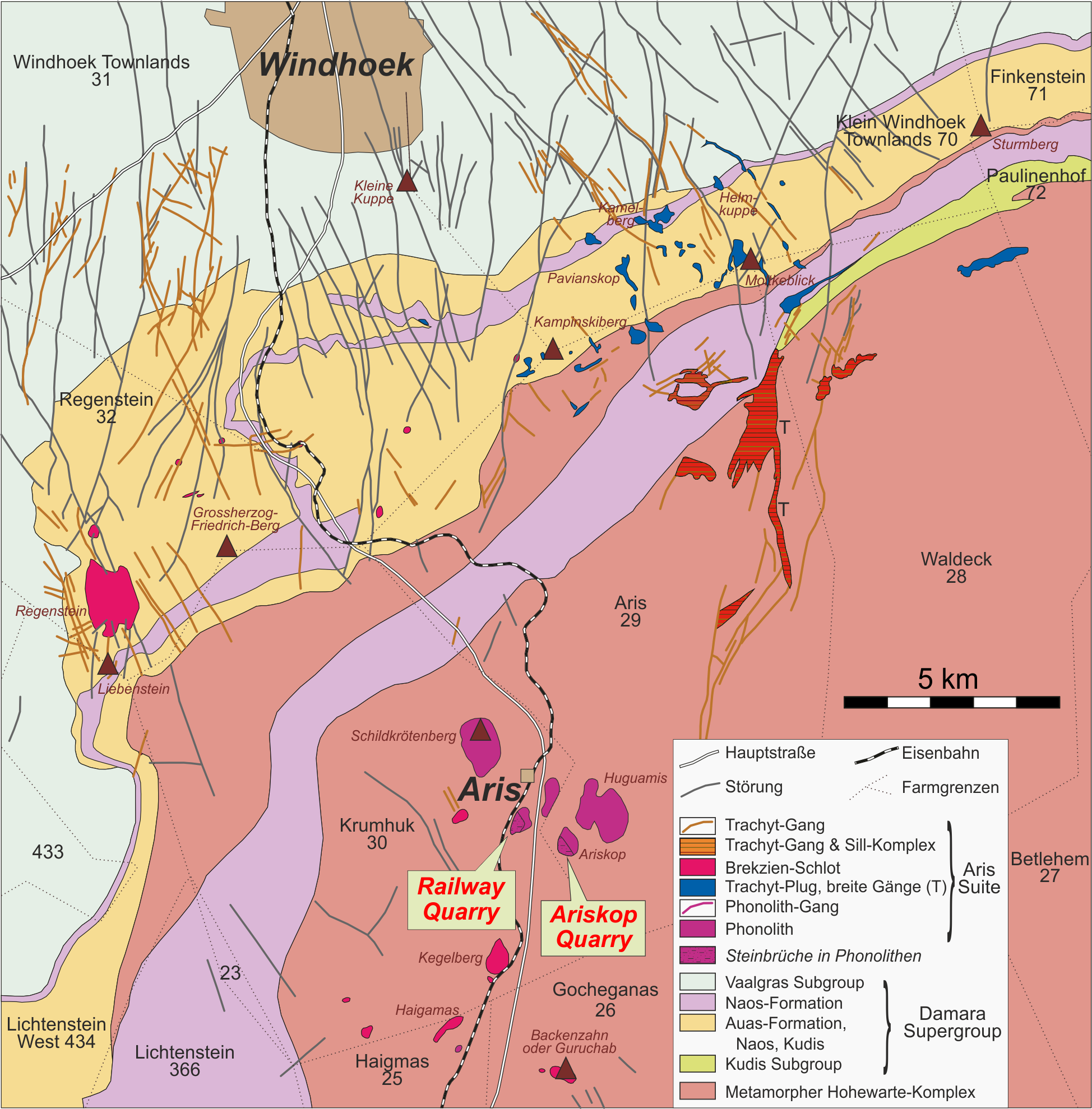
Geological map of Aris and its environment

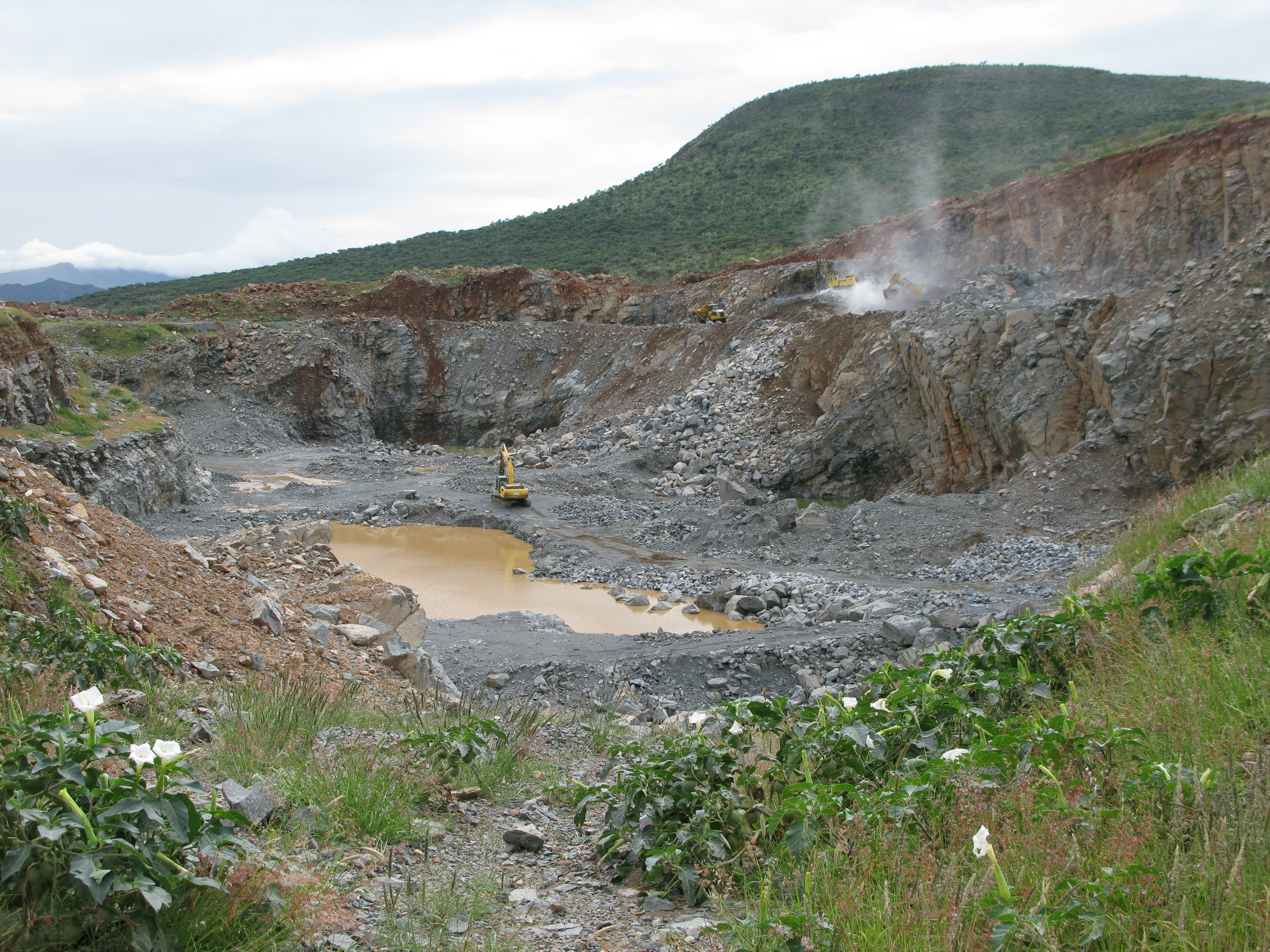
Ariskop phonolite quarry

Aris is situated near two quarries, the Ariskop quarry on the Ariskop hill, and the Railway Quarry near the Windhoek-Nakop railway line. Together, they are known as the Aris Quarries. In both quarries, phonolite is mined as surfacing aggregate for road construction.

The Aris Quarries are also the type locality for an array of rare minerals, including Arisite-(Ce) (NaCe_{2}(CO_{3})_{2}[F_{2x}(CO_{3})_{1-x}]F), Sazhinite-(La) (Na_{3}La[Si_{6}O_{15}]·2H_{2}O), Windhoekite (Ca_{2}Fe_{2,67}^{3+}[Si_{8}O_{20}](OH)_{4}·10H_{2}O), Arisite-(La) (NaLa_{2}(CO_{3})_{2}[F_{2x}(CO_{3})_{1-x}]F), Ellingsenite (Na_{5}Ca_{6}Si_{18}O_{38}(OH)_{13}·6H_{2}O), Escheite (Ca_{2}NaMnTi_{5}[Si_{12}O_{34}]O_{2}(OH)_{3}·12H_{2}O). The latter three minerals have been found at no other place worldwide.

Minerals from the Aris Quarries

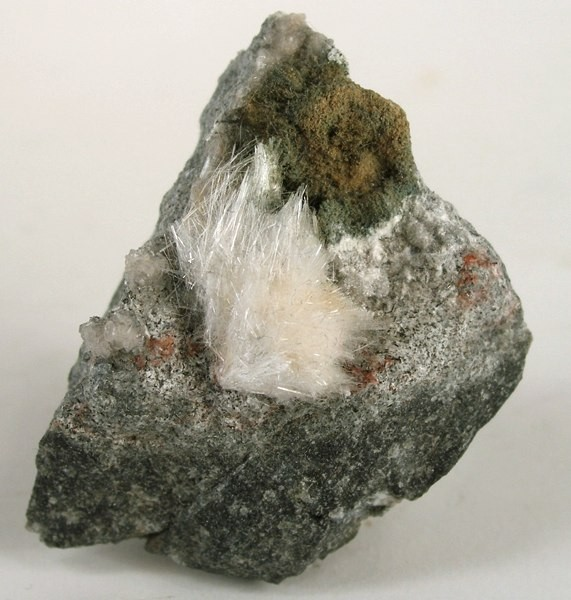
Makatite

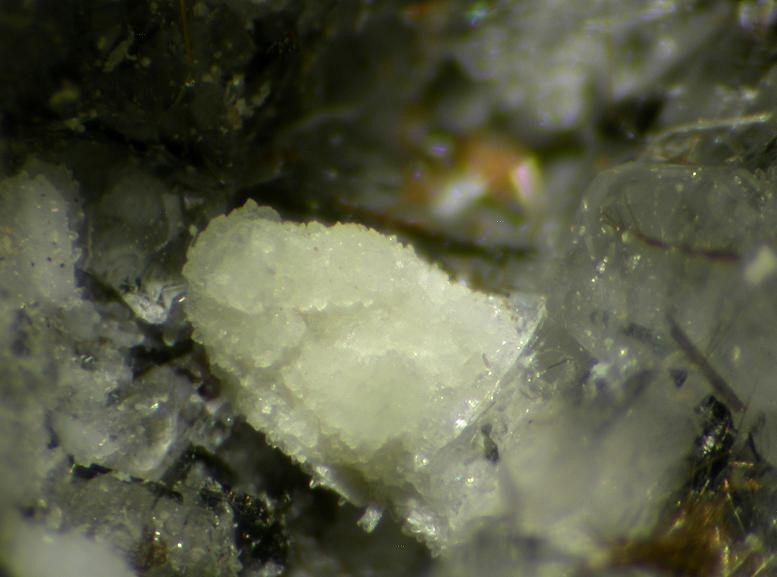
Sazhinite-(La)

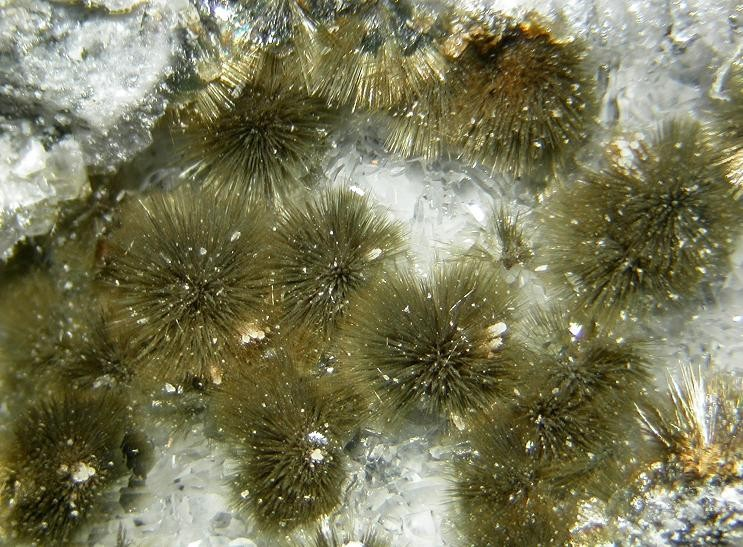
Green Tuperssuatsiaite

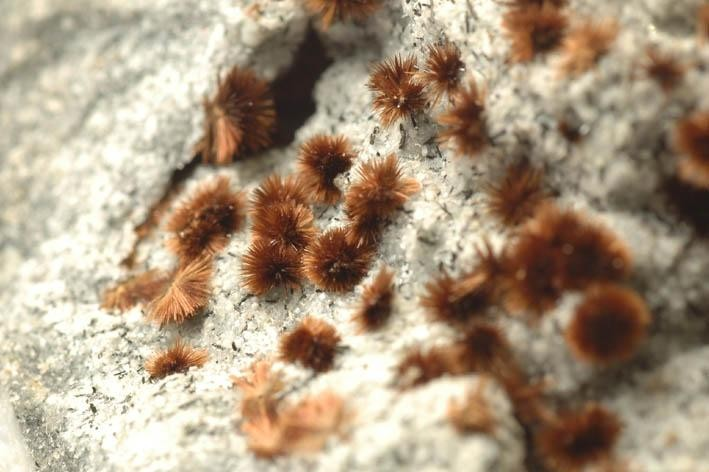
Brown Tuperssuatsiaite

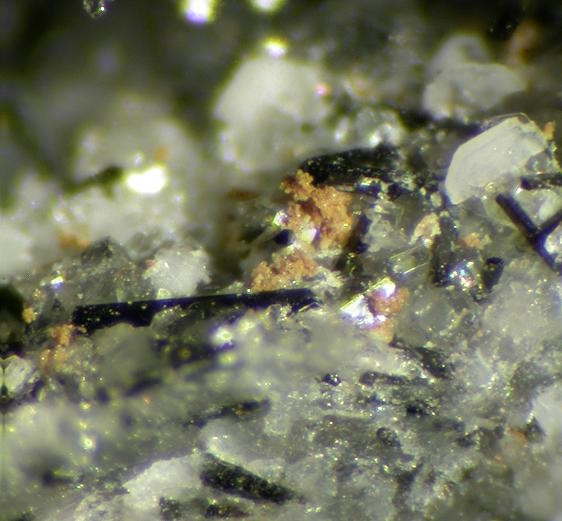
Fe-Analogon of Zakharovite

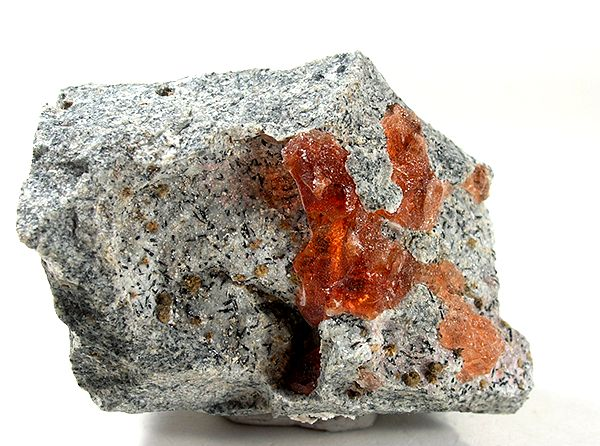
Villiaumite

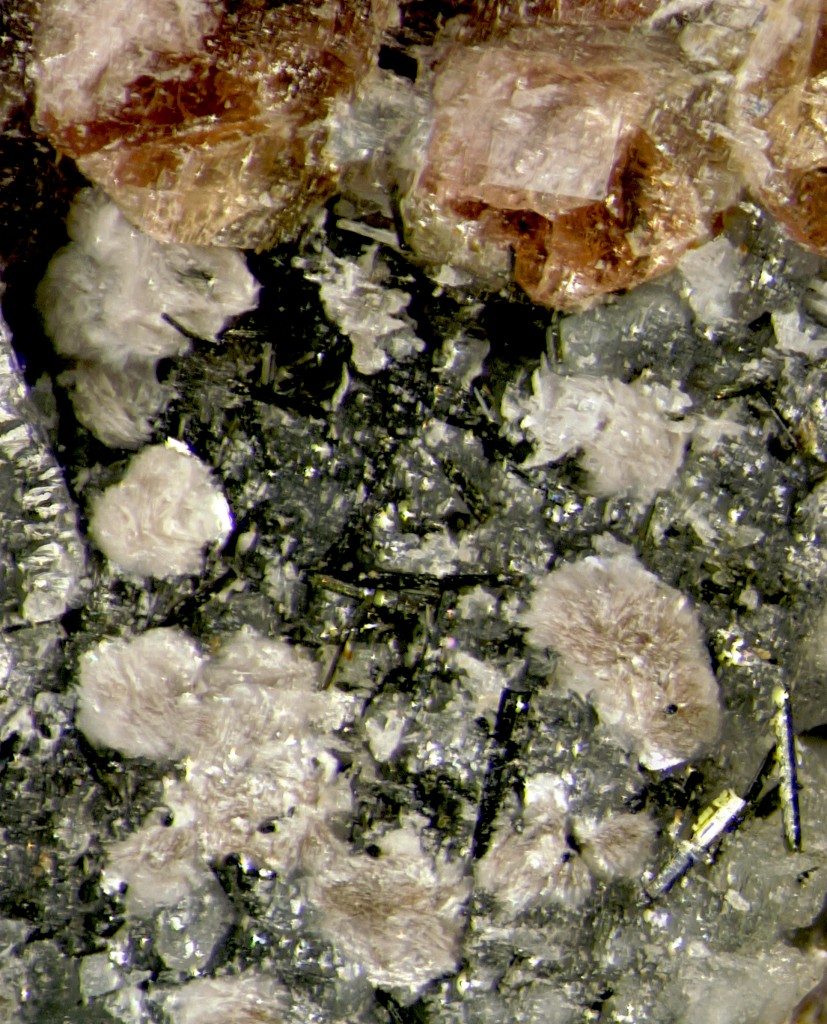
Arisite-(Ce)

== Economy and infrastructure ==
Due to its local two quarries, Aris has several small factories, including a stone crushing plant, a brick maker, and an oil and tyre recycling company. The settlement is home to Aris Primary School (formerly: Aris Grundschule) which had 170 learners in 2019.

The private Aris Agricultural Training Centre was founded in 2009 by the owners of nearby farm Krumhuk. It occupied the old hotel and closed in 2016 due to lack of funds.
