= Aranos Constituency =

Electoral constituency in Namibia

Aranos constituency (red) in the Hardap Region

Aranos Constituency is an electoral constituency in the Hardap Region of Namibia. It was created in August 2013, following a recommendation of the Fourth Delimitation Commission of Namibia, and in preparation of the 2014 general election. Aranos constituency was formed from the eastern part of Mariental Rural constituency.

Aranos constituency covers an area of 26,724 km^{2} (10,318 sq mi). It had a population of 10,722 in 2023. The administrative centre of Aranos Constituency is the town of Aranos. As of 2020 the constituency had 5,604 registered voters.

== Politics ==
In the 2015 regional elections Jan Jarson of Swapo won the constituency with 1,278 votes, followed by Dawid Gaweseb of the Rally for Democracy and Progress (RDP, 613 votes) and Rehabeam Katjijova of the Democratic Turnhalle Alliance (DTA, 384 votes). The 2020 regional election was won by Salomon Henry Boois of the Landless People's Movement (LPM, a new party registered in 2018). He obtained 1,518 votes. The SWAPO candidate, Lukas Veldskoen, came second with 781 votes, followed by Elden Elvis Kuhanga of the Independent Patriots for Change (IPC, an opposition party formed in August 2020) who obtained 579 votes.

== See also ==
- Administrative divisions of Namibia
