= C25 road (Namibia) =

Secondary route in Namibia

C25 road

Major junctions
- East end: C23 near Leonardville
- West end: B1 Rehoboth

Location
- Country: Namibia

Highway system
- Transport in Namibia
← C24	→ C26

C25 is a secondary route in Namibia that runs from the northern B1 junction in Rehoboth to the border between Hardap Region and Omaheke Region near Leonardville, joining the C23. It is 164 kilometres (102 mi) long.
