= Aranos Reformed Church =

Congregation of the Reformed Church in Namibia

The Aranos Reformed Church was a congregation of the Reformed Churches in South Africa (GKSA) in Aranos in eastern Namibia. It left the denomination in 2016. With 16 confirmed and five baptized members at the end of 2014, it was the second smallest Reformed Church in Namibia, after the Karasburg Reformed Church, which had 12 confirmed and two baptized members. In 2015, the Aranos congregation grew to 19 confirmed and six baptized members.

== Sources ==
- (af) Harris, C.T., Noëth, J.G., Sarkady, N.G., Schutte, F.M. en Van Tonder, J.M. 2010. Van seringboom tot kerkgebou: die argitektoniese erfenis van die Gereformeerde Kerke. Potchefstroom: Administratiewe Buro.
- (en) Potgieter, D.J. (chief ed.) Standard Encyclopaedia of Southern Africa. Cape Town: Nasionale Opvoedkundige Uitgewery Ltd., 1973.
- (en) Raper, P.E. 1987. Dictionary of South African Place Names. Johannesburg: Lowry Publishers.
- (af) Schalekamp, Dm. M.E. (chairman: edition commission). 2001. Die Almanak van die Gereformeerde Kerke in Suid-Afrika vir die jaar 2002. Potchefstroom: Administratiewe Buro.
- (af) Van der Walt, Dr. S.J. (chairman: almanac deputies). 1997. Die Almanak van die Gereformeerde Kerke in Suid-Afrika vir die jaar 1998. Potchefstroom: Administratiewe Buro.
- (af) Venter, Dm. A.A. (chief ed.) 1957. Almanak van die Gereformeerde Kerk in Suid-Afrika vir die jaar 1958. Potchefstroom: Administratiewe Buro.
- (af) Venter, Dm. A.A. (chief ed.) 1958. Almanak van die Gereformeerde Kerk in Suid-Afrika vir die jaar 1959. Potchefstroom: Administratiewe Buro.
- (af) Vogel, Willem (ed.). 2014. Die Almanak van die Gereformeerde Kerke in Suid-Afrika vir die jaar 2015. Potchefstroom: Administratiewe Buro.

24.1401°S 19.1179°E
