= Esme Sophia Isaack =

Namibian politician

- Born: 30 May 1967 (age 59); Mariental
- Citizenship: Namibian
- Education: Diploma
- Alma mater: University of Namibia
- Occupations: Teacher, Politician
- Title: Governor of Hardap Region
- Term: 5 years

Esme Sophia Isaack (born 30 May 1967 at Mariental) is a Namibian politician who served as Governor of Hardap Region from 2015 to 2020.

In 2016, she survived a car accident after the car she was travelling in hit a Toyota pick-up that was crossing.
