= Andreas Lambert =

Captain of the Kaiǀkhauan (c. 1844–1894)

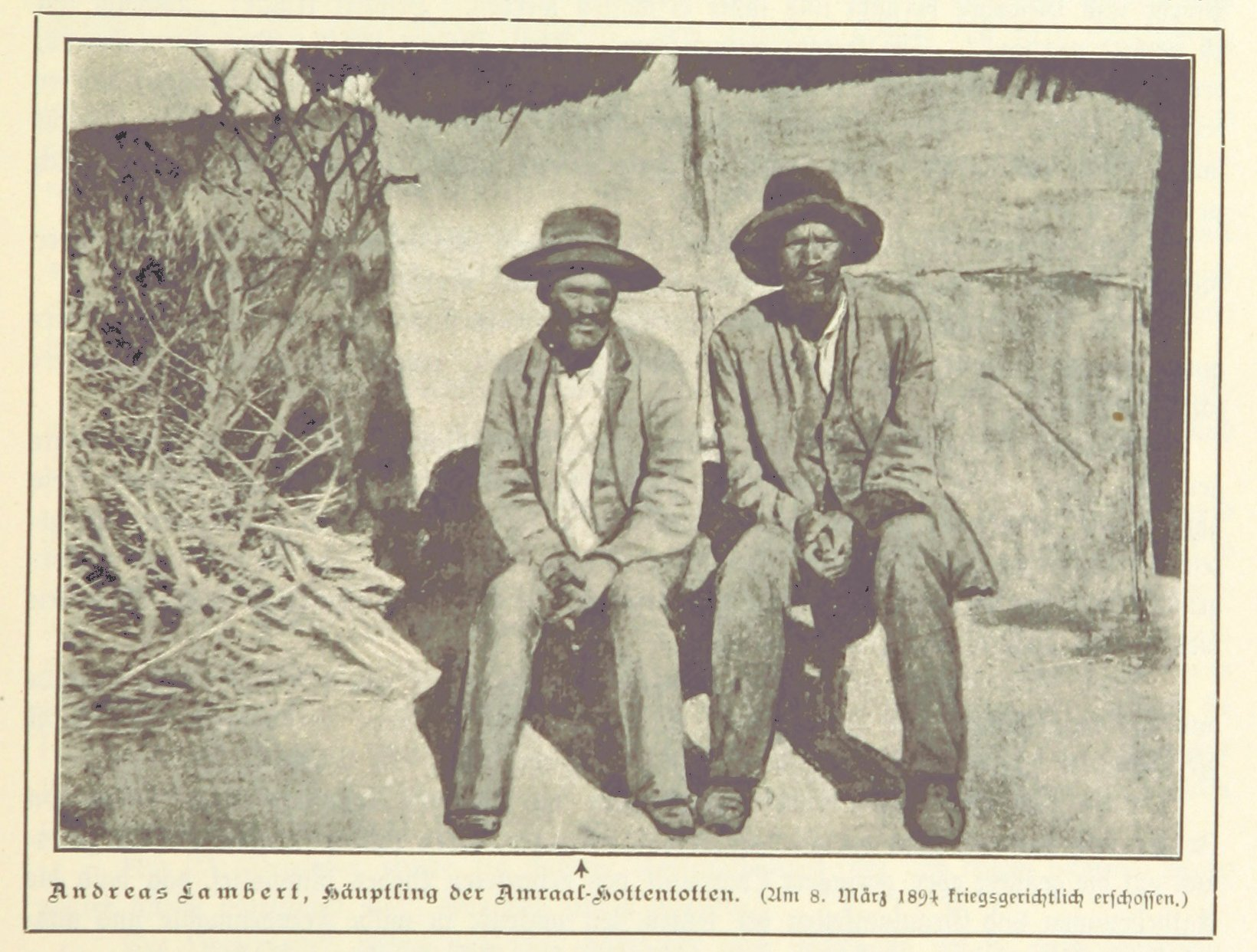
- Lambert (on left) in 1896

Captain of the Kaiǀkhauan
- Reign: 13 February 1864 – 8 March 1894
- Predecessor: Amraal Lambert
- Successor: Eduard Lambert
- Born: c. 1844
- Died: 8 March 1894 (aged 49–50); German South West Africa
- Khoekhoe language name: ǃNanib

Andreas Lambert, also known as Andries Lambert (Khoekhoe: ǃNanib; c. 1844 – 8 March 1894) was the second Captain of the Kaiǀkhauan (Khauas Nama), a subtribe of the Orlam in eastern Namibia.

In the 1860s the Kaiǀkhauan were severely weakened in their political and economic power. Their cattle died of lung disease, and smallpox befell the Nama community at Gobabis, including much of the Lambert family. After his grandfather Amraal Lambert died from this disease in 1864, Andreas took over the chieftainship from him and became the leader of the Kaiǀkhauan at the age of 20.

Under his leadership the clan regained its former fame in trade and cattle theft. He opposed the settlement of South African farmers, threatening to chase them away by force. Those Trekboere were in search of political independence from British occupation of the Cape Colony and had ventured into his community's area during their Dorsland Trek. Lambert also won a battle against a Tswana regiment around 1884, using his advantage of having firearms and horses. From that time on the Kaiǀkhauan controlled important trade routes, waylaying and robbing trade treks, and were considered a very powerful and dangerous force in Damaraland and Namaland. Andreas Lambert went as far as speaking on behalf of all Namibian people.

When Imperial Germany began to colonize South West Africa, Lambert refused to sign a "protection treaty". He was subsequently attacked by Schutztruppe soldiers under the command of Theodor Leutwein and Tswana auxiliaries. The Nama clan was defeated in their home settlement of Naosanabis (today's Leonardville) on 6 March 1894. Lambert survived the attack but was tried and executed for murder and theft two days later. This is thought to be the first execution of a Namibian traditional leader by the German colonial forces. Historical records indicate that Leutwein intended to set an example for much stronger tribes not to stand in his way.

Leutwein confiscated some of the group's land and installed Andreas' brother Eduard as chief of the Kaiǀkhauan. The surviving fighters were forced to sign the protection treaty but arose again in 1896 to fight German occupation. After Eduard died in the Battle of Gobabis, the Kaiǀkhauan clan ceased to exist as a unit; its members were taken prisoners and scattered over the country.
