= Castel C-24S =

French 1930s training glider

General information
- Type: Training glider
- National origin: France
- Manufacturer: Castel
- Number built: 1

History
- First flight: September 1936

The Castel C-24S was a training glider built in the late 1930s in France. It was a glider of high-wing monoplane configuration. In English, Castel C-24S translates to Castle C-24S. It was produced by the manufacturer Castel. Another product was built by the same manufacturer, under a similar name, which was called the Castel C-24. It was also built in the late 1930s. It can be assumed that the Castel C-24S is the successor to the Castel C-24.

== Specifications ==
General characteristics

- Crew: Two
- Length: 8.00 m (26 ft 3 in)
- Wingspan: 17.00 m (55 ft 9 in)
- Height: 2.18 m (7 ft 2 in)
- Wing area: 22.80 m^{2} (245.4 sq ft)
- Aspect ratio: 17
- Empty weight: 160 kg (353 lb)
- Gross weight: 320 kg (705 lb)

Performance
