= Mix camp =

Informal settlement in Namibia

Mix camp (also: Berghoff settlement) is an informal settlement in the greater Brakwater area in central Namibia. It is located 20 kilometres (12 mi) north of the capital Windhoek and in 2007 was inhabited by approximately 3,000 people. By 2021 it had grown to 1,454 households. Since Windhoek's land area was vastly expanded in 2011, Mix camp belongs to the capital. Mix camp belongs to the Windhoek Rural electoral constituency.

Mix camp is named after German Heiner Mix who allowed people to settle on his 50 hectares (120 acres) plot in the 1980s. After Mix' death in 1999 the settlement mushroomed because there was no landlord. In 2006 a lengthy legal and political battle started after a company owned by Secretary to Namibian Cabinet Frans Kapofi bought the plot and wanted the residents to leave. Mix residents in turn requested the government to expropriate the land.

In November 2010, two weeks before the regional elections, the government acquired the land and promised to develop the area. In the early 2020s plans to formalize and develop the settlement were made public. Among the planned improvements are the provision of water and sanitation and the establishment of a clinic and a police station.
