= C22 road (Namibia) =

Secondary route in Namibia

C22 road

Southern section
- South end: C20 near Aranos
- North end: B6 / B14 near Gobabis

Northern section
- South-east end: B14 at Okondjatu
- Major intersections: C47 at Okakarara; C30 at Ozondjache
- North-west end: B1 near Otjiwarongo

Location
- Country: Namibia

Highway system
- Transport in Namibia
← C21	→ C23

C22 is a secondary route in Namibia that exists in two discontinuous sections: a 252 kilometres (157 mi) southern section running from Aranos via Aminuis to Gobabis, and a 203 kilometres (126 mi) northern section running from Okondjatu to Otjiwarongo. The section between Gobabis and Okondjatu, formerly part of the C22, is now part of the B14.
