= Omatako Constituency =

Electoral constituency in the Otjozondjupa region of Namibia

Coordinates: 20°38′S 17°44′E

Omatako constituency (red) in the Otjozondjupa Region

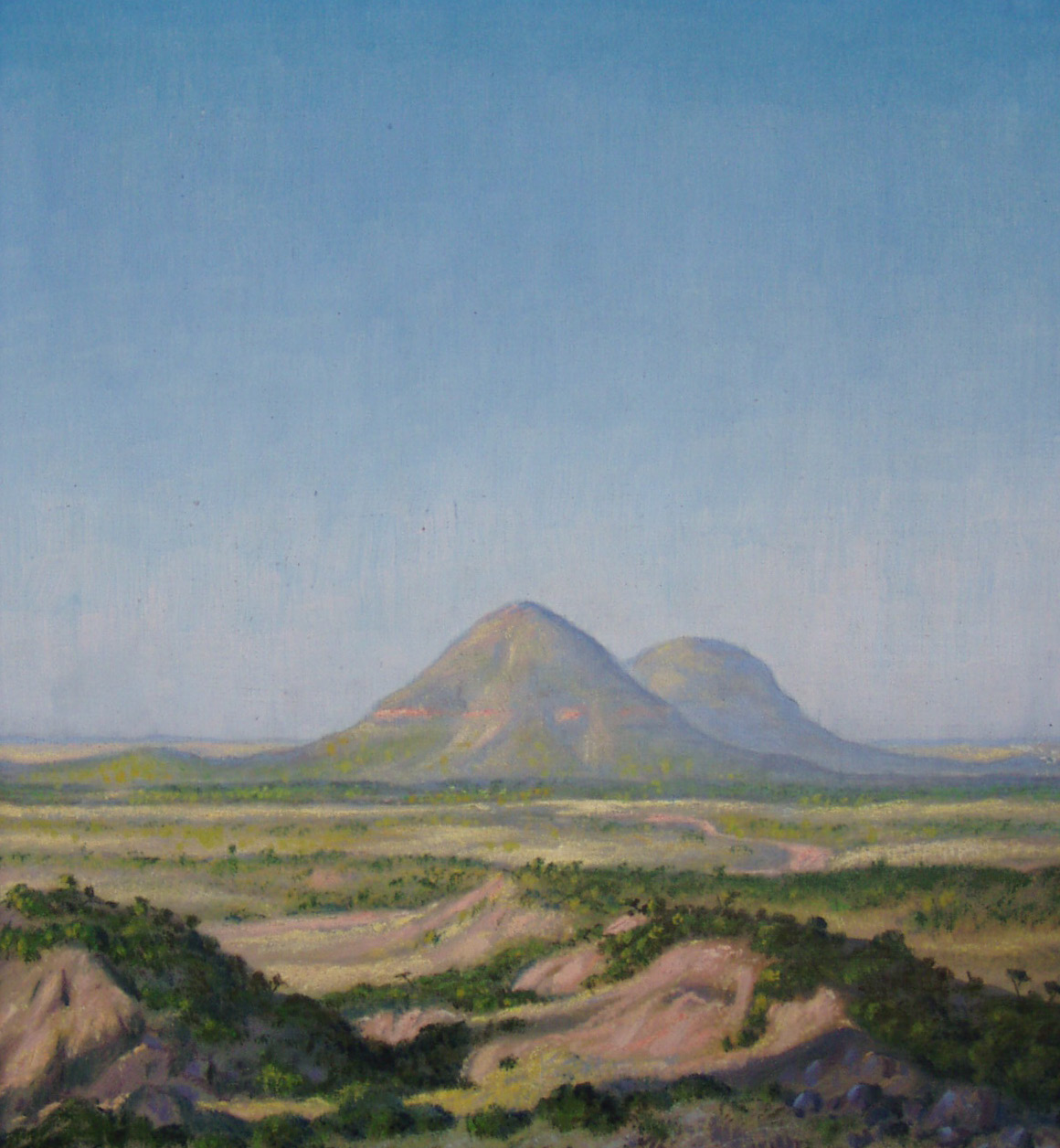
1947 oil painting of the Omatako Mountains by Helmut Lewin

Omatako Constituency is an electoral constituency in the Otjozondjupa Region of Namibia. It had 11,998 inhabitants in 2004 and 7,372 registered voters in 2020. The constituency is entirely rural with commercial farms accounting for 95% of its 24,879 square kilometres (9,606 sq mi) area. The constituency office is situated at Okandjira, the constituency's only proclaimed settlement. Other populated places are Hochfeld and Ovitoto, as well as the Osire refugee camp and the Osona military base. Omatako Constituency is named after the Omatako Mountains, a prominent geological feature of the constituency.

== Politics ==
In the 2004 regional election, South West Africa People's Organization (SWAPO) candidate Issaskar Kaunakao Kaujeua received 1,691 of the 3,244 votes cast and became councillor.

Omatako is one of only a few Namibian constituencies that changed their political vote in the 2015 regional election and opted for a non-SWAPO councillor. Israel Hukura of the National Unity Democratic Organisation (NUDO) narrowly won with 1,187 votes, beating SWAPO's candidate Susana Mutjitua Hikopua, who gained 1,144 votes. Helga Tjipe of the Democratic Turnhalle Alliance (DTA) also ran and gained 156 votes. Councillor Hukura (NUDO) was narrowly re-elected in the 2020 regional election. He received 909 votes; Moses Hikopua (SWAPO) obtained 875.
