= Groot Aub =

Groot Aub Groß Aub
- Settlement annexed to Windhoek
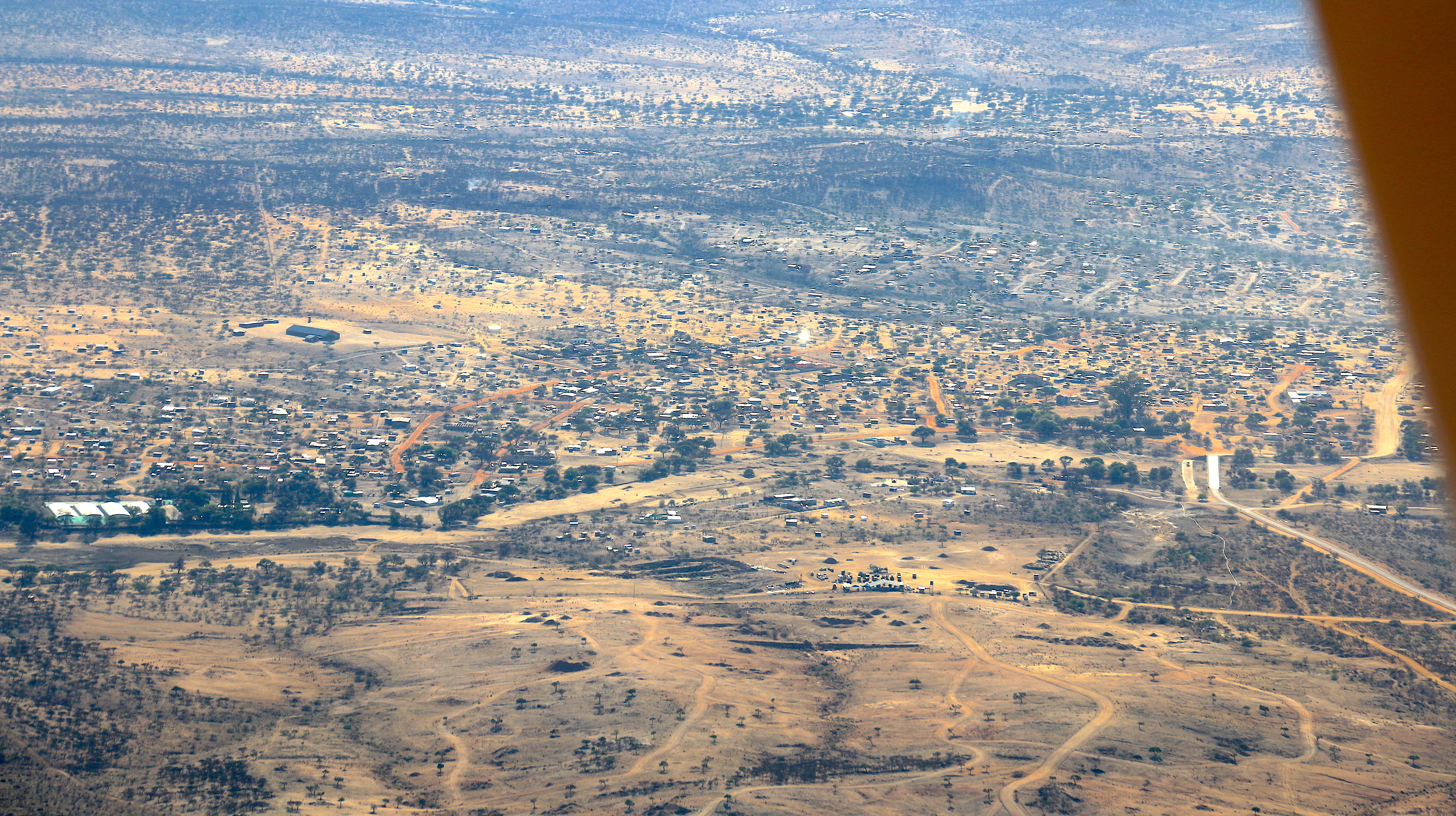
- View over Groot Aub towards the East

- Location in Namibia
- Coordinates: 22.943258°S 17.203066°E
- Country: Namibia
- Region: Khomas Region
- Constituency: Windhoek Rural
- Time zone: UTC+2 (South African Standard Time)

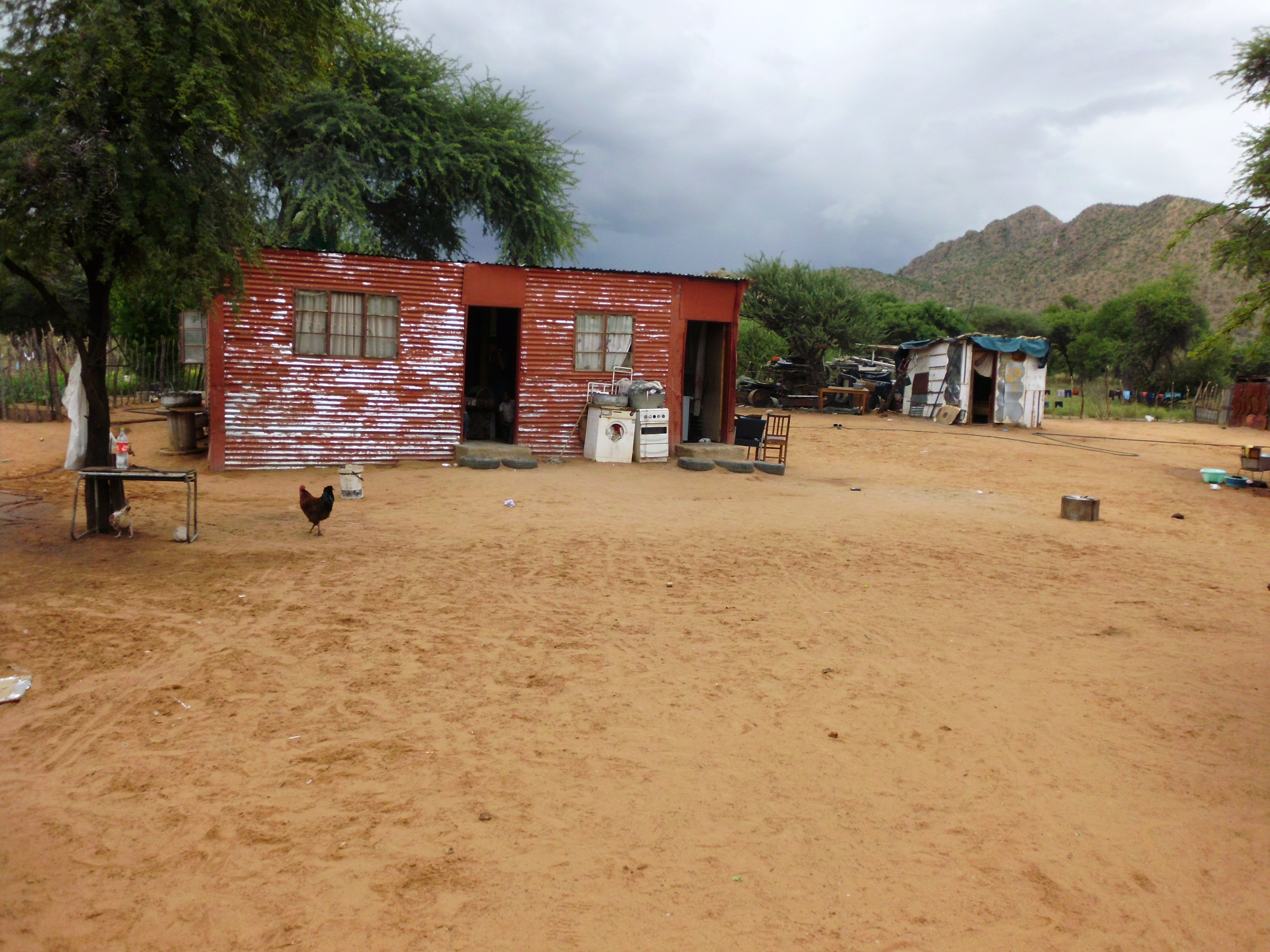
Dwelling in Groot Aub

Groot Aub (German: Groß Aub) is a settlement located approximately 60 kilometres (37 mi) south of Windhoek, in the Khomas Region of Namibia. It belongs to the Windhoek Rural electoral constituency and houses its constituency office. Since Windhoek's land area was vastly expanded in 2011, Groot Aub belongs to the capital. Its administration only shifted to Windhoek in September 2017.

Groot Aub is a poor community which consists of about 6,000 inhabitants of which most are small-scale farmers and pensioners. Having access to this land is the primary source of livelihood for the people in this community.

Groot Aub has experienced major development in the last few years. The village seems to be growing rapidly, and already has a school, a clinic and a police station. While at first there was no electricity and a shortage of water, the Khomas Regional Council started a project in 2004 to ensure an uninterrupted supply of water by laying underground pipelines in the Groot Aub community, thus providing water at all points. With the 2017 incorporation into Windhoek, however, tap water will no longer be free of charge.

Groot Aub is home to the Groot Aub Junior Secondary School, one of the 3 pilot schools in the NETA Project, as well as being one of the few Namibian partners in the Discovery Channel's Project. Six teachers were selected from this school in 2004 to participate in the NETA training program.
