= Amraal Lambert =

Captain of the Kaiǀkhauan (c. 1774–1864)

Captain of the Kaiǀkhauan
- Reign: ? – 13 February 1864
- Predecessor: Position established
- Successor: Andreas Lambert
- Born: c. 1774; Clanwilliam, Dutch Cape Colony
- Died: 13 February 1864 (aged 89–90); Gobabis
- Khoekhoe language name: ǂGaiǀnub

Amraal Lambert (Khoekhoe: ǂGaiǀnub; c. 1774 – 13 February 1864) was the first Kaptein of the Kaiǀkhauan (Khauas Nama), a subtribe of the Orlam, in the eastern area of Namaland, Namibia.

Amraal Lambert was born around 1774 near Hex River in the Clanwilliam district in the Dutch Cape Colony (present-day South Africa). A Cape Khoikhoi descendant, his status was little better than that of a slave, and he was forced to work in Worcester and Cape Town in his youth. In 1814 Lambert moved to Namaland (today's eastern-central Namibia), accompanied by missionary Heinrich Schmelen, who baptised him in Bethanie in 1815. Schmelen and the Kaiǀkhauan group led by Lambert stayed together for 14 more years but Schmelen closed the missionary station in Bethanie in 1822 and travelled on. Lambert accompanied Schmelen on his travel to Walvis Bay in 1825.

Between 1830 and 1860, Amraal Lambert and his cousin Jonker Afrikaner controlled much of southern and central South West Africa. Together they have been described as "super-power[s] in the cattle raiding business". From 1825 onwards Jonker Afrikaner and his council played a dominant political role in Damaraland and Namaland, creating a de facto state.

In 1840 Lambert and his people moved to Naosanabis (today Leonardville) where they allied with ǁOaseb, leader of the Khaiǁkhaun (Red Nation). In 1855 or 1856 they abandoned Naosanabis and moved to ǂKoabes. Amraal, who spoke only Afrikaans, could not pronounce the Nama name for this settlement, and changed it to its now common name Gobabis.

In the 1860s the Kaiǀkhauan were severely weakened in their political and economic power. Their cattle died of lung disease, and smallpox befell the Nama community at Gobabis. Many members of the Lambert family succumbed to the disease, among them Amraal who died on 13 February 1864 in Gobabis. His grandson Andreas Lambert succeeded him as Captain of the Kaiǀkhauan at the age of 20.
