= Brakwater =

- Settlement annexed to Windhoek
- Location within Namibia
- Coordinates: 22°27′54″S 17°4′37″E
- Country: Namibia
- Constituency: Windhoek Rural
- Time zone: UTC+2 (South African Standard Time)

Brakwater (Afrikaans: brackish water) is a settlement 20 kilometres (12 mi) north of Windhoek in the Khomas Region of Namibia. Since Windhoek's land area was vastly expanded in 2011, Brakwater belongs to the capital. It belongs to the Windhoek Rural electoral constituency.

Brakwater was the end point of the first 17 km of non-gravel road in South West Africa, when Windhoek's main road to the North was tarred in 1957. This road today is part of the B1 national road.

Brakwater is not a village or town in the classical sense. It rather consists of a large area of plots of at least 1 hectare each that in the past have been used for residential and business purposes. It includes the smaller areas of Emmarentia, Döbra, and Nubuamis, as well as the Mix informal settlement, and it is sometimes referred to as Greater Brakwater Area. Due to the geographical location of the nearby capital of Windhoek which is almost completely enclosed by a rocky, mountainous area the vast, flat Brakwater area is the most feasible place for Windhoek's expansion. It is therefore planned to expand municipality services in this area, including access roads, water and electricity supply as well as sewerage. This process has influenced property prices and sales volumes; sometimes Brakwater is already listed as suburb of Windhoek.
