= Baumgartsbrunn =

- Settlement annexed to Windhoek
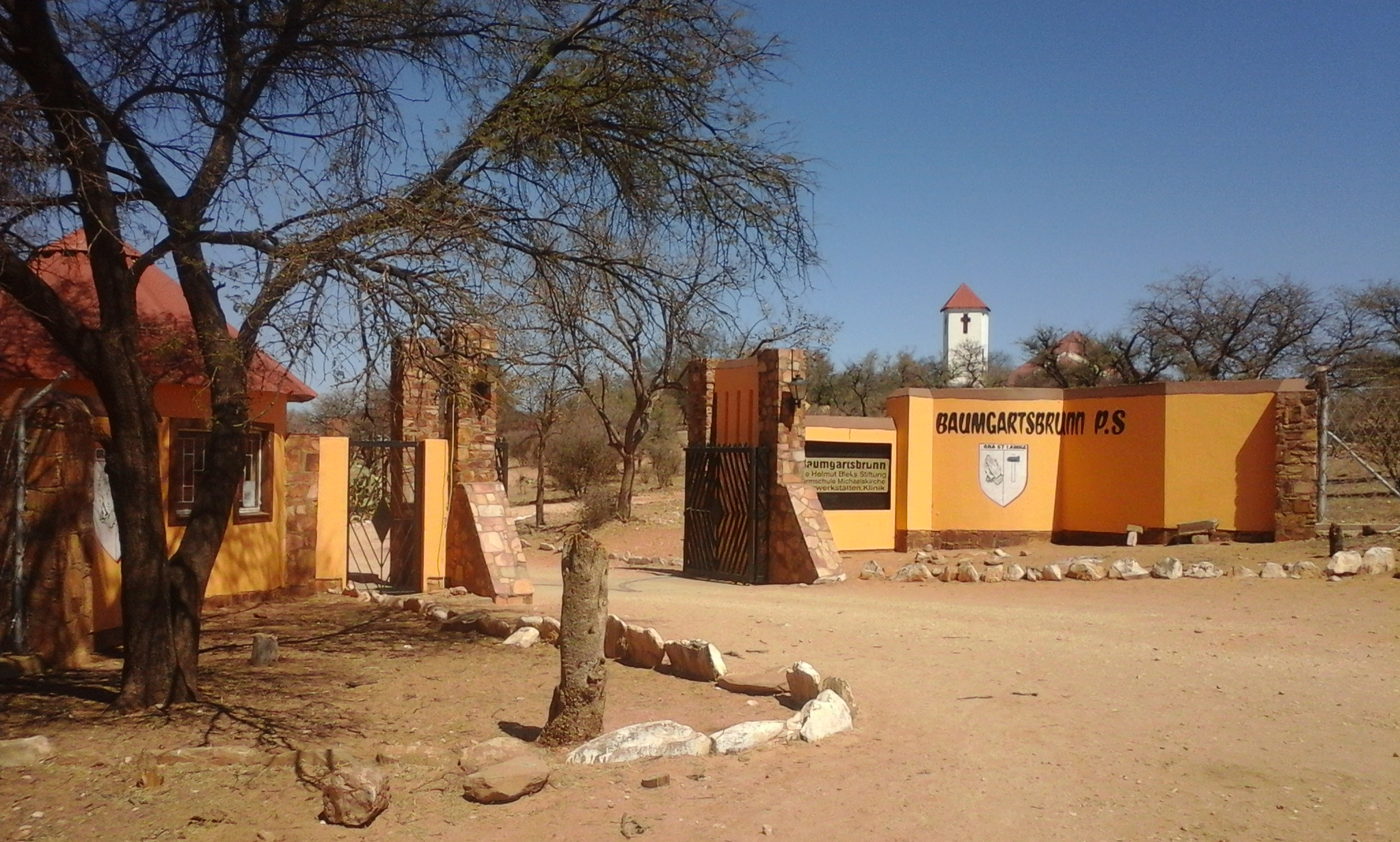
- Entrance of the Baumgartsbrunn farm in central Namibia

- Location in Namibia
- Coordinates: 22°36′0″S 16°47′0″E
- Country: Namibia
- Region: Khomas Region
- Constituency: Windhoek Rural
- Elevation: 5,764 ft (1,757 m)
- Time zone: UTC+2 (South African Standard Time)

Baumgartsbrunn is a farmstead and settlement in the Khomas Region of central Namibia, situated on the C28 approximately 35 kilometres (22 mi) west of Windhoek. It belongs to the Windhoek Rural electoral constituency. Since Windhoek's land area was vastly expanded in 2011, Baumgartsbrunn belongs to the capital.

Baumgartsbrunn known for the educational projects set up by Helmut Bleks, and after his death supported by the Helmut Bleks Foundation and other donors. Bleks, the farm owner in the 1970s, established a farm school, today the government boarding school Primary School Baumgartsbrunn, on the farm land in 1973.

In 1991 the Institute for Domestic Science & Agriculture, a vocational school for local women, was added. The school offers training for domestic workers but its qualifications are not accredited, a situation that has led to protests by the students. Namibia's ruling SWAPO party called for a take-over of the Helmut Bleks Foundation by the Namibian government.

Surrounding the school a small settlement has evolved over the years, mainly consisting of people from the ǀKhomanin clan of the Damara people. Following disputes over land and grazing rights, the foundation owning the farm granted exclusive settling and land use rights on 300 hectares (740 acres) to the ǀKhomanin in 2009.
