= C29 road (Namibia) =

Secondary route in Namibia

C29 road

Major junctions
- North-East end: C22 near Otjinene
- South-West end: B6 near Omitara

Location
- Country: Namibia

Highway system
- Transport in Namibia
← C28	→ C30

C29 is a secondary route in Namibia, leading from the B6 east of Windhoek to Otjinene. The C29 branches off the B6 approximately 95 kilometres (59 mi) east of Windhoek at Omitara and terminates to the north at the C22 junction near Otjinene. It is 154 kilometres (96 mi) long.
