= Caspar C 29 =

C 29
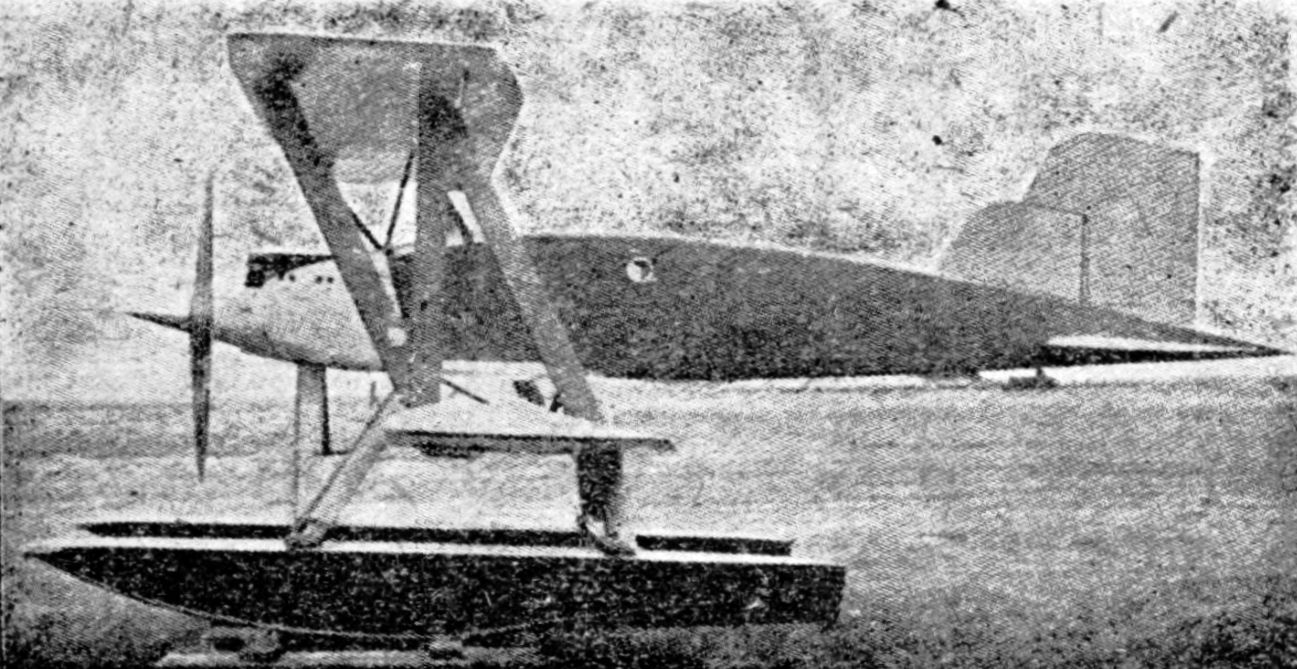

General information
- Type: Reconnaissance aircraft, mail plane
- Manufacturer: Caspar-Werke
- Designer: Reinhold Mewes
- Number built: 1

History
- First flight: 1926

The Caspar C 29 was a 2-seat floatplane mail carrier and reconnaissance developed in Germany, but built by Dansk Aero in Denmark in the mid-1920s.

== Design and development ==
The C 29 was intended to take part in the 1926 Deutschen Seeflugwettbewerb at Warnemünde, but crashed a few days before the competition.

== Specifications ==
Data from

General characteristics

- Crew: 2
- Length: 9.98 m (32 ft 9 in)
- Wingspan: 13.00 m (42 ft 8 in)
- Height: 4.18 m (13 ft 9 in)
- Wing area: 47.44 m^{2} (510.6 sq ft)
- Empty weight: 1,310 kg (2,888 lb)
- Gross weight: 2,000 kg (4,409 lb)
- Powerplant: 1 × Hispano-Suiza 12Jb V-12 water-cooled piston engine, 280 kW (380 hp)
- Propellers: 2-bladed fixed pitch propeller

Performance

- Maximum speed: 200 km/h (120 mph, 110 kn)
- Cruise speed: 175 km/h (109 mph, 94 kn)
- Range: 700 km (430 mi, 380 nmi)
