= Castel C-24 =

General information
- Type: Training glider
- National origin: France
- Manufacturer: Castel
- Number built: 1

History
- First flight: 5 April 1936

The Castel C-24 was a training glider built in the late 1930s in France. It was a glider of high-wing monoplane configuration. In English, Castel C-24 translated to Castle C-24. It was produced by the manufacturer Castel. Another product was built by the same manufacturer, with a similar name, which was called the Castel C-24S. It was also built in the late 1930s.

== History ==
The C-34 Condor, the engineer Robert Castello's previous glider, was destroyed in an accident during a sandow launch on 27 June 1934. Though the fuselage was far beyond destroyed, the wings still remained available. Inspired by Robert Kronfeld's engineering, Castello studied a two-seater tandem fuselage in 1935 and a central plane on which the wings of the C-34 were mounted. The C-24 was followed by the C-24 Casoar, a similar glider design, now with a two-piece wing and no central fuselage. A third model with a redesigned fuselage was built by the apprentices at Caudron Renault for the Billancourt Olympic Club. On 8 May 1938 Spire and Poirot improved the French men's tandem distance record with 91 km on the COB C-24. This record was improved on 23 April 1938 by Colin and Melleton on the same aircraft with 200 km.

== Design ==
The rear seat, that of the instructor, is in the centre of gravity. It is accessed through a door under the left wing, where visibility and comfort are deplorable. The front seat is protected by a multi-panel canopy.

== Specifications ==
General characteristics

- Crew: Two
- Length: 8.00 m (26 ft 3 in)
- Wingspan: 19.00 m (62 ft 4 in)
- Height: 2.18 m (7 ft 2 in)
- Wing area: 23.30 m^{2} (250.8 sq ft)
- Aspect ratio: 23
- Empty weight: 175 kg (386 lb)
- Gross weight: 349 kg (769 lb)

Performance
