= Omatako Mountains =

Twin mountains in Otjozondjupa Region, Namibia

Coordinates: 21.2031°S 16.7119°E

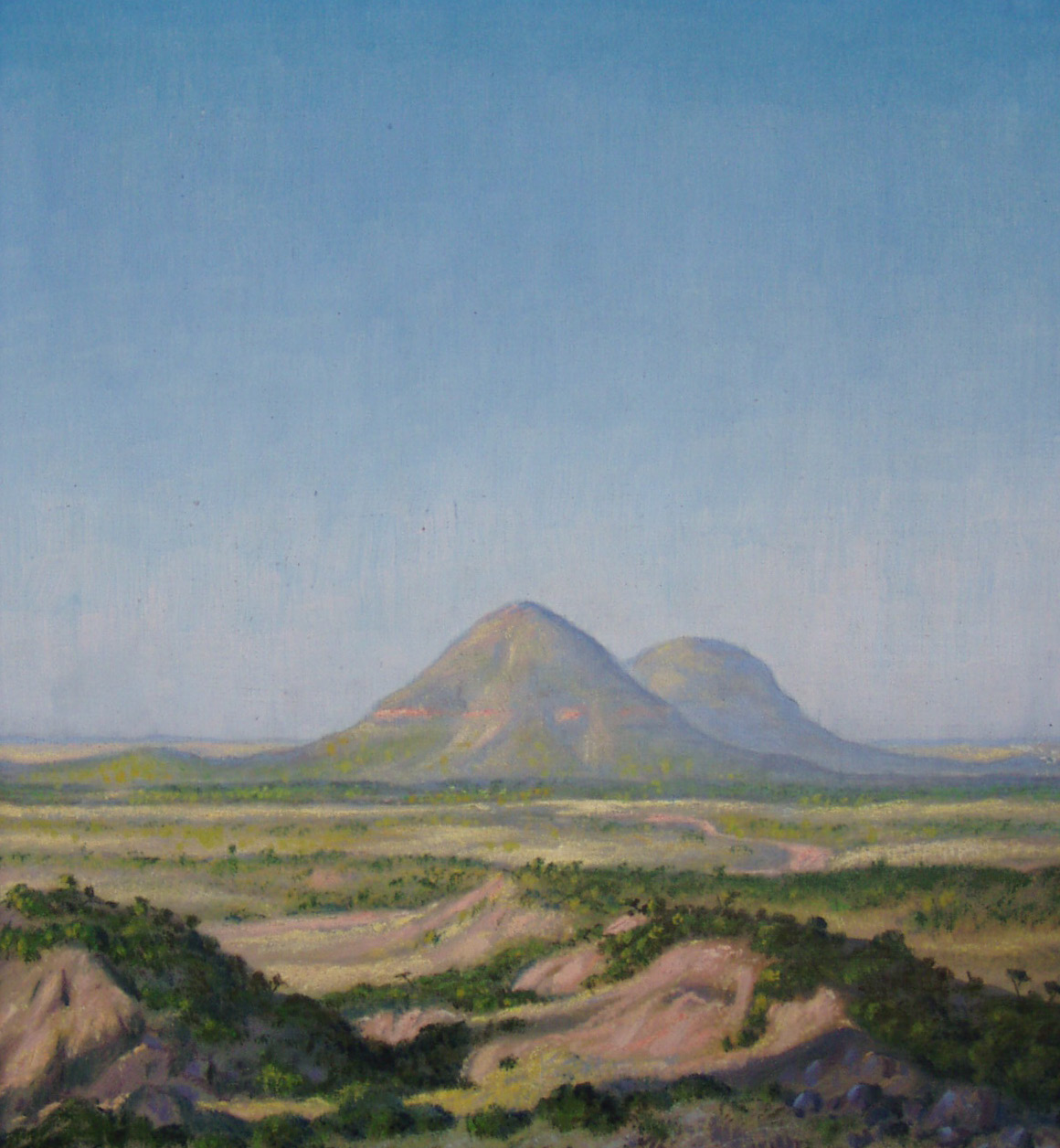
Oil painting of Omatako by Helmut Lewin

The Omatako Mountains (German: Omatakoberge) are two mountains in central Namibia's Otjozondjupa Region, located some 90 km (56 mi) north of Okahandja. Their name in the Herero language literally means "buttocks". Omatako Constituency, where the mountains are situated, derives its name from them.

The northwesterly of the two peaks, the Great Omatako (German: Omatako-Spitze), is 2,300 m (7,500 ft) in height, considerably higher than the other peak. The first European to record the locality was C. J. Andersson in 1851.

== Geology ==
The uppermost 300 m (980 ft) of each Omatako mountain is made of basalt and dolerite respectively; the darker, more spherical southeastern summit is made of dolerite, while the smooth slopes of the higher northwestern summit are made of basalt.

== See also ==
- Breast-shaped hill
