= C24 road (Namibia) =

Secondary route in Namibia

C24 road

Major junctions
- East end: B1 near Rehoboth
- West end: M47 junction at Weavers Birds Nest Rest Area, Farm Kwartel, Rehoboth

Location
- Country: Namibia

Highway system
- Transport in Namibia
← C23	→ C25

The C24 is an unpaved secondary route in Namibia that runs from the southern outskirts of Rehoboth westwards into the direction of Klein Aub.

The C24 branches off the B1 south of Rehoboth and runs 39 kilometres (24 mi) westwards. It terminates at the junction with D1261 to Isabis, near the Weavers Birds Nest Rest Area, in which the C24 becomes the M47.
