= Seeis =

Seeis Okangondo
- Settlement annexed to Windhoek
- Location in Namibia
- Coordinates: 22°27′S 17°35′E
- Country: Namibia
- Region: Khomas Region
- Constituency: Windhoek Rural Constituency
- Time zone: UTC+2 (South African Standard Time)

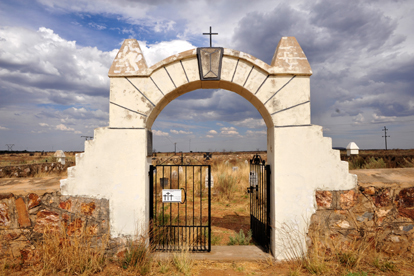
War cemetery of the German colonial forces in Seeis, Namibia

Seeis ([ˈseːaɪs], Otjiherero: Okangondo) is a small settlement in the Khomas Region of central Namibia. It is situated on the B6 national road 11 km (6.8 mi) east of Hosea Kutako International Airport on the turnoff of the dirt road D1458. The Seeis Rivier, an ephemeral river, cuts the settlement. Seeis is a railway stop on the Windhoek - Gobabis railway line.

Since Windhoek's land area was vastly expanded in 2011, Seeis belongs to the capital. The settlement belongs to the Windhoek Rural electoral constituency and features a school and a police station. The Seeis stud warmblood horse stud farm is located nearby. It has produced a number of successful sport horses and stallions.

== History ==
Seeis was a populated outpost at least since German colonisation in the 1880s. Manasse ǃNoreseb, leader of the Kaiǁkhaun, settled here with his clan in 1889 while fleeing from the approaching troops of Hendrik Witbooi, his archenemy. At that time, Seeis was under the control of Maharero, chief of the Herero people. In 1897 a post office was built, and it was situated on one of the few proclaimed roads.

In the Herero and Nama uprising of 1904/08, Seeis was the location of two clashes between imperial Germany's Schutztruppe and Herero troops under the leadership of Samuel Maharero. In the Skirmish at Seeis Germans under Lieutenant von Niewitecki relieved the military stations at Seeis, Hohewarte and Hatsamas from Herero occupation on 21 January 1904. On 15 February 1904, fortunes changed and the Herero defeated a German troop under the command of von Fischel. This event is known as the Battle of Seeis. Seeis cemetery has a separate section of German war graves from that period, refurbished and maintained by the Farmers' Association of Seeis.

== In the media ==
An adventure novel by Bernhard Voigt: Die Farmer vom Seeis-Rivier (The farmers of Seeis Rivier) was published in the late 1930s. This book inspired by national socialist ideas was banned in the Soviet occupation zone of Germany after World War II by the military administration.

== Gallery ==
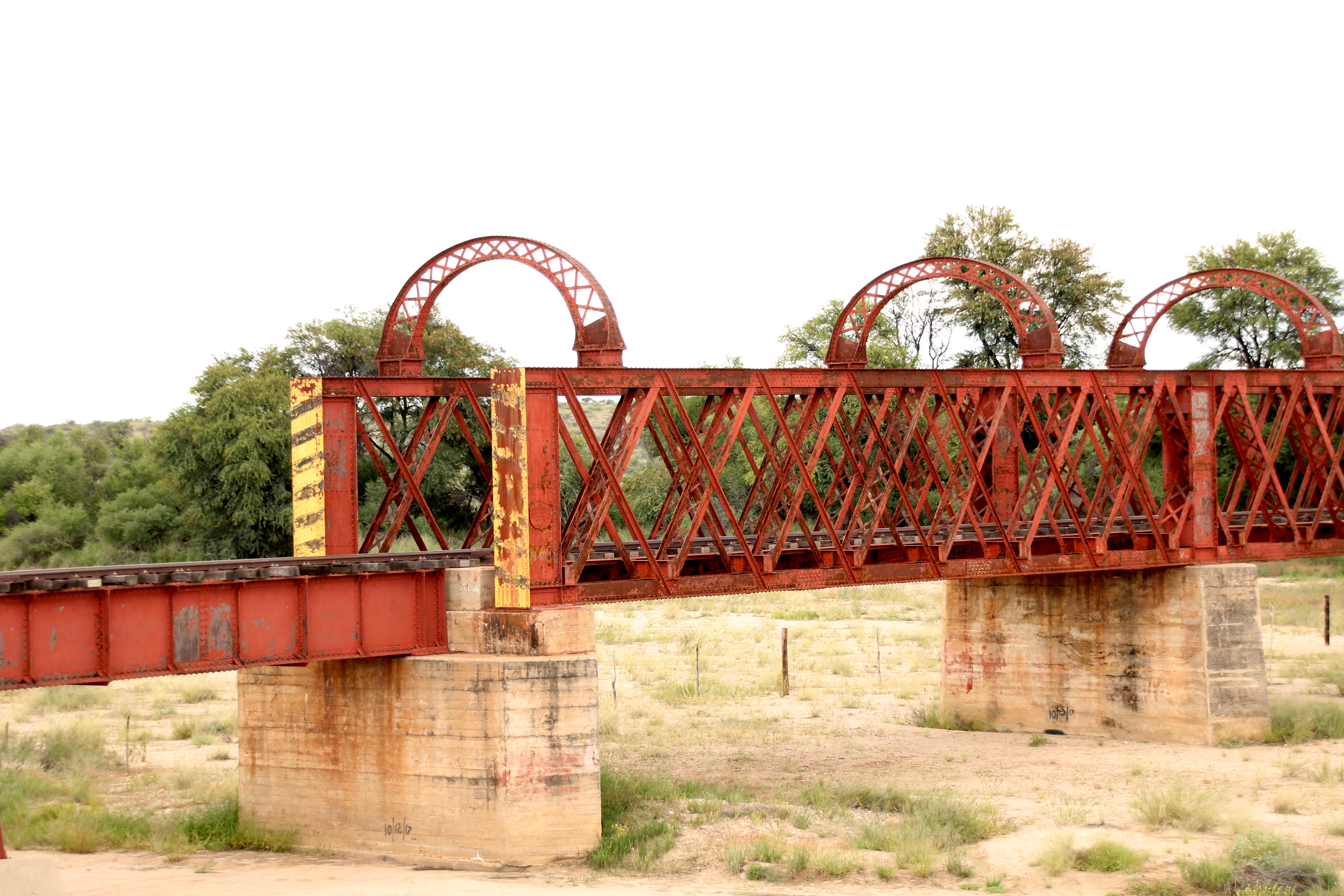
Eisenbahnbrücke Seeis (2018)

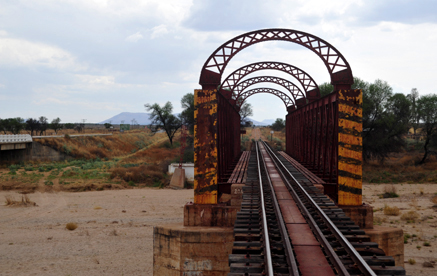
Railway bridge over the Seeis River
