= Hardap Region =

Coordinates: 24°37′S 17°57′E

- Region
- Location of the Hardap Region in Namibia
- Country: Namibia
- Capital: Mariental

Government
  - Governor: Riaan Charles McNab

Area
  - Total: 109,781 km^{2} (42,387 sq mi)

Population (2023 census)
  - Total: 106,680
  - Density: 0.97175/km^{2} (2.5168/sq mi)
- Time zone: UTC+2 (CAT)
- HDI (2017): 0.665 medium · 5th
- Website: hardaprc.gov.na

Hardap is one of the fourteen regions of Namibia. Its capital is Mariental. Hardap contains the municipality of Mariental, the towns of Rehoboth and Aranos, and the self-governed villages of Gibeon, Gochas, Kalkrand, Stampriet, and Maltahöhe. The Hardap Dam is located in the region.

== Geography ==
Hardap stretches the entire width of Namibia, from the Atlantic Ocean in the west to Namibia's eastern national border. In the northeast, it borders the Kgalagadi District of Botswana, and in the southeast, it borders the Northern Cape Province of South Africa. Domestically, it borders the following regions:

- Erongo – northwest
- Khomas – north central
- Omaheke – northeast
- ǁKaras – south

== Politics ==
Hardap constituencies (2014)

As of 2020, Hardap had 52,534 registered voters. The region comprises eight electoral constituencies:

- Gibeon
- Mariental Rural
- Mariental Urban
- Rehoboth Rural
- Rehoboth Urban East
- Rehoboth Urban West
- Aranos (created in 2013)
- Daweb (created in 2013)

As in all other regions, SWAPO was by far the strongest political party since Namibian independence. In February 2009, then-governor Hanse-Himarwa was condemned by the National Society for Human Rights of Namibia for declaring Hardap Region "SWAPO territory" and urging supporters not to allow other political parties to "invade" the region.

=== Presidential elections ===
In the 2004 presidential election, the region supported Hifikepunye Pohamba of SWAPO with a narrow absolute majority of the votes (52%), followed by Ben Ulenga of the Congress of Democrats (21%) and Katuutire Kaura of the Democratic Turnhalle Alliance (16%). Four other candidates combined for the 11%.

=== Regional elections ===
In the 2004 regional election for the National Assembly of Namibia, SWAPO won all six constituencies.

In the 2015 regional elections, SWAPO obtained 65% of the total votes (2010: 60%) and won seven of the eight constituencies, with only Rehoboth Urban West narrowly won by the opposition. In the 2020 regional election, the Landless People's Movement (LPM, an opposition party formed in 2016) was the strongest party. It obtained 45% of the votes overall and won seven of the eight constituencies.

=== Governors ===
- Katrina Hanse-Himarwa (2004–2015)
- Esme Sophia Isaack (2015–2020)
- Salomon April (2020–2025)
- Riaan Charles McNab (2025-)

== Economy and infrastructure ==
Hardap has 55 schools with a total of 21,886 pupils. The region has good infrastructure with well-developed road networks.

== Demographics ==
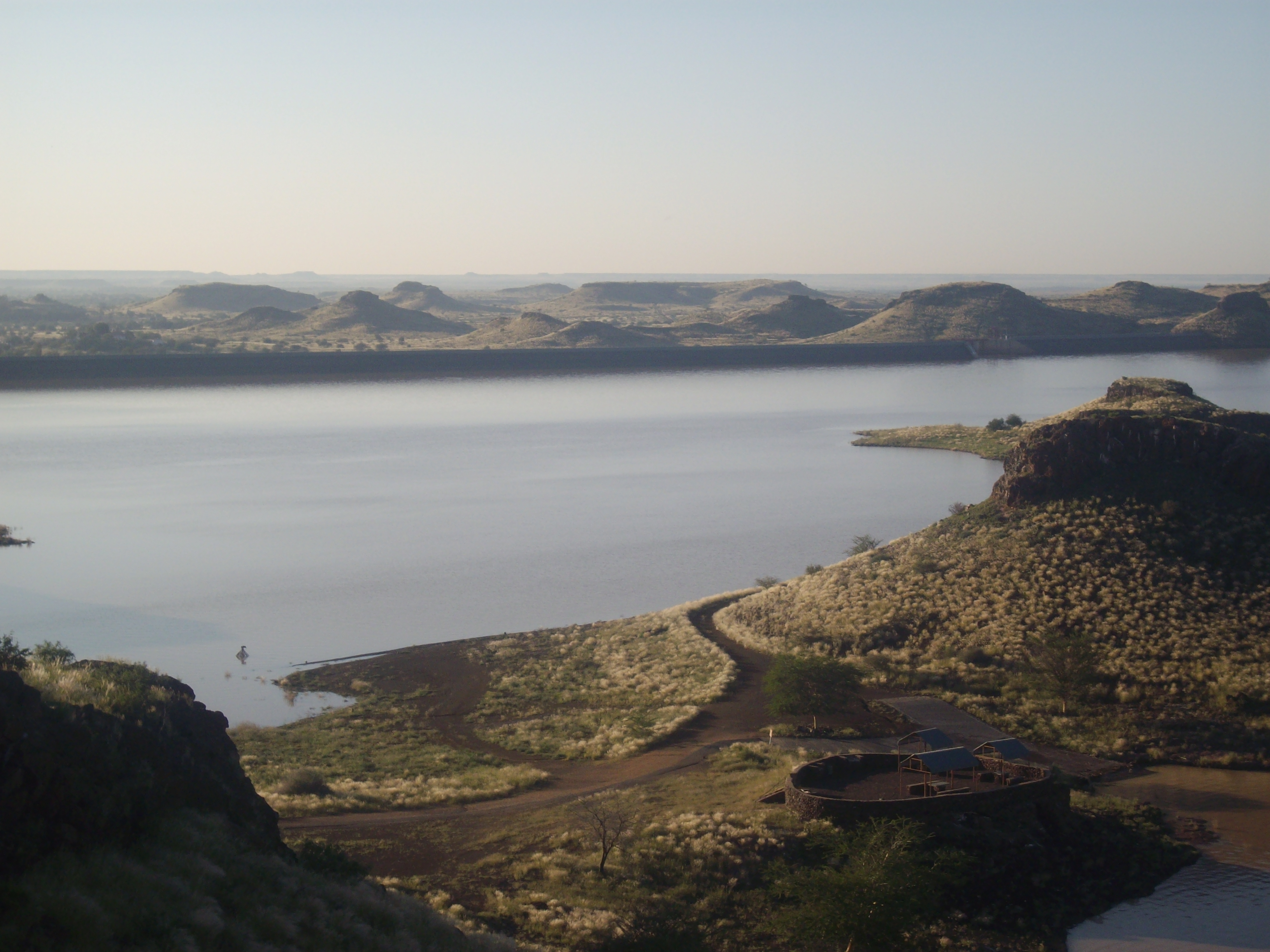
Hardap Dam, outside of Mariental, at sunrise in April 2008

According to the Namibia 2023 Population and Housing Census, Hardap had a population of 106,680 (52,357 females and 54,323 males or 104 males for every 100 females), growing at an annual rate of 2.4%. The fertility rate was 3.7 children per woman. 74.3% lived in urban areas while 25.7% lived in rural areas, and with an area of 109,651 km^{2}, the population density was 1.0 persons per km^{2}. By age, 11.9% of the population was under 5 years old, 21.4% between 5 and 14 years, 58.3% between 15 and 59 years, and 8.4% 60 years and older. The population was divided into 28,197 households, with an average size of 3.6 persons. 43.6% of households had a female head of household, while 56.4% had a male. For those 15 years and older, 68.5% had never married, 21.6% married with a certificate, 0.6% married traditionally, 3.1% married by consensual union, 1.9% were divorced or separated, and 3.9% were widowed.

The most commonly spoken languages at home were Afrikaans (44% of households) and Nama/Damara (44%). For those 15 years and older, the literacy rate was 83%. Nearly half of the population is from coloured and white Namibian groups. In terms of education, 84% of girls and 83% of boys between the ages of 6–15 were attending school, and of those older than 15, 73% had left school, 9% were currently at school, and 13% had never attended.

In 2001, the employment rate for the labor force (64% of those 15+) was 66% employed and 34% unemployed. For those 15+ years old and not in the labor force (29%), 29% were students, 37% homemakers, and 33% retired, too old, etc. According to the 2012 Namibia Labour Force Survey, unemployment in the Hardap Region stood at 28.8%. The two studies are methodologically not comparable.

Among households, 93.2% had safe water, 32.0% no toilet facility, 62.1% electricity for lighting, and 42.1% had wood or charcoal for cooking. In terms of households' main sources of income, 3.8% derived it from farming, 56.1% from wages and salaries, 3.4% from business or non-farming, and 15.9% from pension.

In 2011, 5.1% of the entire population had a disability, of which 6.3% were deaf, 10.8% hearing impaired, 6.8% blind, 22.2% visually impaired, 5.1% had a speech disability, 11.2% upper limb disability, 26.5% lower limb disability, and 16.0% mental disability.
