= Auas Mountains =

Mountain range in Namibia

- Auasberge
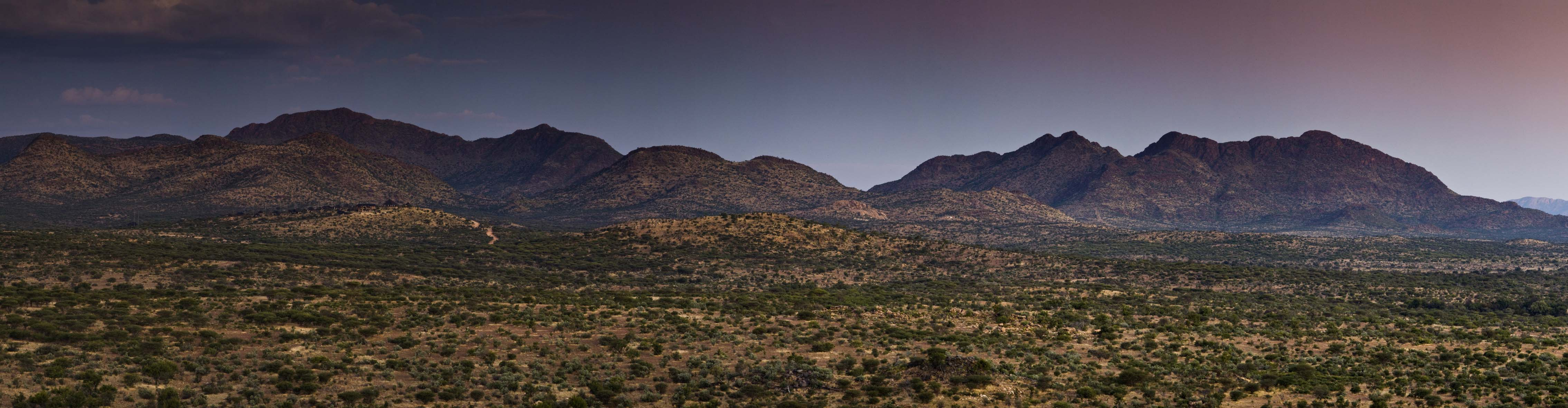

Highest point
- Elevation: 2,479 m (8,133 ft)
- Coordinates: 22°39′02″S 17°10′49″E

Geography
- Location within Namibia
- Location: Namibia

The Auas Mountains (Auasberge in German) is the highest mountain range in Namibia. Located near Windhoek, the range is 56 kilometers long, and is rich in flora and fauna. Moltkeblick 2,479 metres (8,133 ft) is the highest peak in the range, and the second highest in the country.
