= Mariental Rural =

Electoral constituency in the Hardap region of central Namibia

Coordinates: 24.6333°S 17.9667°E

Mariental Rural constituency (red) in the Hardap Region

Mariental Rural is a constituency in the Hardap region of Namibia. Its constituency office is situated in Stampriet. It had a population of 15,308 in 2011, up from 13,946 in 2001.

The constituency originally covered an area of 41,862 km^{2} (16,163 sq mi). In August 2013, Mariental Rural lost the eastern part of its territory, which became a constituency of its own, namely Aranos Constituency. As a result, Mariental Rural now covers an area of 15,037 km^{2} (5,806 sq mi). It had a population of 12,812 in 2023. As of 2020 the constituency had 4,065 registered voters.

== Politics ==
Mariental Rural is traditionally a stronghold of the South West Africa People's Organization (SWAPO) party. In the 2004 regional election, SWAPO candidate Katrina Hanse received 2,411 of the 4,636 votes cast and became councillor.

The 2015 regional elections were won by Simon Christy Dukeleni of SWAPO with 1,207 votes. The runner-up and only challenger was Anna Elizabeth de Kock of the Rally for Democracy and Progress with 276 votes.

For the 2020 regional election "serious procedural errors" were discovered in Mariental Rural. No initial result were announced, and the electoral court ordered a re-run. The re-run was conducted on 26 February 2021. As in all other constituencies of Hardap, the candidate of the Landless People's Movement (LPM, a new party registered in 2018) won. Deensia Swartbooi obtained 1,099 votes. Simon Gerhardus Kooper of SWAPO came second with 854 votes.
