= Stampriet =

Stampriet Khoekhoe: ǂĀǂams
- Village
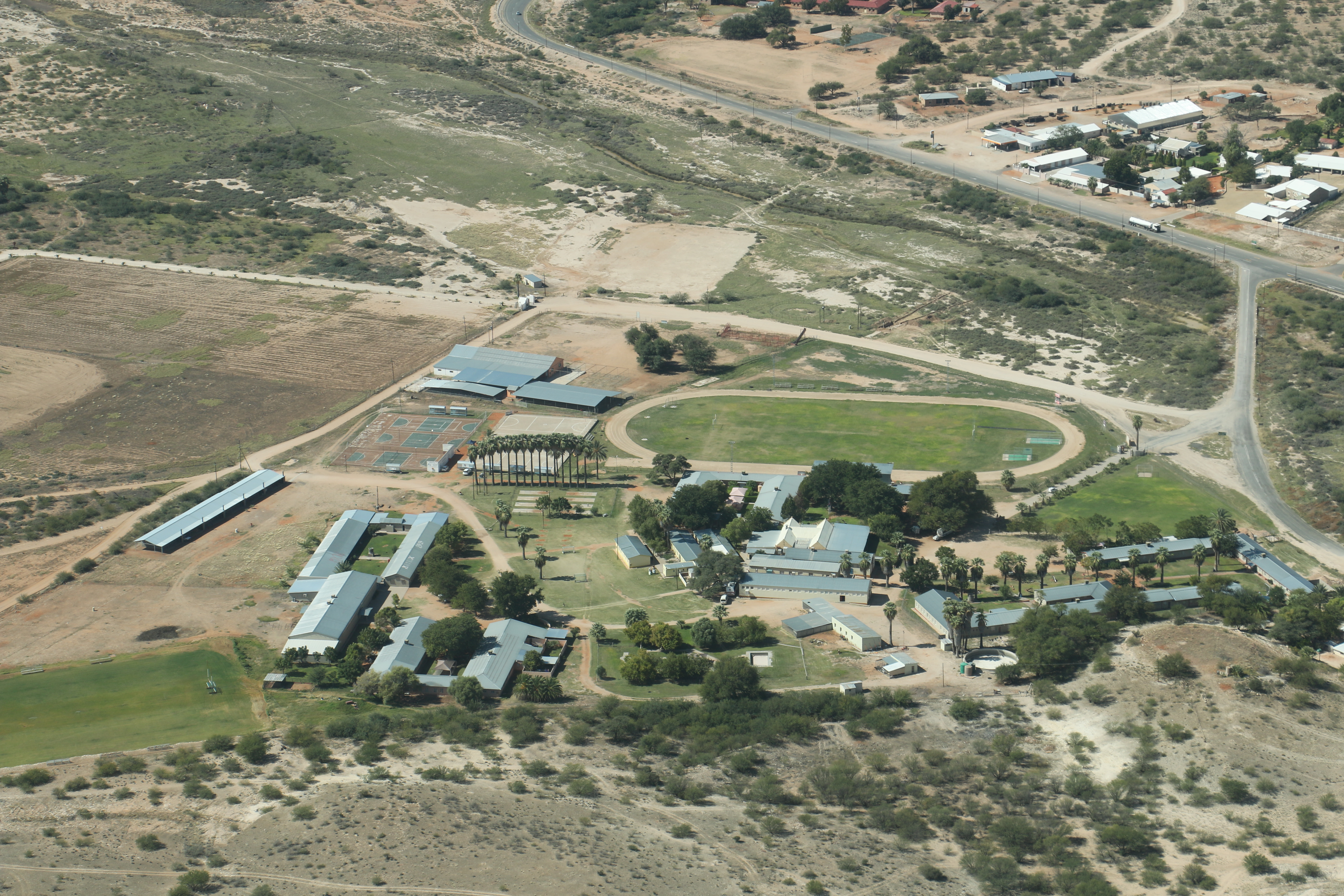
- Bird's eye view of western part of Stampriet

- Location in Namibia
- Coordinates: 24°20′S 18°24′E
- Country: Namibia
- Region: Hardap Region
- Constituency: Mariental Rural
- Founded: 1898

Population (2023)
  - Total: 3,388
- Time zone: UTC+2 (South African Standard Time)
- Climate: BWh

Stampriet is a village in the Hardap Region of central Namibia. It had 3,388 inhabitants in 2023.

== Geography ==
Stampriet is located 64 km (40 mi) north-east of Mariental and 1,177 m (3,862 ft) above sea level, in a barren area on the upper reaches of the Auob River where humans and animals alike depend on borehole water. Stampriet is the administrative center of the Mariental Rural electoral constituency.

Historical population
Year	Pop.	±% p.a.
1970	266	—
2011	1,890	+4.90%
2023	3,388	+4.98%

== History ==
Stampriet was founded in 1898 as a trading post in what was then German South West Africa. It was the scene of many battles between German and Nama troops. In 1970, the population included 70 whites, 1 mixed-race person, and 195 blacks.

The name Stampriet is an Afrikaans translation of the Khoekhoe name Aams. Given that stamp is Afrikaans for "bump," and riet is Afrikaans for "reed," it is likely named ever after the reeds one must trample to reach the watering hole or as a place where the "reed dance" or Umhlanga (ceremony), the famed royal ritual in southern Africa, was held. At first it was called Stamprietfontein, but the suffix was abandoned later.

== Economy and infrastructure ==
The local boreholes are strong, sometimes yielding up to 3.5 million liters of water a day, allowing local farmers to irrigate grain crops, especially corn and lucerne.

Stampriet is home to Privatskool Elnatan, founded in April 1992, which has 370 students in grades 1 through 12 and 61 staff. Due to the town's small size, 80% of students live in the school's four dormitories, coming from around the country since few private schools in Namibia offer Afrikaans-language education through grade 12. All instruction is in Afrikaans except for the vocational department.

== Politics ==
Stampriet is governed by a village council that has five seats.

In the 2010 local authority election, a total of 349 votes were cast in the village. SWAPO won with approximately 74% of the vote. Of the three other parties seeking seats, Rally for Democracy and Progress (RDP) received approximately 20% of the vote, followed by Democratic Turnhalle Alliance (DTA, 5%) and the Congress of Democrats (CoD) which received 0 votes despite being on the ballot. SWAPO also won the 2015 election and gained four seats (460 votes). The remaining seat went to the DTA which obtained 63 votes.

In the 2020 local authority election "serious procedural errors" were discovered for the Stampriet village council. Some voters had been handed ballot papers without being registered as living in the village, as is required for the local authority election. No initial result were announced, and the electoral court ordered a re-run. The re-run was conducted on 26 February 2021 and won by the newly formed Landless People's Movement (LPM). LPM gained 353 votes and three seats in the village council, followed by SWAPO with two seats (272 votes).

== Notable people ==
Former Namibian Rugby star Jacques Burger resides in Stampriet.
