= Leonardville, Namibia =

Village in eastern Namibia

Leonardville Naosanabis Wesley Vale
- Village
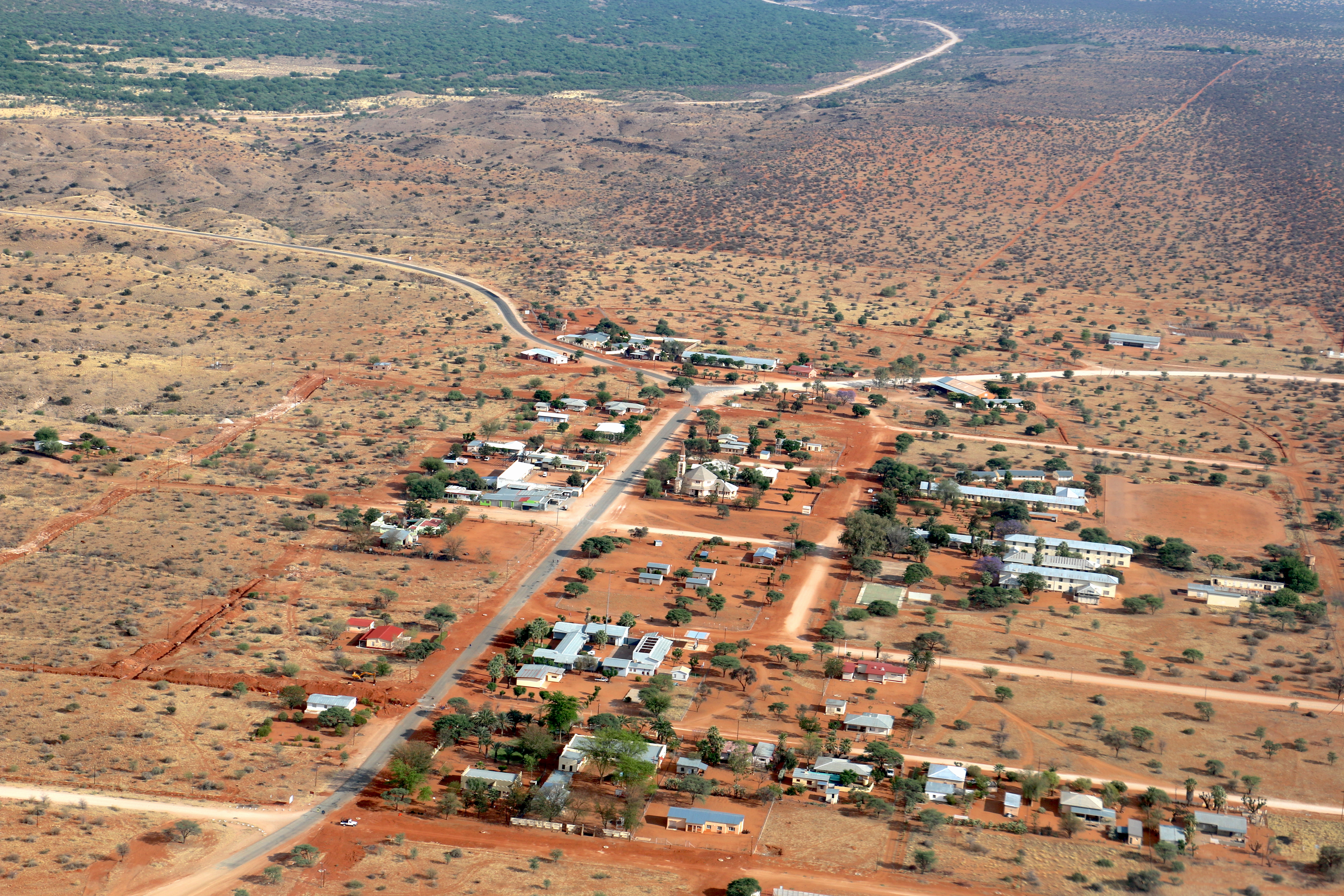
- Bird's eye view of Leonardville (October 2015)

- Location in Namibia
- Coordinates: 23°30′S 18°48′E
- Country: Namibia
- Region: Omaheke Region
- Constituency: Aminuis Constituency

Population (2023)
  - Total: 2,099
- Time zone: UTC+2 (SAST)
- Climate: BWh

Leonardville is a village in eastern Namibia, situated on the Nossob River in the south-western corner of the Omaheke Region. It belongs to the Aminuis electoral constituency. It had a population of 2,099 people in 2023.

Leonardville was the main settlement of the Khaiǁkhaun (Khauas Nama) subtribe of the Oorlam people until their military defeat against Imperial Germany's Schutztruppe soldiers in 1894 and 1896.

== History ==
The area around Leonardville was inhabited by the Taa-speaking subtribe of the San people until the Khaiǁkhaun (Red Nation), who called the place Naosanabis, occupied their land. Around 1840, the group around Amraal Lambert, first Kaptein of the Kaiǀkhauan Orlam, moved into the area. They had been granted residence and pasture in the land of the Red Nation at an annual fee. In 1843, the Wesleyan Missionary Society established a missionary station here; its first missionaries were Joseph Tindall and his son Henry. They named the settlement Wesley Vale. In 1855, the Rhenish Missionary Society took over the operations. They bought the existing buildings—the church, the pastor's house, and the forge—and began to run a school for 60 to 80 children. Amraal Lambert's group, however, searched for a different place to settle. They moved to Gobabis in 1855 or 1856.

Amraal Lambert and most of his family died from smallpox in 1864. Some time after that the Kaiǀkhauan, now under the leadership of Amraal's grandson Andreas, moved back to Naosanabis. From here they controlled important trade routes. Using their technological advantage of commanding firearms and horses, they waylaid and robbed merchants. In the 1880s, the Kaiǀkhauan were considered a powerful and dangerous force.

When Imperial Germany colonised the area a decade later, Lambert refused to sign a "protection treaty". Regarding the Kaiǀkhauan as a comparatively weak force, the German commander, Theodor Leutwein mounted a surprise attack on Naosanabis on 6 March 1894 in order to set an example for the stronger forces in then German South-West Africa not to stand in his way.

The Schutztruppe forces won the battle and expelled the village's residents. The land was given to Angola Boers, farmers who participated in the Dorsland Trek migration movement from South Africa to Angola but decided to turn around and settle in South-West Africa. After the Herero and Namaqua Genocide 1904/05, Isaak Witbooi of the ǀKhowesin (Witbooi Orlam) moved to Naosanabis—the Kaiǀkhauan clan had at that time ceased to exist due to the devastating attack by the Germans. During South African administration the settlement was renamed to Leonardville after Dutch Reformed Church Minister Leonard.

== Geography ==
Leonardville is situated on the ephemeral Nossob River in the south-western corner of the Omaheke Region.

Historical population
Year	Pop.	±% p.a.
2011	1,086	—
2023	2,099	+5.64%

The place normally receives an annual average rainfall of 236 millimetres (9.3 in), although in the 2010/2011 rainy season 530 millimetres (21 in) were measured.

== People ==
Despite the encroachment of Tswana, Orlams, and Boers, there is still a considerable San population. Of the estimated 500 remaining Taa speakers in Namibia, over 50 reside in Leonardville.

== Economy and infrastructure ==
The C20 regional road leads past Leonardville. The main economic activity in the area is cattle farming.

Headspring Investments, the Namibian subsidiary of Uranium One, which in turn is owned by the Russian Rosatom, was prospecting for Uranium in the area and had opened an office in the village. Prospecting activities came to a halt in 2022 when government banned in situ mining and exploration drilling in or near important aquifers.

== Politics ==
Leonardville is governed by a village council that has five seats.

The first local election run after Namibian independence, the 1992 local elections, was won by SWAPO which obtained 206 votes and gained five seats. The Democratic Turnhalle Alliance (DTA) obtained the other two seats with 62 votes. The 1998 local authority elections saw a similar result. SWAPO won and gained six seats (180 votes), the DTA won the remaining seat with 41 votes.

In the 2010 local election in the village, SWAPO won three of the five seats on the village's local council. The Rally for Democracy and Progress (RDP) and the National Unity Democratic Organisation (NUDO) each won a single seat. The 2015 local authority election ended with the same result, three seats for SWAPO, and one each for NUDO and RDP. SWAPO also won the 2020 local authority election with 336 votes and three village council seats. One seat each went to the Landless People's Movement (LPM, a new party registered in 2018, 151 votes) and NUDO (60 votes).

== Notable people ==
- Jan de Wet (1927–2011), farmer and politician

== Literature ==
- Olivier, P.L. (1952). Ons gemeentelike feesalbum [Our congregational holiday album] (in Afrikaans). Cape Town and Pretoria: Dutch Reformed Church Press.
- Vedder, Heinrich (1997). Das alte Südwestafrika. Südwestafrikas Geschichte bis zum Tode Mahareros 1890 [The old South-West Africa. South-West Africa's history until Maharero's death 1890] (in German) (7th ed.). Windhoek: Namibia Scientific Society. ISBN 0-949995-33-9.
