= Hochfeld, Namibia =

Hochfeld
- Settlement
- Location within Namibia
- Coordinates: 21.491°S 17.852°E
- Country: Namibia
- Region: Otjozondjupa
- Constituency: Omatako
- Time zone: UTC+2 (SAST)

Hochfeld is a settlement in the Otjozondjupa Region of central Namibia. It is situated 135 kilometres (84 mi) north-east of Okahandja. The German name translates as "high field".
