= Aranos =

Aranos Arahoab (historical)
- Town
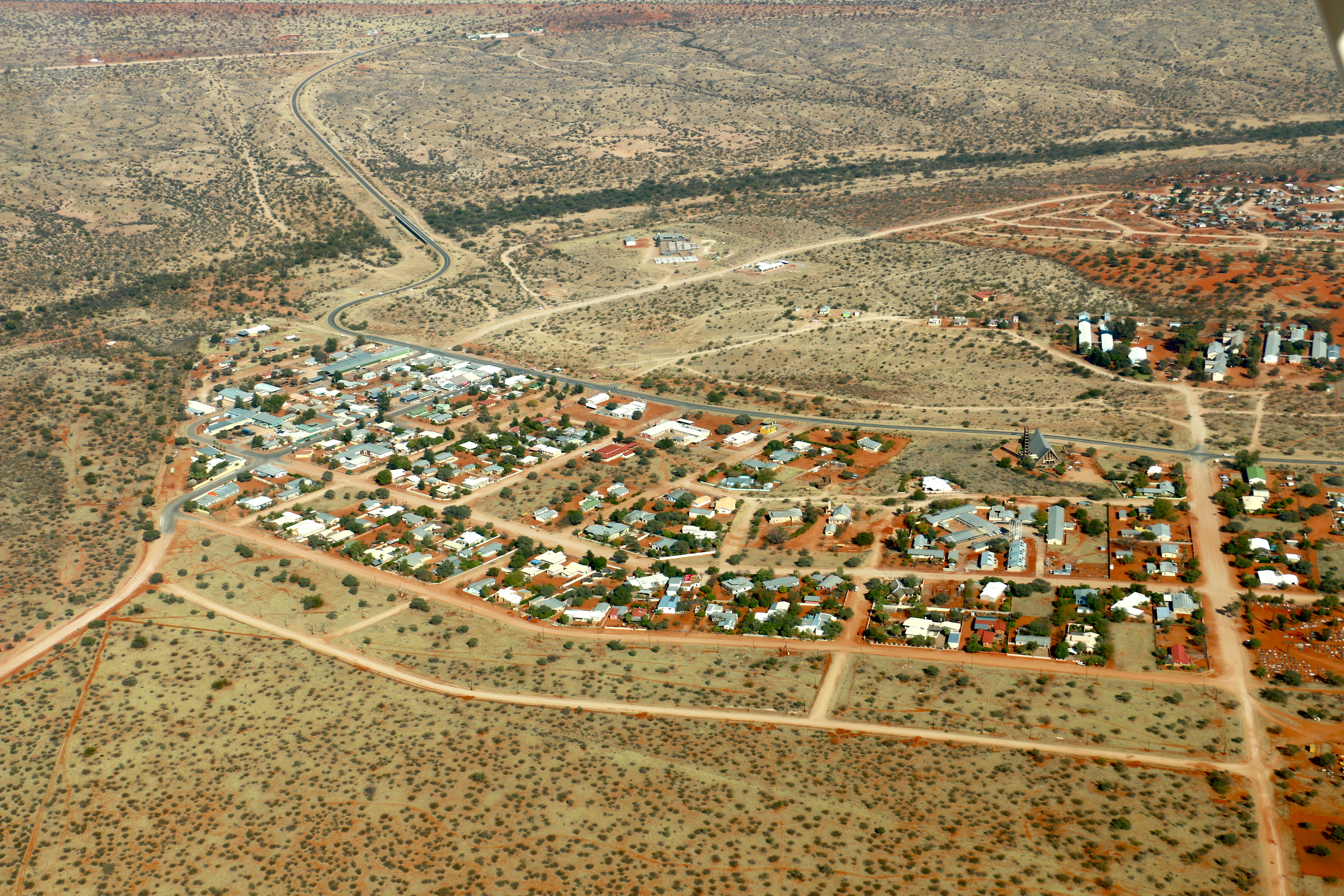
- Aranos from bird's eye view (2017)

- Location within Namibia
- Coordinates: 24°08′S 19°07′E
- Country: Namibia
- Region: Hardap Region
- Constituency: Aranos Constituency
- Proclaimed village: 1958
- Proclaimed town: 2010

Population (2023)
  - Total: 5,493
- Time zone: UTC+2 (South African Standard Time)
- Climate: BWh
- Website: www.aranostc.org/home.html

Aranos is a town in the Hardap Region of central Namibia, situated in the Nossob River basin in the Kalahari Desert. The town had 5,493 inhabitants in 2023.

The main economic activity is farming. The place normally receives an annual average rainfall of 188 millimetres (7.4 in), although in the 2010/2011 rainy season 505 millimetres (19.9 in) were measured.

== History ==
The original name of the settlement was Arahoab, Khoekhoe for red area. During the Herero Wars, Schutztruppe units of Imperial Germany's colonial forces were stationed here since March 1908. The volume of postal services to the military led to the opening of a post office in that year. After the war, in 1911, the military office was closed again. Postal services, however, continued until the Germans lost control of the colony in 1915.

To avoid confusion with the village of Aroab further south, Arahoab was renamed Aranos in the 1960s. Aranos is a portmanteau of Arahoab and Nossob River.

Aranos was proclaimed a village in 1958, and upgraded to "town" status in 2010.

== Politics ==
Upon Namibian independence Aranos was a village, governed by a seven-seat village council. The first local elections run in Namibia, the 1992 Namibian local elections was won by the Democratic Turnhalle Alliance (DTA) which obtained 611 votes and gained four seats. SWAPO came second with 415 votes and three seats. The result of the 1998 local authority elections was even closer. DTA again got four seats with 283 votes, SWAPO got the remaining thee seats with 262 votes.

In the 2004 local authority elections, SWAPO won the election for the first time, this time competing for only five seats in a downsized village council. SWAPO obtained 733 votes and gained three seats. One seat each were obtained by the DTA (234 votes) and the Republican Party (RP, 182 votes). SWAPO also won most votes (546) in the 2010 local authority election.. The DTA finished in 2nd place with 205 votes, followed by the Rally for Democracy and Progress (RDP, 186), SWANU (17) and the Congress of Democrats (15). SWAPO also won the 2015 election, gaining four seats in the town council (598 votes). The RDP gained two seats (246 votes), and the DTA one (194).

The 2020 local authority election was won by the newly formed Landless People's Movement (LPM) which scored well all over Hardap. LPM gained 745 votes and three seats in the town council, followed by SWAPO with two seats (465 votes), the likewise new Independent Patriots for Change (IPC) with one seat (283 votes) and the Popular Democratic Movement (PDM, the successor of the DTA), also with one seat and 90 votes. The current mayor is Marline Claasen.

Aranos is the administrative centre of Aranos Constituency since 2013. Before that it belonged to the Mariental Rural constituency.

== People ==
Aranos is the birthplace of former National Assembly member Jurie Viljoen and human rights activist Pauline Dempers.

Historical population
Year	Pop.	±% p.a.
2011	3,683	—
2023	5,493	+3.39%

== Gallery ==
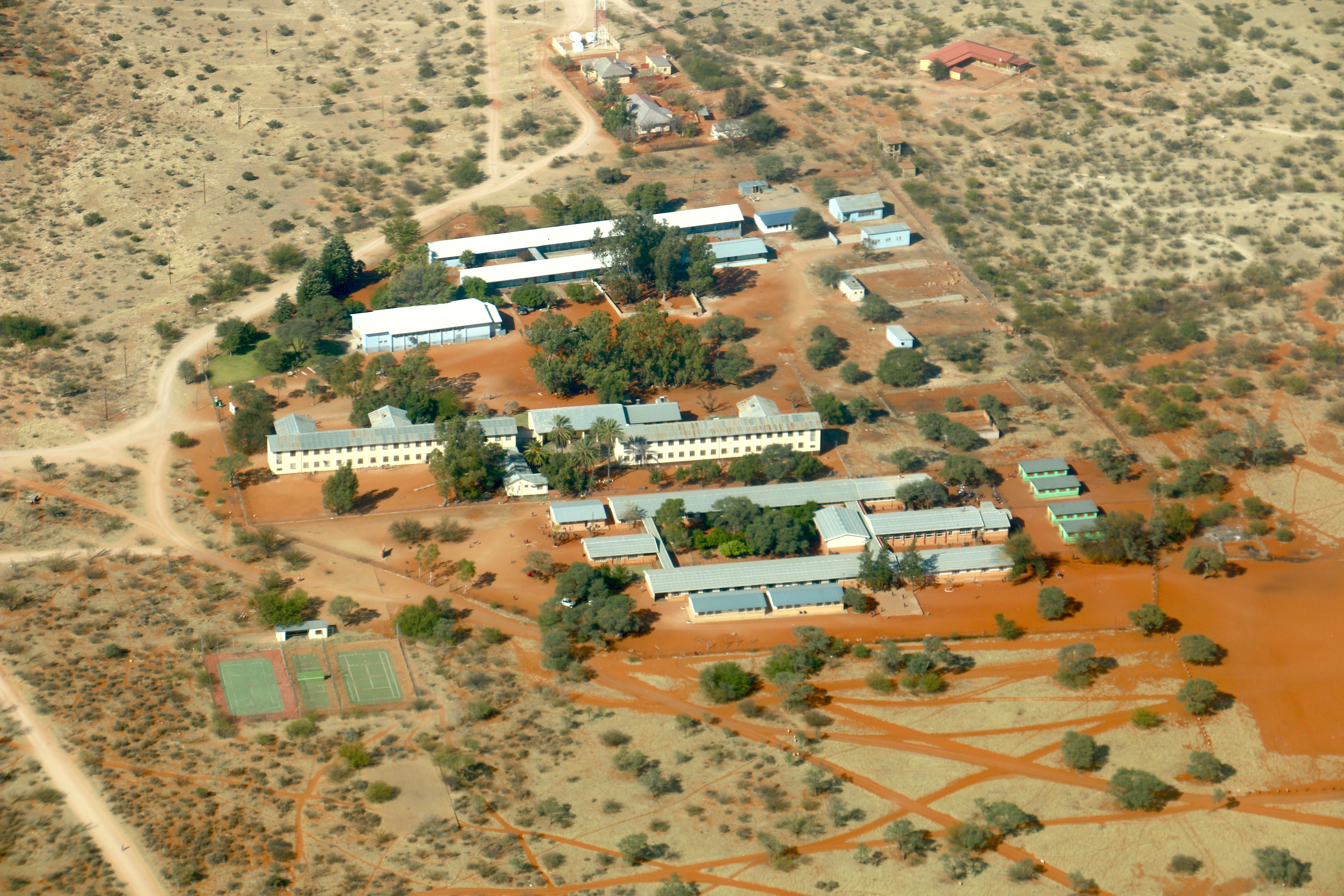
Aranos High School (2017)
