= Dordabis =

- Settlement
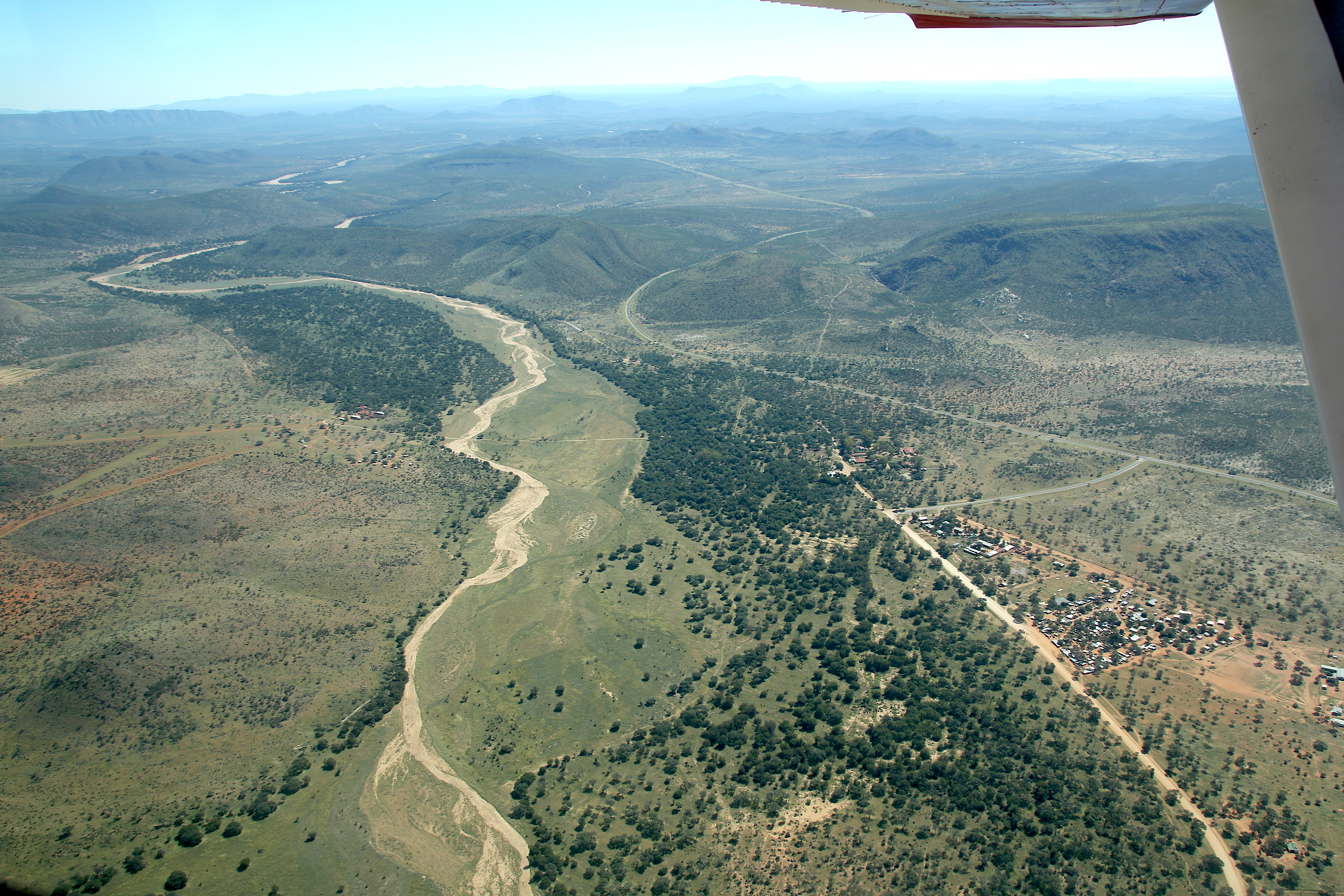
- Aerial view of Dordabis

- Location within Namibia
- Coordinates: 22°57′S 17°36′E
- Country: Namibia
- Region: Khomas
- Time zone: UTC+2 (South African Standard Time)

Dordabis is a settlement in the Khomas Region of central Namibia, 80 km east of the capital Windhoek. It belongs to the Windhoek Rural electoral constituency and is densely populated, with approximately 2,000 inhabitants on a 10-acre plot. The village normally receives an annual average rainfall of 293 millimetres (11.5 in), although in the 2010/2011 rainy season 605 millimetres (23.8 in) were measured. The main economical activity is farming.
