= 2020 Namibian local and regional elections =

Elections in Namibia

- 25 November 2020
- Registered: 1,375,640
- Turnout: 526,337 (38.26%)
Party	SWAPO	IPC	LPM
popular vote	293,626	89,030	35,184
Percentage	56.55%	17.14%	6.77%
Party	PDM	NUDO	Other parties
popular vote	35,010	12,258	50,296
Percentage	6.74%	2.36%	9.68%
- Winning party by constituency

Local and regional elections were held in Namibia on 25 November 2020 to elect new local and regional councils. The previous round of elections was held in 2015 and won by the ruling SWAPO party.

== Electoral system ==
Elections for Namibia's regional councils are held using the first-past-the-post electoral system. Voters in each constituency elect one councillor to represent them on their regional council. Local authority councillors are elected by a system of proportional representation. Local authority candidate lists have affirmative action requirements for women.

== Election process ==
Although Namibia has 1.35 million registered voters, only about 370,000 have voter cards that specify their area of residence, a requirement to elect local and regional councillors. A supplementary voter registration, also for citizens that have turned 18 and those who have relocated, was conducted between 7 and 15 September 2020, and yielded 188,000 registrations.

In April 2020, the Electoral Commission of Namibia announced that the national lockdown on account of the COVID-19 pandemic in the country would not affect the election date. The elections were conducted using paper ballots after the Supreme Court of Namibia ruled in February 2020 that without a paper trail, usage of electronic voting machines (EVMs) in elections contravened the Electoral Act of 2014.

== Results ==
=== Regional council elections ===
Winning party by constituency (As of 28 November 2020) PDM LPM IPC NUDO SWAPO UDF Independent candidates Outstanding constituency

For each of the 121 constituencies of Namibia one individual is elected to serve as constituency councillor and to represent their constituency in the respective regional council. The regional councils in turn select 3 representatives each to serve in the National Council.

While the ruling SWAPO party nominated candidates in all constituencies and for all local councils, four constituencies had no opposition candidates at all: Mankumpi, Nkurenkuru, Tondoro and Uuvudhiya. There the SWAPO candidate was declared the winner. In the Mariental Rural constituency "serious procedural errors" were discovered. No initial result were announced, and the electoral court ordered a re-run. The re-run was conducted on 26 February 2021.

Party	Abbreviation	Seats
SWAPO	SWAPO	88 ▼
Landless People's Movement	LPM	12 ▲
Independent Patriots for Change	IPC	5 ▲
National Unity Democratic Organisation	NUDO	4 ▲
Popular Democratic Movement	PDM	4 ▲
United Democratic Front of Namibia	UDF	4 ▲
Independent candidates	IC	4 ▲
Total seats	–	121
Total (voter turnout 38,26%)		

=== Local authority elections ===
Local elections determine the population of the village, town, and city councils and have a direct influence on who will become mayor, as this position is elected among all councillors. Contrary to the regional elections, local elections in Namibia are determined by party, not by individual candidate. There are 57 local authorities for which elections are conducted.

Results for the local authority elections were announced on 29 November. For Okakarara, Otavi and Katima Mulilo, the results were yet unavailable due to a necessary review. In all three towns it was alleged that the formula for allocating seats was not correctly applied. In the local authority elections for Aroab, Koës and Stampriet "serious procedural errors" were discovered. Voters were handed the wrong ballot papers, meant for a different local authority or for a different election. No initial results were announced, and the electoral court ordered a re-run. The re-run was conducted on 26 February 2021.
