= List of tripoints =

This is a list of all three-country tripoints on land or internal waters. Many of the coordinates listed below are only approximate. As of 2026, there are 181 international tripoints (including those of states with limited recognition). Africa has 62 international tripoints (the highest number of international tripoints), followed by Asia with 54, Europe with 50, South America with 13, and North America with two. Oceania has no international tripoints by virtue of being almost entirely island countries with no land borders.

== List ==
=== Africa ===
Name / description	Country 1	Country 2	Country 3	Coordinates	Region	Image
	Algeria	Libya	Niger	23°31′N 12°00′E	Africa - North	
	Algeria	Libya	Tunisia	30°14′N 9°32′E	Africa - North	
	Algeria	Mali	Mauritania	25°00′N 4°50′W	Africa - North	
	Algeria	Mali	Niger	19°9′N 4°16′E	Africa - North	
	Algeria	Mauritania	Western Sahara	27°18′N 8°40′W	Africa - North	
	Algeria	Morocco	Western Sahara	27°40′N 8°40′W	Africa - North	
	Angola	Democratic Republic of the Congo	Republic of the Congo	4°41′S 13°6′E	Africa - West/Central	
	Angola	Democratic Republic of the Congo	Zambia	10°53′S 23°59′E	Africa - South/East	
	Angola	Namibia	Zambia	17°38′S 23°28′E	Africa - South/East	
	Benin	Burkina Faso	Niger	11°54′N 2°24′E	Africa - West/Central	
	Benin	Burkina Faso	Togo	11°0′N 0°55′E	Africa - West/Central	
	Benin	Niger	Nigeria	11°42′N 3°36′E	Africa - West/Central	
Union's End (Nossob River/20°E)	Botswana	Namibia	South Africa	24°46′S 20°0′E	Africa - South/East	
near Kasane (four corners)	Botswana	Namibia	Zambia	17°47′16″S 25°15′24″E	Africa - South/East	
Limpopo–Shashe confluence	Botswana	South Africa	Zimbabwe	22°12′S 29°22′E	Africa - South/East	
Kasane (Four corners)	Botswana	Zambia	Zimbabwe	17°47′56″S 25°16′13″E	Africa - South/East	
	Burkina Faso	Ivory Coast	Ghana	9°29′N 2°41′W	Africa - West/Central	
	Burkina Faso	Ivory Coast	Mali	10°26′N 5°31′W	Africa - West/Central	
west of Senkase	Burkina Faso	Ghana	Togo	11°8′N 0°8′W	Africa - West/Central	
	Burkina Faso	Mali	Niger	15°0′N 0°14′E	Africa - West/Central	
Ruzizi River	Burundi	Democratic Republic of the Congo	Rwanda	2°45′S 29°2′E	Africa - South/East	
Lake Tanganyika	Burundi	Democratic Republic of the Congo	Tanzania	4°27′S 29°25′E	Africa - South/East	
	Burundi	Rwanda	Tanzania	2°24′S 30°34′E	Africa - South/East	
	Cameroon	Central African Republic	Chad	7°32′N 15°30′E	Africa - West/Central	
	Cameroon	Central African Republic	Republic of the Congo	2°13′N 16°12′E	Africa - West/Central	
Lake Tchad	Cameroon	Chad	Nigeria	13°5′N 14°5′E	Africa - West/Central	
	Cameroon	Gabon	Republic of the Congo	2°10′N 13°18′E	Africa - West/Central	
	Cameroon	Equatorial Guinea	Gabon	2°10′N 11°20′E	Africa - West/Central	
	Central African Republic	Chad	Sudan	10°56′N 22°52′E	Africa - West/Central	
near Betoukoumba	Central African Republic	Democratic Republic of the Congo	Republic of the Congo	3°28′N 18°37′E	Africa - West/Central	
near Nabiapai	Central African Republic	Democratic Republic of the Congo	South Sudan	5°1′N 27°27′E	Africa - West/Central	
	Central African Republic	South Sudan	Sudan	8°38.75′N 24°14.15′E	Africa - West/Central	
	Chad	Libya	Niger	23°N 15°E	Africa - North	
	Chad	Libya	Sudan	19.5°N 24°E	Africa - North	
Lake Tchad	Chad	Niger	Nigeria	13°42′N 13°38′E	Africa - West/Central	
	Ivory Coast	Guinea	Liberia	7°34′N 8°28′W	Africa - West/Central	
	Ivory Coast	Guinea	Mali	10°10′N 7°58′W	Africa - West/Central	
	Djibouti	Eritrea	Ethiopia	12°28′N 42°24′E	Africa - North	
	Djibouti	Ethiopia	Somalia / Somaliland (disputed)	10°59′N 42°58′E	Africa - North	
Mount Sabyinyo	Democratic Republic of the Congo	Rwanda	Uganda	1°23′S 29°36′E	Africa - South/East	
Salia Musala, near Oraba	Democratic Republic of the Congo	South Sudan	Uganda	3°30′N 30°52′E	Africa - South/East	
Lake Tanganyika	Democratic Republic of the Congo	Tanzania	Zambia	8°12′S 30°46′E	Africa - South/East	
near Gabal El Uweinat	Egypt	Libya	Sudan	22°N 25°E	Africa - North	
	Eritrea	Ethiopia	Sudan	14°15′N 36°34′E	Africa - North	
Mandera triangle	Ethiopia	Kenya	Somalia	3°59′N 41°54′E	Africa - South/East	
Ilemi Triangle	Ethiopia	Kenya	South Sudan	5.4°N 35.3°E (disputed)	Africa - South/East	
	Ethiopia	Somalia	Somaliland	8°0′5″N 48°0′4″E (disputed)	Africa - North	
	Ethiopia	South Sudan	Sudan	9°30′N 34°6.4′E	Africa - North	
	Guinea	Guinea-Bissau	Senegal	12°41′N 13°43′W	Africa - West/Central	
	Guinea	Liberia	Sierra Leone	8°29′N 10°16′W	Africa - West/Central	
	Guinea	Mali	Senegal	12°25′N 11°22′W	Africa - West/Central	
	Kenya	South Sudan	Uganda	4°13′N 34°0′E	Africa - South/East	
Lake Victoria	Kenya	Tanzania	Uganda	1°0′S 33°55′E	Africa - South/East	
Lake Malawi	Malawi	Mozambique	Tanzania	11°34′S 34°58′E (disputed)	Africa - South/East	
	Malawi	Mozambique	Zambia	14°1′S 33°13′E	Africa - South/East	
	Malawi	Tanzania	Zambia	9°24′S 32°58′E	Africa - South/East	
	Mali	Mauritania	Senegal	14°46′N 12°15′W	Africa - West/Central	
Mpundweni Beacon	Mozambique	South Africa	Eswatini	north: 25°57′S 31°58′E	Africa - South/East	
Abercorn Drift, Maputo River	Mozambique	South Africa	Eswatini	south: 26°50′S 32°8′E	Africa - South/East	
Crook's Corner, Pafuri Triangle (Limpopo–Luvuvhu confluence)	Mozambique	South Africa	Zimbabwe	22°25′17″S 31°18′32″E	Africa - South/East	
	Mozambique	Zambia	Zimbabwe	15°37′S 30°25′E	Africa - South/East	
	Rwanda	Tanzania	Uganda	1°4′S 30°29′E	Africa - South/East	

=== Americas ===
Name / description	Country 1	Country 2	Country 3	Coordinates	Region	Image
Zapaleri	Argentina	Bolivia	Chile	22°48′30″S 67°10′40″W	South	
Hito Esmeralda	Argentina	Bolivia	Paraguay	22°14′S 62°39′W	South	
Triple Frontier	Argentina	Brazil	Paraguay	25°35′33″S 54°35′37″W	South	
Brazilian Island	Argentina	Brazil	Uruguay	30°12′S 57°39′W	South	
Aguas Turbias	Belize	Guatemala	Mexico	17°48′47″N 89°8′54″W	Central	
	Bolivia	Brazil	Paraguay	20°10′S 58°10′W	South	
Assis Brasil / Iñapari / Bolpebra	Bolivia	Brazil	Peru	10°56′27″S 69°34′1″W	South	
Visviri	Bolivia	Chile	Peru	17°30′S 69°29′W	South	
Tres Fronteras	Brazil	Colombia	Peru	04°13′00″S 69°56′00″W	South	
	Brazil	Colombia	Venezuela	1°14′N 66°51′W	South	
	Brazil	French Guiana	Suriname	2°20′N 54°33′W (disputed)	South	
	Brazil	Guyana	Suriname	1°57′N 56°29′W (disputed)	South	
Monte Roraima	Brazil	Guyana	Venezuela	5°12′N 60°44′W	South	
Güeppi Airport	Colombia	Ecuador	Peru	0°7′S 75°15′W	South	
Cerro de Montecristo	El Salvador	Guatemala	Honduras	14°25′18″N 89°21′2″W	Central	

=== Asia ===
Name / description	Country 1	Country 2	Country 3	Coordinates	Region	Image
	Abkhazia	Georgia	Russia	43°12′35″N 42°07′34″E (disputed)	Asia - West	
Chinese: 5587山峰 India claims this portion of Pakistan.	Afghanistan	Pakistan	China	37°2′N 74°34′E (disputed)	Asia - East/Central	Historical Map of Afghanistan China Boundary (tripoint labeled as 5630 (18471)) (1969)
Povalo-Shveikovskogo Peak (Chinese: 波万洛什维科夫斯基峰; pinyin: Bōwànluò Shíwéikēfūsījī Fēng) / Kokrash Kol Peak (Kekelaqukaole Peak; Chinese: 克克拉去考勒峰; pinyin: Kèkèlāqùkǎolè Fēng)	Afghanistan	China	Tajikistan	37°14′N 74°53′E	Asia - East/Central	Historical Map of Afghanistan China Boundary (tripoint labeled as PEAK POVALO SHVEIKOVSKI 5698 (18694)) (1969)
west of the Godzareh Depression	Afghanistan	Iran	Pakistan	29.8610°N 60.8828°E	Asia - West	
	Afghanistan	Iran	Turkmenistan	35°37′N 61°17′E	Asia - West	
	Afghanistan	Tajikistan	Uzbekistan	37°10′N 67°47′E	Asia - East/Central	
	Afghanistan	Turkmenistan	Uzbekistan	37°21′N 66°33′E	Asia - East/Central	
	Armenia	Azerbaijan	Georgia	41°18′07″N 45°00′14″E	Asia - West	
	Armenia	Azerbaijan	Iran	east: 38°52′N 46°32′E west: 38°51′N 46°9′E	Asia - West	
	Armenia	Azerbaijan	Turkey	39°43′N 44°46′E	Asia - West	
	Armenia	Georgia	Turkey	41°8′N 43°28′E	Asia - West	
	Azerbaijan	Georgia	Russia	41°54′44″N 46°25′33″E	Asia - West	
	Azerbaijan	Iran	Turkey	39°38′N 44°49′E	Asia - West	
Caspian Sea	Azerbaijan	Iran	Turkmenistan	38.7°N 51.4°E (disputed)	Asia - West	
Caspian Sea	Azerbaijan	Kazakhstan	Russia	42.8°N 49.9°E (disputed)	Asia - West	
Caspian Sea	Azerbaijan	Kazakhstan	Turkmenistan	41.5°N 51°E (disputed)	Asia - West	
Tin Mukh	Bangladesh	India	Myanmar	21°58′N 92°36′E	Asia - East/Central	
	Bhutan	India	China	west: 27°20′N 88°55′E	Asia - East/Central	
	Bhutan	India	China	east: 27°46′N 91°39′E (disputed)	Asia - East/Central	
Chong Bok	Cambodia	Laos	Thailand	14°20′N 105°13′E	Asia - East/Central	
	Cambodia	Laos	Vietnam	14°41′N 107°33′E	Asia - East/Central	
UN Buffer Zone (de facto)	Cyprus	(United Kingdom) Dhekelia	Northern Cyprus	east: 35°4′N 33°54′E west: 35°1′N 33°41′E	Asia - West	
near Kerem Shalom, Gaza Strip	Egypt	Palestine	Israel	31°13′N 34°16′E (disputed)	Asia - West	
	Georgia	Russia	South Ossetia	east: 42°37′37″N 44°13′56″E (disputed) west: 42°44′44″N 43°47′39″E (disputed)	Asia - West	
near Diphu Pass mountain pass	India	Myanmar	China	28°13′N 97°21′E (disputed)	Asia - East/Central	
	India	Nepal	China	west: 30°12′N 81°2′E (disputed)	Asia - East/Central	
Jongsong Peak	India	Nepal	China	east: 27°53′N 88°8′E	Asia - East/Central	
Siachen Glacier (de facto); Under Pakistan's claim, this tripoint would be at 32°32.2′N 78°23.6′E. Under India's claim there would instead be an Afghanistan-India-Pakistan tripoint at 36°54.7′N 73°40.3′E.	India	Pakistan	China	35.6°N 76.8°E (disputed)	Asia - East/Central	
	Iran	Iraq	Turkey	37°9′N 44°47′E	Asia - West	
	Iraq	Jordan	Saudi Arabia	32°9′N 39°12′E	Asia - West	
Al-Tanf	Iraq	Jordan	Syria	33°22′N 38°48′E	Asia - West	
	Iraq	Kuwait	Saudi Arabia	29°6′N 46°33′E	Asia - West	
	Iraq	Syria	Turkey	37.1116°N 42.3633°E	Asia - West	
Golan Heights	Israel	Jordan	Syria	32°45′N 35°45′E (disputed)	Asia - West	
	Israel	Jordan	Palestine	north: 32°23′N 35°33′E south: 31°30′N 35°29′E (disputed)	Asia - West	
Golan Heights	Israel	Lebanon	Syria	33°20′N 35°46′E (disputed)	Asia - West	
Khan Tengri	Kazakhstan	Kyrgyzstan	China	42°13′N 80°10′E	Asia - East/Central	
	Kazakhstan	Kyrgyzstan	Uzbekistan	42°16′N 70°57′E	Asia - East/Central	
	Kazakhstan	China	Russia	49.0998°N 87.3123°E	Asia - East/Central	
	Kazakhstan	Turkmenistan	Uzbekistan	41°19′N 56°0′E	Asia - West	
near Kurumdy Mountain	Kyrgyzstan	China	Tajikistan	39°28′N 73°36′E	Asia - East/Central	
near Zar-Tash	Kyrgyzstan	Tajikistan	Uzbekistan	40°14′N 70°59′E	Asia - East/Central	
	Laos	Myanmar	China	21°34′N 101°9′E	Asia - East/Central	
Golden Triangle, middle of the Mekong at confluence with Ruak River	Laos	Myanmar	Thailand	20°21′N 100°5′E	Asia - East/Central	
Shiceng Dashan	Laos	China	Vietnam	22°24′N 102°9′E	Asia - East/Central	
Tarbagan-Dakh (Ta'erbagan Dahu, Tarvagan Dakh)	Mongolia	China	Russia	east: 49°50′42.3″N 116°42′46.8″E	Asia - East/Central	
Tavan-Bogdo-Ula (Mt Kuitun 奎屯山, Tavan Bogd Uul)	Mongolia	China	Russia	west: 49°10′13.5″N 87°48′56.3″E	Asia - East/Central	
China–North Korea–Russia tripoint in the middle of the Tumen River near Khasan and Tumangang	North Korea	China	Russia	42°25′N 130°38′E	Asia - East/Central	
	Oman	Saudi Arabia	United Arab Emirates	22°42′N 55°13′E	Asia - West	
	Oman	Saudi Arabia	Yemen	19°N 52°E	Asia - West	

=== Europe ===
Name / description	Country 1	Country 2	Country 3	Coordinates	Region	Image
in Lake Prespa	Albania	Greece	North Macedonia	40°51′06″N 20°59′00″E	Europe - Central	
	Albania	Kosovo	North Macedonia	41°52′39″N 20°35′40″E	Europe - Central	
Tromedja	Albania	Kosovo	Montenegro	42°33′22″N 20°04′43″E	Europe - Central	
Pic de Médécourbe (west)	Andorra	France	Spain	west: 42°36′07″N 01°26′32″E	Europe - West	
	Andorra	France	Spain	east: 42°30′09″N 01°43′28″E	Europe - West	
Šumava National Park / near Nová Pec	Austria	Czech Republic	Germany	48°46′16″N 13°50′22″E	Europe - West	
near Hohenau an der March, in the river Morava	Austria	Czech Republic	Slovakia	48°36′59″N 16°56′24″E	Europe - Central	
in Lake Constance	Austria	Germany	Switzerland	Undecided location, approximately 47°33′N 09°33′E; See Lake Constance#International borders	Europe - West	
near Rajka, Deutsch Jahrndorf, and Čunovo	Austria	Hungary	Slovakia	48°00′24″N 17°09′38″E	Europe - Central	
near Trdkova	Austria	Hungary	Slovenia	46°52′9″N 16°6′49″E	Europe - Central	
Ofen Mountain, near Arnoldstein, or Tromeja	Austria	Italy	Slovenia	46°31′22″N 13°42′51″E	Europe - Central	
near Reschen Pass and Piz Lad	Austria	Italy	Switzerland	46°51′16″N 10°28′08″E	Europe - West	
Feldkirch, in river Rhine	Austria	Liechtenstein	Switzerland	north: 47°16′11″N 09°31′49″E	Europe - West	
Naafkopf	Austria	Liechtenstein	Switzerland	south: 47°3′35″N 09°36′24″E	Europe - West	
in Demene Parish	Belarus	Latvia	Lithuania	55°40′45″N 26°38′0″E	Europe - North/East	
Draudzibas kurgans, in river Sinyaya	Belarus	Latvia	Russia	56°10′13″N 28°09′05″E	Europe - North/East	
in the river Marycha	Belarus	Lithuania	Poland	53°57′17″N 23°31′00″E	Europe - North/East	
in the river Bug, near Tamašoŭka	Belarus	Poland	Ukraine	51°30′17″N 23°37′29″E	Europe - North/East	
Senkivka	Belarus	Russia	Ukraine	52°06′58″N 31°46′50″E	Europe - North/East	
Athus/Rodange	Belgium	France	Luxembourg	49°32′46″N 05°49′05″E	Europe - West	
Ouren, in the river Our	Belgium	Germany	Luxembourg	50°07′47″N 06°08′15″E	Europe - West	
Vaalserberg	Belgium	Germany	Netherlands	50°45′16″N 06°01′15″E	Europe - West	
near Grab	Bosnia and Herzegovina	Croatia	Montenegro	42°33′44″N 18°27′00″E	Europe - Central	
Bijeljina / Jamena, in the river Sava	Bosnia and Herzegovina	Croatia	Serbia	44°51′09″N 19°00′38″E	Europe - Central	
Zelena Glava	Bosnia and Herzegovina	Montenegro	Serbia	43°31′N 19°13′E	Europe - Central	
Tumba Peak (Belasica)	Bulgaria	Greece	North Macedonia	41°20′37″N 22°56′40″E	Europe - Central	
On the Maritsa south of Kapitan Andreevo–Kapıkule	Bulgaria	Greece	Turkey	41°42′43″N 26°21′03″E	Europe - Central	
Shulep Kamak Peak	Bulgaria	North Macedonia	Serbia	42°19′N 22°22′E	Europe - Central	
Timok Mouth into river Danube	Bulgaria	Romania	Serbia	44°13′N 22°41′E	Europe - Central	
	Croatia	Hungary	Serbia	45°55′N 18°49′E	Europe - Central	
	Croatia	Hungary	Slovenia	46°28′N 16°37′E	Europe - Central	
in the river Neisse near Hrádek nad Nisou / Zittau / Porajów	Czech Republic	Germany	Poland	50°52′13″N 14°49′22″E	Europe - West	
Hrčava/Čierne	Czech Republic	Poland	Slovakia	49°31′03″N 18°50′56″E	Europe - Central	
Võru / Alūksne / Pskov districts, in the Pededze river	Estonia	Latvia	Russia	57°31′05″N 27°21′05″E	Europe - North/East	
Muotkavaara / Øvre Pasvik / Rayakoski (Treriksrøysa)	Finland	Norway	Russia	69°3′10″N 28°56′00″E	Europe - North/East	
Treriksröset	Finland	Norway	Sweden	69°03′35″N 20°32′49″E	Europe - North/East	
in river Moselle near Schengen	France	Germany	Luxembourg	49°28′10″N 06°22′02″E	Europe - West	
in river Rhine at Basel, near Dreiländereck	France	Germany	Switzerland	47°35′23″N 07°35′20″E	Europe - West	
Mont Dolent	France	Italy	Switzerland	45°55′21″N 07°02′39″E	Europe - West	
Kübekháza / Beba Veche / Majdan	Hungary	Romania	Serbia	46°8′N 20°16′E	Europe - Central	
Garbolc	Hungary	Romania	Ukraine	47°57′15″N 22°53′46″E	Europe - North/East	
	Hungary	Slovakia	Ukraine	48°24′12″N 22°09′19″E	Europe - North/East	
	Kosovo	North Macedonia	Serbia	42°16′N 21°35′E	Europe - Central	
	Kosovo	Montenegro	Serbia	42°50′N 20°21′E	Europe - Central	
at Wiżajny, Suwałki County	Lithuania	Poland	Russia	54°21′45″N 22°47′26″E	Europe - North/East	
	Moldova	Romania	Ukraine	north: 48°15′35″N 26°37′49″E	Europe - North/East	
	Moldova	Romania	Ukraine	south: 45°28′00″N 28°12′48″E	Europe - North/East	
	Moldova	Transnistria	Ukraine	north: 48°08′17″N 28°31′15″E (disputed) south: 46°32′55″N 29°53′39″E (disputed)	Europe - North/East	
Kremenec	Poland	Slovakia	Ukraine	49°05′14″N 22°33′47″E	Europe - North/East	

== See also ==
- List of tripoints of England
- List of tripoints of U.S. states
- Quadripoint
- Tri-cities, for examples of cities within a country's borders.
