= Climate change in Botswana =

Climate change in Botswana refers to changes in the climate in Botswana and the subsequent response, adaptation and mitigation strategies of the country. It is expected to lead to increased intensity of droughts and increased frequencies this is due to shorter rainy seasons and fewer rainy days. Due to fluctuation on climate and weather the country may sometimes experience heavy destructive rains.

== Climate of Botswana ==
Climate of Botswana Classifications zones

The climate of Botswana is arid to semi-arid with warm winters and hot summers and the rainfalls are highly unpredictable. Rains mostly occur from October to April. The winter season is mostly dry and sunny, mild during the day but cold at night, especially in the center and south of the country. This is normally around the months of May to August. The summer season which is normally from November to March, is hot and moderately rainy. There is plenty of sunshine during this season, especially in the mornings. Over the course of the year, the temperature typically varies from 41 °F to 89 °F and is rarely below 34 °F or above 97 °F. The heat is often intense in spring around September and October, especially in the northern part of the country, however, hot days are possible throughout the country from September to April.

The south-west region is the driest area, this is where the Kalahari desert is found and precipitation drops below 300 millimeters (12 inches) per year. The wettest areas, where more than 500 mm (20 in) of rainfall per year, are the north and the south-east, where Gaborone is located. The country is landlocked and has a subtropical desert climate characterized by a great difference between day and night temperatures and overall humidity.

Botswana is considered very vulnerable to climate change and variability due to its low rainfall as well as the high rate of poverty that affects mostly rural areas. Botswana experiences low rainfall and the rainfall patterns change which negatively affects the agricultural sector. Due to the state of rainfall in Botswana, which is very unreliable, there has been a reduction in hectares ploughed. Heavy rains wash away the topsoil and seeds during the ploughing season and this results in very low yields.

Botswana's vulnerability to climate change is affected mostly by its dependence on the sectors that are easily affected by climate change; tourism, agriculture, water and health. Poverty is also another aspect that is mostly brought along by the dependence on these sectors.

== Key trends ==
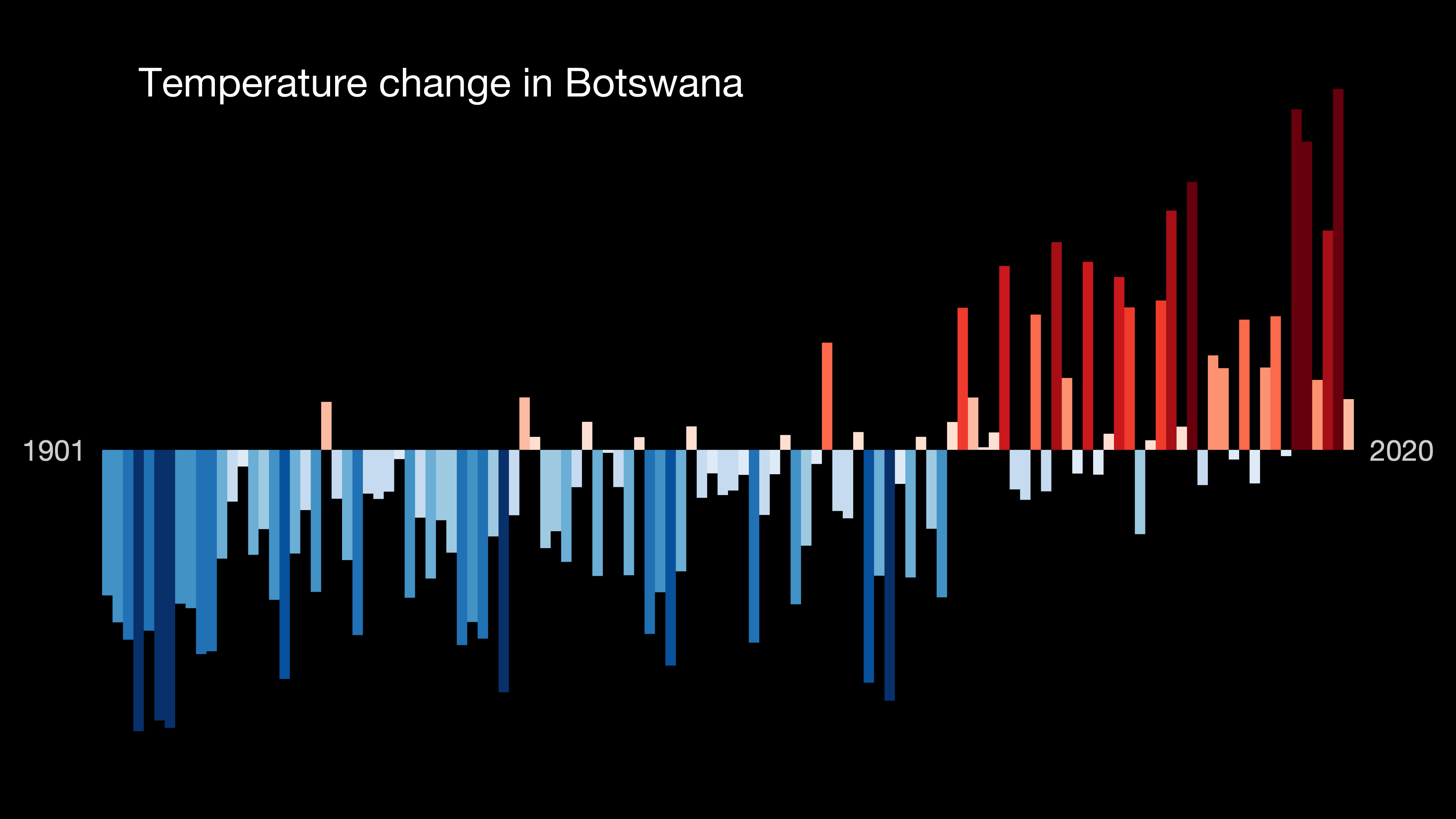
Botswana's temperature trends between 1901 and 2020

Average temperatures have increased at 1.5 °C since the 1900s. The image on the right shows the Botswana's temperature trends between the year 1901 and the year 2020. The largest changes are in November and March. Botswana experience very hot temperatures during summer which ranges from November to March of which they can go as high as 38 °C in some parts of the country while winter which ranges from March to August are very cold at night and mild during the day, sometimes with common bitterly so-frost which can freeze small quantity of water. In spring which is from September to October the country experiences very high temperatures which can go as high as 44 °C in most parts of the country.

Botswana has received below-normal rainfall and more frequent droughts. Wet days in Botswana varies throughout the year. A wet day is measured at 1.0 millimetre (0.04 inches) of liquid precipitation. The wetter season last from October to April with 21% chance of a day being a wet day while the winter season last from April to October, July being a month with the fewest wet days with an average of 0.2 days with at least an average of 1.0 millimetre (0.04 inches) of precipitation. December is recorded as a month with the highest rainfall.

Botswana's annual greenhouse gas emissions as at 2019 stand at 11,000.00 kt of CO_{2}, which was a 13.25% decline from the previous year, 2018. The carbon dioxide emissions are mostly from fossil fuels; natural gas, oil, transport and buildings, the power industry also contribute to these emissions.

== Impacts of climate change ==
Climate change is already having visible effects on the world, the earth is warming, the rainfall patterns are always changing, and sea levels are rising and these changes increase the risk of heatwaves, floods, droughts, and fires. Climate change and its interactions with other stressors have affected biodiversity and the species with small distribution, low abundance and specialised habitats are predominantly vulnerable.

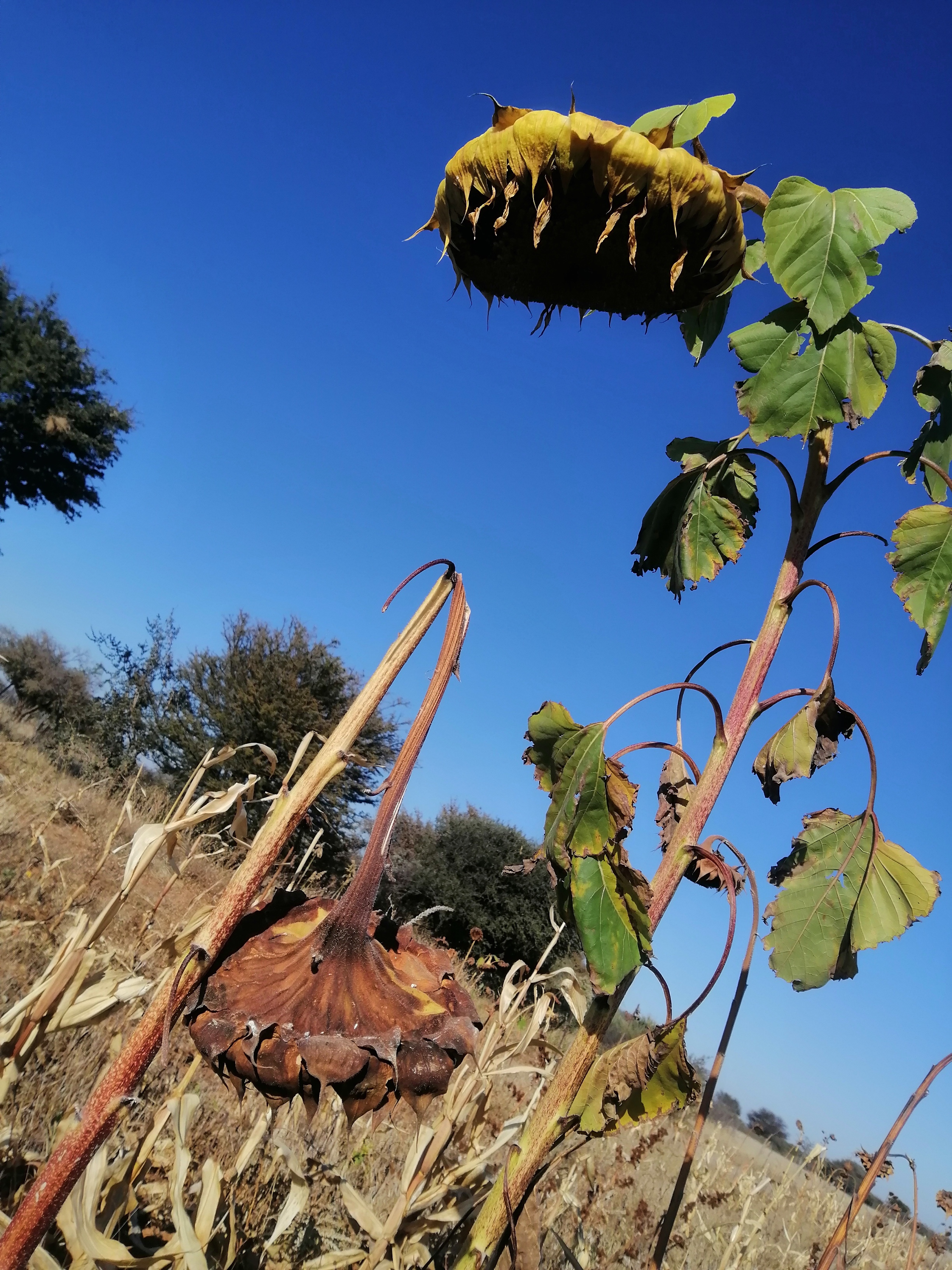
Sunflower plant during the winter season in Kanngwe, Botswana.

Climate change, which comes with higher temperatures, land and water scarcity, flooding, drought and displacement, has negatively impacted the agricultural production and caused a lot of food insecurity. These has mostly affected vulnerable people putting them at the risk of hunger and food insecurity.

Currently, about 30% of the population of Botswana is exposed to the risk of malaria infection each and every year and the majority of cases occur in the northern districts with Bobonong, Tutume, Serowe, Phalapye and Boteti being in transition zone of malaria. During the years of heavy rain for the risk of malaria shift westwards and Southwards. Diarrheal case incidence comes with a bimodal cyclical pattern with peaks in March (ANOVA p < 0.001) and October (ANOVA p < 0.001) in the wet and dry season respectively. There is a strong positive auto-correlation (p < 0.001) in the number of reported diarrhea cases at the one-month lag level. Climatic variables (rainfall, minimum temperature, and vapor pressure) predicted seasonal diarrheal with a one-month lag in variables (p < 0.001). Diarrheal case incidence was highest in the dry season after accounting for other variables, exhibiting on average a 20% increase over the yearly mean (p < 0.001)

There are many causes for the differences in the impacts of climate change being experienced by both men and women this difference is range from psychological political economic and societal differences. Most sustainable arable farmers however are women who farmed to improve their household food security despite the increased role and agricultural production most women do not have control over land and lack access to agricultural extensions and credit. The numerous pages of the HIV pandemic have contributed to the limited access to productive resources services and skills all these factors make women particularly vulnerable to the impacts of climate change. Across the cities the impacts of climate change affect women and men differently. Women and girls experience the greatest impacts of climate change, which amplifies existing gender inequalities and poses unique threats to their livelihoods, health, and safety.

== Climate finance ==
Botswana intends to reduce overall emissions by 15% from the base year of 2010 by 2038 at an anticipated cost of 18.4 billion US dollars. This emissions reduction target was estimated based on baseline GHGs inventory for the three GHGs being CO_{2}, CH_{4} and N_{2}O. Covering energy, waste, and agriculture sectors. This calculation does not include CH_{4} emissions from livestock farming, mostly from enteric fermentation, however, the country aims to implement mitigation measures for this sector.

In the 2020s, Conservation International Botswana was associated with the Green Climate Fund project Ecosystem-based adaptation and mitigation in Botswana's communal rangelands, for which Conservation International is the accredited entity. The project focuses on communal rangelands in Ngamiland, Bobirwa and Kgalagadi.
