= Olifants River =

Olifants River may refer to any of the following rivers in Southern Africa:

- Olifants River (Western Cape), draining in the Atlantic Ocean. Located in the southwestern area of the Western Cape Province
- Olifants River (Southern Cape), part of the Gourits River System flowing through the Klein Karoo. Located in the southern area of the Western Cape Province
- Olifants River (Limpopo), a tributary of the Limpopo River flowing through Mpumalanga and Limpopo provinces (South Africa) and Gaza Province (Mozambique)
- Olifants River, Namibia, a tributary of the Auob River
