= Shiceng Dashan =

Mountain on the Laos–China-Vietnam border

Shiceng Dashan/Thập Tầng Đại San
- Khoan La San
- Location within Laos

Highest point
- Elevation: 1,866 m (6,122 ft)
- Listing: List of tripoints
- Coordinates: 22°23′59″N 102°08′38″E

Geography
- Location: China - Laos – Vietnam border
- Parent range: Annamite Range

Climbing
- First ascent: Unknown

Shiceng Dashan (simplified Chinese: 十层大山; traditional Chinese: 十層大山; pinyin: Shícéng Dàshān, Sino-Vietnamese: Thập Tầng Đại Sơn or Thập Tầng Đại San, Vietnamese: Khoan La San) is a mountain at the junction of the borders of Laos, China and Vietnam. Its name means "Ten-layer great mountain".

There is a monolith at the top marking the tripoint spot, made of granite, with the emblem of the three countries on it. The monolith was placed on the 27th of June, 2006, being 1,6 meters tall, with its base being 0,4 meters tall.
