= Maun Senior Secondary School =

Coordinates: 20.00938°S 23.42731°E

- Maun; Botswana

Information
- Type: Government school
- Established: 1970
- Principal: Mrs Legwale
- Grades: Form 4 (Grade 11), Form 5 (Grade 12)
- Gender: Co-educational

Maun Senior Secondary School is a government-run boarding school located in Maun, Botswana, the fifth largest town in Botswana. It was the first secondary school in the district.

== History ==
=== Establishment ===
Missionaries from the United Congregation Church of Southern Africa founded the school in 1970. The first class contained 70 students. In 2017, 2,000 students attended the school.

=== Special Education: the Deaf and Hard of Hearing ===
The school admitted its first cohort of deaf students in 2004.

=== 2012 Arson Incident ===
In 2012, a fire damaged several school classrooms, including the original classroom built in 1970. Persons claiming to be students of the school set the fire as a means to pressure the administration to terminate the employment of male teaching staff they reported were involved in love affairs with female students. This caused such panic among students, especially those in boarding, as to precipitate the temporary shutdown of the school.

== Multiple Pathways ==
In 2021, the school adopted the Multiple Pathways approach, with support from the European Union Technical Vocational Education and Training (TVET) programme. This approach integrates technical education into the students' general education curriculum. It was strategically deployed as Maun is a tourism hub, often referred to as the tourism capital of Botswana.

== Athletics ==
Maun Secondary has traditionally performed well at the Botswana Independent Sports Association finals, winning 31 medals in 2019 and several of its students have set national records at the finals event.

== See also ==
- Education in Botswana
