= Union's End =

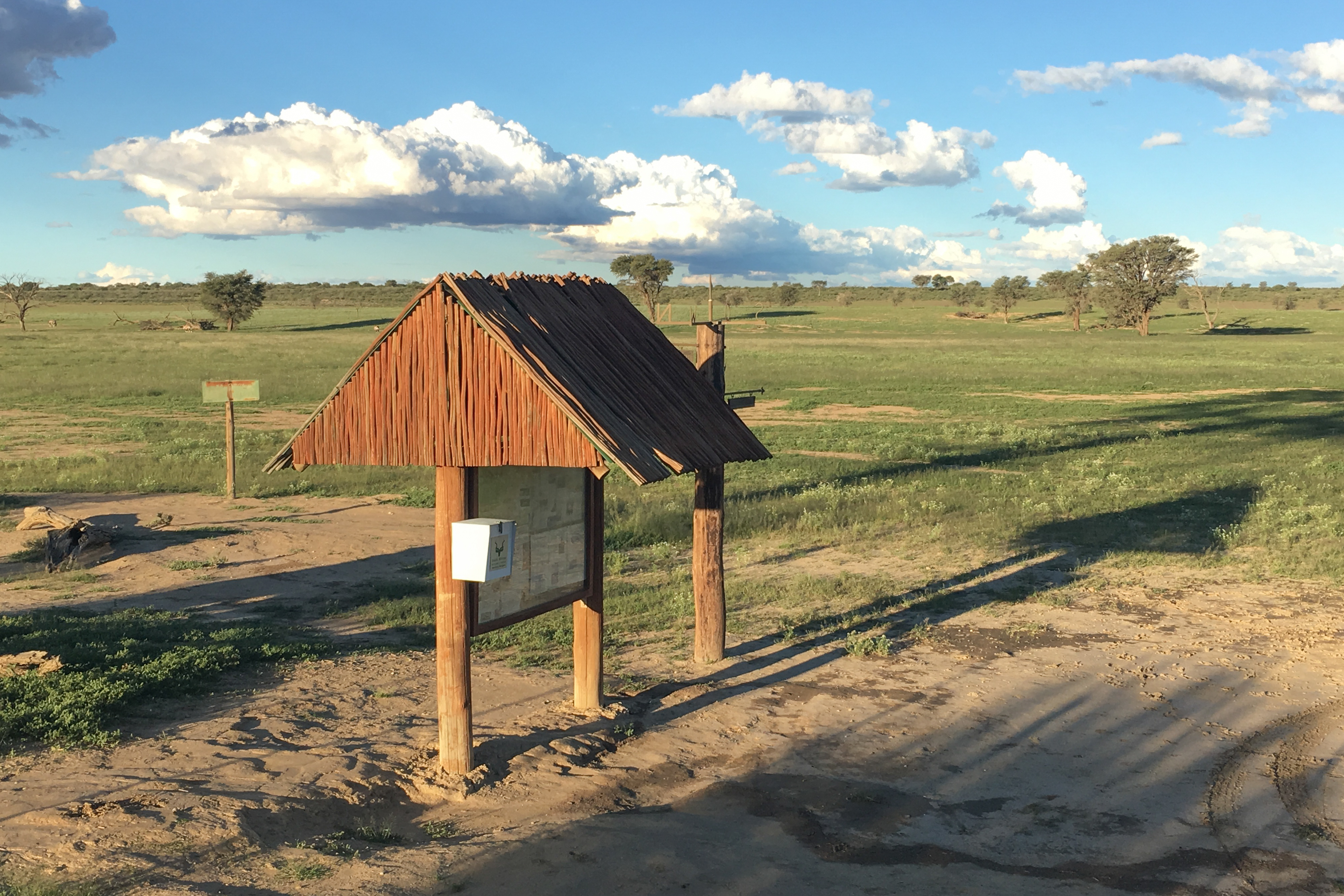
Notice board at the picnic site

Union's End is the northwesternmost point in South Africa and the northernmost point of the Northern Cape as well as of Dawid Kruiper Local Municipality and ZF Mgcawu District Municipality within this province. It is the point where the borders of South Africa, Namibia, and Botswana intersect.

Where the Nossob River flowing from the northwest (from Gobabis, Leonardville, and Aranos) crosses the 20th meridian of longitude east of Greenwich (the eastern border of Namibia), the tripoint lies in the middle of the dry riverbed. It is located in Kgalagadi Transfrontier Park, where beacons indicate the borders with Botswana and South Africa. On the Namibian side of the border are farms, and since 1966, a straight fence has spanned the border. The name of the point dates to the Union of South Africa.

A picnic table, information board (under a reed-thatched roof) and more directions can be found at 24°45′55.3″S 19°59′58.7″E. It lies around 555 km from Upington (6 hours' drive), 284 km from Twee Rivieren Restcamp, and 25 km from Grootkolk Wilderness Camp.

== Sources ==
- Green, Lawrence G. To the river's end. Cape Town: Timmins, 1948.
