= Maun, Botswana =

Maun
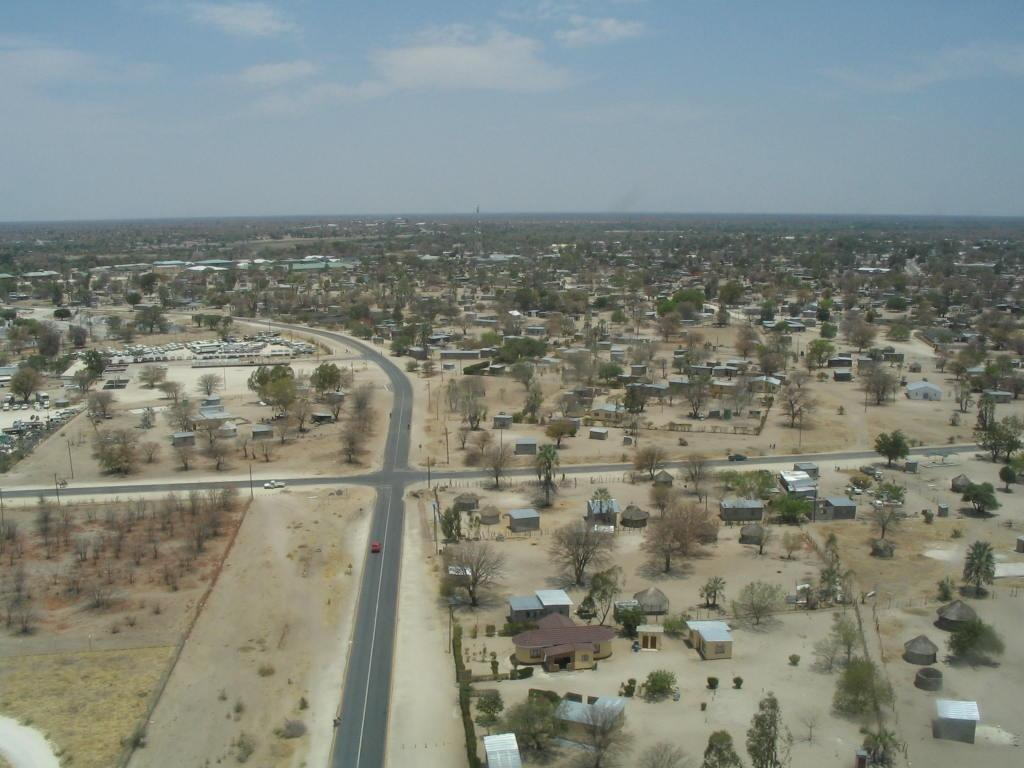
- Maun from the air

- Location within Botswana
- Coordinates: 19°59′S 023°25′E
- Country: Botswana
- District: North-West District
- Founded: 1915
- Elevation: 927 m (3,041 ft)

Population (2022)
  - Total: 85,293
- ISO 3166 code: BW-NW
- Climate: BSh

Maun is the second-largest village in Botswana. As of 2022, it had a population of 85,293. Maun is the "tourism capital" of Botswana and the administrative centre of Ngamiland district. Francistown and Maun are linked by the A3 highway. Maun is also the headquarters of numerous safari and air-charter operations who run trips into the Okavango Delta.

Although officially still a village, Maun has developed rapidly from a rural frontier town and spread along the Thamalakane River. It now has shopping centres, hotels and lodges as well as car hire services, although it retains a rural atmosphere and local tribesmen continue to bring their cattle to Maun to sell. The community is distributed along the wide banks of the Thamalakane where red lechwe can still be seen grazing next to local donkeys, goats and cattle.

== History ==
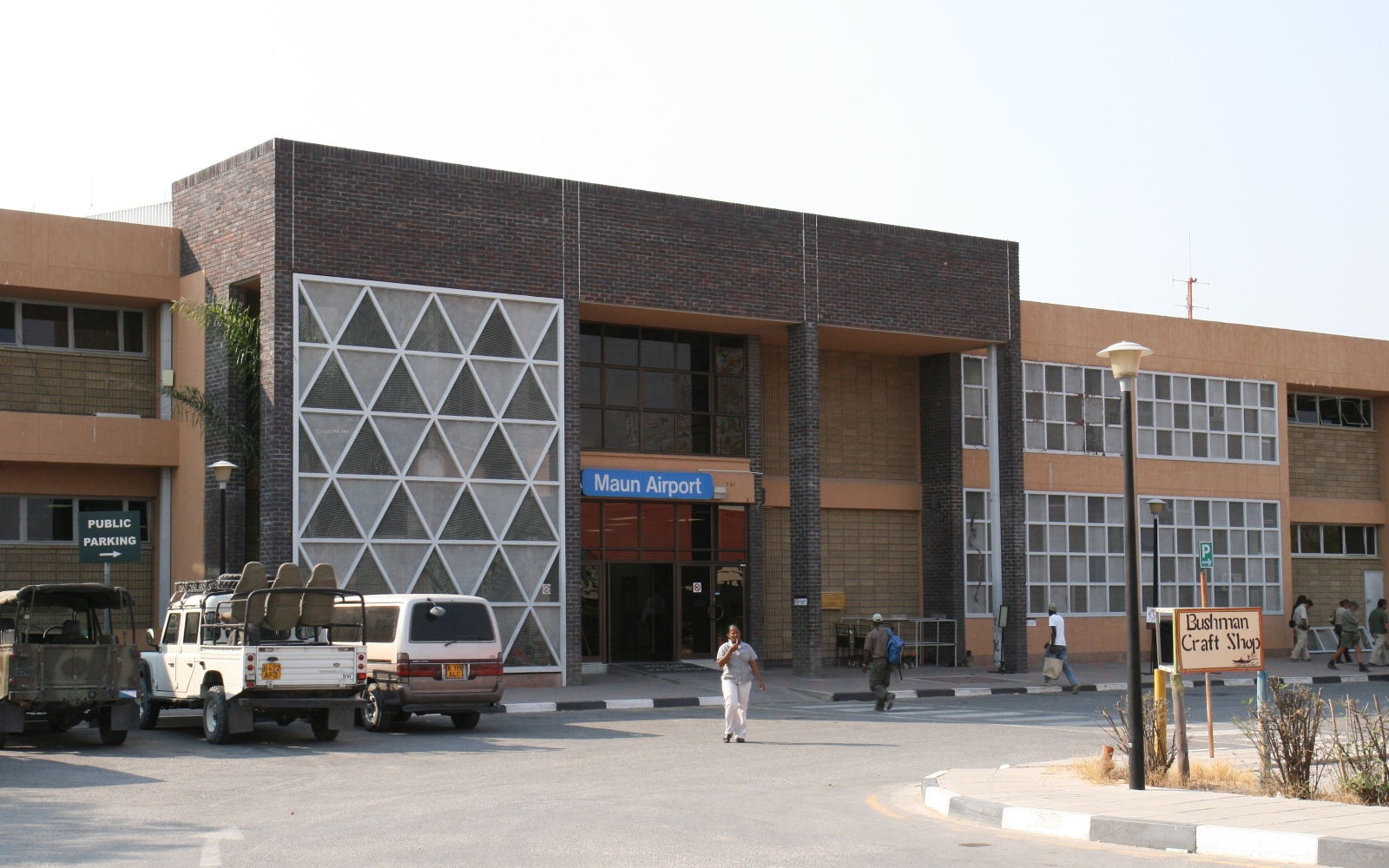

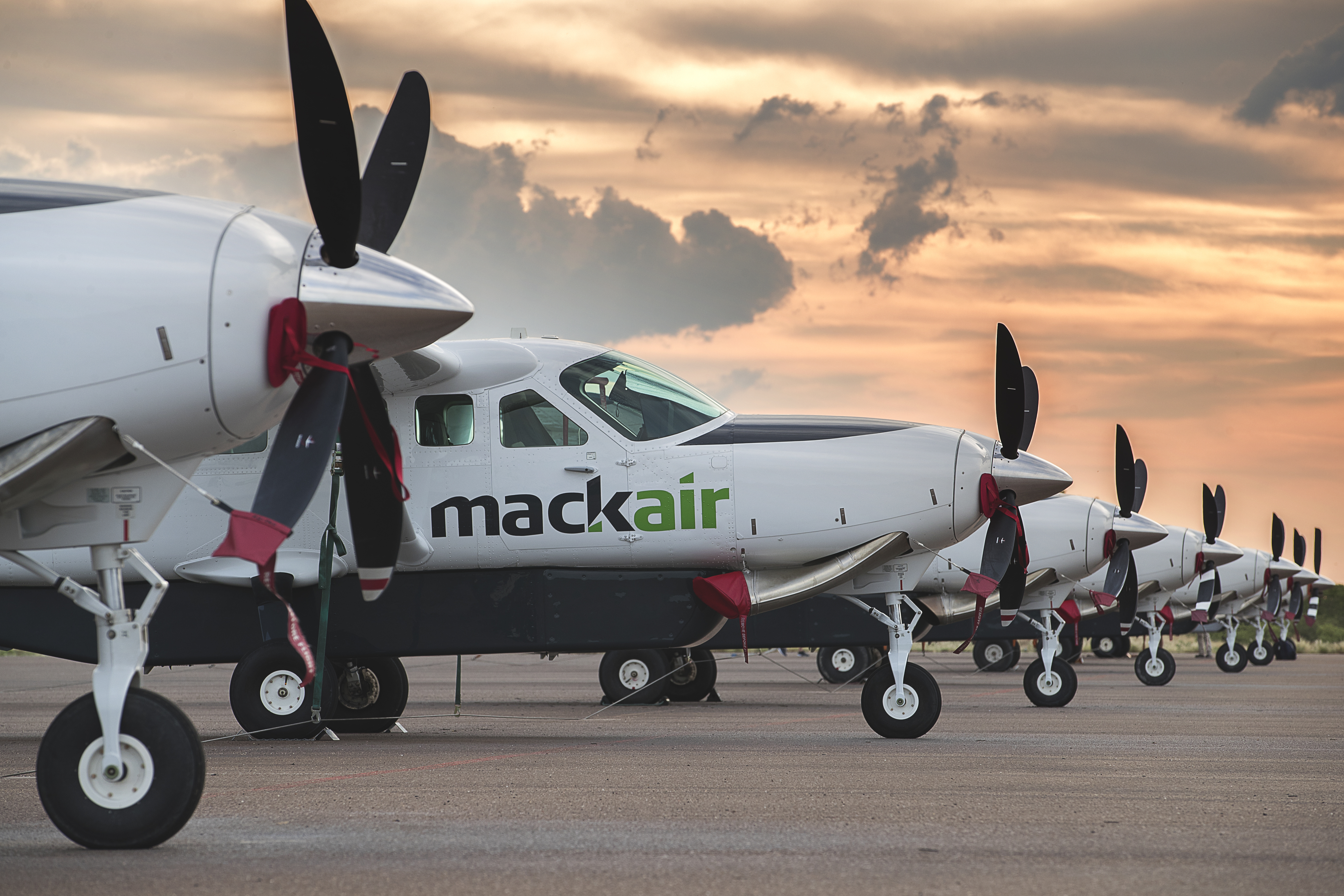
Maun Airport (top) and Mack Air aircraft at Maun Airport (bottom).

The settlement was founded in 1915 as the tribal capital of the Batawana people, and has had a reputation as a hard-living 'Wild West' town which was the economic center of local cattle ranching and hunting operations. However, with the growth of the tourism industry and the completion of the tar road from Nata in the early 1990s, Maun has developed swiftly, losing much of its old town character. It is now home to over 85,000 people.

In 1993, Conservation International opened an office in Maun as part of its CI-Okavango programme, which later formed the basis of the Botswana country programme Conservation International Botswana.

Maun is today a tourist town, infamous for its infestation of donkeys and to a lesser extent goats. These animals can be seen standing around town as the local farmers arrive in innumerable taxis to sell their wares on the curbside.

With the influx of tourism dollars, the typical traditional rondavels have been replaced by square, cinderblock homes roofed with tin and occasionally tiles. Mobile phone service in Maun is excellent out to about 20 to 25 kilometres (12 to 16 mi), depending on weather.

Maun is also becoming a regional transshipment hub for materials and tradespeople who service both the local camps and safari centres and the burgeoning mineral exploration camps in northwestern Botswana. There are a wide variety of services in stores as well as many local entrepreneurs with welding ventures operated from the back of a cart.

Tourists fly into the Maun International Airport. Often, these tourists hire fully equipped 4x4 cars for camping and game viewing in the parks, or fly to several tourist camps in the Okavango Delta or the Makgadikgadi.

== Climate ==
Maun has a hot semi-arid climate (Köppen climate classification BSh). On 7 January 2016, Maun had a record temperature of 44.0 °C (111.2 °F), which is the highest temperature to have ever been recorded in Botswana.

Climate data for Maun
Month	Jan	Feb	Mar	Apr	May	Jun	Jul	Aug	Sep	Oct	Nov	Dec	Year
Record high °C (°F)	44.0 (111.2)	39.4 (102.9)	39.5 (103.1)	37.2 (99.0)	35.6 (96.1)	33.3 (91.9)	32.2 (90.0)	36.1 (97.0)	38.6 (101.5)	42.8 (109.0)	43.3 (109.9)	42.2 (108.0)	44.0 (111.2)
Mean daily maximum °C (°F)	31.5 (88.7)	31.3 (88.3)	31.0 (87.8)	30.5 (86.9)	27.9 (82.2)	25.2 (77.4)	25.4 (77.7)	28.5 (83.3)	32.3 (90.1)	34.6 (94.3)	33.6 (92.5)	32.2 (90.0)	30.3 (86.5)
Daily mean °C (°F)	25.4 (77.7)	25.1 (77.2)	24.2 (75.6)	22.6 (72.7)	18.7 (65.7)	15.7 (60.3)	15.8 (60.4)	18.8 (65.8)	23.1 (73.6)	26.6 (79.9)	26.4 (79.5)	25.8 (78.4)	22.4 (72.3)
Mean daily minimum °C (°F)	19.4 (66.9)	18.9 (66.0)	17.5 (63.5)	14.6 (58.3)	9.5 (49.1)	6.2 (43.2)	6.2 (43.2)	9.2 (48.6)	14.0 (57.2)	18.5 (65.3)	19.3 (66.7)	19.3 (66.7)	14.4 (57.9)
Record low °C (°F)	8.9 (48.0)	8.9 (48.0)	10.0 (50.0)	3.3 (37.9)	−1.7 (28.9)	−6.4 (20.5)	−5.3 (22.5)	−4.4 (24.1)	−0.6 (30.9)	6.1 (43.0)	9.4 (48.9)	11.1 (52.0)	−6.4 (20.5)
Average precipitation mm (inches)	104 (4.1)	95 (3.7)	81 (3.2)	25 (1.0)	5 (0.2)	1 (0.0)	0.5 (0.02)	0 (0)	1 (0.0)	17 (0.7)	43 (1.7)	81 (3.2)	452 (17.8)
Average precipitation days (≥ 0.1 mm)	13	12	8	5	1	0	0	0	0	3	9	10	61
Average relative humidity (%)	60	60	60	51	48	49	45	38	32	34	43	52	48
Mean monthly sunshine hours	263.5	209.1	257.3	279.0	313.1	300.0	306.9	331.7	306.0	297.6	261.0	244.9	3,370.1
Mean daily sunshine hours	8.5	7.4	8.3	9.3	10.1	10.0	9.9	10.7	10.2	9.6	8.7	7.9	9.3
Source: Deutscher Wetterdienst, (January record only)

== Etymology ==
The name Maun is derived from the Seyei word 'maung', which translates 'the place of river reeds'. Before the arrival of Batawana, Maun was a small Yei village. The village in 1915 became the capital for the Batawana people. The capital was transferred from Toteng after victory over Ndebele King Lobengula.

== Commercial development ==
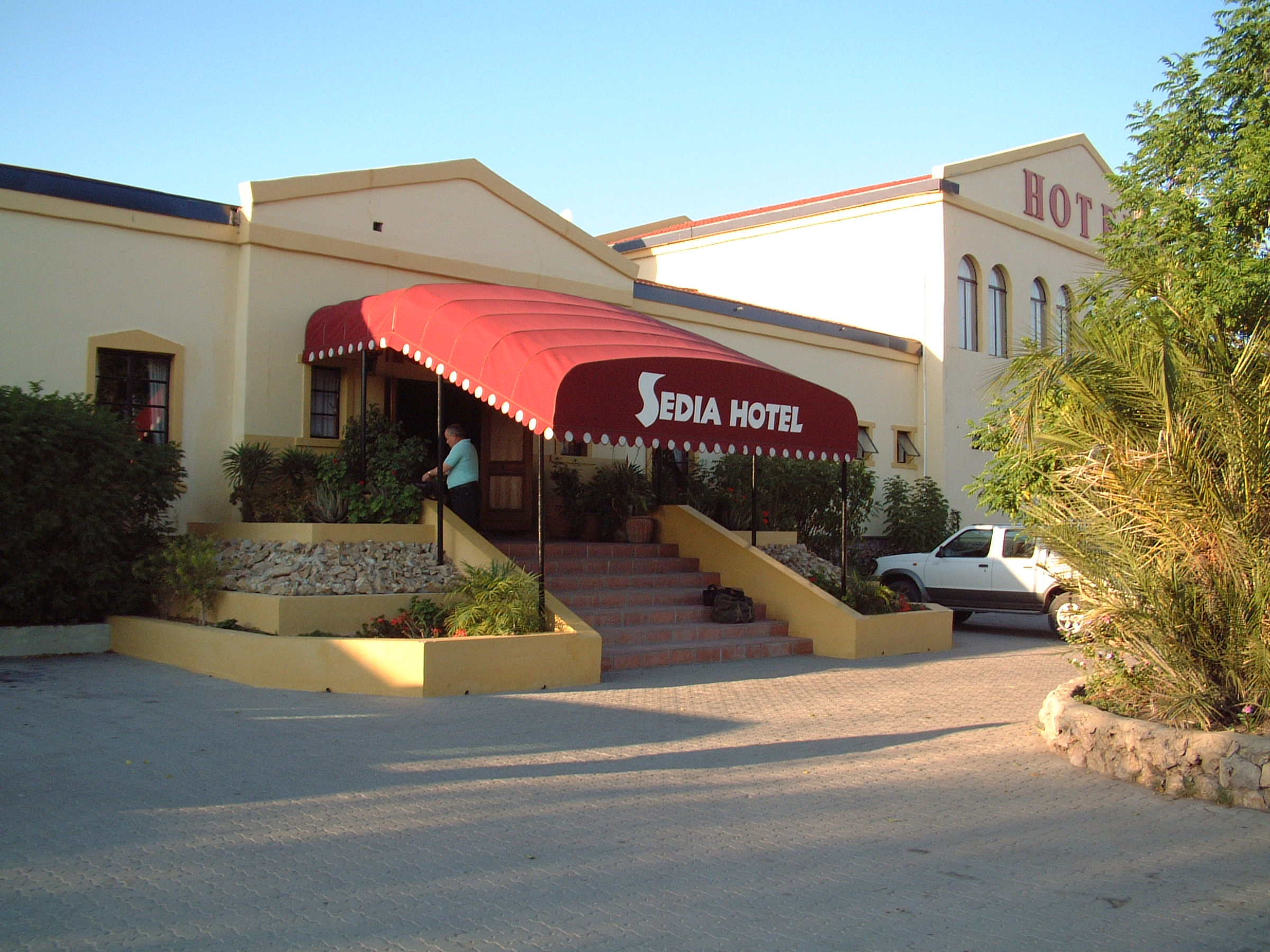
Sedia Hotel in Maun

Maun is a gateway for exploring much of northern Botswana; it is the hub for visitors from outside the region to explore the Tsodilo Hills and the Makgadikgadi Pans. The Thamalakane River discharges to the Boteti River, whose seasonal high flow reaches the Makgadikgadi.

In 2011, Maun had branches of Barclays Bank, First National Bank Botswana, Stanbic Bank and Standard Chartered Bank with ATM facility. Maun has three main hotels; Sedia Riverside Hotel, Riley's Hotel and Maun Lodge. There are many other accommodations and campsites, oriented towards the safari business like Okavango River Lodge, Thamalakane Lodge, the old Bridge Backpackers and others.

== Education ==
Maun Senior Secondary School is located in Maun.

== Healthcare ==
The Letsholathe II Memorial Hospital is the main referral hospital in Maun. Another one, Maun Private Hospital, located on the Sedia road, opened to the public in July 2021.

== Sports ==
Maun hosts the Sankoyo Bush Bucks, a football (soccer) team promoted to the Botswana Premier League in 2013–14.

== In popular culture ==
The Top Gear: Botswana Special (episode 4 of series 10), which aired in 2007, includes segments in Maun. Maun was featured again in the series finale of The Grand Tour in 2024, during which Jeremy Clarkson's Lancia Beta and James May's Mercedes-Benz 230E from the special were present, having been found a few years earlier.

The sixth and seventh legs of the 22nd installment of the American television program The Amazing Race took place in and around Maun.

The music video for "Am I Wrong" by Nico & Vinz, was filmed in Maun, as well as in Victoria Falls, Zimbabwe.

The 2012 TV series Bush Pilots was filmed in Maun.
