= Betoukoumba =

- Location on the Republic of the Congo – Central African Republic border
- Coordinates: 3°25′48″N 18°35′49″E
- Country: Republic of the Congo
- Department: Likouala

Betoukoumba is a village in the Republic of the Congo. It sits on the border of the Central African Republic and is less than one kilometre from the geographical tripoint between the Republic of the Congo, the Central African Republic, and the Democratic Republic of the Congo.
