= Auob River =

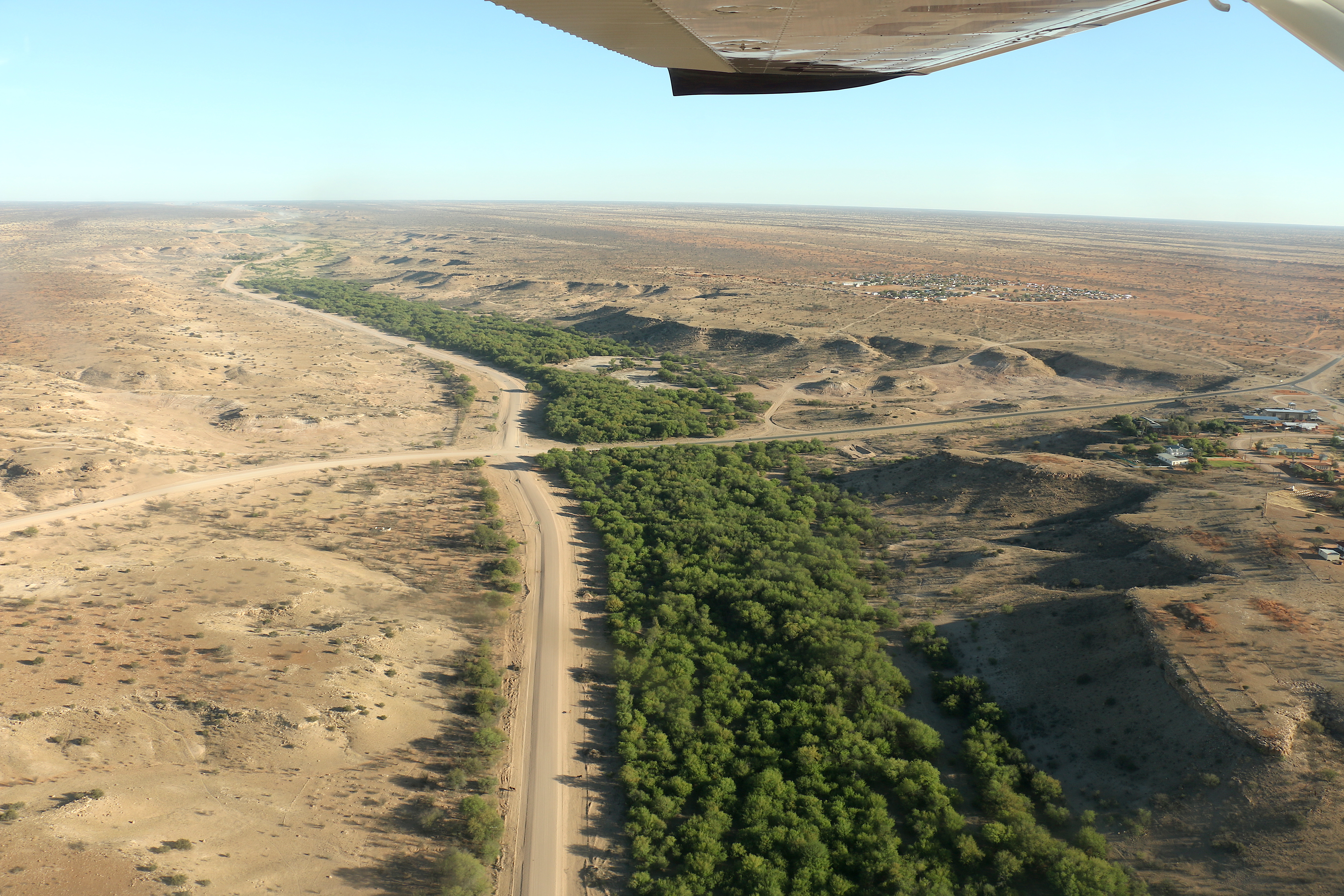
- The Auob River at Gochas

Location
- Countries: Namibia; South Africa

Physical characteristics
- Source: Tributaries east of Windhoek
- Mouth: Nossob River
  - elevation: 897 m

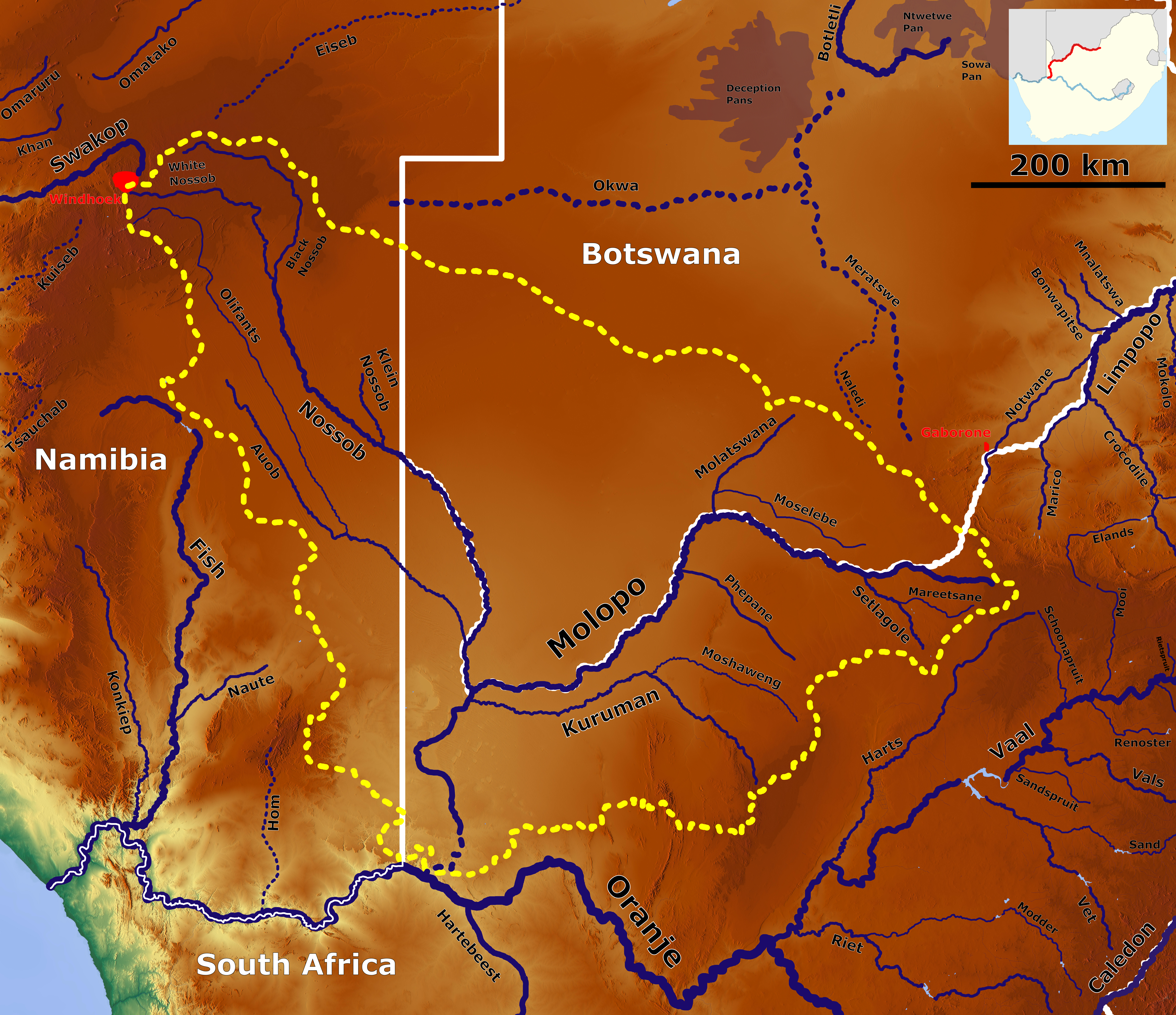
The Auob in the Molopo catchment area (center left)

The Auob River is a river in the Northern Cape province of South Africa and the Hardap Region of Namibia. It flows through the Kgalagadi Transfrontier Park. It is a tributary of the Nossob River.

== Route ==
The river flows about 400 kilometres (250 miles) southeastward through Namibia and Northern Cape.

=== Headwaters ===
- 22.6514°S 17.286°E in Namibia

=== Mouth ===
- 26.4333°S 20.6167°E, Nossob River
