= Conservation International Botswana =

Botswana programme of Conservation International

- Abbreviation: CI Botswana
- Formation: 1993
- Type: Country programme
- Headquarters: Gaborone, Botswana
- Region served: Botswana
- Fields: Biodiversity conservation; protected areas; human-wildlife coexistence; climate resilience
- Parent organization: Conservation International
- Website: botswana.conservation.org

Conservation International Botswana (CI Botswana) is the Botswana country programme of Conservation International. Conservation International began working in Botswana in 1993 through its CI-Okavango programme.

CI Botswana has operated programmes in the Okavango Delta region involving environmental education, policy dialogue, enterprise development and ecotourism, and wildlife research and monitoring such as aerial wildlife surveys and rapid biological appraisal work. It has also participated in initiatives on human-wildlife coexistence and conservation corridors in northern and western Botswana. In the 2020s, its programme work included an ecosystem-based adaptation and mitigation project in Botswana's communal rangelands supported through the Green Climate Fund (GCF).

== Overview ==
CI Botswana is headquartered in Gaborone and maintains offices in Maun and Bobonong.

The Okavango Delta programme has been described as an integrated effort involving environmental education, policy dialogue, enterprise development and ecotourism, and research and monitoring, operating with local governance supported by a national advisory council chaired by a cabinet-level minister. CI Botswana has also participated in projects on human–wildlife coexistence and conservation corridors in northern and western Botswana.

== History ==
Conservation International began working in Botswana in 1993 and opened an office in Maun as part of its CI-Okavango programme.

In 1997, Namibia proposed to fast-track a pipeline to supply Windhoek with water from the Okavango River. Conservation International said the timetable had been accelerated and supported calls for the Okavango River Basin Water Commission (OKACOM) to require full environmental and social impact studies before the project proceeded.

In the early 2000s, the CI-Okavango programme received Development Grant Facility grants (2000–2003) for work in the Okavango Delta region, alongside other donor funding.

Work associated with the Okavango Delta programme later included participation in initiatives on human–wildlife coexistence and conservation corridors, and in the 2020s included a communal-rangelands programme supported through the Green Climate Fund.

In the late 2000s, CI Botswana took part in coordination and information-sharing forums linked to the Northern Botswana Human Wildlife Coexistence Project and worked with the Department of Wildlife and National Parks (DWNP) on the Western Kgalagadi Conservation Corridor project.

In 2021, the Green Climate Fund approved the project Ecosystem-based adaptation and mitigation in Botswana's communal rangelands, with Conservation International Foundation as the accredited entity; implementation began on 1 December 2021 and the project was publicly launched in Tsabong in May 2025.

== Programmes and operations ==
Selected programme locations in Botswana (1 Gaborone; 2 Maun; 3 Bobonong; 4 Makgadikgadi Pans; 5 Kwando River corridor; 6 Western Kgalagadi Conservation Corridor; 7 Okavango Delta (Shorobe); 8 Tsabong (communal rangelands project launch))

=== National ===
CI Botswana's national programme includes work on the Green Climate Fund (GCF) project Ecosystem-based adaptation and mitigation in Botswana's communal rangelands, a cross-cutting adaptation and mitigation programme focused on restoring and managing communal grazing vegetation to improve livestock and rangeland drought resilience while increasing soil carbon and reducing greenhouse gas emissions. Activities in communal rangelands in Ngamiland, Bobirwa and Kgalagadi include rotational grazing and other rangeland-restoration measures such as borehole rehabilitation and reseeding. The project was publicly launched in Tsabong in May 2025.

=== Okavango Delta region ===
CI Botswana's Okavango Delta programme has included environmental education, policy dialogue, support for enterprise development and ecotourism, and research and monitoring activities such as aerial wildlife surveys and rapid biological appraisals used to compile baseline information on ecosystems and wildlife movements. The programme has been described as locally managed by country staff and stakeholders and guided by a national advisory council chaired by a cabinet-level minister, with participation from government representatives and other stakeholder groups.

Education and community initiatives linked to the programme have included a learning and resource centre at the Maun Wildlife Educational Park, curriculum materials developed with the Ministry of Education and Skills Development to integrate environmental education in schools, annual wilderness camps for children from village communities in and around the delta, and support for community basketry enterprises. CI Botswana also participated in coordination and information-sharing forums associated with the Northern Botswana Human Wildlife Coexistence Project.

=== Makgadikgadi Pans ===
CI Botswana has supported wildlife research and monitoring in the Makgadikgadi Pans ecosystem. Research and monitoring in the Makgadikgadi region has included aerial wildlife surveys and studies of zebra distribution and seasonal movements, including a long-distance migration between the Okavango Delta and the Makgadikgadi grasslands.

=== Kwando River corridor ===
Border fences and veterinary cordon fences (disease-control cordons) are used to keep wildlife and cattle separated to limit disease transmission. In the Kwando River wildlife dispersal area, a major cordon sanitaire (veterinary fence) separates Namibia from Botswana and restricts wildlife movement along parts of the Botswana–Namibia border. Analysis of GPS tracking data from more than 100 collared elephants in the Kavango–Zambezi Transfrontier Conservation Area found that border-fence segments between Namibia and Botswana were an impenetrable boundary for female elephants and limited cross-border movements in some areas, while male elephants crossed more often. CI Botswana has engaged with government on veterinary-cordon-fence issues and wildlife connectivity, including work linked to a 40-km wildlife corridor at the Kwando River. The programme has been associated with stakeholder discussions and recommendations on veterinary and game fencing in northern Botswana, including calls for environmental assessment and audit work related to fencing in the Okavango region.

=== Western Kgalagadi Conservation Corridor ===
CI Botswana worked with DWNP on the Western Kgalagadi Conservation Corridor project, described as a corridor linking Kgalagadi Transfrontier Park and the Central Kalahari Game Reserve and associated with wildlife access to resources, community development and tourism in the corridor area. The Western Kalahari Conservation Corridor Project mapped major wildlife habitats, movement routes and corridors in the Kalahari ecosystem linking Kgalagadi Transfrontier Park and the Central Kalahari Game Reserve, and attempted to identify and support community projects related to corridor maintenance; the project closed in 2010.

Programme landscapes of Conservation International Botswana
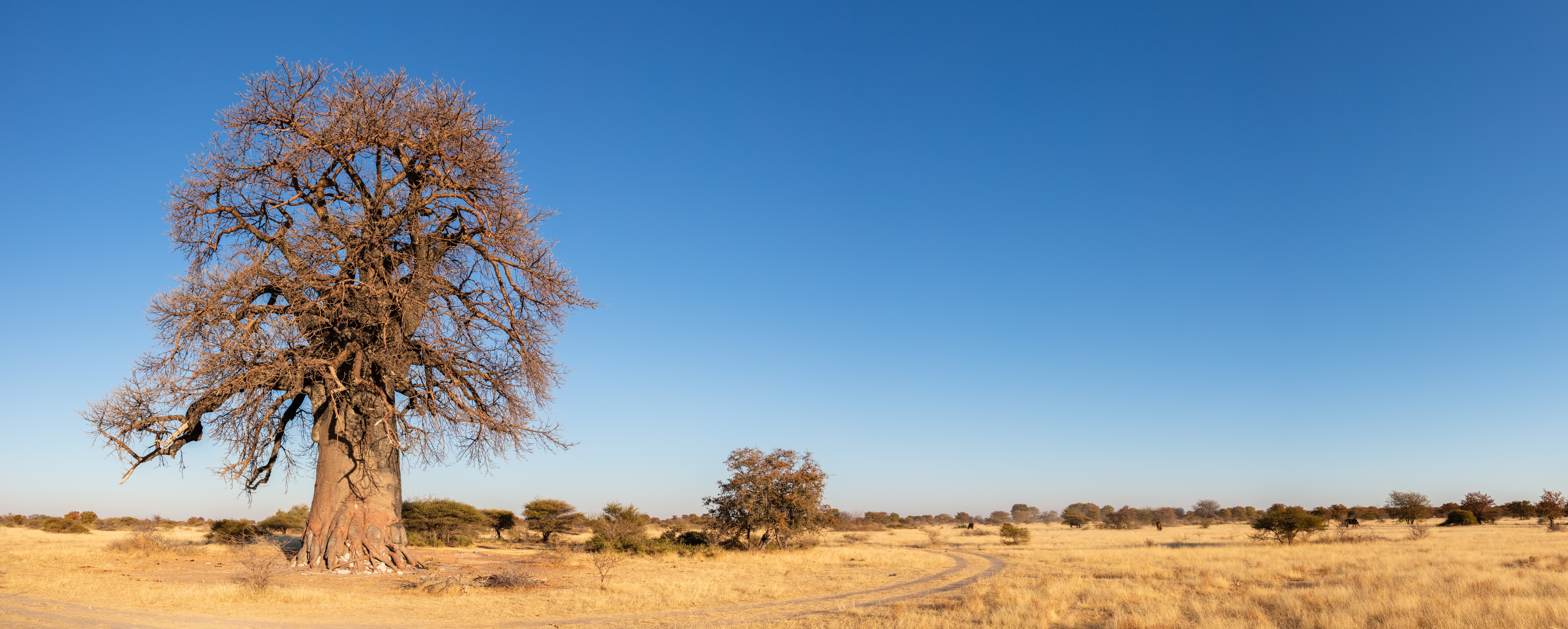
Makgadikgadi Pans

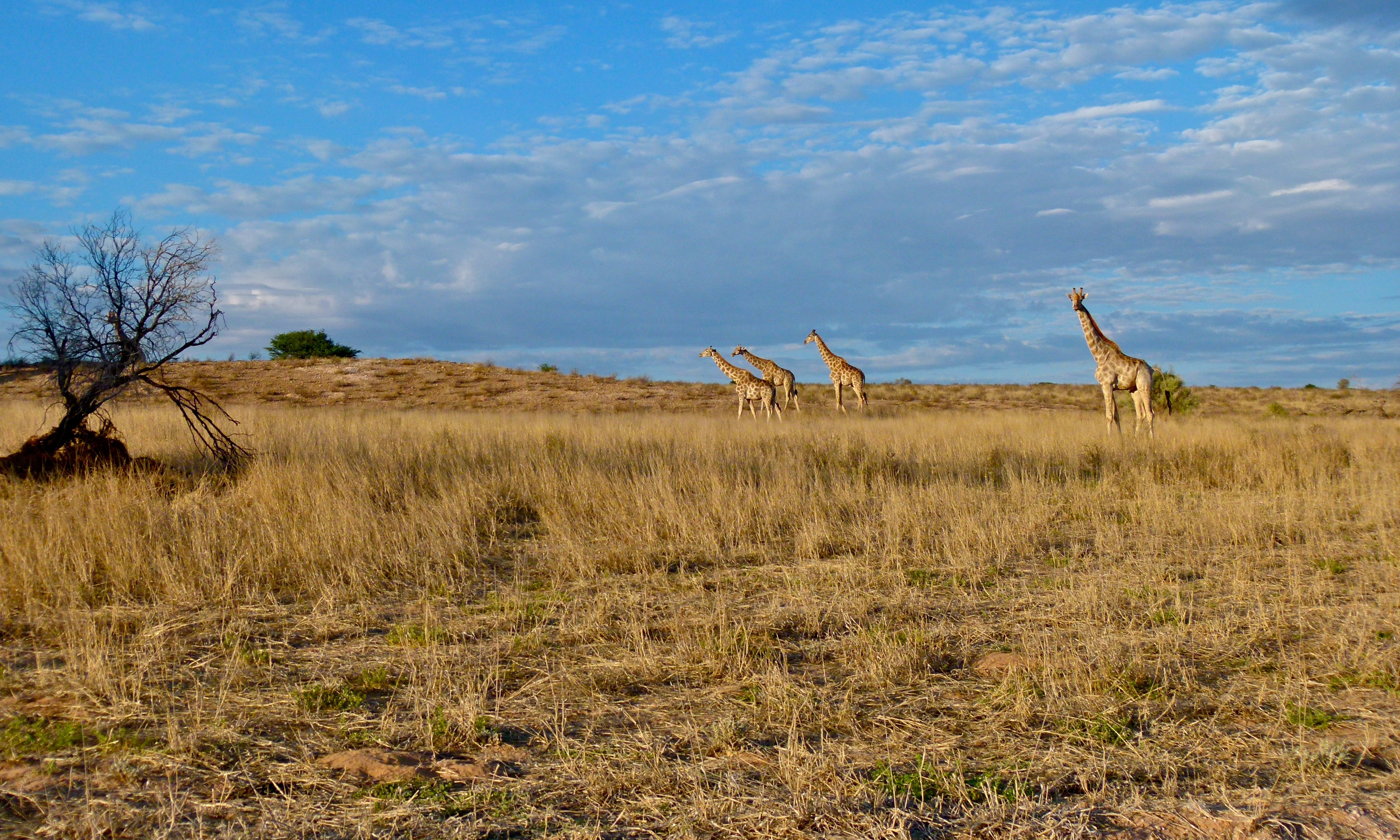
Western Kgalagadi

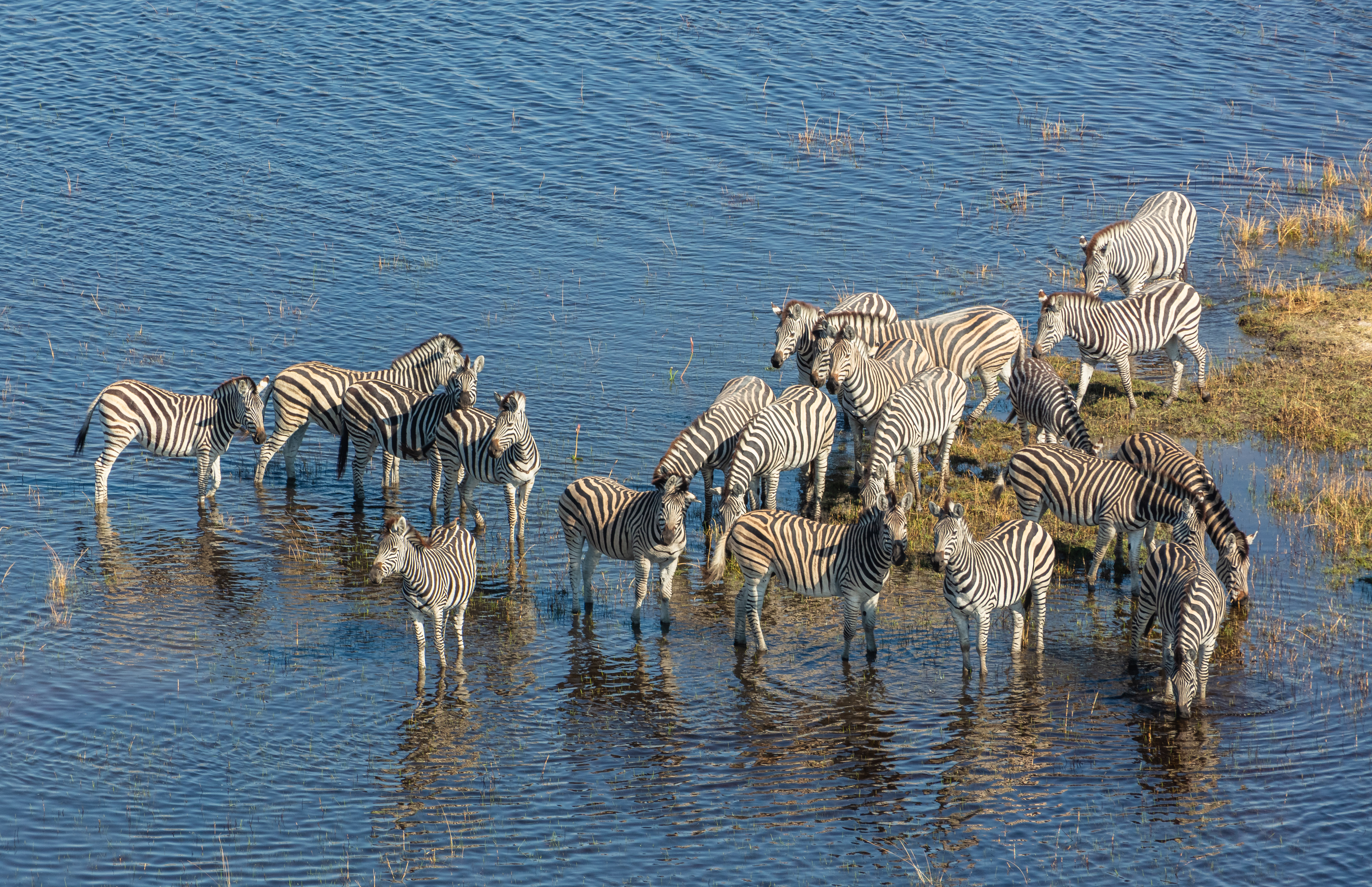
Okavango Delta

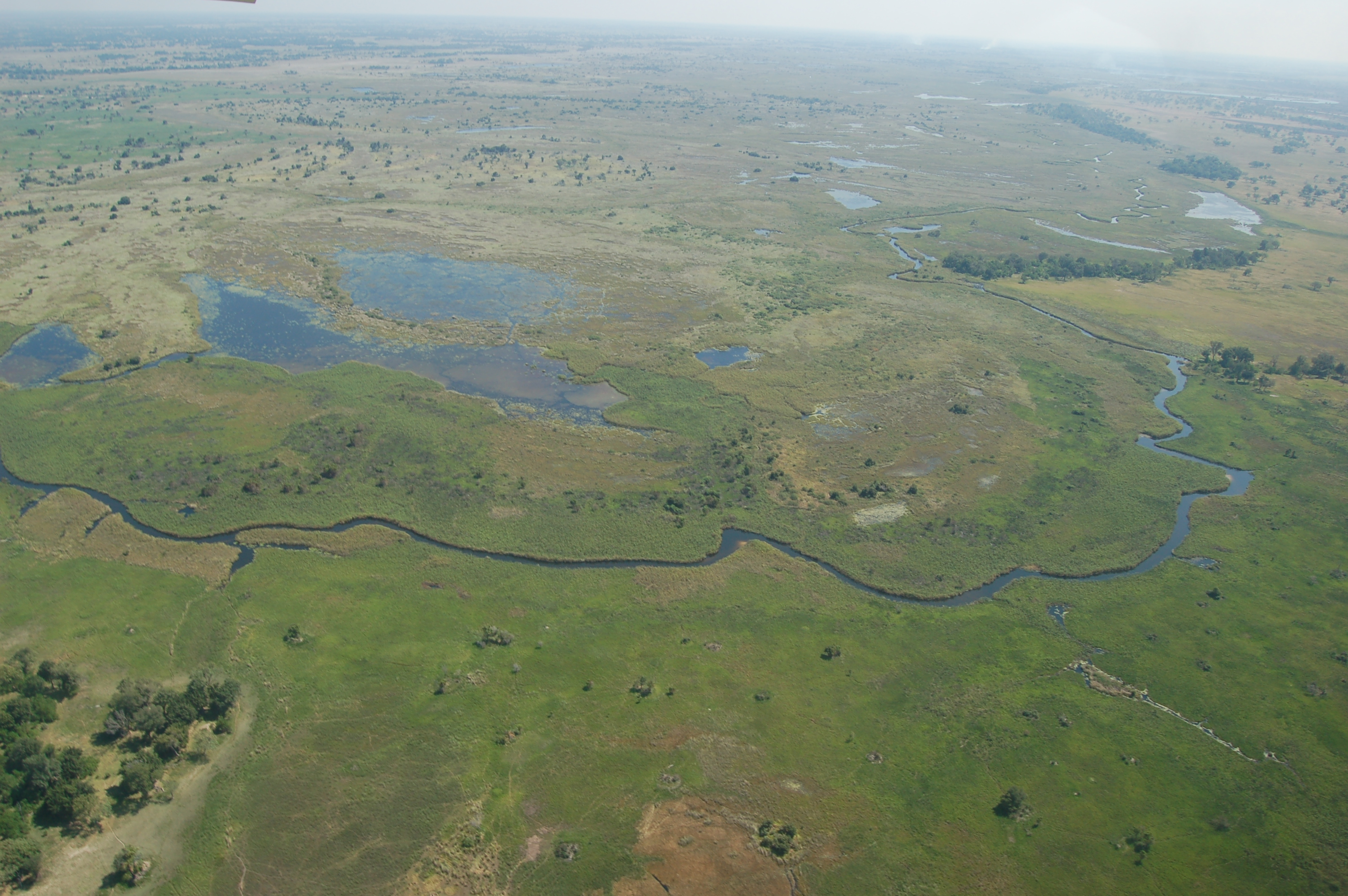
Okavango Delta

== Partnerships ==
CI Botswana’s programmes have involved collaboration with Botswana government agencies and other stakeholders. In the Okavango Delta region, programme governance has included a national advisory council chaired by a cabinet-level minister with participation from government and civil-society representatives, and environmental education work has included curriculum materials developed with Botswana’s Ministry of Education and Skills Development.

At the national level, communal-rangelands restoration work has involved the Green Climate Fund and Botswana’s Ministry of Agriculture, including a public project launch in Tsabong in May 2025. CI Botswana also participated in coordination and information-sharing forums linked to the Northern Botswana Human Wildlife Coexistence Project and worked with the Department of Wildlife and National Parks on the Western Kgalagadi Conservation Corridor project. During regional debate about Namibia's proposed pipeline from the Okavango River, it supported calls for the Okavango River Basin Water Commission (OKACOM) to require full environmental and social impact studies before the project proceeded.

== Funding and conservation finance ==
Between 2000 and 2003, the CI-Okavango programme received Development Grant Facility grants totalling US$700,000 for work in the Okavango Delta region, alongside other donor funding.

In the 2020s, Conservation International Foundation became the accredited entity for the Green Climate Fund project Ecosystem-based adaptation and mitigation in Botswana's communal rangelands. The project was approved on 19 March 2021 and began implementation on 1 December 2021, with an estimated completion date of 1 June 2030; financing includes a US$36.76 million grant and US$60.87 million in co-financing. The project includes an environmental and social safeguards report and a gender action plan. In 2022, Conservation International, the Green Climate Fund and Botswana's Ministry of Agriculture launched a US$98 million communal-rangelands restoration initiative.

== Impact and evaluation ==
Programme monitoring and evaluation information for CI Botswana's work has been published through donor reporting systems.

For the Northern Botswana Human Wildlife Coexistence Project, a 2015 implementation status report reported 1,146 direct project beneficiaries and included results-framework reporting on indicators such as 82 DWNP extension staff trained and executing proactive prevention interventions, 297 households using proactive prevention interventions (including beehives, herding dogs and kraaling), and 67 community members employed in local nature-based tourism ventures; it also noted plans to evaluate pilot interventions during the final year of implementation to draw lessons for scaling up.

For the communal rangelands project supported through the Green Climate Fund, annual performance reports for 2022–2024 compile implementation progress, performance against investment criteria and project indicators, financial information, and updates on environmental and social safeguards, Indigenous peoples and gender elements, alongside challenges and mitigation actions; the reports are submitted by the accredited entity and reviewed by the fund secretariat.
