= Nossob River =

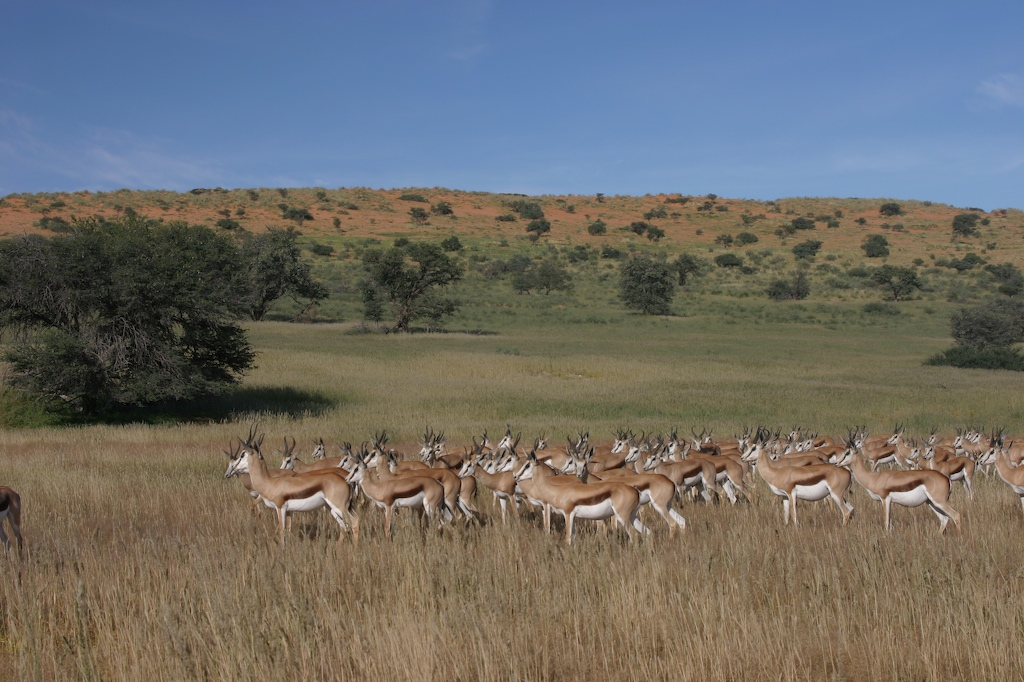
- The Auob River's course, a Nossob tributary

- Location of the Nossob River's mouth

Location
- Country: Botswana, Namibia and South Africa

Physical characteristics
- Source
  - location: Otjihavera Range, Namibia
  - elevation: 1,900 m (6,200 ft)
- 2nd source: Confluence of the Swart-Nossob and Wit-Nossob
  - elevation: 1,565 m (5,135 ft)
- Mouth: Molopo River
  - location: Northern Cape, South Africa
  - coordinates: 26°54′15″S 20°41′24″E
  - elevation: 890 m (2,920 ft)

Basin features
- Tributaries
  - left: Black Nossob River, Klein Nossob River
  - right: White Nossob River, Auob River

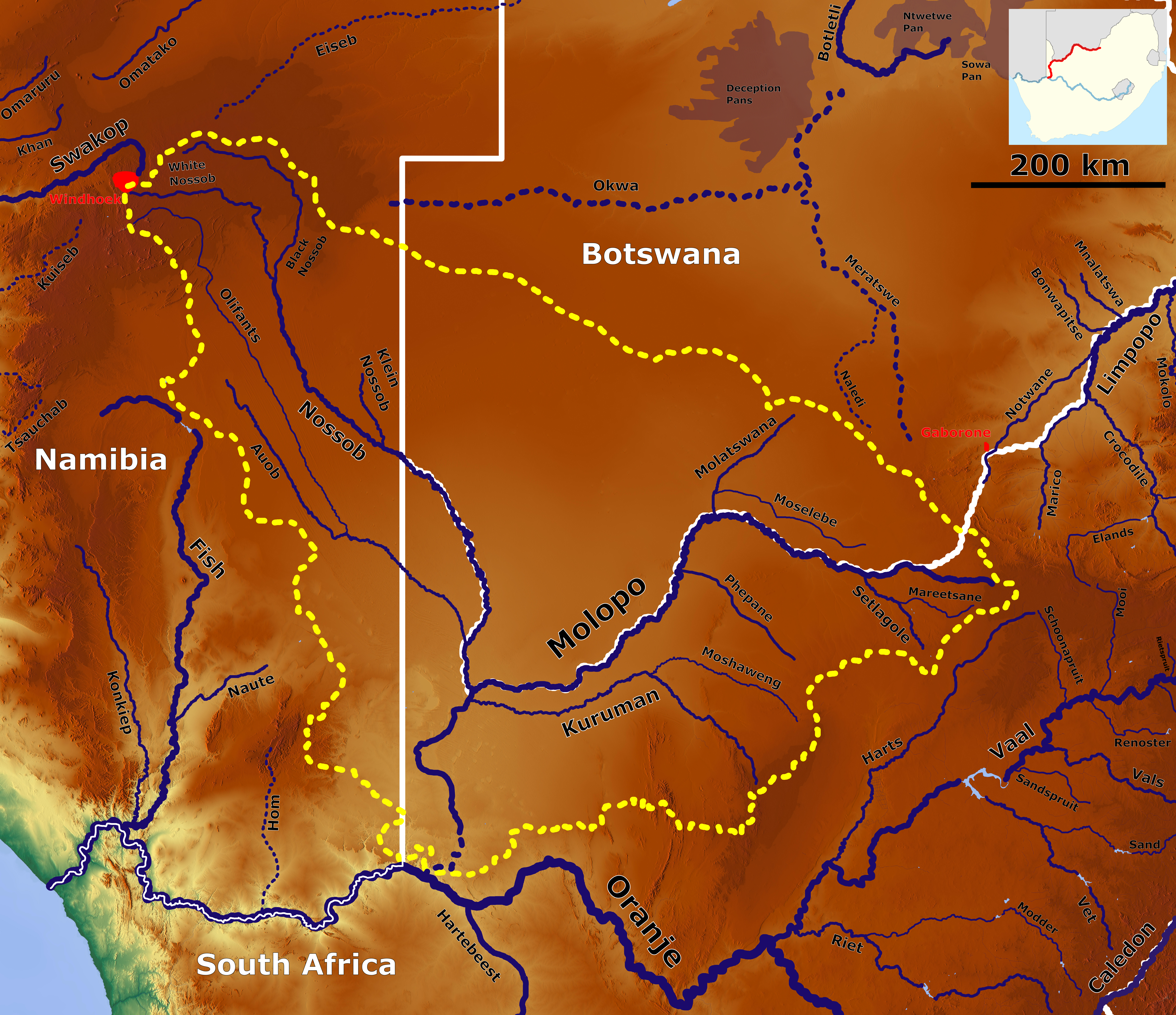
Location of the lower Nossob river (centre) and its tributaries

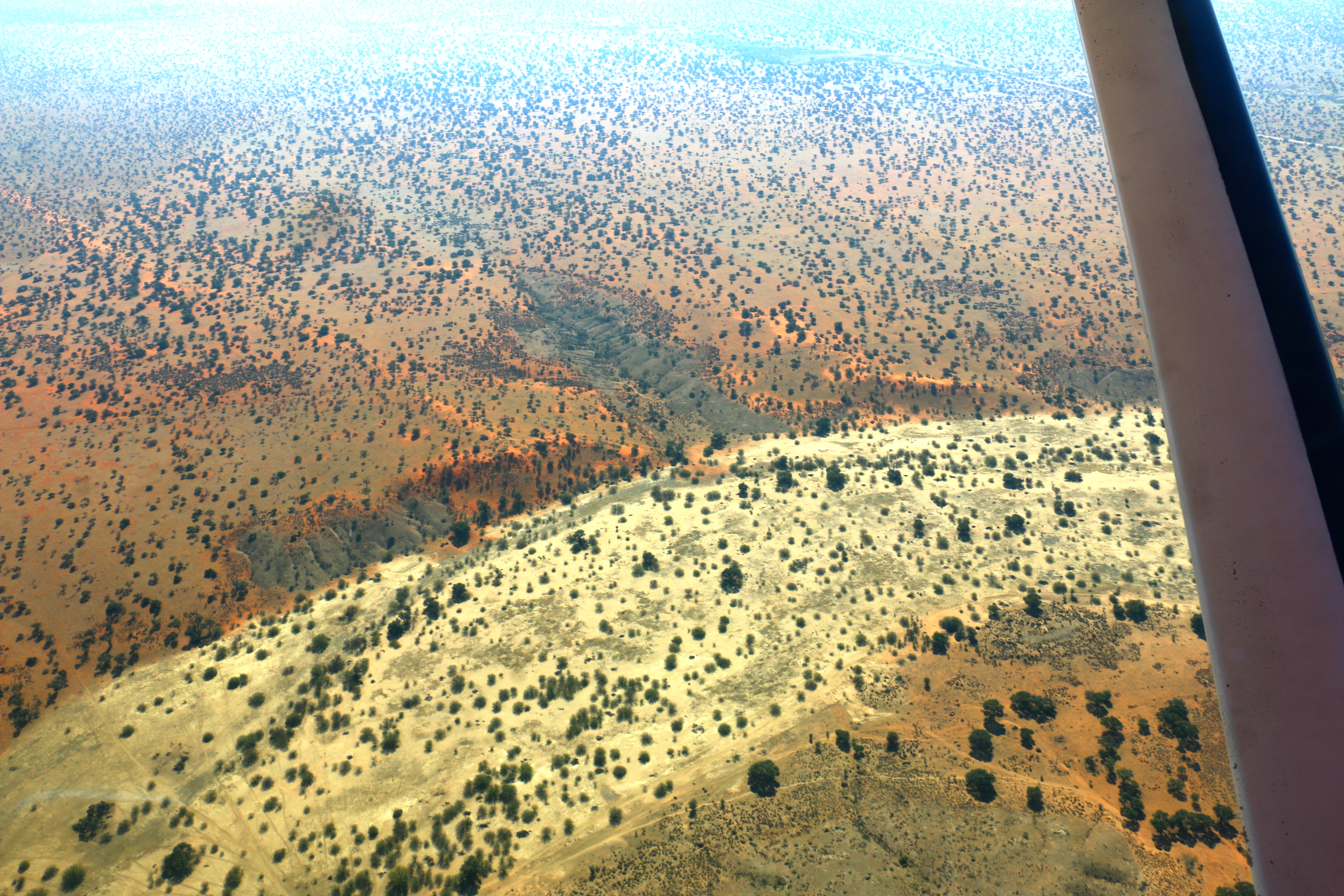
Nossob River east of Aranos crossing the Kalahari

The Nossob River (also Nosob or Nossop; ǂnuse ǃab, Khoikhoi for black river) is a dry river bed in eastern Namibia and the Kalahari region of South Africa and Botswana. It covers a distance of 740 km and last flooded in 1989. The river also lends its name to Nossob camp (25°25′18″S 20°35′47″E) in the Kgalagadi Transfrontier Park.

== Course ==
The Nossob has its origin in two main tributaries, the Swart-Nossob and Wit-Nossob, meaning black and white respectively. Both tributaries have their origins in the eastern slopes of the Otjihavera mountain range, east of Windhoek. Their sources are at 1,800 m and over 2,000 m above sea level respectively. The two river beds have their confluence some 80 km south of Gobabis, which is situated on the bank of the Swart-Nossob.

From this confluence the river course passes the settlements of Leonardville and Aranos to arrive at Union's End, South Africa. From Union's End the river bed, forming the Botswana border, meanders through the Kgalagadi Transfrontier Park for a distance of over 200 km. It reaches the southern boundary of the game reserve just north of Twee Rivieren Camp, near its confluence with the Auob River.

In the Kalahari, the Nossob is said to flow about once a century. However, water is stored underground to provide life for grass and camelthorn trees growing in the river bed. The Nossob may flow briefly after large thunderstorms, causing wildlife to flock to the river.

The Nossob ends at a confluence with the Molopo River some 50 km south of Twee Rivieren. The confluence at 26°54′15″S 20°41′24″E is still 890 m above sea level. The Molopo is a tributary of the Orange River, which it meets downstream of Augrabies Falls.

== Dams ==
=== White Nossob ===
- Otjivero Dam, near the settlements of Otjivero and Omitara

=== Oanob River ===
The Oanob River, a tributary of the Auob River features two dams:

- Nauspoort Dam
- Oanob Dam

== See also ==
- Kgalagadi Transfrontier Park
