= Kgalagadi Transfrontier Park =

Transfrontier conservation area in Botswana and South Africa

- Kalahari Gemsbok National Park; Gemsbok National Park
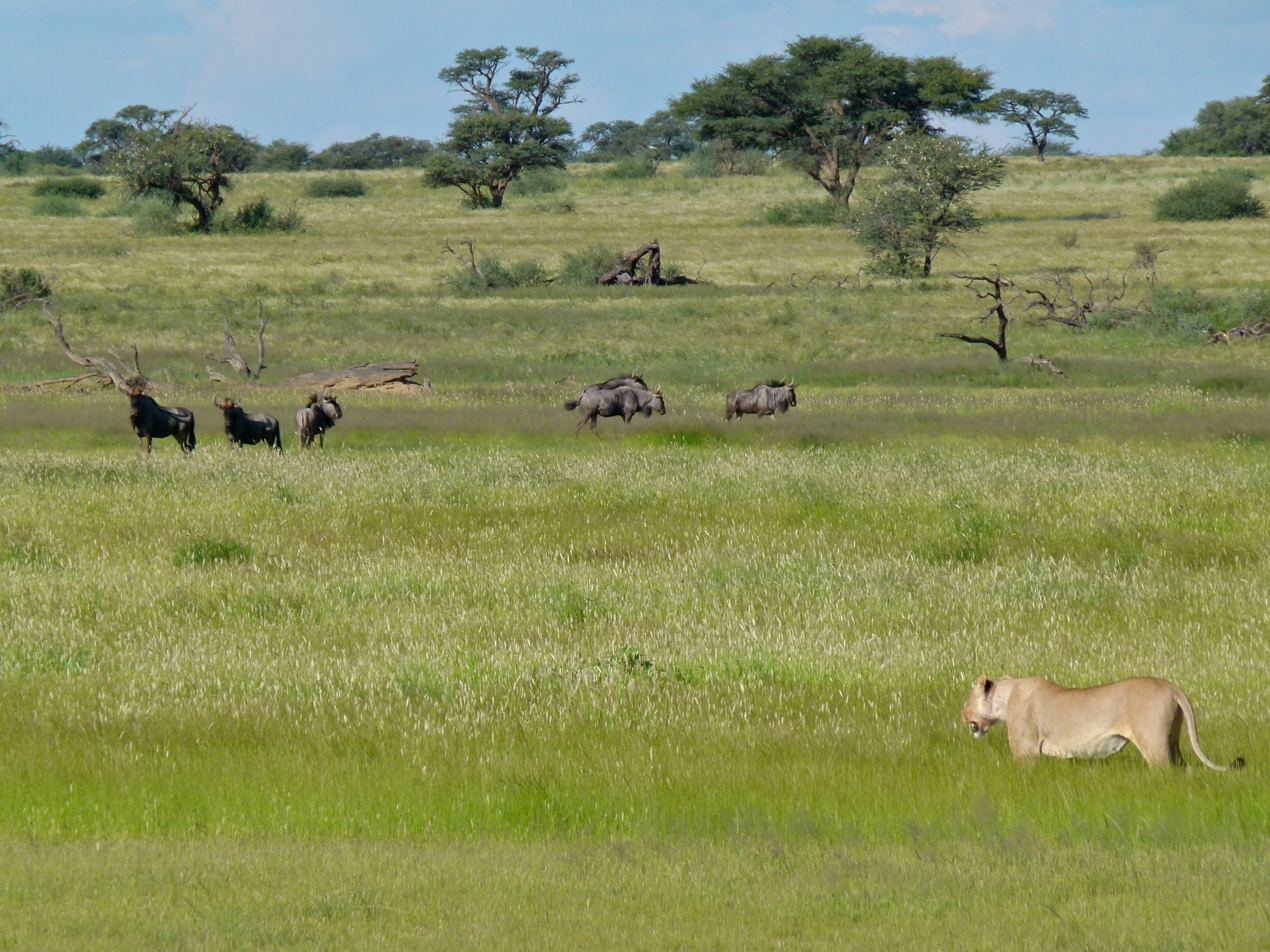

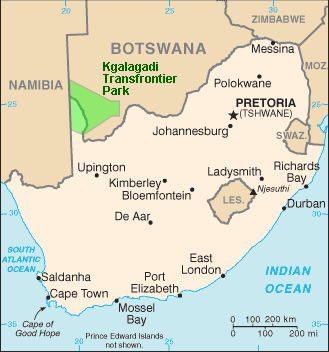
- Location: Kgalagadi District, Botswana / Northern Cape, South Africa
- Nearest city: Upington
- Coordinates: 25°46′S 20°23′E
- Area: 38,000 km^{2} (15,000 sq mi)
- Established: 31 July 1931 (Kalahari Gemsbok National Park); 12 May 2000 (Kgalagadi Transfrontier Park)
- Governing body: Department of Wildlife and National Parks (Botswana) / South African National Parks
- Website: www.sanparks.org/parks/kgalagadi/

Kgalagadi Transfrontier Park is a large wildlife reserve and conservation area in southern Africa.

The park straddles the border between South Africa and Botswana and comprises two adjoining national parks:

- Kalahari Gemsbok National Park in South Africa
- Gemsbok National Park in Botswana

The park's total area is 38,000 square kilometres (15,000 sq mi). Approximately three-quarters of the park lies in Botswana and one-quarter in South Africa. Kgalagadi means "place of thirst." In December 2015, media reports claimed that rights for gas-fracking in more than half of the Botswana portion of the park had been sold. The Botswana government later refuted these reports.

== Location and terrain ==
The park is located largely within the southern Kalahari Desert. The terrain consists of red dunes, sparse vegetation, occasional trees, and the dry riverbeds of the Nossob and Auob Rivers. The rivers are said to flow only about once per century. However, water flows underground, providing life for grass and Vachellia erioloba trees growing in river beds. The rivers may flow briefly after large thunderstorms.

== Wildlife ==
With over 470 documented species, the park has abundant wildlife, including lion, cheetah, African leopard, spotted hyena and brown hyena. Smaller mammals include African wildcat, bat-eared fox and Cape fox, black-backed jackal, caracal, genets and honey badger, as well as meerkats and mongooses. Migratory herds of large ungulates, such as blue wildebeest, gemsbok, springbok, steenbok, southern giraffe, common eland, greater kudu, warthog, klipspringer and red hartebeest also live and move seasonally in the park, providing sustenance for the predators. More than 200 bird species inhabit the park, including ostriches, bustards, waterfowl, storks and passerines and around 30 raptors. There are over 30 reptile and amphibian species of in the park, including venomous snakes such as the Cape cobra, horned adder, puff adder and black mamba; Cape terrapins, leopard tortoise and serrated tortoise, various agama, gecko, and skink species; amphibians include sand frog and African bullfrog.

Since 2005, the protected area has been considered a Lion Conservation Unit and a lion stronghold in Southern Africa.

== Conservation ==
Conservation planning around the park has included work on the Western Kgalagadi Conservation Corridor project, intended to maintain and restore wildlife access to resources and support community development and tourism in a corridor linking Kgalagadi Transfrontier Park and the Central Kalahari Game Reserve. Conservation International Botswana participated in related coordination and worked with Botswana’s Department of Wildlife and National Parks on the corridor project.

== Weather ==
The weather in the Kalahari can reach extremes. January is midsummer in southern Africa, and the daytime temperatures often exceed 40 °C (104 °F). Winter nights can be quite cold, with temperatures below freezing. Extreme temperatures of −11 °C (12 °F) and up to 45 °C (113 °F) have been recorded. Precipitation is sparse in this desert area.

Climate data for Kgalagadi Transfrontier Park (Twee Rivieren)
Month	Jan	Feb	Mar	Apr	May	Jun	Jul	Aug	Sep	Oct	Nov	Dec	Year
Record high °C (°F)	42.0 (107.6)	41.2 (106.2)	40.5 (104.9)	37.2 (99.0)	33.5 (92.3)	29.3 (84.7)	30.2 (86.4)	33.6 (92.5)	38.5 (101.3)	40.5 (104.9)	41.7 (107.1)	45.4 (113.7)	45.4 (113.7)
Mean daily maximum °C (°F)	35.8 (96.4)	34.5 (94.1)	32.5 (90.5)	28.7 (83.7)	24.6 (76.3)	21.6 (70.9)	22.0 (71.6)	23.9 (75.0)	28.6 (83.5)	31.0 (87.8)	33.6 (92.5)	35.6 (96.1)	29.4 (84.9)
Daily mean °C (°F)	27.7 (81.9)	26.7 (80.1)	24.6 (76.3)	20.2 (68.4)	15.1 (59.2)	11.8 (53.2)	11.4 (52.5)	13.3 (55.9)	18.0 (64.4)	21.4 (70.5)	24.4 (75.9)	26.7 (80.1)	20.1 (68.2)
Mean daily minimum °C (°F)	19.6 (67.3)	19.1 (66.4)	16.8 (62.2)	11.7 (53.1)	5.5 (41.9)	2.1 (35.8)	0.9 (33.6)	2.7 (36.9)	7.5 (45.5)	11.8 (53.2)	15.3 (59.5)	17.8 (64.0)	10.9 (51.6)
Record low °C (°F)	7.6 (45.7)	5.7 (42.3)	3.9 (39.0)	−2.0 (28.4)	−7.3 (18.9)	−9.7 (14.5)	−10.3 (13.5)	−9.7 (14.5)	−5.0 (23.0)	−0.2 (31.6)	3.2 (37.8)	3.0 (37.4)	−10.3 (13.5)
Average precipitation mm (inches)	43 (1.7)	45 (1.8)	33 (1.3)	31 (1.2)	12 (0.5)	3 (0.1)	1 (0.0)	2 (0.1)	2 (0.1)	12 (0.5)	18 (0.7)	20 (0.8)	222 (8.7)
Average precipitation days (≥ 0.1 mm)	5	5	5	4	3	2	1	1	1	2	3	4	38
Average relative humidity (%)	38	47	55	59	61	62	57	51	39	36	35	34	48
Source: Deutscher Wetterdienst

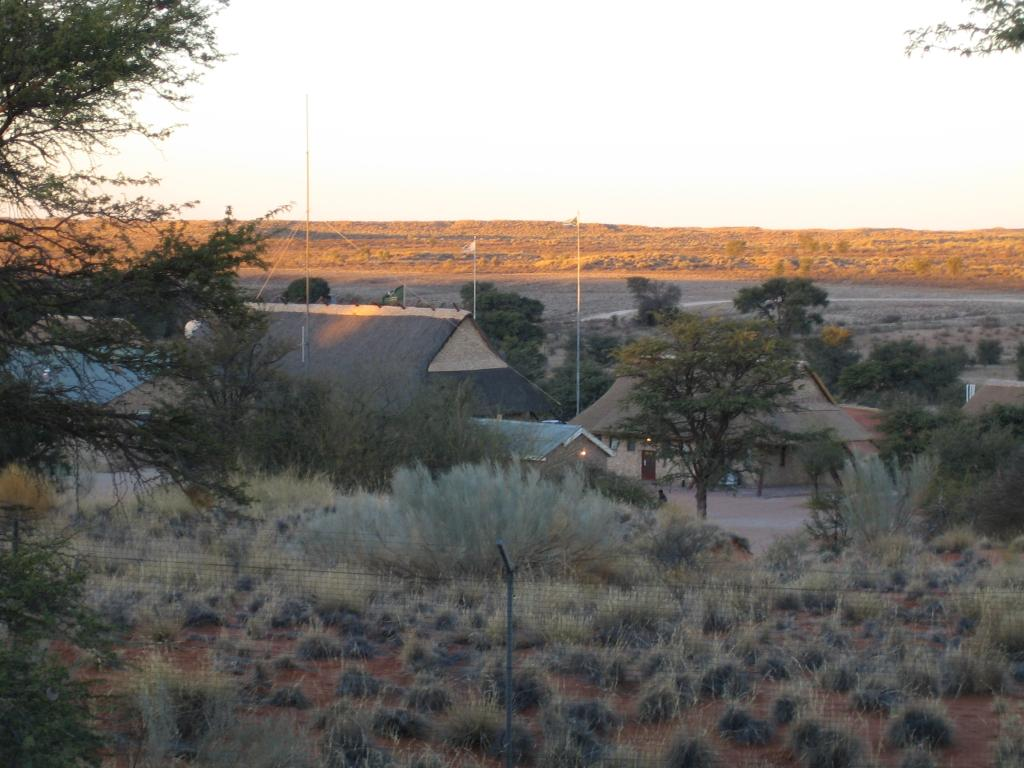
Twee Rivieren Camp

== Facilities ==
The park has three traditional tourist lodges called "rest camps". These are fully serviced lodges and include amenities such as air conditioning, shops, and swimming pools. There are also six wilderness camps in the park. The wilderness camps provide little more than shelter and wash water; visitors must supply their food, drinking water, and firewood.

== Visitors ==
From 1 April 2017 to 31 March 2018, the park received 52,463 visitors, up from 48,221 in the previous year.

== History ==
The Kalahari Gemsbok National Park in South Africa was established on 31 July 1931 mainly to protect the migrating game, especially the gemsbok, from poaching. In 1948 an informal verbal agreement was made between the then Bechuanaland Protectorate and the Union of South Africa to set up a conservation area in the contiguous areas of the two lands. In June 1992, representatives from the South African National Parks Board (now SANParks) and the Department of Wildlife and National Parks of Botswana set up a joint management committee to manage the area as a single ecological unit. A management plan was drafted, reviewed, and approved in 1997. The parties agreed to cooperate in tourism and share equally in park entrance fees. On 7 April 1999, Botswana and South Africa signed a historic bilateral agreement whereby both countries undertook to manage their adjacent national parks, the Gemsbok National Park in Botswana and the Kalahari Gemsbok National Park in South Africa as a single ecological unit. The boundary between the two parks had no physical barriers, although it is also the international border between the two countries. This allowed for the free movement of animals. On 12 May 2000, President Festus Mogae of Botswana and President Thabo Mbeki of South Africa formally launched Southern Africa's first peace park, the Kgalagadi Transfrontier Park.

== Cultural preservation and establishment of !Xaus Lodge ==
In October 2002, the governments set aside 580 km^{2} (224 mi^{2}) for the use of the native peoples, the Khomani San and Mier communities. This was divided between 277.69 km^{2} of San Heritage Land and 301.34 km^{2} of Mier Heritage Land. The South African National Parks (SANParks) manages the land under contract. This land was named the !Ae!Hai Heritage Park. The settlement agreement also provided for the communities to receive funds for the specific purpose of constructing a tourism facility. The lodge was named !Xaus Lodge (meaning 'heart' in the local language) and is managed commercially on behalf of the ‡Khomani San and Mier communities by Transfrontier Parks Destinations.

!Xaus Lodge's existence allows the cultural practices of the ‡Khomani San to continue in a few ways. The cultural village near the Lodge allows the local people to create and sell their crafts. This is both a way for them to emulate and remember the culture of historical ‡Khomani San, and a way for them to express the changes in that culture. The !Ae!Hai Heritage Park has also been named the first International Dark Sky Sanctuary in Africa by the International Dark Sky Association.

== Fracking ==
In December 2015, it was reported in the media that the government of Botswana quietly sold the rights to frack for shale gas in Kgalagadi Transfrontier Park. Reports said it granted prospecting licences for 29,291 square kilometres (2,929,100 ha), 34,435 square kilometres (3,443,500 ha) and 23,980 square kilometres (2,398,000 ha) – more than half of the Botswanan part of the park – to a United Kingdom-listed company called "Nodding Donkey". The sale was not reported at the time. In November 2015, the company changed its name to "Karoo Energy". In February 2016, Botswana's Ministry of Environment, Wildlife and Tourism refuted these reports saying, "There are also no licenses for fracking in the KTP" and "no intention to issue any approvals for fracking in the KTP or any other national park or national game reserve anywhere in Botswana".

== Gallery ==
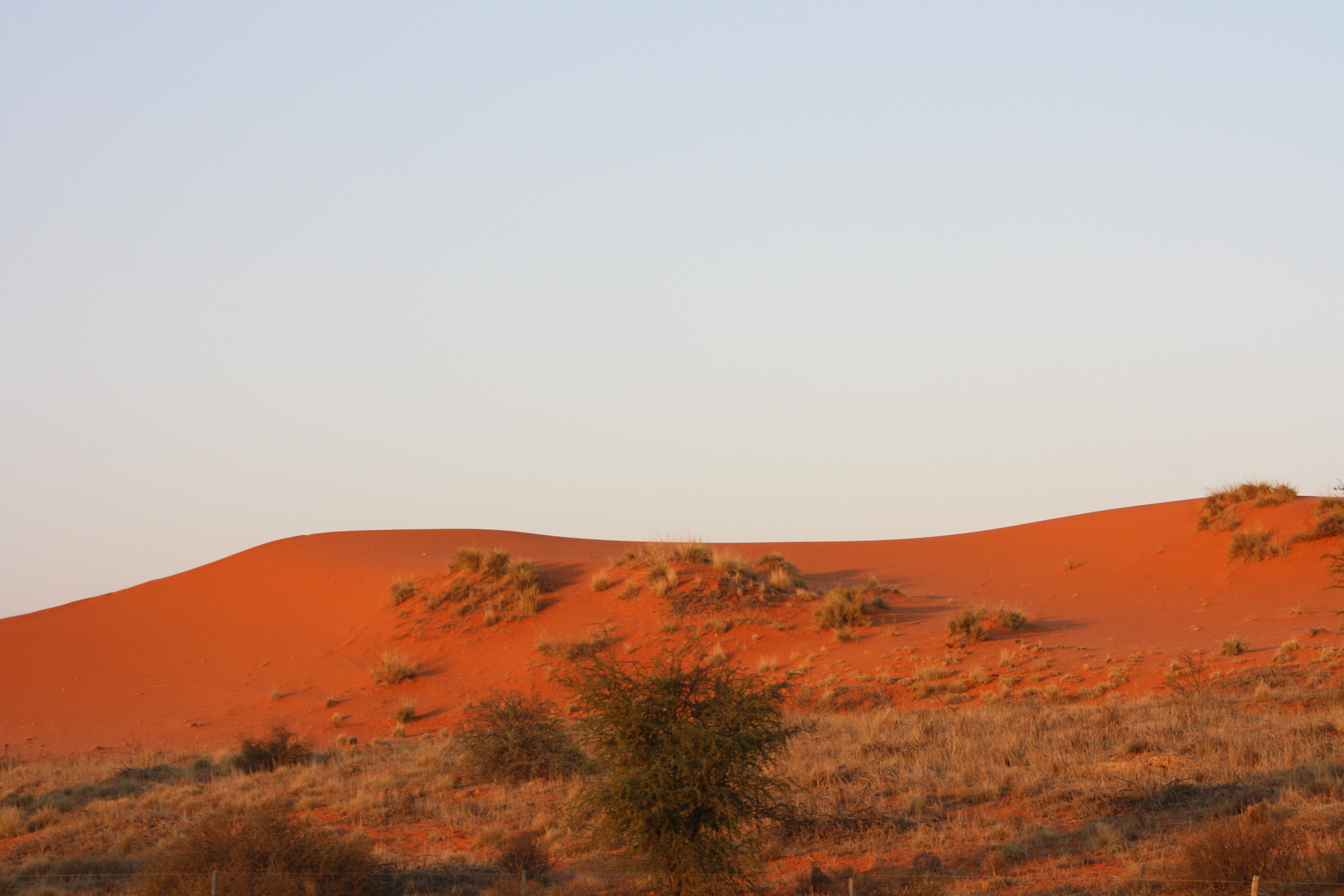
Red dunes in the Kgalagadi-Kalahari

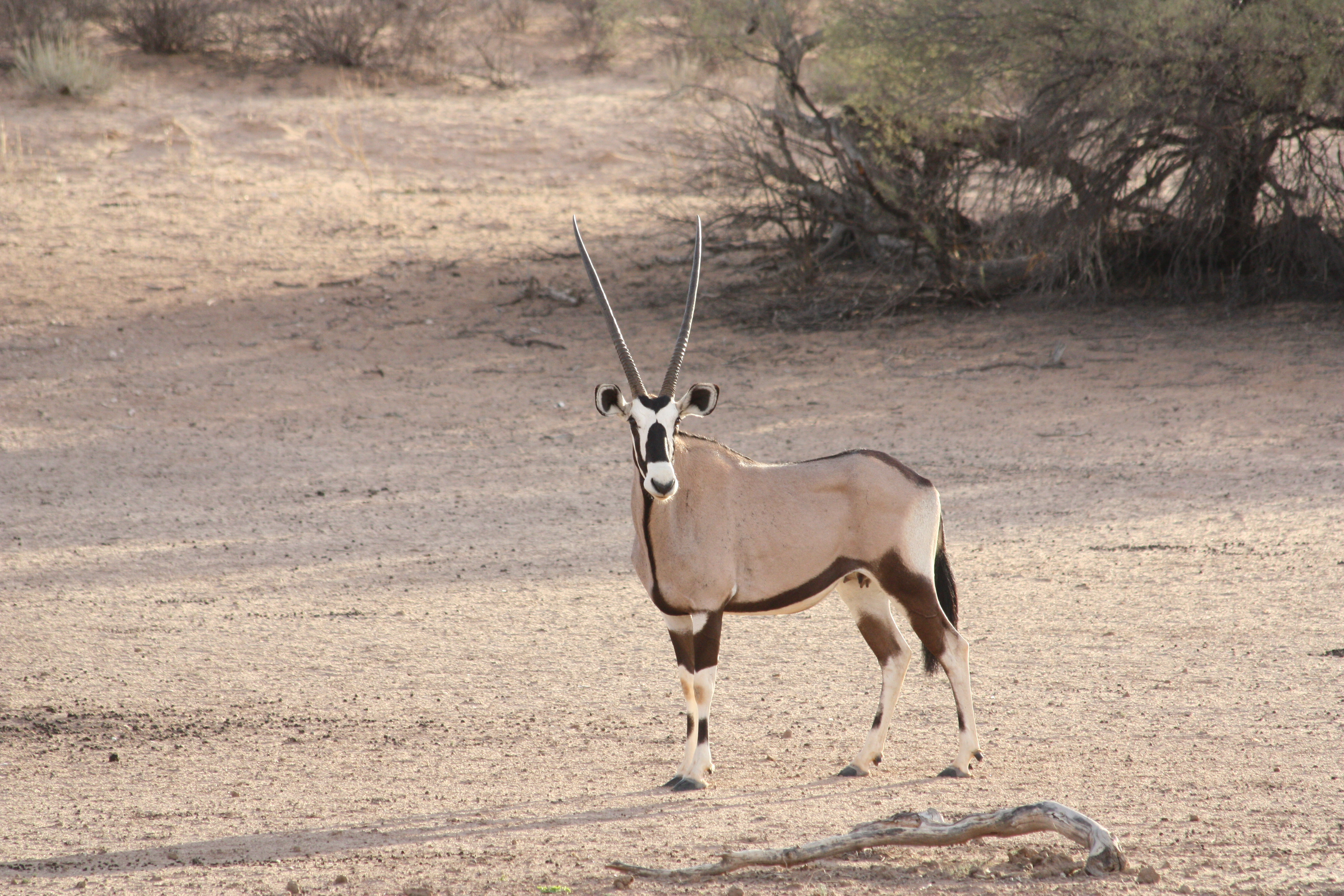
The gemsbok or oryx, for which the original parks were named, standing in a dry riverbed

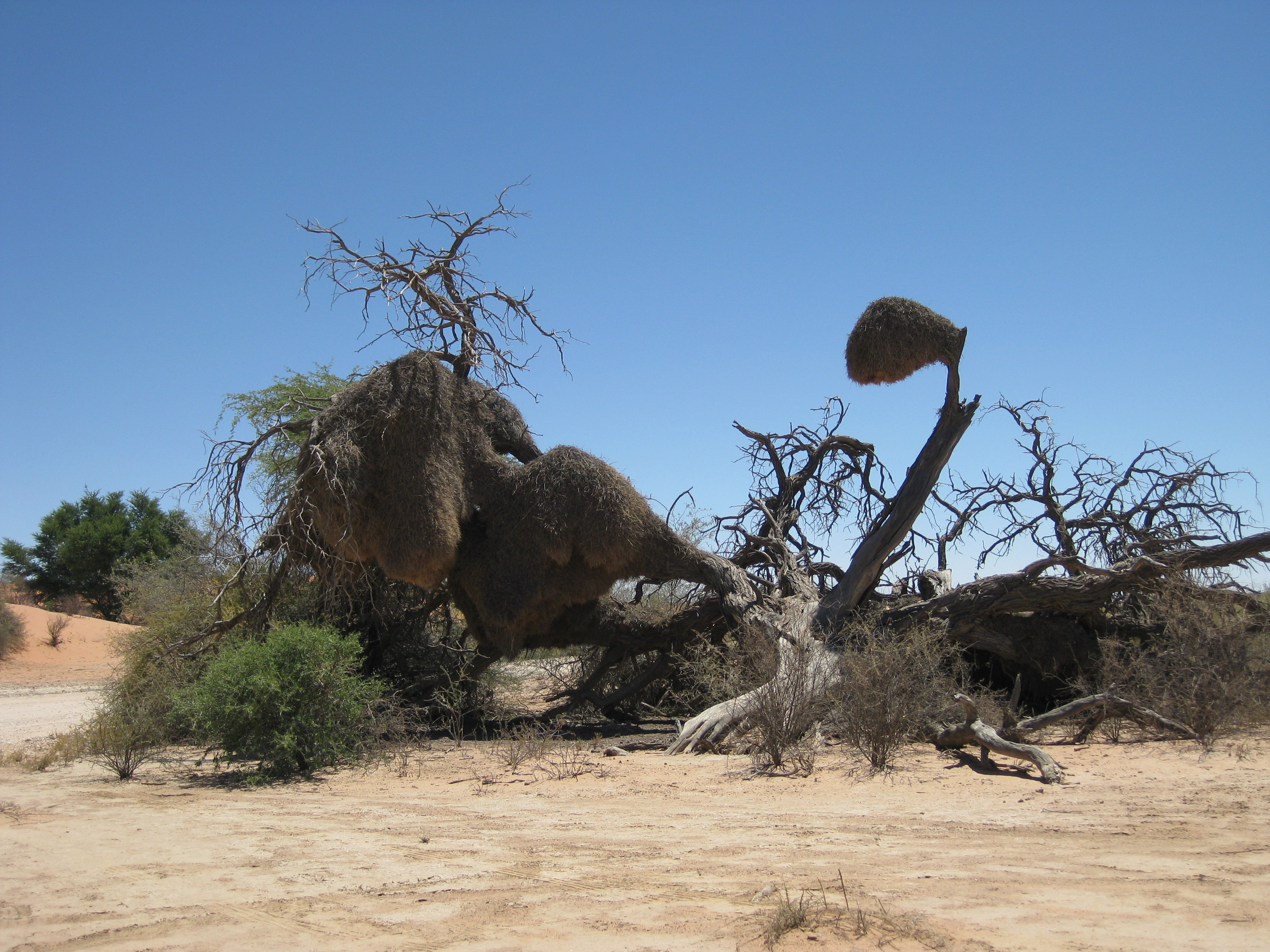
Social bird nests

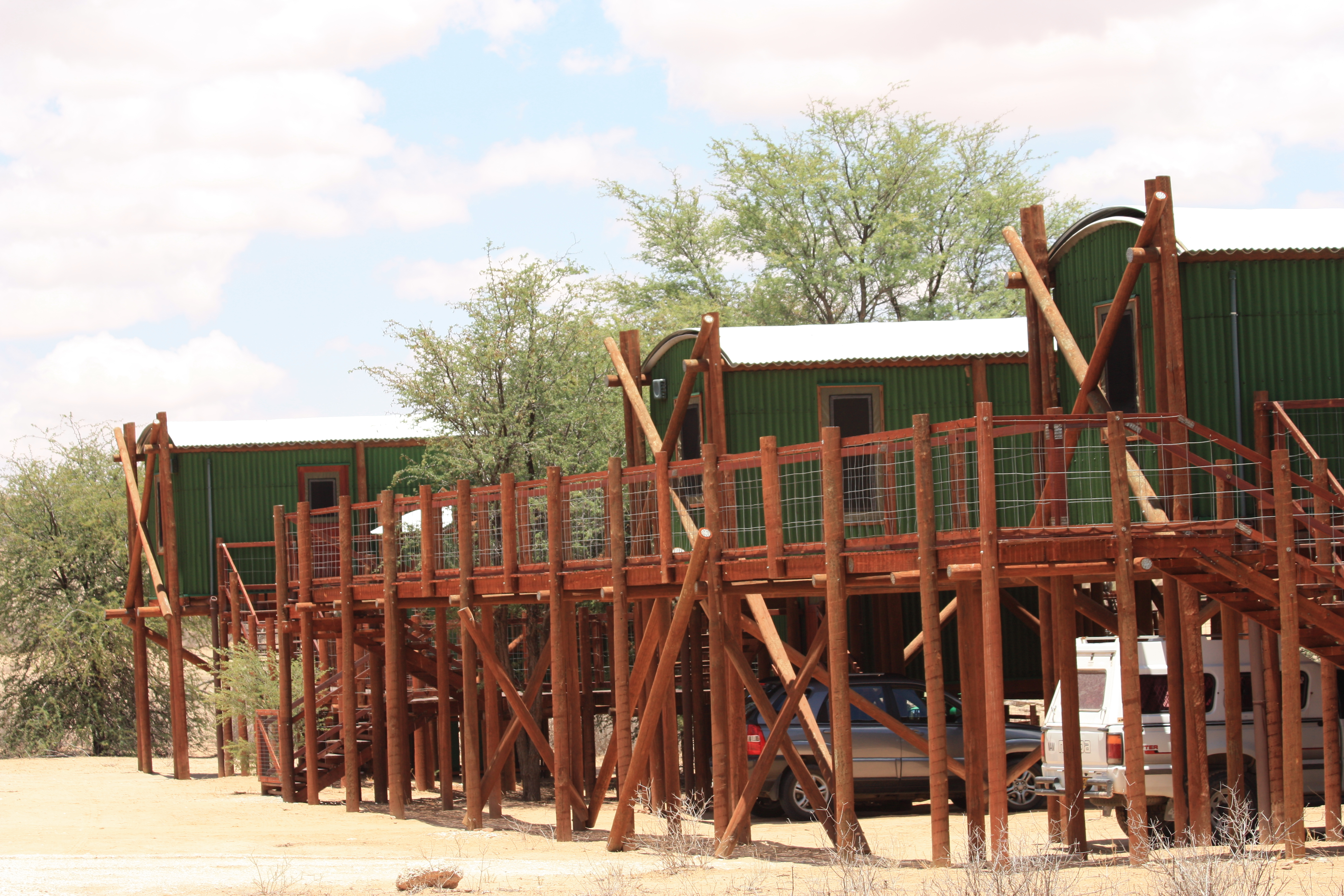
Urikaruus Camp

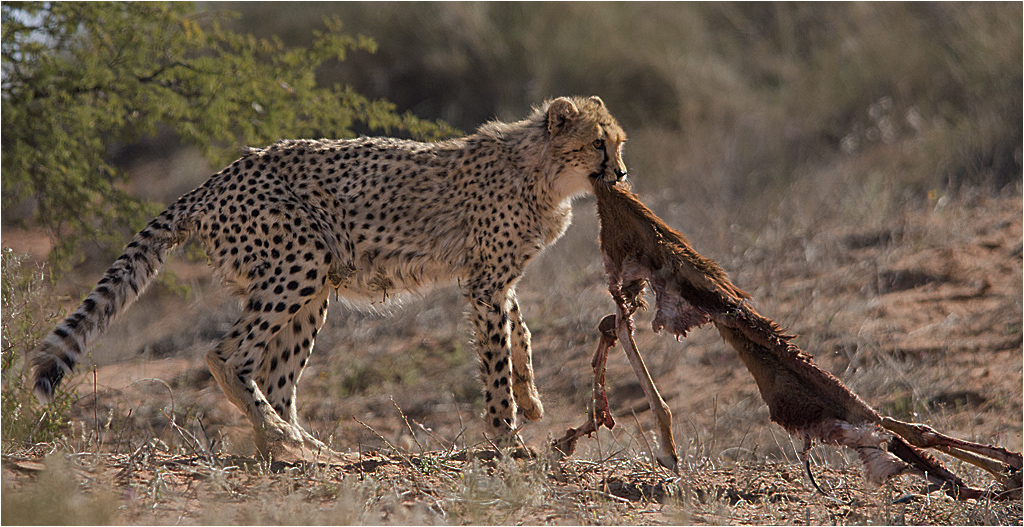
A Southern African cheetah with a carcass

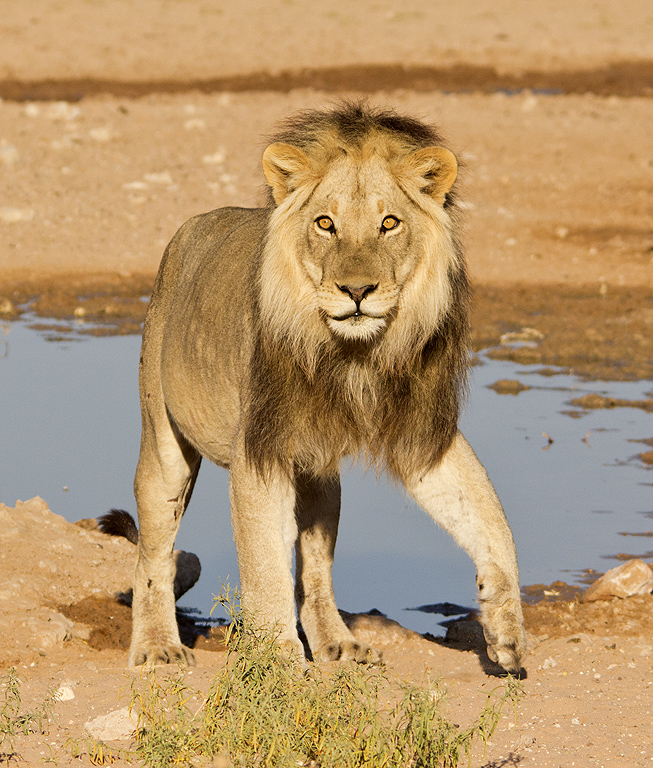
A male lion at a waterhole

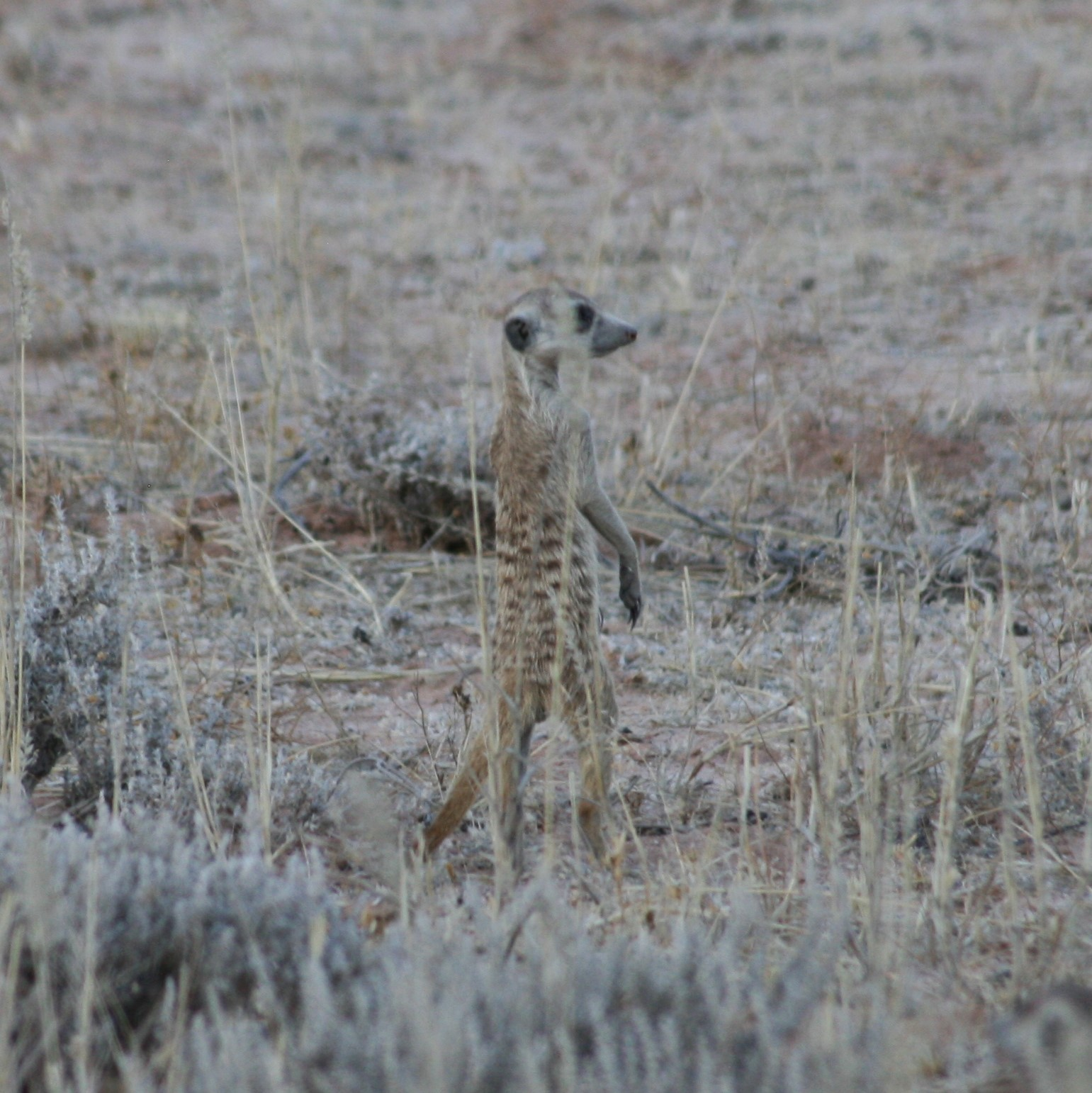
Meerkats are abundant

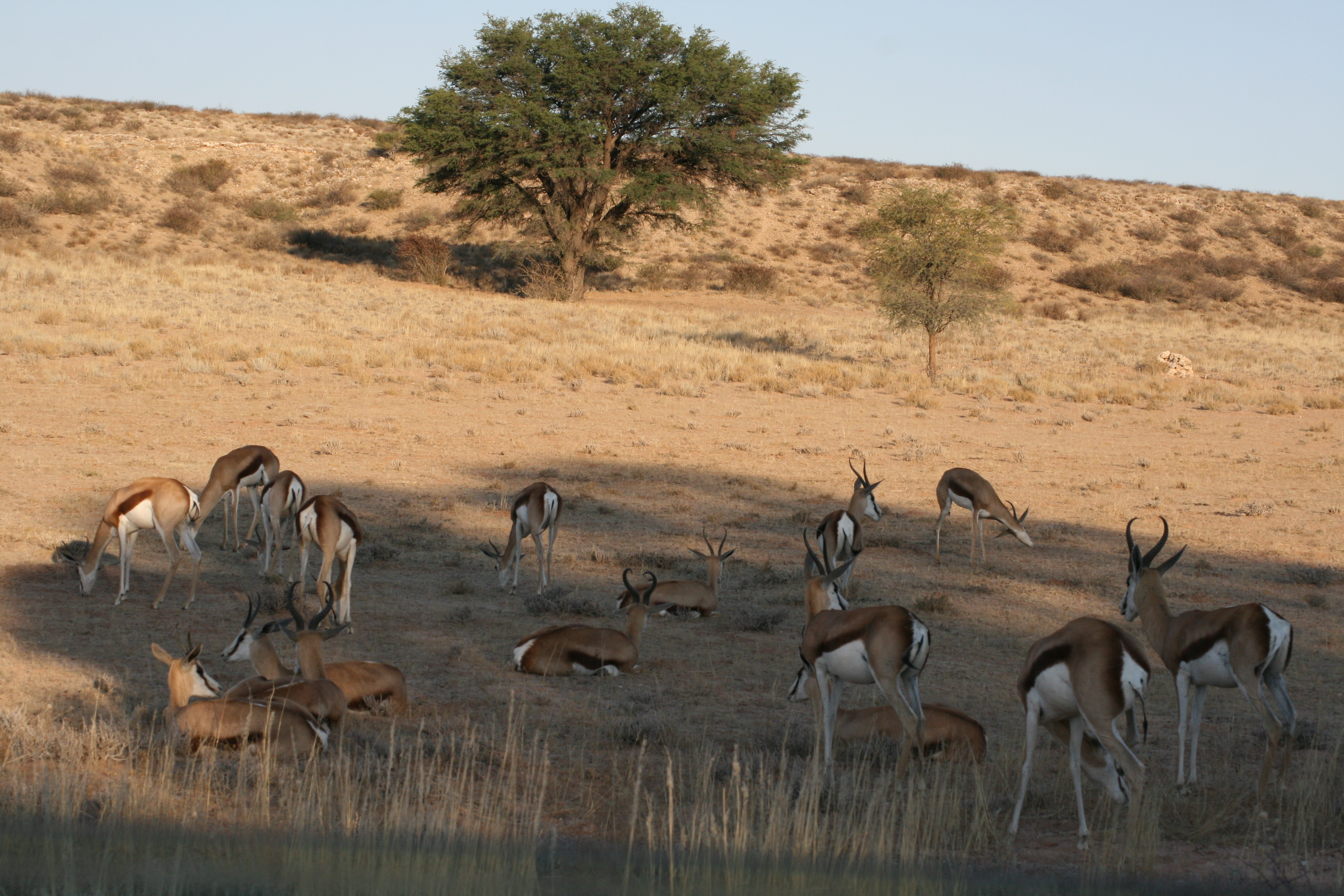
Herd of springboks

== See also ==
- Gemsbok
- Kalahari Desert
