= Unyamwezi =

Former Nyamwezi kingdoms in Central Tanzania c. 1500s-1962

Unyamwezi Kingdoms Utemi ya Unyamwesi (Kinyamwezi)
- c.16th Century–1962
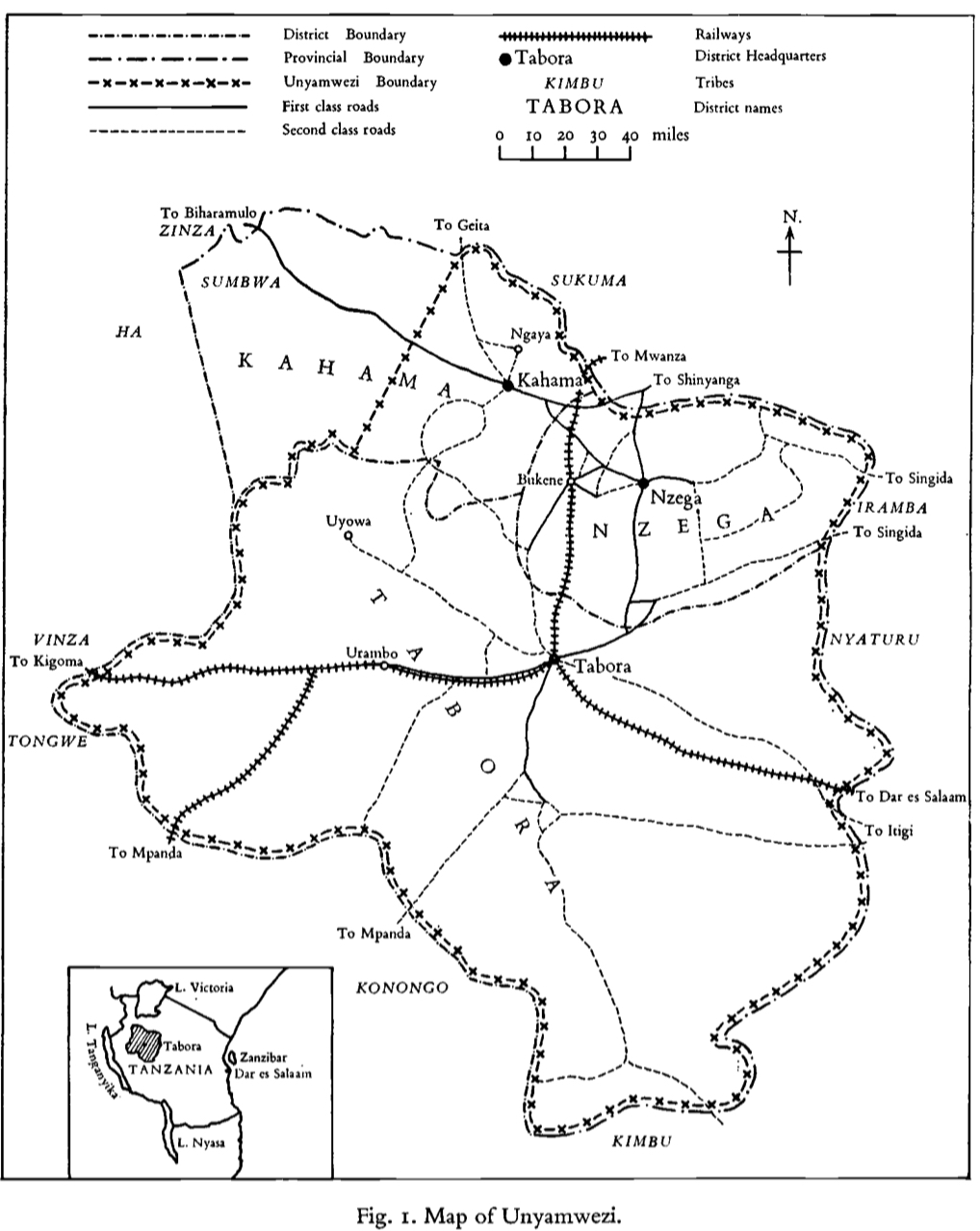
- Map of Unyamwezi c.1950s
- Status: Kingdom
- Common languages: Official language Kinyamwezi Unofficial minority languages Sukuma, Sumbwa, Swahili, Kimbu & Konongo
- Religion: African Traditional; Islam; Christian
- Government: Monarchy
- Mntemi (King)
  - c.1860s-1884: Mirambo
- Historical era: Pre-colonial era; Scramble for Africa; World War I World War II; Post-colonial era
  - Established: c.16th Century
  - Abolution of former nations: 6 December 1962
  - Formal abdication: 6 December 1962

Area
- 1957: 72,000 km^{2} (28,000 sq mi)

Population
  - 1880s: ~200,000
  - 1920s: ~260,000
  - 1957: 363,254
- Currency: Zanzibari rupee; Goldmark (1873–1914); East African shilling (after 1918)
Preceded by	Succeeded by
Nyamwezi Chiefdoms	Tanganyika
- Today part of: Tanzania
- Area and population not including colonial possessions

- Person: Mnyamwezi
- People: Wanyamwezi
- Language: Kinyamwezi
- Country: Unyamwezi

Unyamwezi or Unyamwezi states and kingdoms (Falme za Unyamwezi in Swahili) is a historical region and former Pre-colonial states in what is now modern central Tanzania, around the modern city of Tabora in Tabora Region to the south of Lake Victoria and east of Lake Tanganyika. It lay on the trade route from the coast to Lake Tanganyika and to the kingdoms to the west of Lake Victoria. The region home to the Nyamwezi people became an empire under Mirambo in the 1860s. The various peoples of the region were known as long-distance traders, providing porters for caravans and arranging caravans in their own right. At first the main trade was in ivory, but later in the 19th century enslaving became more important part of the economy.

== Location ==
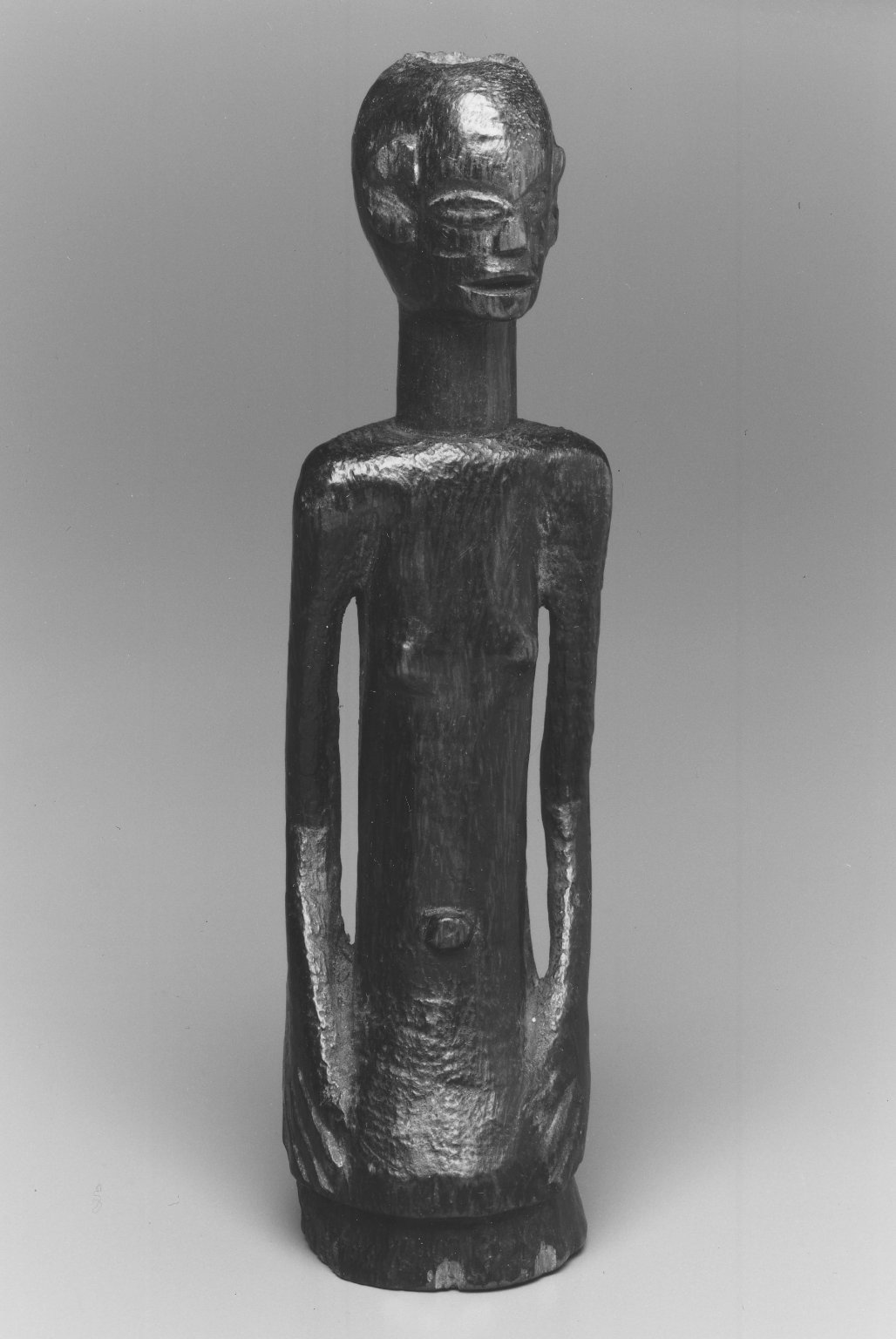
Female torso thought to have originated in the region

The Unyamwezi historic region lies around the modern town of Tabora, between the coast and Lake Tanganyika, and includes the Tabora, Nzega and Kahama districts of the western plateau of modern Tanzania.

== History ==
According to historian Abraham, the Portuguese have recorded the name Unyamwezi since 1589 under the name Monemugi. Antonio Pigafetta, under the name Munemugi or "Land of the Moon", which is the exact equivalent of the name Wu-nya-mweziby which the land is known to its own people. The Encyclopædia Britannica Eleventh Edition said the region "is rich in woods and grass, and has many villages surrounded by well cultivated farms and gardens. The western portions, however, are somewhat swampy and unhealthy." In the 19th century the inhabitants were called Nyamwezi people by outsiders, although this term covered various different groups.

However, most of the area was first inhabited around 300 years ago, in the 18th century. But the majority of the region was first populated in the 18th century, some 300 years ago. Oral traditions state that the Kimba are the ancestors of the first Nyamwezi dynasties, while other dynasties claim to have originated in Kenya, Sagara, Uganda, and Tanganyika.

Several of the ruling Nyamwezi dynasties moved to different parts of Unyamwezi and established their own small kingdoms and chiefdoms. More importantly, there were matrilineal and patrilineal successions in some of the ruling families. The 19th century saw the first arrival of Indian and Arab traders in the area, and by the mid-1840s, Tabora had grown to be a significant trading hub. Coastal traders settled in Unyamwezi, some with hundreds of well-armed Arabs.

=== 19th century ===
The Nyamwezi provided most of the porters for the caravans organized by the coastal Arabs and Swahilis, and also conducted their own caravans. The Nyamwezi were long-distance traders throughout East Africa. Unyamwezi lay at a juncture where a trade route from the coast split, with one branch going west to the port of Ujiji on Lake Tanganyika while another branch led north to the kingdoms of Buganda and Bunyoro.

By 1857, Burton and Speke became the first Europeans to pass through the area. By the mid-19th century, a number of the Unyamwezi exports were enslaved people and ivory, and they imported clothes and weapons. Ivory was not widely used by the Nyamwezi, but at some point they became aware that there was an overseas market for the product, and began to carry ivory along the route from Tabora down to the Indian Ocean coast opposite Zanzibar. There are records of Sultan Sayyid Said of Zanzibar negotiating with envoys from Unyamwezi in 1839 for safe passage for caravans to the interior.

The Nyamwezi did not sell their own people as slaves, since they needed manpower for the ivory trade, but after the 1850s the slave trade began to become important. Slaves brought from the Congo Basin or the Great Lakes region would be held at Tabora, then sent down to the coast in small groups for onward shipment.

The first Europeans to reach the region were Richard Francis Burton and John Hanning Speke, who had been sponsored by the Royal Geographical Society and the British government to investigate the great Lake Uniamési said by German missionaries to lie in the region and determine if it was the source of the Nile. Burton and Speke reached Zanzibar on 20 December 1857, visited Johannes Rebmann (who had reported the lake) at his Kisuludini mission station, and paid a visit to Fuga, capital of the Usambare kingdom. They left for the interior on 26 June 1858. After travelling through mountainous country they reached the inner plateau of Uniamesi. At the Arab trading post of Kazeh (now Tabora) they recorded an elevation of 3,400 feet (1,000 m).

At Kazeh Burton and Speke found a mixed population of Nyamwezi, Tutsi and Arabs engaged in cattle farming and cultivation of foods such as rice, cassava, pawpaw and citrus. Burton called Unyamwezi the garden of inter-tropical Africa.

Henry Morton Stanley visited the region in 1871, where he found that the Zanzibar Arabs were predominant in the country. According to the Encyclopædia Britannica Eleventh Edition, "later the natives rose and, under Mirambo—who had been a common porter and rose to be a conquering chief, earning for himself the title of the Black Bonaparte—a Negro kingdom was formed. Since 1890 the country has been under German control and the power of the native chiefs greatly curtailed."

In the small kingdoms of Unyamwezi, slavery in the 19th century wreaked havoc on neighboring tribes like the Konongo and Kimbu. The tenacious kingdoms survived by collecting toll from Swahili caravans. The settler Arabs, with their slave trade, were able to subjugate many small Naywmwezi kingdoms with the aid of their weapons, most notably the powerful Kingdom of Unyanyembe. In the 1860s, Mirambo gained power and seized the chiefdoms of Busagiri and Ukyankulu. With the backing of numerous other chiefdoms, King Mirambo led a war against the Arabs in 1871, which ended in a truce in 1875.

After his death in 1884, King Mirambo's empire ended up breaking up into small, independent chiefdoms. After the defeat of the Isike of Unyanyembwe, the Germans conquered Unaymwezi by 1893. The Germans made an exception for the Nyamwezi and ruled them indirectly, in contrast to other areas of the country they had conquered. This affected the chiefdoms' power dynamics and caused matrilineal rule to decline.

The British took over after the Germans lost the First World War. The Nyamwezi kept their indirect rule policy but with a more administrative focus on tax collection, and chiefdoms were reduced. Adding the Nyamwezi Federal Council and Sukumaland Federation. By the end of British rule, commoners could be elected into positions of native power, further eroding the sovereignty of the monarchy. By 1962 all native monarchies were abolished by the new Tanganyikan government.

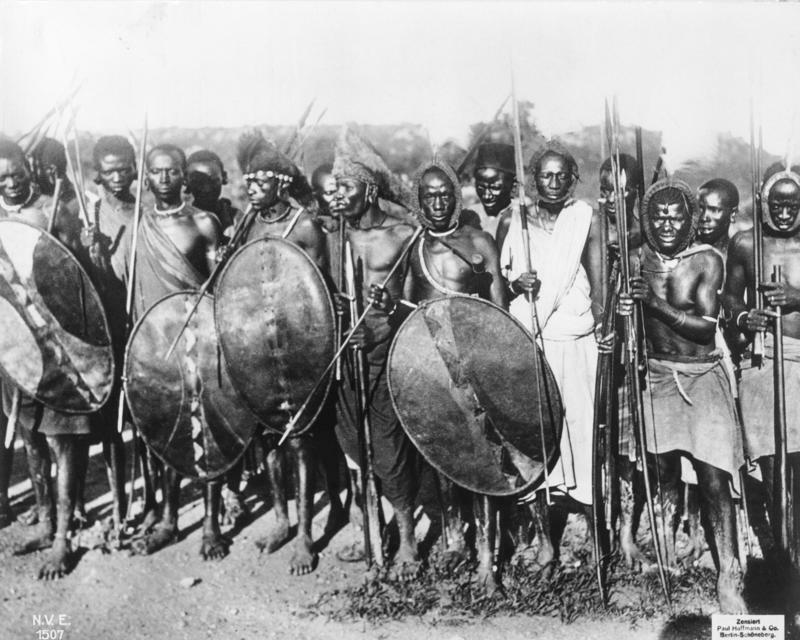
People of the region in 1914

== See also ==
- Mirambo
