= Dahl's law =

Northeast Bantu sound law

Dahl's law (German: das Dahlsche Gesetz) is a sound rule in some of the Northeast Bantu languages that illustrates a case of voicing dissimilation. In the history of these languages, a voiceless stop, such as /p t k/, became voiced (/b d ɡ/) when immediately followed by a syllable with another voiceless stop. For example, Nyamwezi has -datu "three" where Swahili, a Bantu language that did not undergo Dahl's law, has -tatu, and Shambala has mgate "bread" where Swahili has mkate. Dahl's law is the reason for the name Gikuyu when the language prefix normally found in that language is ki- .

The law was named in 1903 by Carl Meinhof in his paper "Das Dahlsche Gesetz": in the paper, Meinhof explains that he named the rule after his pupil, the Moravian missionary Edmund Dahl, who reported it in 1897 when visiting the Wanyamwezi tribe in Urambo. It is productive in Sukuma, in the Nyanyembe dialect of Nyamwezi, most E50 languages (such as Kikuyu, Embu and Meru) and some J languages (such as Rwanda, Gusii and Kuria). In other languages the law is no longer productive, but there are indications that it once was (such as in Taita, Kamba/Daisũ, Taveta and Luhya/Logooli). In some neighboring languages (and in other dialects of Nyamwezi) words reflecting Dahl's law are found, but they appear to be transfers from languages in which the law is productive.

Dahl's law is often portrayed as the African equivalent of Grassmann's law in Indo-European languages. However, an analogue of Grassmann's law (which is aspiration, not voicing, dissimilation) has taken place in the Bantu language Makhuwa, where it is called Katupha's law.
