= Kimbu =

Kimbu may be:

- Kimbu people
- Kimbu language
- Kimbu Company
- Morus plant known as Kimbu in Nepal
- known as Kimbu Honey or Mud Honey in Japanese
