= Nyamwezi =

Nyamwezi may refer to:

- Nyamwezi people, of Tanzania
- Nyamwezi language, their Bantu language
