= KCZ =

KCZ or kcz may refer to:

- Kōchi Airport (IATA: KCZ), a regional airport in Nankoku, Kōchi, Japan
- Konongo language (ISO 639-3: kcz), a Bantu language of central Tanzania
