= Iselemagazi =

Iselemagazi is a village and ward located in Shinyanga District in Shinyanga Region in Tanzania.

Iselamagazi is a Sukuma word which means “Bloodshed” and it was named so after the occurrence of a fighting between Sukuma people and Maasai people who were raiding cattle. Sukuma people, who were the original inhabitants of the place, after successfully winning the war against Maasai people, named the village “Iselamgazi” in order to honour the war for protection of their cattle and acknowledge the fact that there had been bloodshed. Iselemagazi was the capital of Mirambo from which he ruled over his domain of Urambo. In 1879 it had a population of about 15,000 people.

The postal code of Iselamagazi is 37207. According to the National Bureau of Statistics-2022 Population and Housing Census there are 18,465 people residing at Iselamagazi ward.

== Sources ==
- Dictionary of African Biography p. 224
