= Takama languages =

Group of Northeast Bantu languages

Takama
- Sukuma-Nyamwezi
- Native to: Tanzania
- Region: Shinyanga Region, Mwanza Region, Simiyu Region, Geita Region, Biharamulo District, Tabora Region, Mbeya Region
- Language family: Niger–Congo?: Atlantic–Congo; Volta-Congo; Benue–Congo; Bantoid; Southern Bantoid; Bantu; Northeast Bantu; Takama
- Early form: Proto-Takama

Language codes
- ISO 639-3: –
- Glottolog: suku1274

The Takama or Sukuma-Nyamwezi languages are a group of Northeast Bantu languages spoken south of Lake Victoria in north-central Tanzania.

== History ==
The Proto-Takama homeland was somewhere along the west of the Wembere River.

== Classification ==
The Takama languages are classified by Glottolog as follows:

- Takama
  - Nyamwezic
    - Kimbu
    - Konongo-Ruwila
    - Nyamwezi
    - Sukuma
  - Sumbwa
