= Ruga-Ruga =

Irregular troops in Eastern Africa

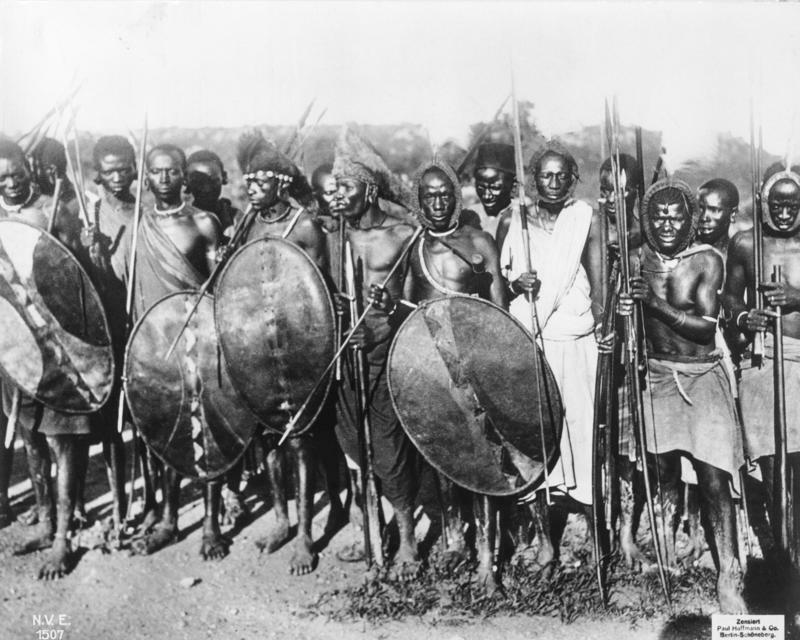
Ruga-Ruga in German East Africa, 1914

Ruga-Ruga (sometimes called Rugaruga) were irregular troops in Eastern Africa, often deployed by western colonial forces. They often served as mercenaries or local auxiliaries alongside the regular Askari, professional soldiers who were often hired in other regions of Africa. While the latter were trained by officers of the European colonial powers in Africa, the Ruga-Ruga were mostly hired from tribal warriors during times of conflict.

== History ==
The term Ruga-Ruga for armed guards in caravans and mercenary troops of Nyamwezi-chieftains dates back to at least 1820, according to Pesek. Ruga-Ruga came into knowledge first as an auxiliary force of Nyamwezi-chieftain Mirambo, dubbed the Napoleon of Africa by Henry Morton Stanley. Mirambo, a trader of ivory and slaves, gathered a militia of young men without social ties to defend his interests against the Arabs of the Swahili coast. This unit consisted mostly of former slaves or porters. Later, the word Ruga-Ruga was used to denote any unit of auxiliary troops in Eastern Africa.

In course of World War I, Ruga-Ruga fought alongside the British as well as the German side in the East African Campaign. The Askari troops of the German Schutztruppe, the armed forces of German East Africa under the command of Paul von Lettow-Vorbeck, were often supported by ruga-ruga units of approximately the same size. The ruga-ruga thus effectively doubled the manpower of the German colonial forces after the outbreak of war. Overall, the British War Office estimated that over 12,000 Ruga-Ruga in total served with the Germans during the war. They were most prominent at the western borders of German East Africa, due to the fact that only very few regular Schutztruppe forces were active there. Their reliability in combat varied greatly, however, as Ruga-Ruga often fought for personal reasons such as tribal rivalries and desire for fame and plunder. They were thus equally likely to fight courageously as to flee and desert.

When Lettow-Vorbeck accepted the armistice on 23 November 1918 after four years of guerilla warfare and severe casualties on both sides and among civilians, the mixed force of ruga-ruga, some askaris and a few German survivors was the last unit to surrender in World War I.

== Cultural heritage ==
Iron breaks the head, a war song of the ruga-ruga, is still sung in today's Tanzania. It can be sometimes heard at political gatherings.

== Bibliography ==
- Pesek, Michael (2014). "Ruga-ruga: The History of an African Profession, 1820–1918". In Nina Berman; Klaus Mühlhahn; Patrice Nganang (eds.). German Colonialism Revisited: African, Asian, and Oceanic Experiences. Ann Arbor, Michigan: University of Michigan Press. pp. 85–100.
