= Schutztruppe =

African colonial troops of the German Empire

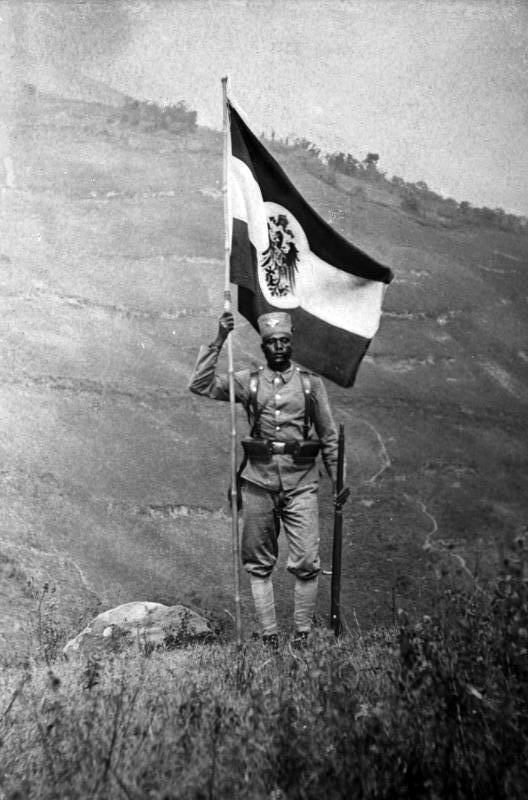
- Schutztruppe Askari flag carrier, German East Africa, 1906
- Active: 1891–1918
- Disbanded: 28 June 1919
- Allegiance: German Empire
- Type: Infantry
- Size: 80,330 troops (including Seebataillon III (3rd Marine Battalion) and 200 camels
- Engagements: Abushiri revolt Adamawa Wars; Herero Wars; Herero and Nama genocide World War I: African theatre of World War I; Asian and Pacific theatre of World War I

Schutztruppe (German: [ˈʃʊtsˌtʁʊpə], lit. Protection Force) was the official name of the colonial troops in the African territories of the German colonial empire from the late 19th century to 1918. Similar to other colonial armies, the Schutztruppen consisted of volunteer European commissioned and non-commissioned officers, medical and veterinary officers. Most enlisted ranks were recruited from indigenous communities within the German colonies or from elsewhere in Africa.

Military contingents were formed in German East Africa, where they became famous as Askari, in the Kamerun colony of German West Africa, and in German South West Africa. Control of the German colonies of New Guinea, in Samoa, and in Togoland was performed by small local police detachments. Kiautschou in China under Imperial Navy administration was a notable exception. As part of the East Asian Station the navy garrisoned Qingdao with the marines of Seebataillon III, the only all-German unit with permanent status in an overseas protectorate.

== Deployment ==
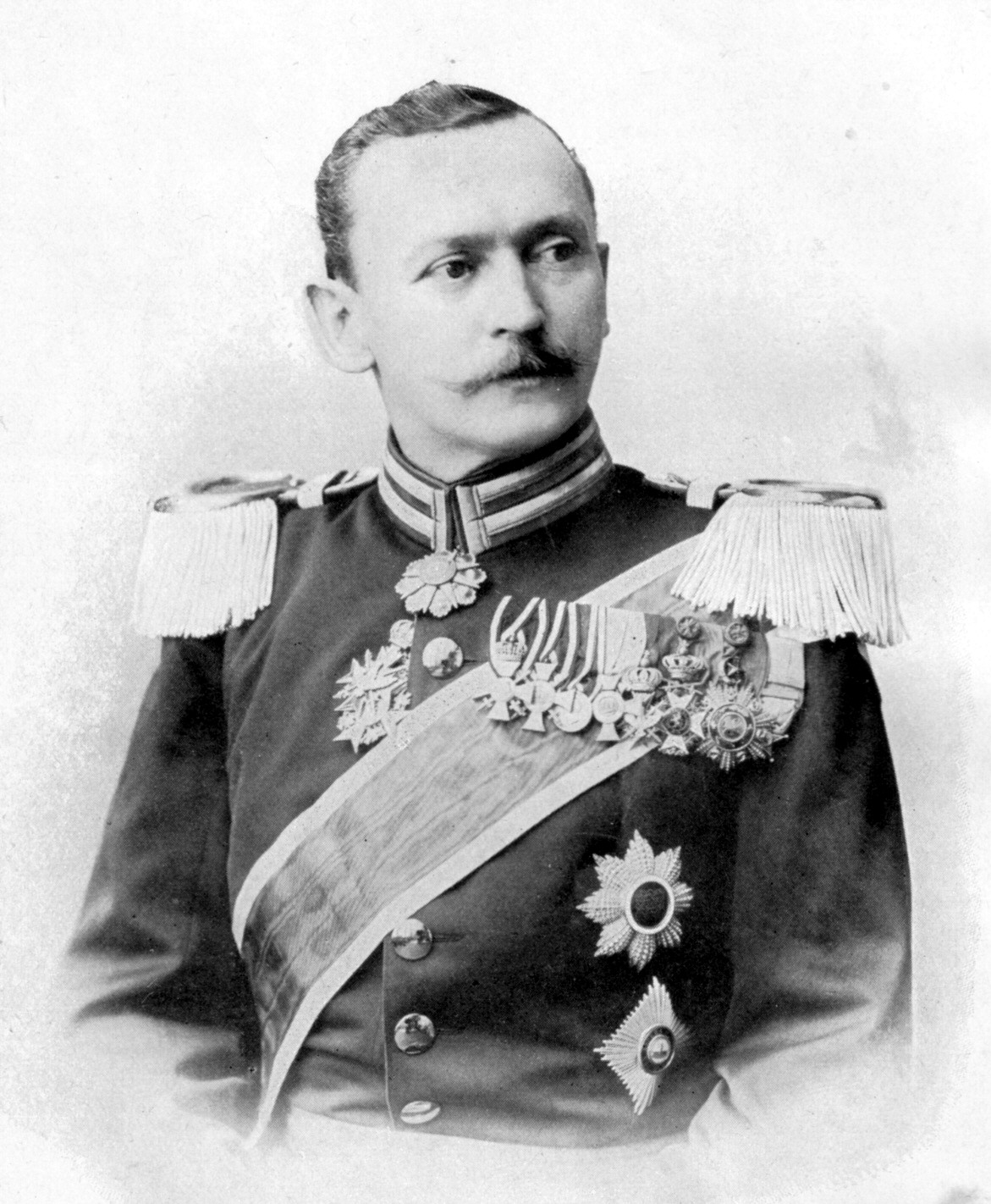
Hermann Wissmann

The name of the German colonial force dates back to the parlance of Chancellor Otto von Bismarck, who had the term Schutzgebiete, "protectorates", used instead of colonies. Schutztruppe contingents arose from local police forces or private paramilitary units, where German colonizers met with stronger resistance.

When in 1888 the Abushiri revolt broke out in the dominions of the German East Africa Company, Bismarck's government in Berlin had to send mercenary troops under Reichskommissar Hermann Wissmann to subdue the uprising. Upon the establishment of German East Africa, this Wissmanntruppe was changed to Schutztruppe by an act of the Reichstag parliament on 22 March 1891. The police forces for South-West Africa under Curt von François and for German Cameroon were re-established as Schutztruppe by the act of 9 June 1895.

Schutztruppe formations under the supreme command of the German Emperor were organizationally never a part of the Imperial German Army, though German military law and discipline applied to its units. Initially supervised by the Imperial Navy Office, they were under the authority of the Colonial Department in the German Foreign Office by the act of 7 and 18 July 1896. In 1907 the Colonial Department with the Schutztruppe command was set up as the independent Imperial Colonial Office (Reichskolonialamt) agency directly answerable to the Chancellor of Germany.

In 1896 a central Schutztruppe command (Kommando der Schutztruppen) was established as part of the Colonial Department. Despite its name, this agency exercised no military leadership but served as an administrative authority. It was located at Berlin’s Mauerstrasse, in proximity to the Colonial Office. At the beginning of the First World War in 1914, there were three Schutztruppe military commands, one in each of the German colonial regions in East Africa, South-West Africa, and in Kamerun, subordinate to each governor.

== German East Africa ==
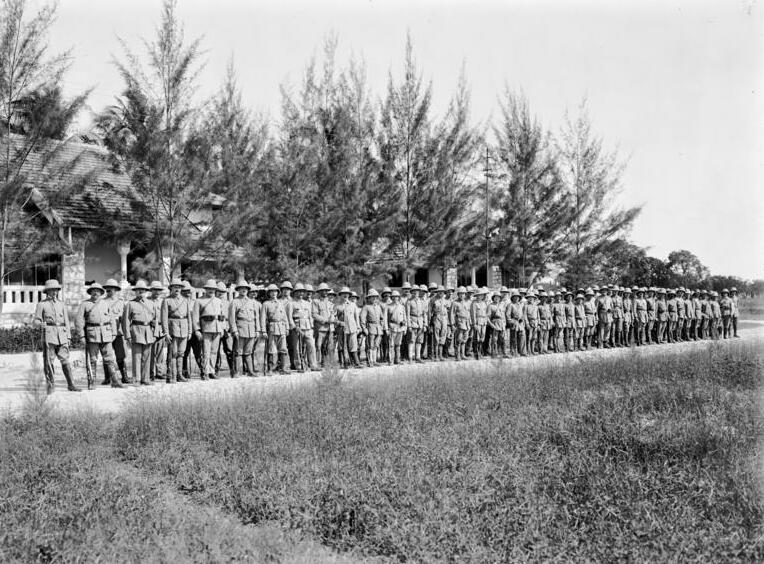
Schutztruppen, colonial volunteer contingent, German East Africa, photograph by Walther Dobbertin, 1914

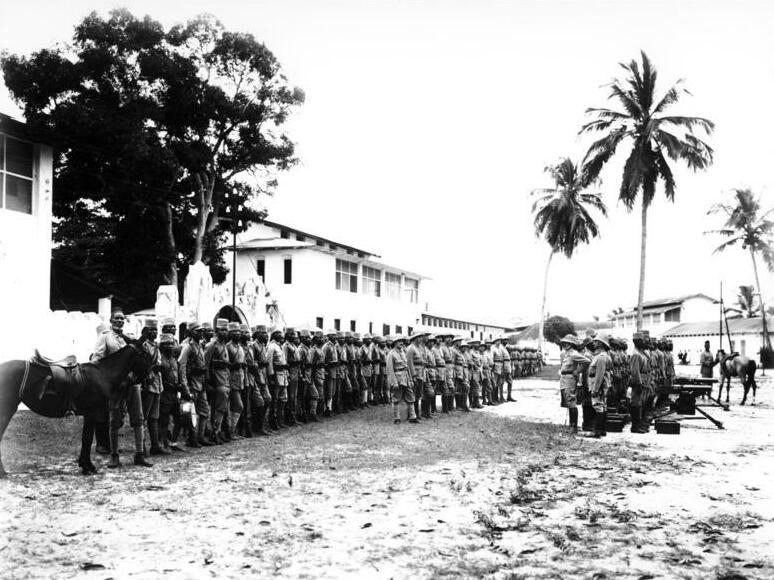
Schutztruppen, Askari company formation, German East Africa, 1914

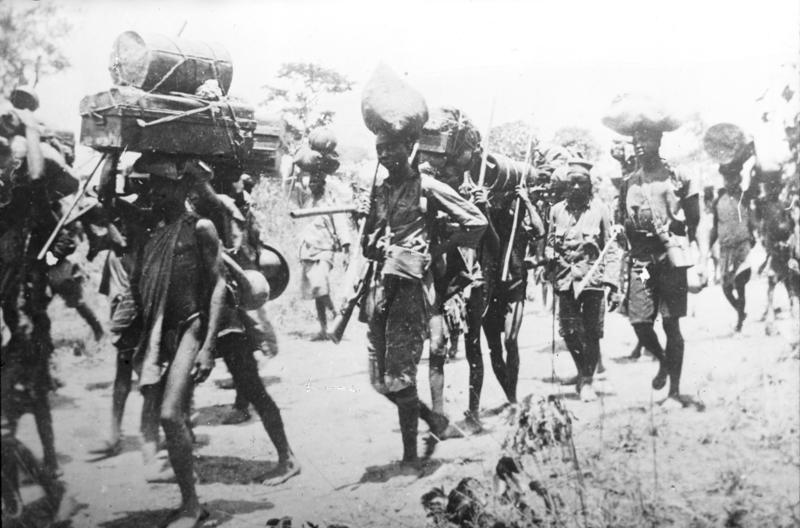
Schutztruppen, carriers, German East Africa, 1899

At the outbreak of the First World War, the Schutztruppe in German East Africa was organised into 14 field companies (Feldkompanien) with 2,500 men under arms, with headquarters at the capital Dar es Salaam. Including carriers and labourers, the force had about 14,000 personnel. On 13 April 1914, Lieutenant Colonel Paul von Lettow-Vorbeck assumed command in German East Africa. He led his units throughout the First World War, eventually being promoted to Generalmajor. The Schutztruppe in East Africa became the last German formation to surrender – days after the armistice of 11 November 1918.

A pre-war company consisted of 160 (expandable to 200) men in three platoons (Züge) of 50 to 60 men each, including two machine-gun teams. Each of the 14 companies also had a minimum 250 man carrier contingent as well as native irregulars known as Ruga-Ruga, called Fita-Fita in German Samoa, of approximately the same size units.

- 1st Company (Kompagnie): Arusha/Neu Moshi
- 2nd Company: Iringa and Unbena
- 3rd Company: Lindi
- 4th Company: Kilimatinde and Singida (Dodoma ?)
- 5th Company: Massoko (Langenburg)
- 6th Company: Udjidiji and Kassulo
- 7th Company: Bukoba, Ussuwi and Kifumbiro
- 8th Company: Tabora
- 9th Company: Usumbura
- 10th Company: Dar es Salaam
- 11th Company: Kissenji and Mruhengeri
- 12th Company: Mahenge
- 13th Company: Kondoa Irangi
- 14th Company: Muansa and Ikoma

The Dar es Salaam garrison further included a recruitment depot, a signals department and quartermaster unit.

Overall strength was 300 European recruits and 2,472 Africans, specifically 68 combatant officers, 60 warrant officers and NCOs, 132 non-combatant medical officers, civilian administrators, ammunition technicians, and 2 African officers and 184 African NCOs and 2,286 Askari. Lastly there was the Polizeitruppe, formed in 1909, with 60 German and around 2,000 experienced askari which was reintegrated into the Schutztruppe as soon as war erupted.

During the First World War, companies numbered 15 through 30 were added, plus eight (A through G, and L) temporary companies; and 1st through 10th Schützenkompagnies [rifle companies]. The Schützenkompagnies were originally composed of white settlers, their sons, plantations administrators and trading company employees but some units became racially mixed as the war dragged on. Numerous other small detachments were also formed. Several, possibly four, Reserve Kompagnien were also raised consisting of older Askari, they were prefixed by the letter "R".

== German South West Africa ==
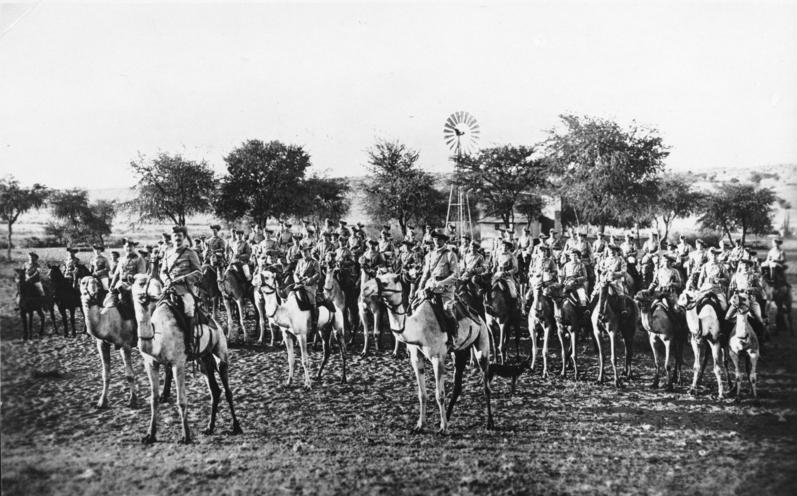
Camel cavalry, German South West Africa, 1904

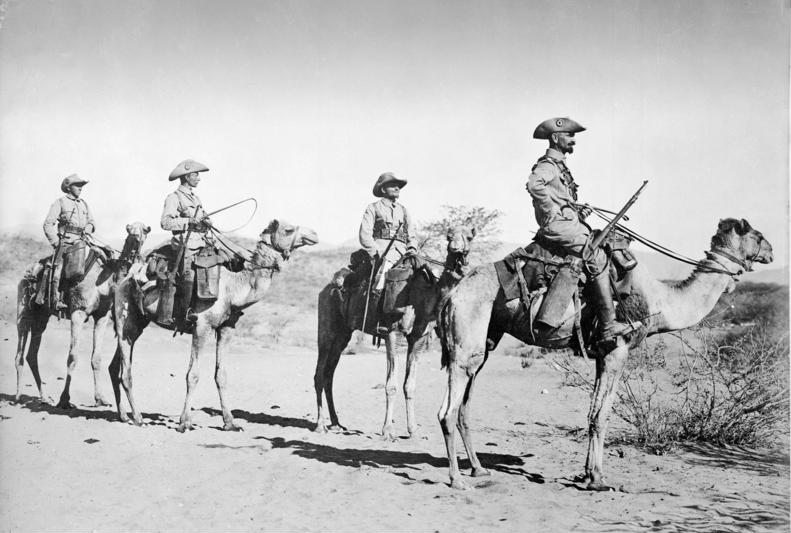
Camel patrol, German South West Africa, 1907

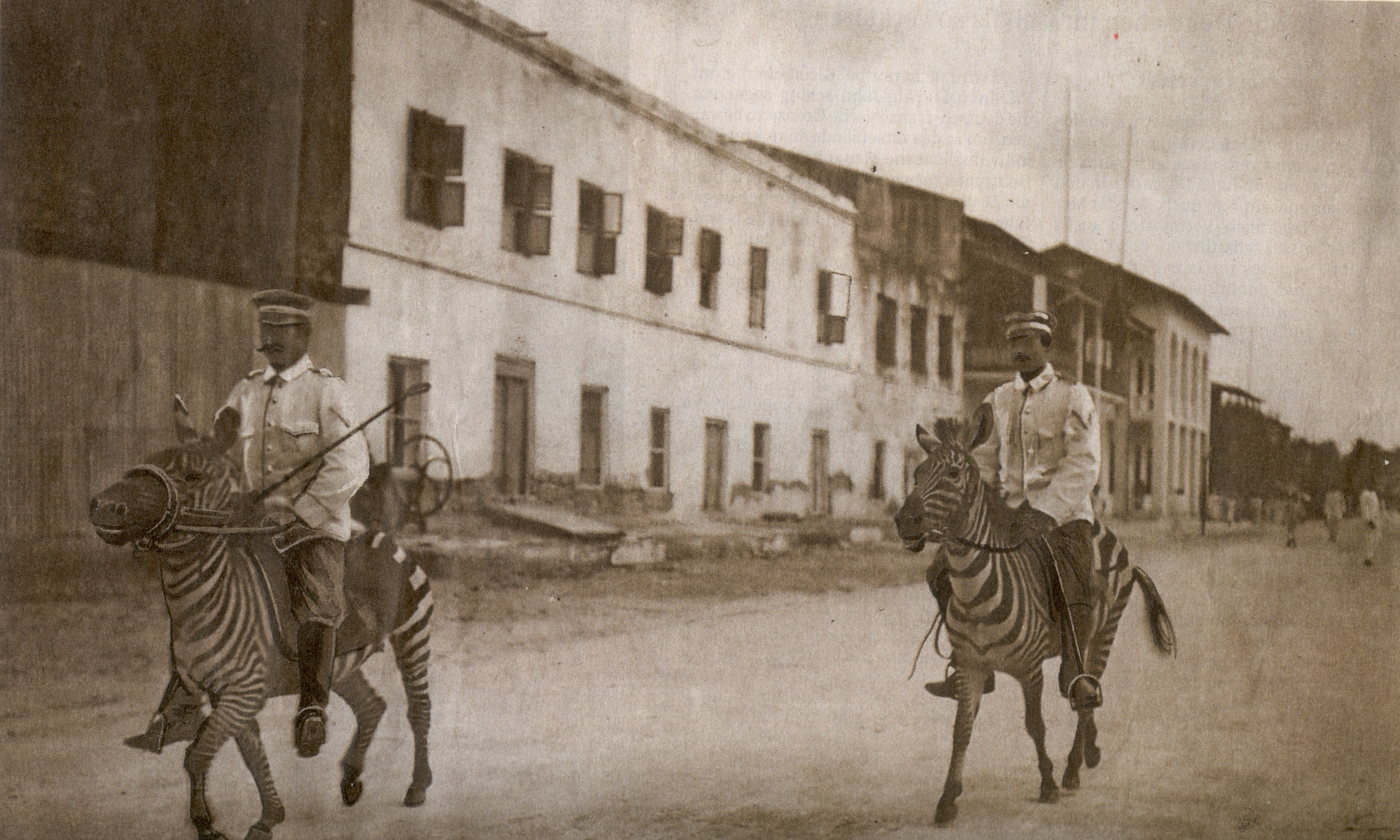
Zebra cavalry, German East Africa, 1911

The Schutztruppe in German South West Africa was structured in 12 companies of mounted infantry totalling 1,500 men, primarily Germans. The 7th Company, stationed in the northern desert area of the colony, was mounted on imported camels. A single unit, called the Baster Company, consisting of non-local biracial white European-black Africans, was raised and deployed. Relations between the German administration and the natives in this colony had deteriorated to the point that few local Africans were recruited. Some Boers and Afrikaners were able to be recruited, bolstering the fledgling force.

The colonial forces for German Southwest Africa consisted of volunteers from the Imperial Army and Navy (including some Austrians) but essentially consisted of members of German regiments. Before their deployment to Africa these troops were prepared for their special tasks and future environment. Such a training base was at Karlsruhe. Because of the often humid conditions in the upper Rhine valley of the Grand Duchy of Baden, the area provided some early acclimatisation.

The structure of the South West African forces was as follows:

German South West Africa Command at Windhuk (modern Windhoek) consisted of headquarters, administration and legal (judge advocate), medical corps, surveying and mapping units.

Northern district command: Windhuk

- 1st Company: Regenstein, Seeis
- 4th Company: Okanjande
- 6th Company: Outjo and Otavi
- 2nd Battery: Johann-Albrechts-Höhe
- Transport platoon 1: Karibib
- Office for provisions: Karibib
- Horse depot: Okawayo
- Artillery and train depot: Windhuk
- Military hospital and medical depot: Windhuk
- Clothing depot: Windhuk
- Local headquarters: Windhuk
- Local headquarters and quartermaster: Swakopmund

Southern district command: Keetmanshoop

- 2nd Company: Ukamas
- 3rd Company: Kanus
- 5th Company: Chamis and Churutabis
- 7th and 8th Company (camel cavalry), military hospital: Gochas and Arahoab
- 1st Battery: Narubis
- 3rd Battery: Gibeon
- Transport platoon 2: Keetmanshoop
- Artillery and train depot: Keetmanshoop
- Military hospital and medical depot: Keetmanshoop
- Clothing depot: Keetmanshoop
- Office for provisions: Keetmanshoop
- Garrison administration: Keetmanshoop
- Horse depot: Aus
- Camel stud farm: Kalkfontein
- Local headquarters and quartermaster: Lüderitz

At the outbreak of the war the force had a total strength of 91 officers, 22 physicians, 9 veterinarians, 59 civilian administrators, ammunition technicians, 342 NCOs and 1,444 German other ranks for a total of 1,967 personnel.

== German West Africa ==
=== Kamerun ===
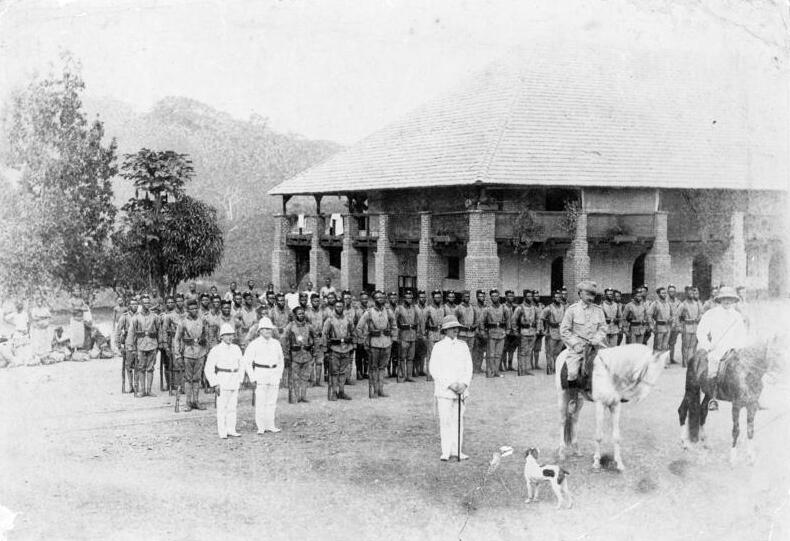
Schutztruppe contingent of 5th field company at Ebolowa, Kamerun, 1894

German West Africa encompassed two colonial entities, Kamerun and Togoland.

The Kamerun force in 1914 consisted of 12 companies, totalling 1,600 men with headquarters at Soppo and established in 1894 from the existing police force (formed in 1891).

The structure of the Kamerun forces was as follows:

Central Command: Soppo near the capital Buea

- 1st Company (headquarters company) and artillery detachment: Douala
- 2nd Company: Bamenda, Wum and Kentu
- 3rd Company: Mora and Kusseri
- 4th Company: (expedition/survey company): Soppo
- 5th Company: Bouar, Carnot and Ebolowa
- 6th Company: Mbaiki, Nola and Nguku
- 7th Company: Garua, Marua, Mubi
- 8th Company: Ngaundere
- 9th Company: Dume and Baturi
- 10th Company: Ojem and Mimwoul
- 11th Company: Akoafim and Minkebe
- 12th Company: Bumo, Fianga, and Gore

The companies were assigned to 49 garrisons in Kamerun and consisted of 61 officers, 23 physicians, 23 civilian administrators, ammunition technicians, 98 German NCOs and 1,650 African enlisted ranks for a total personnel count of 1,855.

=== Togoland ===
Togoland had a total police force of 673 personnel deployed throughout the colony. Approximately 1,000 troops were raised after the outbreak of the war. With very little arms, ammunition, or provisions, by the end of August 1914, all units had surrendered to French and British forces.

== Appearance ==
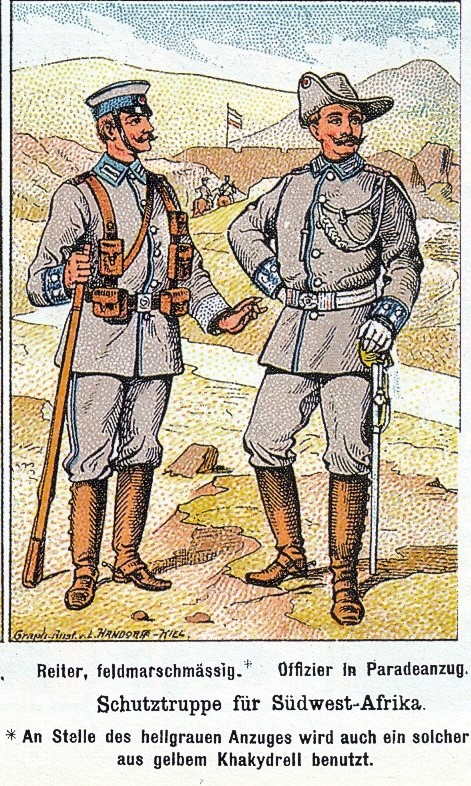
A Schutztruppe officer and soldier wearing grey uniforms

When the Schutztruppe for German East Africa was founded in 1891, special uniforms were created which, among other things, were intended to underline the special position of the Schutztruppe as an independent part of the Reichsheer. The uniforms corresponded to the cut of the Prussian Army, initially in grey but later in "field gray" for home service ("Tuchuniform"/"Tuchrock") or khaki ("Feldrock") for the tropics. Schutztruppen in Southwest Africa could wear the home service uniform in the protectorate. A khaki service dress was worn by all ranks while a white dress uniform was worn by European officers and NCOs for ceremonial occasions, both white and khaki uniforms were cut the same with four patch pockets and a stand and fall collar. The Schutztruppe arm of service color was blue so their uniforms were trimmed blue down the trousers seam, the fly of their tunic, collar edge, plus NCO's wore silver on blue inverted chevrons on the left sleeve only They were also supplied a grey or khaki slouch hat called the Schutztruppenhut (aka Südwester) on which the edge of the hat and the cap band were in the color of the respective Schutztruppe. The protectorate colours were as follows; German East Africa white, Cameroon dark red, German South West Africa cornflower blue, Togo yellow, German New Guinea green, German Samoa light pink. Additionally, as Imperial Troops, the 'Reichskokarde' cockade in black, white and red was worn on the folded brim of the Schutztruppenhut, a black, white and red cord could be worn around the tropical helmet (Tropenhelm), and black, white and red intertwined shoulder straps were worn on both tunic shoulders.

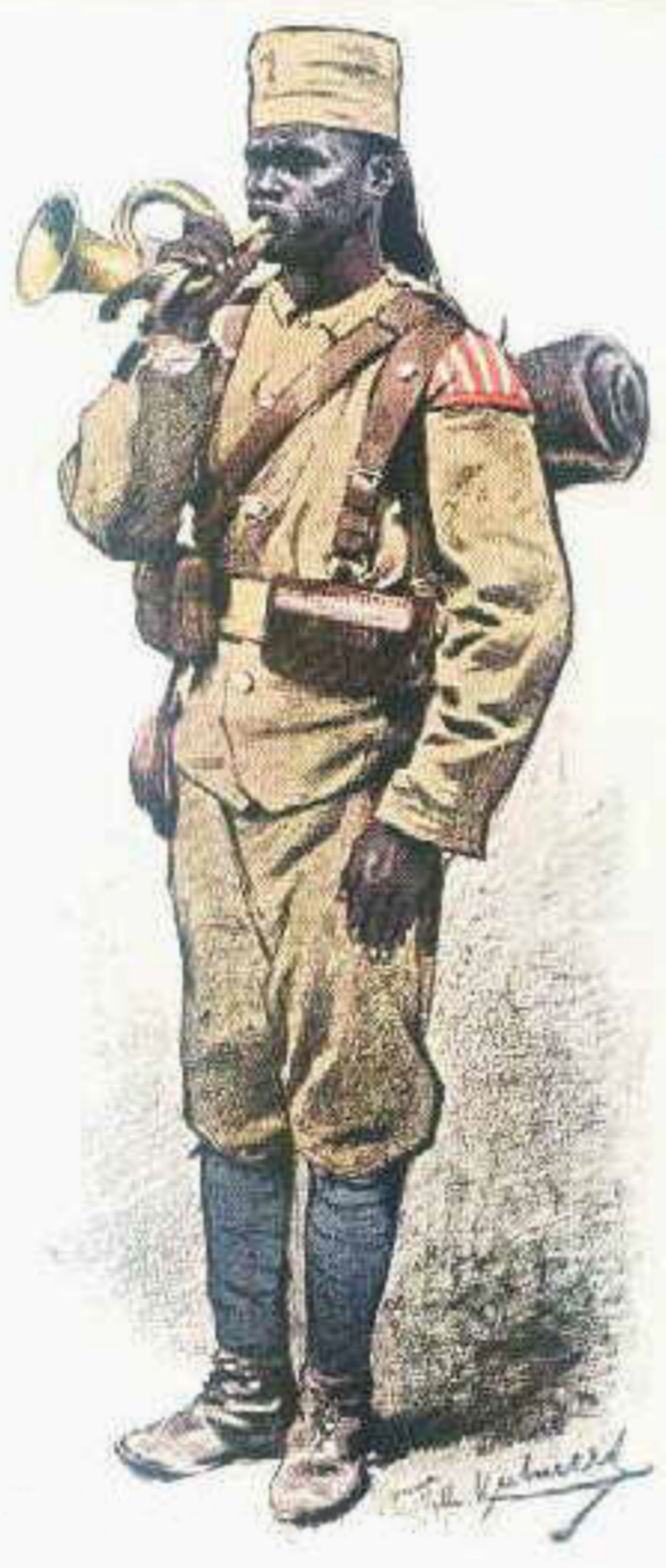
An Askari trumpeter of the Schutztruppe wearing swallow's nests (1914)

Schutztruppe Askaris wore a pocketless cotton khaki tunic and breeches with blue puttees and ankle boots, which replaced bare lower legs and feet. African personnel also wore a red fez over which a khaki cover could be worn in the field. Company numbers were often worn on the front of the fez. In field conditions the askari wore either a khaki cover over their red fez or a khaki tarbush consisting of a khaki cloth over a wicker frame. Later in the war African troops wore a large floppy hat en lieu of the fez. The arm of service color for African/native troops was red so their uniforms, when trimmed, were trimmed red down the trousers seam, the tunic fly, collar edge, plus NCO's wore red, later brown, chevrons on the left sleeve only.

== Ranks and insignia ==
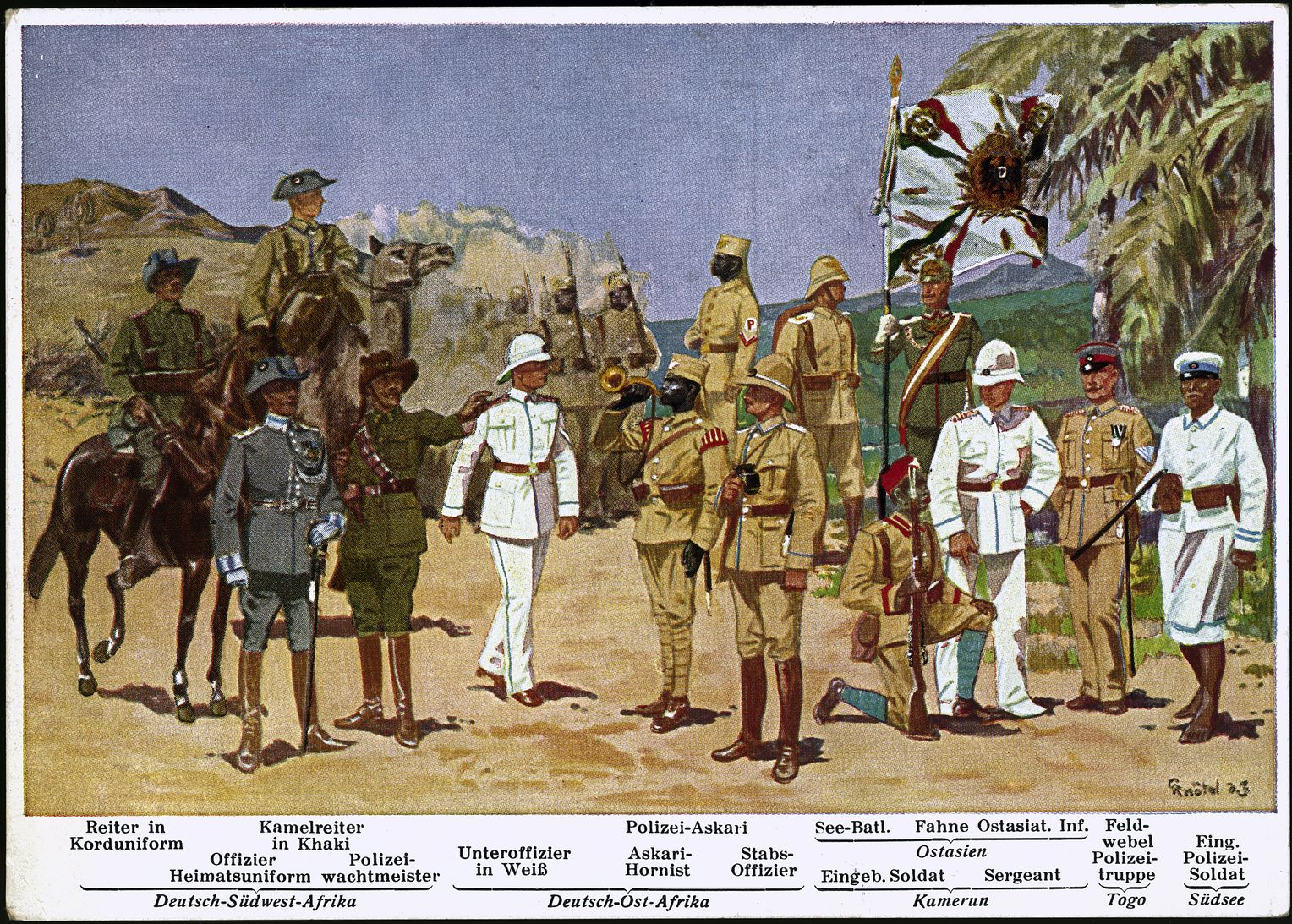
Schutztruppen in Afrika

The rank insignia of Africans differed by one chevron from German ranks (eg. a German Gefreiter wore no chevrons, an African wore one, a German Unteroffizier wore one chevron, and African wore two etc). Despite them having nominally similar ranks, European NCOs always outranked Native NCOs.

German/European Ranks: Standard Imperial Army collar and or shoulder rank insignia was worn by German/European Officers and men.

Rank group	Unteroffiziere ohne Portepee				Enlisted
Schutztruppe					No insignia
Schutztruppe	Feldwebel	Vizefeldwebel	Sergeant	Unteroffizier	Gefreiter

=== German East Africa ===
Many of the original East African Askaris were Sudanese therefore the East African Schutztruppen utilized existing Turkish rank titles. The following ranks existed for East African other ranks:

- Effendi - Sudanese officers (East Africa only) inherited from the Wissmann-Truppe - originally wore one to three, but later only three, silver stars on the shoulder straps
- Senior Sergeant - Feldwebel/Sol - four flat-topped inverted chevrons
- Sergeant - Sargenten/Bet Schausch - three flat-topped inverted chevrons
- Corporal - Unteroffizier/Schausch - two flat-topped inverted chevrons
- Private - Gefreiter/Ombascha - one flat-topped inverted chevron

=== German West Africa ===
Officers

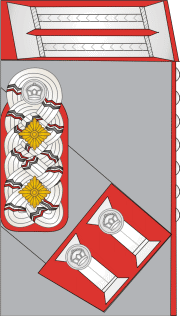
Oberst

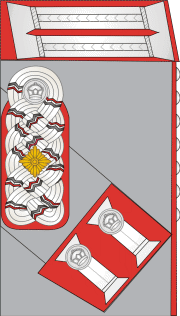
Oberstleutnant

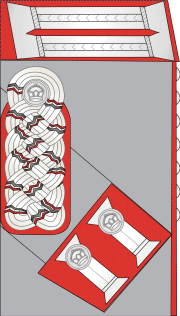
Major

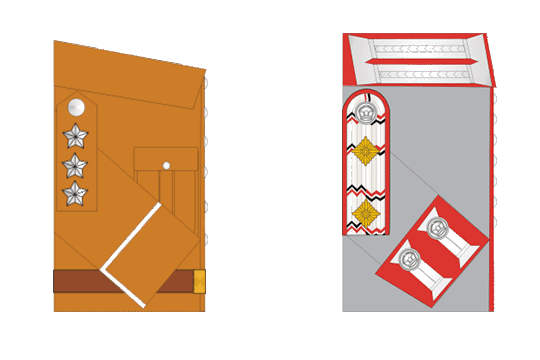
Hauptmann

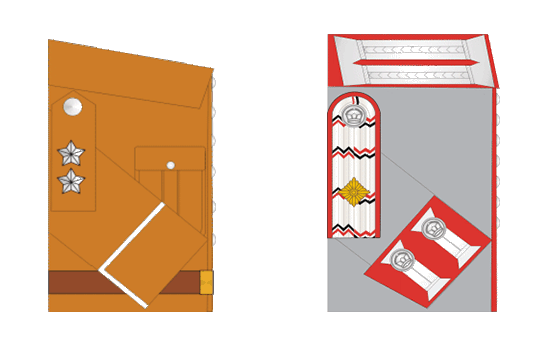
Oberleutnant

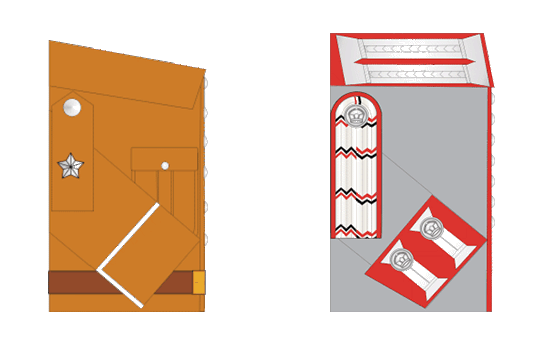
Leutnant

German other ranks

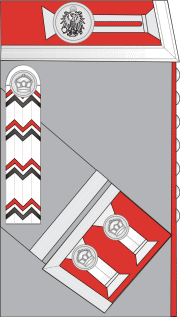
Feldwebel

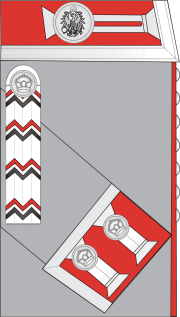
Vizefeldwebel, Sergeant

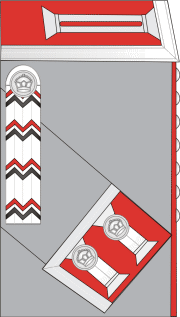
Unteroffizier

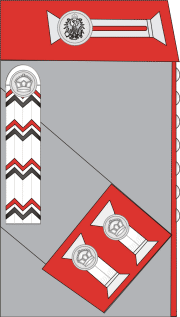
Gefreiter

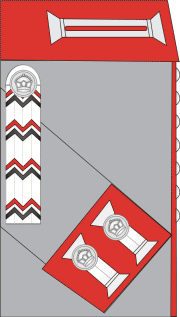
Gemeiner

African other ranks

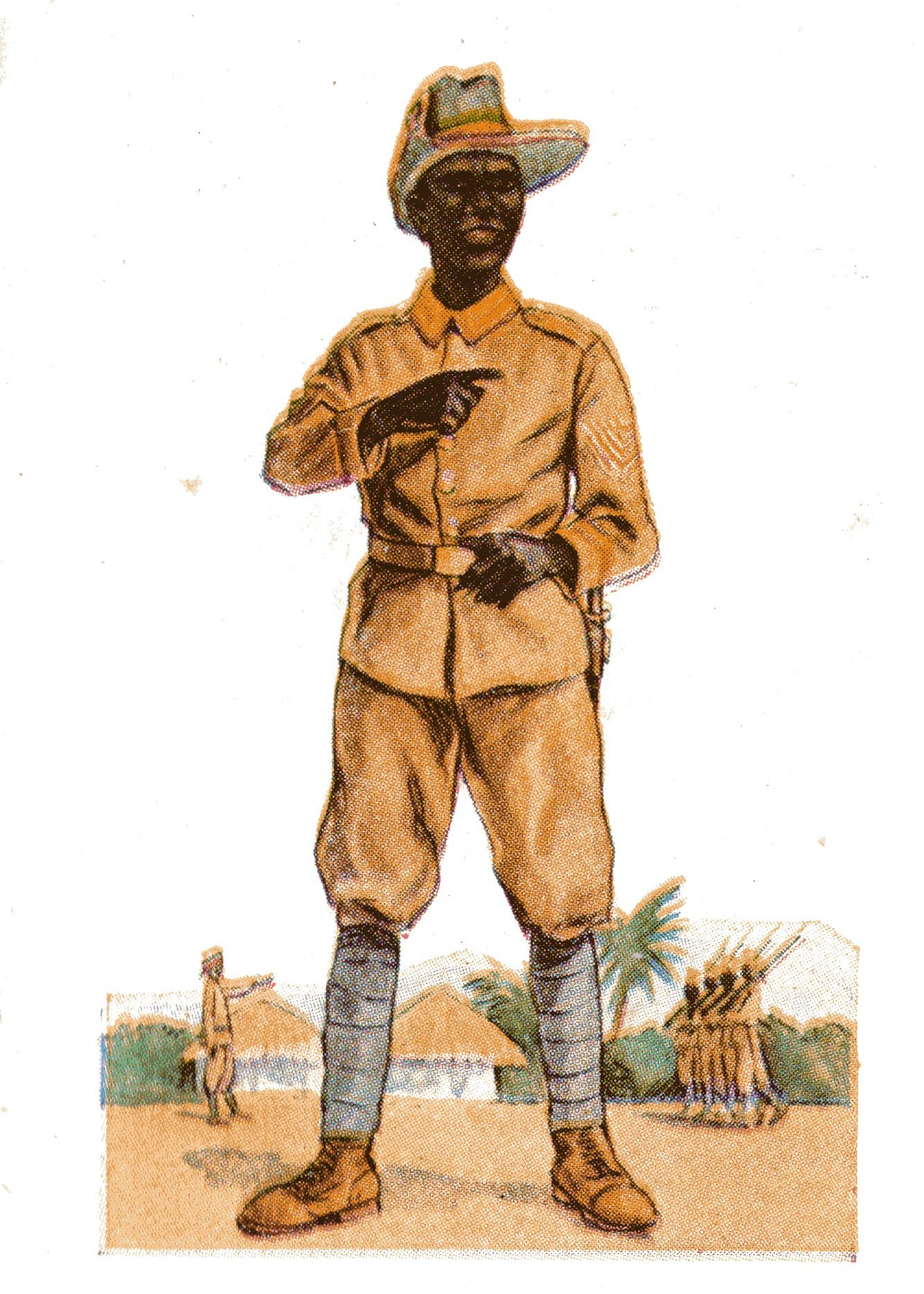
African Feldwebel, ca 1910.

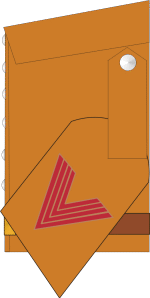
Feldwebel

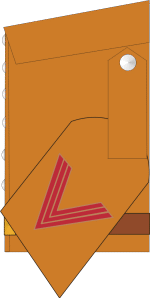
Sergeant

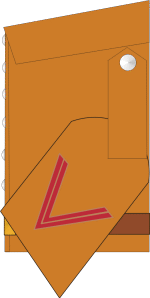
Unteroffizier

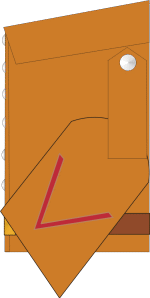
Gefreiter

== Bibliography ==
- Farwell, Byron. The Great War in Africa, 1914–1918. New York: W. W. Norton & Company. 1989. ISBN 0-393-30564-3
- Haupt, Werner. Deutschlands Schutzgebiete in Übersee 1884–1918 [Germany’s Overseas Protectorates 1884-1918]. Friedberg: Podzun-Pallas Verlag. 1984. ISBN 3-7909-0204-7
- Hoyt, Edwin P. Guerilla. Colonel von Lettow-Vorbeck and Germany's East African Empire. New York: Macmillan Publishing Co., Inc. 1981; and London: Collier Macmillan Publishers. 1981. ISBN 0-02-555210-4.
- Miller, Charles. Battle for the Bundu: The First World War in German East Africa. London: Macdonald & Jane's, 1974; and New York: Macmillan Publishing Co., Inc. 1974. ISBN 0-02-584930-1.

== Literature ==
- German Colonial Encyclopaedia, 1920, Volume III, p. 321ff.
- Kopf, Werner. The German colonial force 1889/1918, Dörfler Publishing House
- Morlang, Thomas. Askari und Fitafita. Farbige Söldner in den deutsche Kolonien. Berlin 2008
- Reith, Wolfgang. The Command Authorities of the Imperial Colonial Force in the Homeland. German Soldier Yearbook 2000 and 2001 (2 parts). Munich: Signal Publishing House.
