= Soppo =

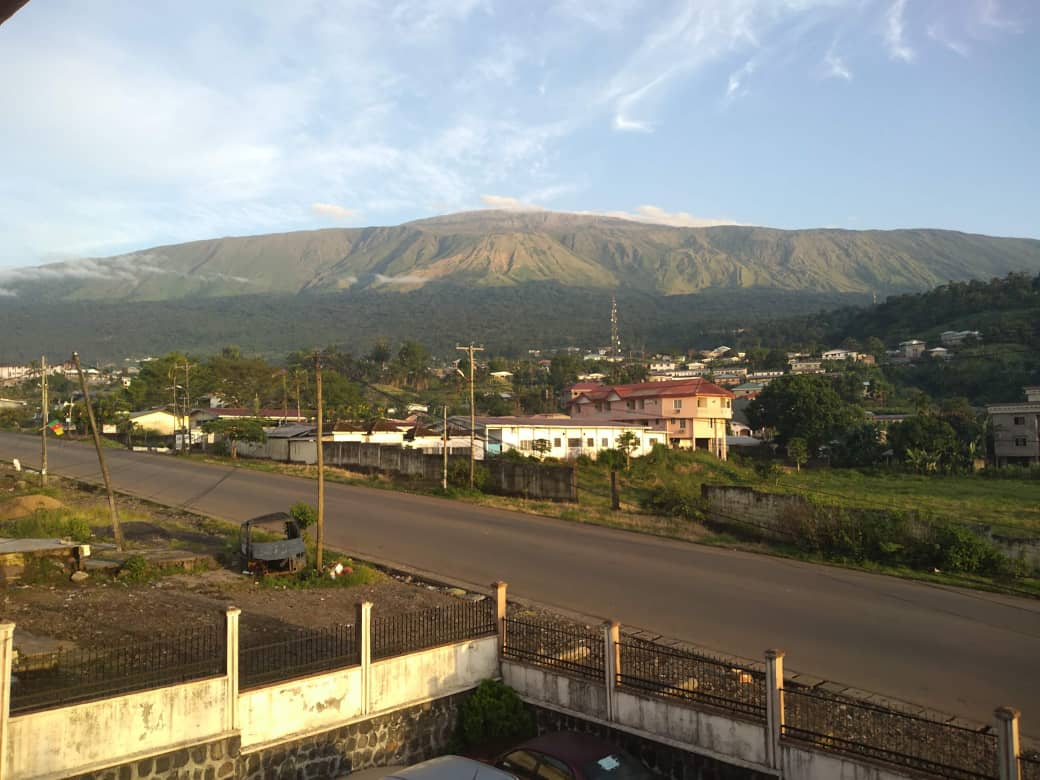

- Location in Cameroon
- Coordinates: 4°9′N 9°17′E
- Country: Cameroon
- Province: South West Province
- Elevation: 2,300 ft (700 m)

Great Soppo is made of five villages; Sovereign Soppo Mokongo, Soppo wôganga, soppo wôvila, soppo wôteke and soppo likôkô in Fako division, SWR Cameroon. It is located at around 4°9′N 9°17′E.

From 1904 to 1914 in the reign of HRM. Chief Thomas Nganje Wôsé, Great Soppo was the headquarters of the German colonial military forces ("Schutztruppe"). Because of its moderate temperatures, owing to the altitude of the village (approximately 700 m), the Baptist missionary Carl Jacob Bender turned Great Soppo into a retreat for missionaries in the coastal regions of Cameroon. The church he built in the 1930s still hovers above the village.

The present-day traditional ruler of Great Soppo is His Royal Monarch Chief Dr. ABSALOM WÔLÓA EWUMBUE-MONONO amid councilors like Matanga Monono, Nganda Tônga, Liombe Becke, Kinge Monono and others who work in synergy to pursue betterment of the Soppo communities.

== Overview ==
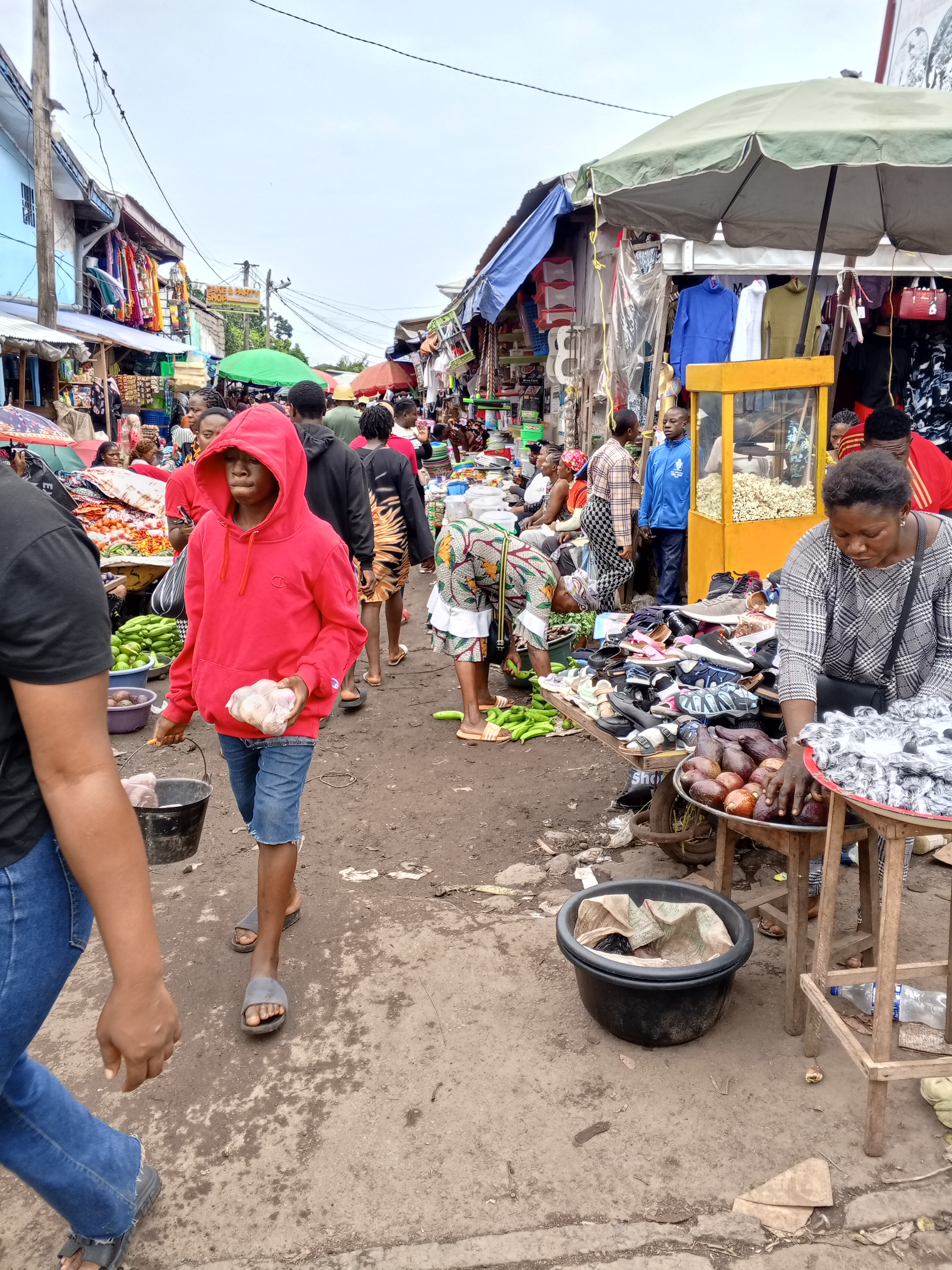
The main entrance to Soppo Market.

Great Soppo is a second class chiefdom in the Buea Municipality preceded by a then fraternity known as Soppo (Soppo Mokongo) NDENNE. The village has a female chief (môlana ndene); Aunty Fanni Ndive who administers and adjudicates the socio-economic ventures of soppo women as well as their wellbeing since the disappearance of her predecessor Emma Môjôkô Muaka in July 2026. Great soppo is multiracial in nature with lots of socio-cultural activities such as traditional wrestling (wészùå), fatal end of year football games, life celebrations and more. An imperative characteristic of Great soppo comprises the enormous royal ménage where sovereignty lives.

== Gallery ==
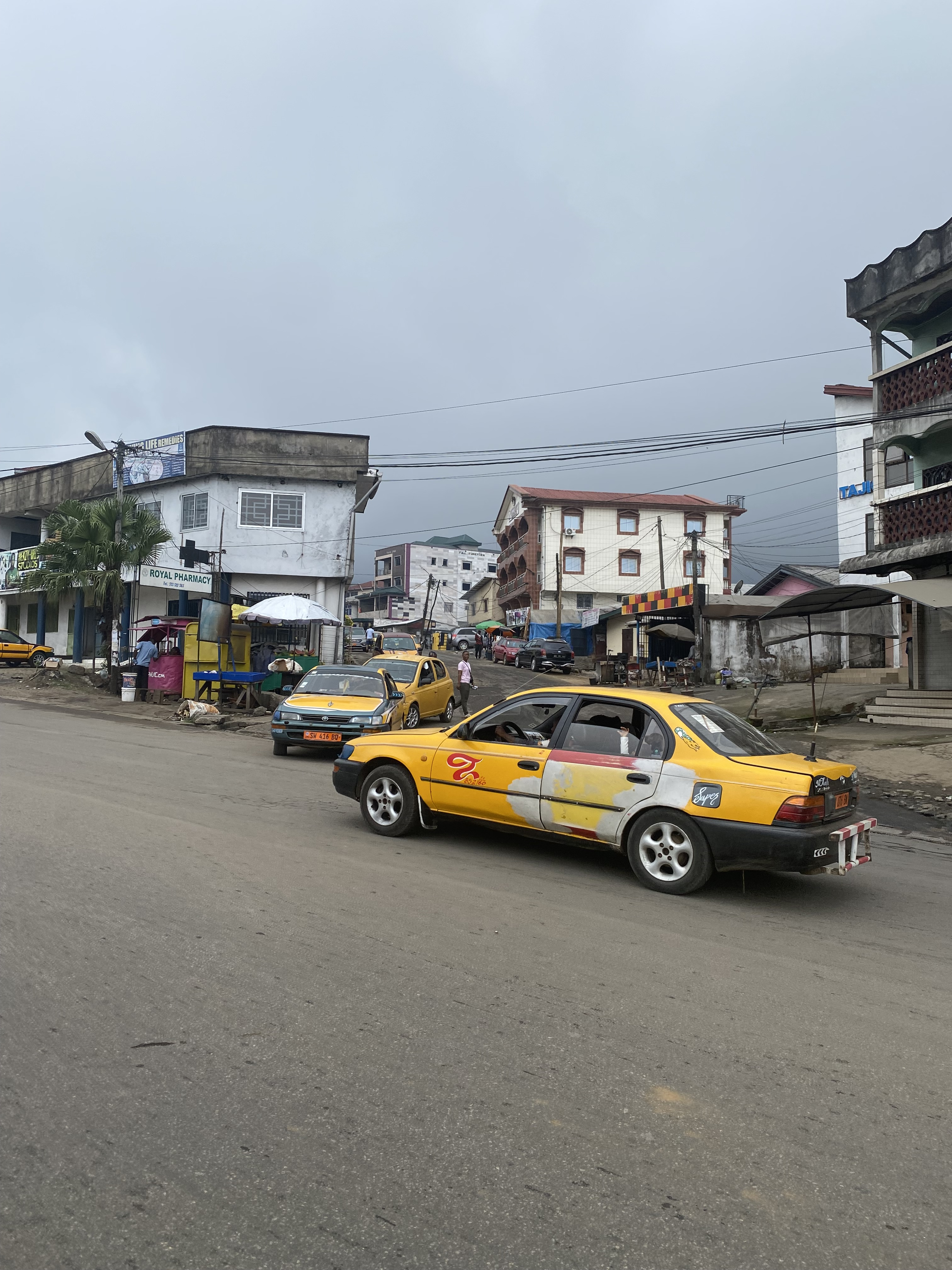
Campaign Street Junction.
