= Nyamwezi people =

Ethnic group from Tabora Region of Tanzania

Nyamwezi
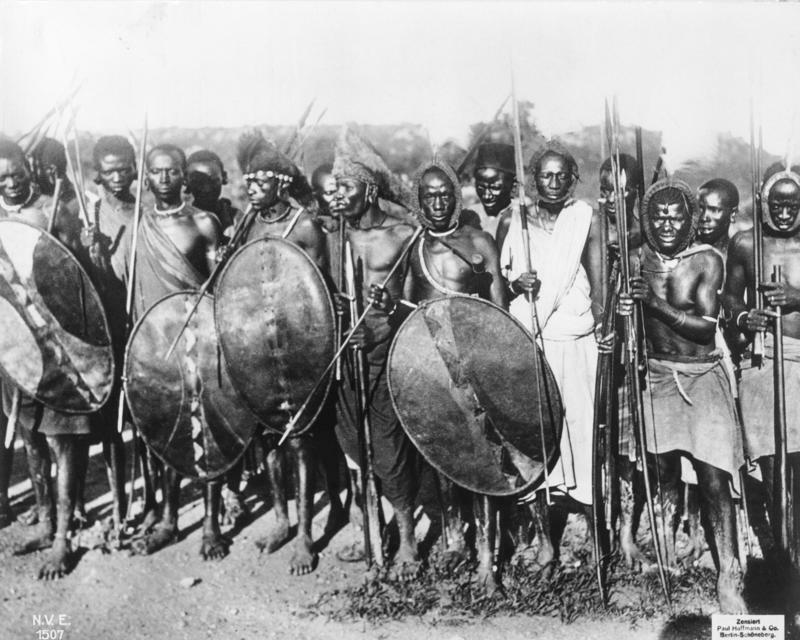
- Nyamwezi people in German East Africa, 1914

Total population
- 5 million

Regions with significant populations
- Tanzania

Languages
- Nyamwezi

Religion
- Christianity, Islam, African Traditional Religion

Related ethnic groups
- Sukuma people

Nyamwezi
- Person: Mnyamwezi
- People: Wanyamwezi
- Language: Kinyamwezi
- Country: Unyamwezi

The Nyamwezi are one of the Bantu groups of East Africa. They are the second-largest ethnic group in Tanzania. The Nyamwezi people's ancestral homeland is in parts of Tabora Region, Singida Region, Shinyanga Region and Katavi Region. The term Nyamwezi is of Swahili origin, and translates as "people of the moon" or "people of the west", the latter being more meaningful to the context.

Historically, there have been five ethnic groups, all of which referring to themselves as Wanyamwezi to outsiders: Kimbu, Konongo, Nyamwezi, Sukuma, and Sumbwa, who were never united. All groups normally merged have broadly similar cultures, but it is an oversimplification to view them as a single group. The Nyamwezi have close ties with the Sukuma and are believed to have been one ethnic group up until the Nyamwezi started their forays to the Coast for long distance trade. The Sukuma would refer to the Nyamwezi as the Dakama, meaning 'people of the south', and the Dakama would refer to the Sukuma as 'people of the north'. Their homeland is called Unyamwezi, and they speak the language Kinyamwezi, but many also speak Swahili or English.

Ancient Indian texts refer to the Nyamwezi, or 'the men of the moon', a term still in use to identify the Nyamwezi people in Tanzania.

It was only in the 19th century that the name could be found in European literature; the term might include almost anyone from the western plateau. Travel taught them that others called them Nyamwezi, and almost all men accepted the name given to them by the coastal people indicating that the Nyamwezi came from the west. A century later, their land is still called "Greater Unyamwezi", about 35,000 square miles (91,000 km^{2}) of rolling land at an elevation of about 4,000 feet (1,200 m).

== History ==
=== Early history ===
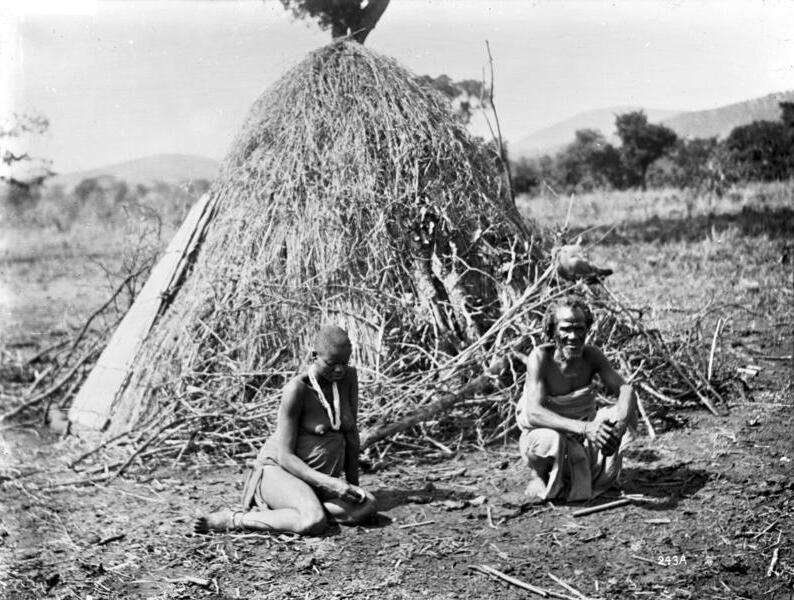
Bundesarchiv Bild 105-DOA0243, Deutsch-Ostafrika, Einheimische aus Urambi

According to oral tradition, the Nyamwezi are thought to have settled in west central Tanzania (their present location) some time in the 17th century. The earliest evidence comes from the Galahansa, and confirms their presence there in the late 17th century. They were once fishermen and nomadic farmers due to the poor quality of soil in the area. Their travels made them professional traders.

By 1800 they were taking caravans to the coast to trade in Katanga copper, wax, salt, ivory, and cattle herding slaves from Rwanda especially Tutsi slaves from . Arab and Indian slave and ivory traders reached the Nyamwezi by 1825. They also started to acquire guns, and establish regular armies, with intra-tribal wars and some conflicts with Arabs on the coast throughout the 19th century. They could be considered an acquisitive society, often accused of thinking of nothing but how to earn money.

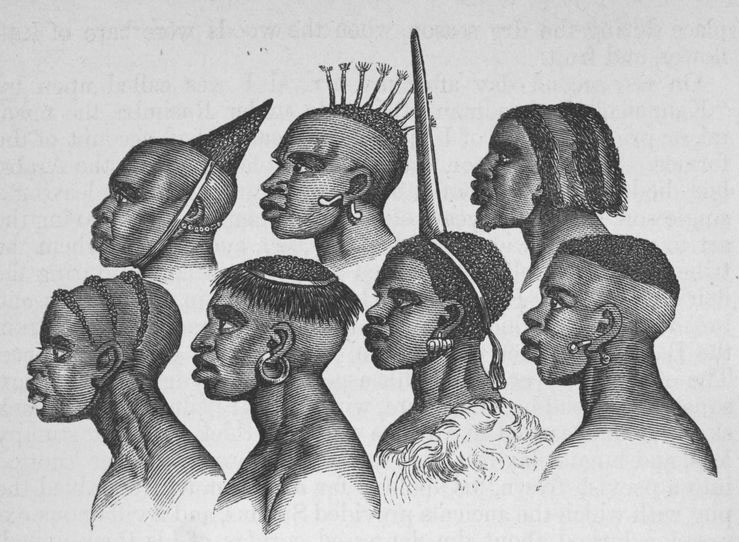
Wanyamwezi hairstyles, circa 1860

The Nyamwezi had long been a settled agricultural and cattle-owning people, arriving on the western plateau in the 16th century, and originally living in a mosaic of small and independent chiefdoms slowly carved out by ruling dynasties. According to a Catholic missionary, these may have numbered over 150, each with its own councilors, elders, and court slaves. In the 19th century, they were already recognized as large slave-owners and were famous for their herds. While cattle were important, their care was not part of tribal life. The Nyamwezi often hired professional herdsmen, the immigrant Tutsi, to care for their cattle herds.

=== 19th century ===
In the early 1800s, there were a number of Nyamwezi kingdoms, such as Unyanyembe, Ulyankhulu and Urambo. Unyanyembe was perhaps the most powerful, since it controlled the trading city of Tabora, and had close connections with the Arabs of Zanzibar, through the Arab community of Tabora. When Mnywasele inherited the throne of Unyanyembe in 1858, the Arabs helped him expel his rival Mkasiwa, who went into exile in Ulyankhulu. When Mnywasele later tried to increase his control over the Unyanyembe trading community, those allied with Mkasiwa, which led to a greater conflict between Unyanyembe and Ulyankhulu in 1860. The result of the conflict was that Mkasiwa gained the throne of Unyanyembe. In 1871 Unyanyembe was involved in another war, this time against Urambo, which at this time was ruled by the slaver and ivory trader known as Mirambo. 1873 the Urambo forces blockaded the ivory trade from Tabora resulting in the price of ivory rising globally. The war lasted until Mirambo's death in 1884.

In the 19th century, settlements were described as typically large, compact, and fortified for defense with strong wooden stockades, often in high inaccessible rocky places. When the Germans finally imposed peace, the population did not immediately disperse, but slowly, over a fifty-year period, the modern pattern of scattered settlements emerged.

German colonialists controlling Tanzania from the late 19th century (calling it German East Africa), found the Nyamwezi heavily involved in trade relations with the Arabs and the island of Zanzibar, dominating as traders and porters since 1850. (While Iliffe lists a likely 100,000 people traveling to and from the coast, Abrahams lists a possible 200,000 using many of the side 'roads', some making the trip as many as 20 times.) Despite the Nyamwezi's outside contacts, Nyamwezi colonies were remarkably resistant to foreign culture. Nyamwezi colonies outside the Unyamwezi long remained culturally distinct. In Unyamwezi itself, differing lifestyles were either absorbed into the existing order, similar to the Ngoni becoming just another chiefdom, or became isolated like the Arabs of Tabora. But for all their poor relationships with the coast and their conservatism, being able to travel was considered a valuable and manly attribute.

Many trade routes crossed Unyamwezi, and the Nyamwezi had access to ivory and slaves, stretching from the coast to the inland, as far as the Congo. The western Nyamwezi arrived at the coast with ivory around 1800, and coastal traders soon followed this up by finally entering Unyamwezi and reaching Ujiji by 1831. A kind of California Gold Rush took place for the ivory of the Congo's Maniema to the west of Lake Tanganyika. With their deep involvement in commerce, the Nyamwezi welcomed traders. The most hospitable chiefdom was Unyanyembe, where Arab traders established the nexus of Tabora to the Lake district beyond.

Conflicts between chiefs and Arab traders lasted through the last half of the 19th century. Chiefs such as Isike and Mirambo, no longer being purely ritual, had found that the arrival of firearms enabled them to create standing armies and a new state organization. It was firearms and trade that transformed the region, for trade generated the wealth needed to obtain firearms. Chiefs were normally ritual figures who had no very rigid rules of succession. They lived very restricted lives, with the most significant duties being carried out by headmen. They were strangled when they became seriously ill (as probably happened to Mirambo while dying of cancer), for the well being of the state and its continuation was identified with chief and his subordinate administrators. A hierarchy of territorial offices came into being. There were sub-chiefs, assistant chiefs, headmen elders, ritual officials, etc., as each dynasty seized power from another. Greater Nyamwezi had become a war zone.

By 1890 the Germans advanced further towards Tabora the western part of Tanganyika. It is located in the interior of Nyamwezi land. There, they met stiff resistance from Isike the Unyanyembe hereditary ruler. Isike was the only leader in Nyamweziland who was prepared to defend his country to the last drop of blood.

According to European intelligence and correspondence information provided by missionaries and explorers, Isike was on top the German list of serious opponents of the Europeans. With the coming of the Germans Isike was going to be alone—his Arab allies caved in, they abandoned the long relationship they had from the time of Isike's father Mkasiwa. The Arabs recognised and acknowledged the European military power they sided with them in the war against Isike.

Isike was a committed ruler who dedicated his life to longevity of his Nyanyembe state. He was attentive on matters of state governance. A man of few words. In communication with people he listened more than talking.

Isike was prudent in his dealings with all foreigners. His centrist view endeavoured to strike the middle way to balance the triangular relationship in the caravan trade. The triangular power relations between 1. local rulers, 2. Arab-Indians and 3. Europeans. His awareness and knowledge of the power workings of the three sides of the triangle sustained his authority.

In anticipation of foreign invasions Isike constructed a fortress around the Nyanyembe royal courts in Itetemia. It was a purpose built defence stronghold to keep invaders at bay. Built with thick walls built with stones and mud mortar, strengthened with fire. The walls were approximately three feet in width and ten feet in height. At the top of the walls holes were curved strategically designed for ruga-ruga snipers to place weapons in defence of the fortress base.

Unlike Isike's contemporaries Mirambo and Nyungu-ya-Mawe (Isike's cousin) who participated in the forefront of the battles lines leading their vicious ruga-ruga armies Isike chose to control his ruga-ruga forces from his command centre inside the fortress. He never complied with German demands or invitation to attend supposedly peace talks. Instead, he sent envoys only. He refused to come out of his fortress to personally negotiate with the invaders.

The German's first attempt to pacify Isike failed dismally in 1890. Their small army and weak military equipment was not up to the task. Isike stuck to his tactic of barricading himself in his fortress.

The German authority appointed Lieutenant Tom von Prince specifically to challenge and crash Isike's resistance by any means necessary. This time the Germans were better prepared with the additional reinforcement including the local ruga-ruga deserters who were lured with handsome rewards to work for the Germans as mercenaries. Lieutenant Tom von Prince Military was equipped with better weapons.

He also forged a coalition of the willing deserters, the skilled and experienced Arab militia with the support of princess Nyanso (Isike's rival cousin), and Ruga-ruga from other complying Nyamwezi rulers. The Ruga-ruga mercenaries and Arab militia puppets not only strengthened the German's army personnel in size, they also volunteered all vital intelligence that could undermine Isike's defence strategies.

In 1891 the Germans learnt a bitter lesson when they lost half their troops in Kalenga. Their military was annihilated when they attacked the Hehe ruler Mkwawa—Isike's son-in-law and a staunch ally. The Germans knew the two leaders conspired keeping in close contact and sharing intelligence in their bid to wade off foreign invasion.

Prior to 1893, the Germans launched two major unsuccessful attacks as attempt to defeat Isike and followed with intermittent multiple skirmishes. The Germans third ferocious offensive was decisive big blow. The German military; was able to break into Isike's stronghold. Realising imminent defeat, instead of surrendering to be captured alive by the victors Isike took his life in a suicide. He ignited the remaining gunpowder kegs stocked in the armoury where he barricaded himself with willing relatives and wives. He did not want to live an undignified miserable life under foreign occupiers.

Before Isike's defeat in 1891 Nyanso was installed as the German's allied ruler of Unyanyembe. Isike's death in 1893 cemented German's victory against him. This occurrence sealed the fate of the Nyamwezi dominance of the central caravan trade route. The Germans freely exalted their authority in Unyamwezi lands and subsequently Tanganyika. The German strategy to form a collaborative strong coalition of Isike's enemies, paid off. Otherwise, it would have been a strenuous task. It would have taken the Germans longer to defeat Isike's resolve. Only Isike's brother Swetu openly continued to resist in the periphery.

When Isike's Itetemia fortress fell in the German's hands, his brother Swetu retreated into the miyombo forest terrain with the remaining faithful ruga-ruga platoons. Swetu launched sporadic guerrilla attacks against the German invaders for about two years. However, Swetu's guerrilla tactics were not as organized as Mkwawa's. The German's military effort focused on Mkwawa after the conquest of Unyamwezi.

Unyamwezi was "pacified" by the Germans in 1893; only Chief Isike around Tabora giving any serious opposition. The Germans adopted a form of indirect rule in the region with chiefs becoming the administrative agents of the central government, receiving account books as a formal mark of recognition. Over time, the chiefs were expected to keep order and collect taxes. Where earlier officers welcomed their collaboration, later officers became suspicious of it, even deliberately dismantling a chiefdom.

As late as 1906, Karl Weule, a German ethnolonogist had the following to say; "Even European caravans had their porters expect to receive food and drink from native villages they passed through"

After the Germans were removed from Tabora during World War I, the British took over in 1919 and ruled until the Tanzanian independence of 1961. To combat sleeping sickness, many people were moved into new villages free from the disease.

== Social organisation ==
Historically, villages were normally not kinship units and people found their relatives spread over wide areas. Spouses generally came from outside the Tembes and sons commonly moved away from their father's homestead. The core members of a "domestic group" consisted of the husband, his wife or wives, and any children who still lived with them. Sometimes relatives, such as a mother, younger unmarried brothers or sisters, and their children could be found together. The sexes usually ate separately. In general men did the heavy work, while women did the recurring tasks and much of the everyday agricultural work.

Ideally every adult person should be married, and every married woman should have her own household and bring her own household utensils. The husband is said to technically own his wife's hut, fields, and most of the household's food, but a wise husband usually listened to the wife's advice. There was little ranking between co-wives, although seniority in terms of who was first married was at times recognized. Jealously and sorcery were common, much depending on how well co-wives got along. Unlike the Wagogo, divorce was common, a large majority of persons experiencing al least one divorce by the time they were fifty years of age, which included the return of bridewealth minus the number and sex of the children born. Divorce was most often accomplished by the separation of either party. Chiefdom courts found certain reasons to automatically justify divorce: a woman's desertion, being struck by a wife, the wife's adultery, sexual refusal of the wife, and having an abortion, were all adequate reasons. Grounds for a husband to claim divorce were failure of the wife to carry out household duties, visiting a doctor without permission, and possible infertility. A wife could divorce if the husband deserted for a period of time without supporting her; if the husband seriously injured her by, for example, breaking a limb, but not simply beating her; the husband's impotence or perversions; or if her husband generally failed to maintain her and her children properly. A husband's adultery would not be one of the grounds.

It was customary for the younger brother of her former husband to inherit a widow (a kind of "widows and orphans" security system), although it was not done against her will. Among some, inheritance of a widow by her husband's sister's son was particularly favored.

It had always been part or the Nyamwezi system for the chief to receive tribute, bring success and prosperity to the people, and play an active role in ceremonies. All land was said to have belonged to the chief and he had the right to expel witches and undesirables; abuse was checked by the general need to maintain a large population; and while no one had the right to sell land in a chiefdom, the people had considerable security in their rights to the land. Permission to clear land was not needed, but care was taken so as not to conflict with others in the area. If there was a shortage of land in an area to be inherited, a headman could insist upon other holdings. Water was free to all.

The Nyamwezi were highly religious with ntemi as their ritual, religious, leader and priest.

== Economic organisation ==
Elephant hunters have historically been one of the most prestigious occupations among the Nyamwezi, since the elephant hunters could get very rich from ivory trade. The elephant hunters were organised in a guild, which only accepted those who could pass the apprenticeship and the tests that were associated with it. Hunting had a wide variety of forms. Guild members often used lethal poison, and when they used it, in a German sergeant's words, "it worked slowly but surely."

The guildmembers believed they possessed powerful hunting medicine acquired through rigorous apprenticeships, tracking game in all types of terrain and moving swiftly and silently through thorny underbrush. The elephant hunting led to a decrease in elephant population, which combined with the increased trade in slaves, led to large changes in the social and economic conditions.

Nyamwezi staple food has historically been ugali, a porridge made from hominy and served with meat and vegetables. Beer made from fermented corn, sorghum, or millet was also common. Goats were used for ancestor sacrifices, but the economic value of goats and sheep lay in their meat and skins. By tradition five goats or sheep equated one bull; two bulls were worth one cow. Their year is divided into two seasons, wet and dry, with considerable variation depending on time and place.

In addition to agriculture, crafts were a part-time occupation and were not hereditary. Regionally traded products of importance were drums, ladles, stools, storage boxes for grain, and snuffboxes of horn. Iron and cloth were very important in regional networks, but the cloth industry in particular was ailing in 1857 because of severe competition from India, and over the next sixty years almost disappeared. Ironwork came from localized settlements whose products were then traded over wide areas: bows, arrows, spears, the payment of fines, and the extremely valuable hoes for bridewealth were all produced with considerable ritual by the smiths.

=== Slavery ===
Slavery was important and chiefs and other government officials owned the largest number, sometimes well over a thousand, for as porters became more and more important, and since many men were traveling, labor for cultivation became increasingly scarce and slaves were needed more and more. Slaves remaining in the local area seem to have had a life easier and more secure than those sent to the coast. Domestic slaves often lived and ate with their owners, were allowed to work on their own, and could possess their own slaves and livestock; loyal slaves could even be given part of a chiefdom, and it was not unusual for slaves to acquire positions of great influence and power.

Even though slave trading and raiding outside of Unyamwezi was considerable, some people became slaves as a result of debt. Before the 19th century, slavery was tolerated but looked down upon by the Nyamwezi. During the social and economic changes of the 19th century, the attitude changed, and the slave trade increased steadily. The ivory trade greatly increased the slave trade, although it had long been important in intra- and inter-regional trade. As with cattle, slaves were also needed and wanted for their prestige value, for men could gain influence and social connections, they could even make marriage payments with them. The slave was seldom used just to carry ivory. Ivory porters should be viewed as free and voluntary labor, although it is true that they were at times financially abused by their chiefs, but later these people were defeated by Arabs.

== Demographics ==
With the establishment of German East Africa in the 19th century, Moravian Church missionaries arrived in the Lake Malawi region of Tanganyika. Today, the Moravian Church In Western Tanzania (MCWT) has about 80,000 Nyamwezi adherents and many continue to evangelize among the Sukuma people.

About 926,000 Nyamwezi speak a language of the Bantu family, classified as the Sukuma–Nyamwezi group of Bantu.

The Nyamwezi are predominantly subsistence farmers and cattle herders.

== Culture ==
Most follow a traditional religion, despite conversion attempts by Islam and Christianity. They believe in a powerful god called Likube (High God), Limatunda (Creator), Limi (the Sun) and Liwelolo (the Universe), but ancestor worship is a more frequent daily practice. Offerings of sheep or goats are made to ancestors, and the help of Likube is invoked beforehand. Spirits also play an active role in Nyamwezi religious life, with mfumu, witchdoctors, or diviners, playing the role of counselor and medical practitioner. Bulogi (witchcraft) is a powerful force in Nyamwezi culture. The Baswezi society recruits people possessed by the Swezi spirit.

Many Nyamwezi converted to Sunni Islam during the 19th century and Islam even influenced the fashion of those that didn't convert. During the same century, other Nyamwezi converted to Protestant Christianity via the work of the Moravian Church established in the region. Even with conversion, both the Christian and especially the Muslim Nyamwezi retained much of their traditional customs and beliefs.

== Notable Nyamwezi ==
=== Royal figures ===
- Mirambo, Tribal King
- Msiri, Tribal ruler

=== Politicians ===
- Hamisi Kigwangalla - CCM
- Margaret Simwanza Sitta - CCM

=== Statespeople ===
- Samuel Sitta, Former National Assembly Speaker
