= Mirambo =

King of the Nyamwezi (1860s)

Mirambo (Mtyela Kasanda)
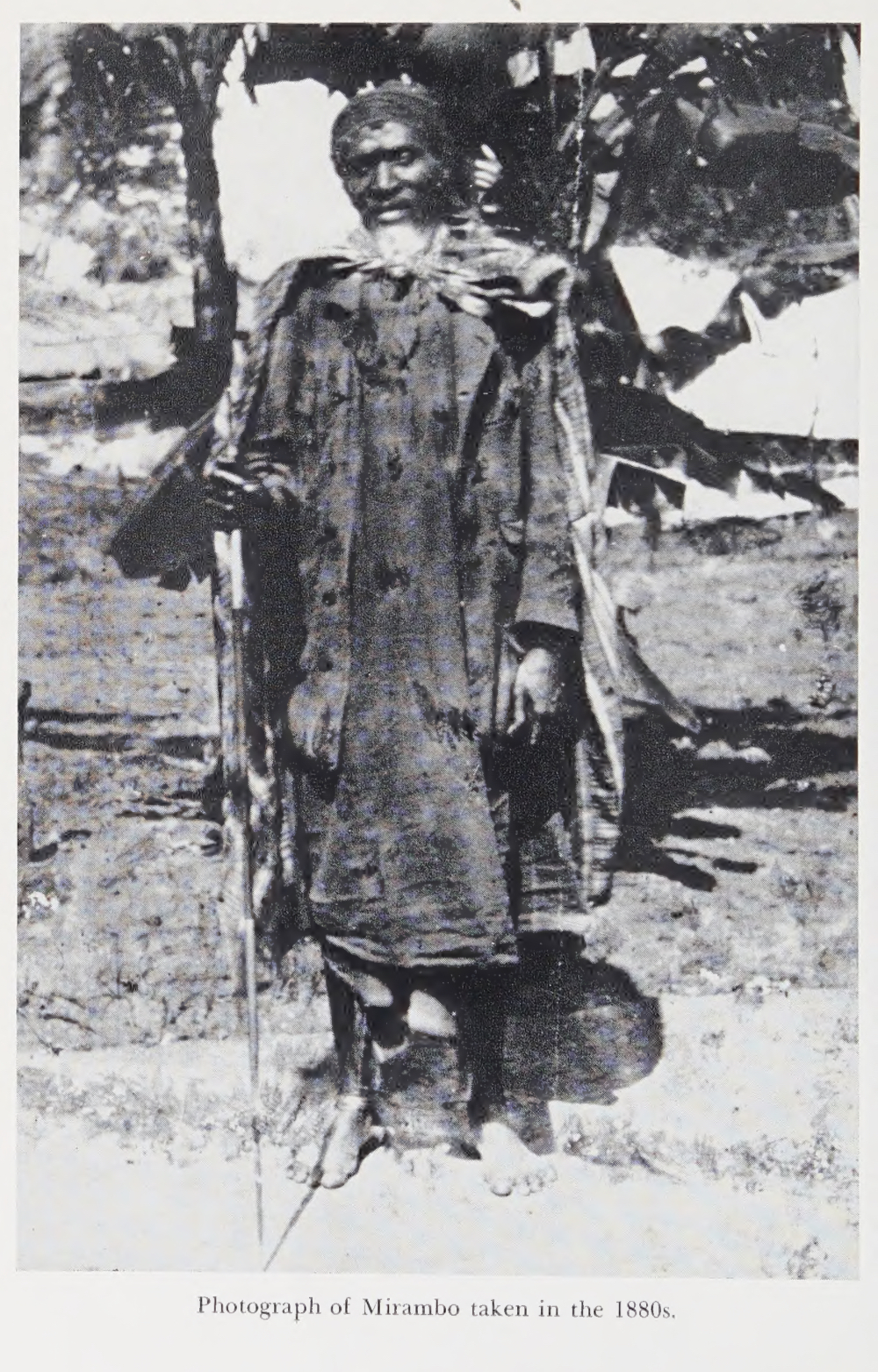
- Photograph of Mirambo in c. 1880
- Reign: 1860–1884
- Born: c. 1840
- Died: 1884

Mtyela Kasanda (c. 1840–1884), better known as King Mirambo, was a Nyamwezi king, from 1860 to 1884. He created the largest state by area in 19th-century East Africa in present-day Urambo district in Tabora Region of Tanzania. Urambo district is named after him. He also built a capital for his territory at Iselemagazi.

Mirambo started out as a trader and the son of a minor chief. He owned trade caravans traveling from the Great Lakes region in western Tanzania to the coast, mostly dealing in ivory and slaves. Through trade with Europeans he acquired firearms and money, and organised armies consisting mostly of teenage orphans. With his newly gained power, he toppled the traditional monarchy of the kingdom of Urambo, and installed himself as ntemi (king). The Nyamwezi aristocracy was appalled when someone who was not royalty took over the religiously ceremonial office of ntemi. Other sources assert that Mirambo was the son of the ruler of Uyowa. His coming to power there was a contravention of the succession being matrilineal.

Mirambo was based in an area with tsetse fly infestations, which meant that transport of goods was almost completely by people rather than with the aid of animals. Mirambo used both warfare and diplomacy to expand his territory and followers. He began building connections through the caravan business, working as an agent for his father.

Mirambo's success can be traced in part to his associations with the Watuta, a group of Ngoni people who were connected with Zwangendaba. With ongoing wars in southern Africa as Shaka had expanded Zulu power many people had fled north, this particular group settling near Bukune. Mirambo was closely associated with the Watuta's leader Mpangalala. It seems that it was from Mpangalala that Mirambo learned about the age-grade military system of organization found in southern Africa, and this led Mirambo to implement a similar system called the rugaruga. By the early 1880s this military organization had about 10,000 members.

The 1860s saw Mirambo extend his domains westward and conquer several of the Nyamwezi chiefdoms located to the west of his original domains with his growing rugaruga force. At times chiefdoms voluntarily joined his growing domain, being allowed to stay in power as long as they paid tribute and contributed forces to Mirambo's growing power. Notes

Apart from the Nyamwezi aristocracy, Mirambo also was an enemy of the trading community of Tabora in the kingdom of Unyanyembe. Many of the inhabitants of Tabora were Arab traders, and rivals of Mirambo for the control of the trade across Unyamwezi. These Arabs had powerful allies in Zanzibar on the coast. For most of his time as mtemi, Mirambo fought wars against his enemies. By the time of his death, he had united most of northern Unyamwezi in an alliance under his leadership, but he never managed to conquer Tabora. In the 1870s, he allied himself closely with Philippe Broyon, a Swiss merchant operating in the region. He also welcomed missionaries such as John Morton of the Church Missionary Society and Ebenezer Southon of the London Missionary Society to his kingdom. These missionaries viewed Mirambo as building a stable state in interior east Africa and convinced John Kirk, the British consul at Zanzibar, to shift his support in the interior wars from the Kingdom of Unyanyembe to Mirambo.

He was notable for opposing the Arab allies of Henry Morton Stanley. Stanley described Mirambo "the African as Bonaparte" for his military talents.

Near the end of his life he grew ill, and died at the age 44. It has been suggested that he was strangled to death, since an old Nyamwezi custom was to strangle their mtemi when they became unfit to rule.
