= Kimbu language =

Language

Kimbu
- Kikimbu
- Native to: Tanzania
- Ethnicity: Kimbu
- Native speakers: (78,000 cited 1987)
- Language family: Niger–Congo?: Atlantic–Congo; Volta-Congo; Benue–Congo; Bantoid; Bantu; Northeast Bantu; Takama; Nyamwezic; Kimbu

Language codes
- ISO 639-3: kiv
- Glottolog: kimb1242
- Guthrie code: F.24

Kimbu is a Bantu language of Tanzania. In 1992, use of Kimbu was declining but still in regular use in certain contexts. As of 2018, most children of Kimbu speakers learn Swahili as a first language, and do not learn Kimbu well.
