= Unyanyembe =

- City
- Location of Unyanyembe
- Coordinates: 3°36′S 33°45′E
- Country: Tanzania

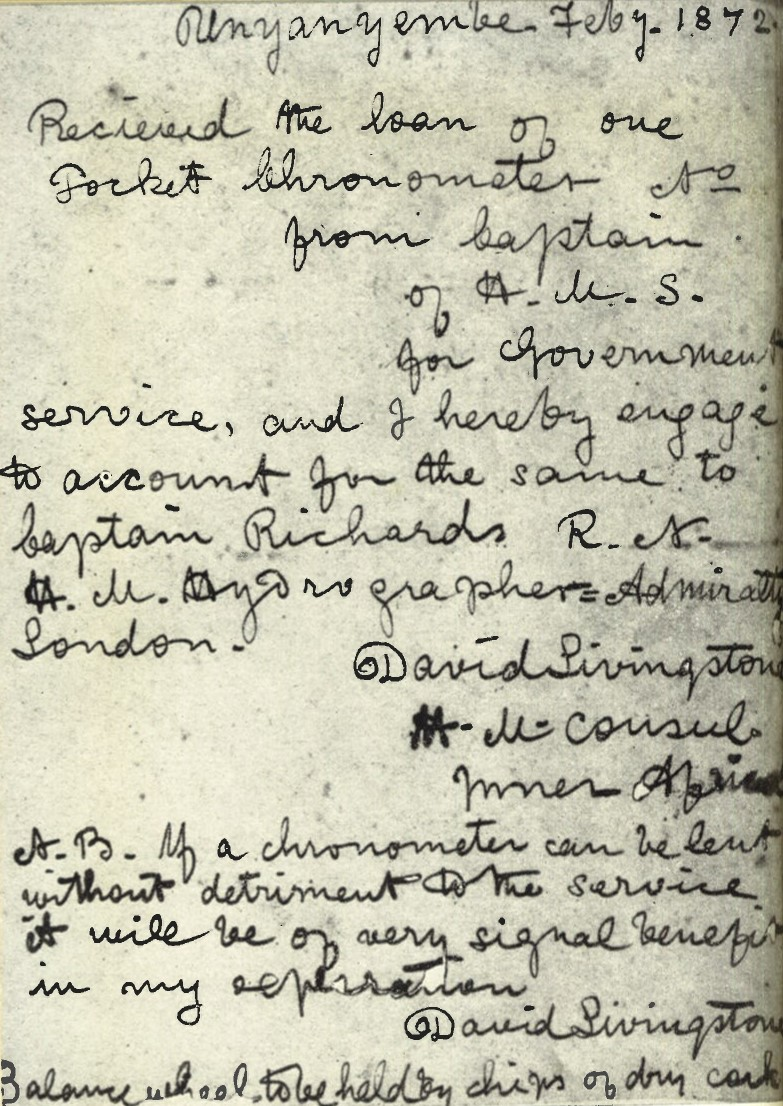
Pocket chronometer loan receipt by David Livingstone, Consul Inner Africa, Unyanyembe, February 1872. Zanzibar Museum.

Unyanyembe is a town in Tanzania (formerly German East Africa) near Mwadui Airport in Shinyanga Region. It was one of the locations visited by Henry Morton Stanley during his search for Dr Livingstone. In the 19th-century it was the headquarters of a kingdom that controlled Tabora as well as other areas. (David Livingstone was there in 1872, and borrowed a pocket chronometer, witness the document at the right.)

== Kingdom of Unyanyembe ==
Unyanyembe was a 19th-century kingdom where the main ethnic group was known as the Nyamwezi, although many other ethnic groups were present as well.

Ifundikila (reigned 1840–1858) was a king of Unyanyembe who oversaw major cooperation with a large Arab-Swahili commercial class in his kingdom. The two main bases of this population were Tabora and Kwihara. According to descriptions left by Sir Richard Burton this population had large gardens, large numbers of slaves and concubines, and in some cases controlled private armies sometimes numbering up to 300 people.

One of the most prominent Arabs, Mohammad ibn Juma, married one of Ifundikila's daughters. However it needs to be kept in mind that the Arabs and Swahili's were a foreign commercial class, they did not exercise political control in the kingdom.

The next king of Unyanyembe was Mnywasela. He was able to come to power in large part due to support of the Swahilis and Arabs. He expelled his main rival for the throne, Mkasiwa from the kingdom. After a few years the people of Unyanyembe tried of Mnywasela's rule, and a faction worked to return Mkasiwa from his exile in the Kingdom of Ulyankhulu. 1860 saw this struggle escalate to the point that Mnywasela was driven from power and Mkasiwa made the new ruler. The next four years saw persistent fighting as Mnywasela tried to regain power, but Mksaiwa was able to retain his power. In 1875 Mkasiwa was succeeded as king by Isike.

From 1871 to 1884 Unyanyembe was involved in a war with Urambo. This was fought because Urambo's ruler, Mirambo, had extended his power to control the main routes of trade between Unyanyembe and the Swahili coast, and both the Arab-Swahili merchants and the Nyamwezi objected to his transit fees. During this war the Barghash the Sultan of Zanzibar sent a force of 3,000 to fight on the side of Unanyembe. Prior to the war he had also appointed a consul of Zanzibar to be based in Tabora.

Unyanyembe also had a large population of the Tutsi in the 19th century. Although they came primarily as herdsmen, many were recruited into the army for the war against Urambo

=== List of Sultans of Unyanembe ===
Names and dates taken from John Stewart's African States and Rulers.

- Fundakira, c. 1858–1860
- Msavila, c. 1860–1865
- Kiyungi, c. 1865–1876
- Isike, 1876–1893
- Mugalula (Queen), 1893
- Kutagamoto, 1894–1898
- Koswika, 1898

== See also ==
- Vicariate Apostolic of Unyanyembe
