= Konongo–Ruwila language =

Bantu language spoken in Tanzania

Konongo–Ruwila
- Region: Tanzania
- Native speakers: (51,000 Konongo cited 1987); 5,600 Ruwila (2012)
- Language family: Niger–Congo?: Atlantic–Congo; Volta-Congo; Benue–Congo; Bantoid; Southern Bantoid; Bantu; Northeast Bantu; Takama; Nyamwezic; Konongo–Ruwila
- Dialects: Konongo; Ruwila

Language codes
- ISO 639-3: Either: kcz – Konongo rwl – Ruwila
- Glottolog: kono1265

Konongo and Ruwila (or Rwira) constitute a Bantu language of central Tanzania that is closely related to Nyamwezi – close enough to sometimes be counted as a dialect of Nyamwezi. Ruwila was until recently quite poorly attested.
