= Sukuma language =

Bantu language

Sukuma
- Kɪsukuma/Kisukuma
- Region: Tanzania
- Ethnicity: Sukuma
- Native speakers: 8.1 million (2016)
- Language family: Niger–Congo?: Atlantic–Congo; Volta-Congo; Benue–Congo; Bantoid; Southern Bantoid; Bantu; Northeast Bantu; Takama; Nyamwezic; Sukuma
- Dialects: Gwe; Kiya

Language codes
- ISO 639-2: suk
- ISO 639-3: suk
- Glottolog: suku1261
- Guthrie code: F.21

Sukuma is a Bantu language of Tanzania, spoken in an area southeast of Lake Victoria between Mwanza, Shinyanga, and Lake Eyasi.

== Dialects ==
Dialects (KɪmunaSukuma in the west, GɪmunaNtuzu/GɪnaNtuzu in the northeast, and Jìnàkɪ̀ɪ̀yâ/JimunaKɪɪyâ in the southeast) are easily mutually intelligible. (Note: The prefixes kɪ-, gɪ-, ji- are dialectical variants.)

=== Language identity ===
It is reported that, although Sukuma is very similar to Nyamwezi, speakers themselves do not consider the two a single language.

== Phonology ==
There are seven vowel qualities, which occur long and short:

	Front	Central	Back
High	i iː		u uː
Near-high	ɪ ɪː		ʊ ʊː
Mid	e eː		o oː
Low		a aː	

/ɪ ʊ/, which are written ⟨ĩ ũ⟩, may be closer to [e o], and /e o/ may be closer to [ɛ ɔ].

Sukuma has gone through Dahl's Law (ɪdàtʊ́ 'three', from Proto-Bantu -tatʊ) and has voiceless nasal consonants.

		Bilabial		Labio- dental		Alveolar			Palatal		Velar			Glottal	
		plain	pren.	plain	pren.	plain	pren.	labial	plain	pren.	plain	pren.	labial	plain	labial
Nasal	voiced	m				n			ɲ		ŋ		ŋʷ		
Nasal	voiceless	m̥				n̥			ɲ̊		ŋ̊		ŋ̊ʷ		
Plosive	voiceless	p	ᵐp			t	ⁿt	tʷ	c	ᶮc	k	ᵑk	kʷ		
Plosive	voiced	b	ᵐb			d	ⁿd	dʷ	ɟ	ᶮɟ	ɡ	ᵑɡ	ɡʷ		
Fricative	voiceless	ɸ		f	ᶬf	s	ⁿs	sʷ	ʃ	ᶮʃ				h	hʷ
Fricative	voiced	β		v	ᶬv	z	ⁿz	zʷ							
Approximant						l			j				w		

It is not clear whether /c ɟ/ should better be considered as stops or affricates as /tʃ dʒ/ or whether they are even palatal.

Syllables are V or CV. There are four tones on short vowels: high, low, rising, and falling.

== Orthography ==
Its orthography uses Roman script without special letters, which resembles that used for Swahili, and has been used for Bible translations and in religious literature.

== Grammar ==
The following description is based on the JinaKɪɪya dialect. One of the characteristics of that dialect is that the noun-class prefixes subject to Dahl's Law have been levelled to voiced consonants and so they no longer alternate.

=== Noun concord ===
Sukuma noun-class prefixes are augmented by pre-prefixes a-, ɪ-, ʊ-, which are dropped in certain constructions. The noun classes and the agreement that they trigger (Note: Adjectival concord, possessive suffixes on nouns, subject and object suffixes on verbs, and the agreeing form of -mô 'one', -βɪ̀lɪ́ 'two', and 'this') are as follows, with attested forms in other dialects being added in parentheses:

(For compatibility, /j/ is transcribed ⟨y⟩.)

Class	Prefix	Example noun		Adj. conc.	Possessive	Subject	Object	'one/two X'	'this X'	Semantic field
1	ʊ-mu	mùùn̥ʊ̀	'person'	m-	o-	a-	m-	ʊ̀mô	ʊ̀yʊ̀	human
2	a-βaa-	βààn̥ʊ̀	'persons'	βa-	βa-	βa-	βa-	βaβɪlɪ	àβà	human
3	ʊ-m-	ntɪ̌	'tree'	m-	go-	gʊ-	lɪ-	gʊ̀mô	ʊ̀yʊ̀	trees, etc.
4	ɪ-mi-	mɪ̀tɪ̌	'trees'	mi-	ya-	i-	i-	ɪ̀βɪ̀lɪ́	ɪ̀yɪ̀	trees, etc.
5	ɪ-lɪ- (ɪ)	liisǒ	'eye'	ɪ-	lɪ-	lɪ-	lɪ-	lɪ̀mô	ɪ̀lɪ̀	body parts, food, common objs, (pl.) liquids
6	a-ma-	mɪ̀sǒ	'eyes'	ma-	a-	a-	ga-	àβɪ̀lɪ́	àyà	body parts, food, common objs, (pl.) liquids
7	ɪ-ɟi- (kɪ)	Jìsùgǔmà	'Kɪsukuma'	ɟi-	ɟa-	ɟi-	ɟi-	ɟı̀mô	ɪ̀ɟì	things, language, body parts, etc.
8	ɪ-ɟi- (sɪ)	ɟítáβò	'books'	ɟi-	ɟa-	ɟi-	i-	ɟìβɪ̀lɪ́	ɪ̀ɟı̀	things, language, body parts, etc.
9	ɪ-n-	nùúmbà	'house'	n-	ya-	i-	i-	yɪ̀mô	ɪ̀yɪ̀	common objects, animals, fruits, etc.
10	ɪ-n-	mbʊ̀lǐ	'goats'	n-	ɟa-	ɟi-	ɟi-	ɪ̀βɪ̀lɪ́	ɪ̀ɟì	common objects, animals, fruits, etc.
11	ʊ-lʊ-	lʊ̀gòyè	'rope'	lu-	lo-	lu-	lu-	lʊ̀mô	ʊ̀lʊ̀	common objects, body parts, etc.
12	a-ga- (ka)	gàɪǎ	'a little dog'	ga-	ga-	ga-	ga-	gàmô	àkà	diminutives (Note: Including insignificance, derogation, (sg.) manner of doing)
13	ʊ-dʊ- (tʊ)	dʊ̀ɪǎ	'little dogs'	dʊ-	do-	dʊ-	dʊ-	dʊ̀mô	ʊ̀tʊ̀	diminutives
14	ʊ-βʊ-	βʊ̀sààdǔ	'sickness'	βʊ-	βo-	βʊ-	βʊ-	βʊ̀mô	ʊ̀βʊ̀	abstractions, insects, etc.
15	ʊ-gʊ- (kʊ)	gʊ̀tʊ̌	'ear'	gʊ-	go-	gʊ-	gu-	gʊ̀mô	ʊ̀yʊ̀	body parts and infinitives
16	a-ha-	hààn̥ʊ̀	'place'	ha-	ha-	ha-	ho-	hàmô	àhà	location
17	a-gʊ- (kʊ)	gʊ̀gàbáádi	'on the cupboard'	gʊ-	ya-	gʊ-	ko-	?	ʊ̀kʊ̀	location
18	ʊ-mu-	mʊ̀gàbáádi	'inside the cupboard'	m-	ya-	mu-	mo-	?	ʊ̀mù	location

Many kin terms have a reduced form of the nominal prefixes, zero and βa-, called class 1a/2a, as in mààyʊ̂ 'mother', βàmààyʊ̂ 'mothers'. Concord is identical with other class-1/2 nouns.

Singular/plural pairs are 1/2, 5/6, 7/8, 9/10, and 12/13, and locative classes 16, 17, and 18 do not have plurals. Most others use class 6 for their plurals: 11/6, 14/6, 15/6, and also sometimes 7/6 and 12/6. There are also nouns that inflect as 11/4, 11/14, 14/10, and 15/8.

=== Verbal complex ===
Infinitive verbs have the form gʊ-object-ext-ROOT-ext-V-locative, where ext stands for any of various grammatical 'extensions', and -V is the final vowel. For example, with roots in bold and tone omitted,

gũ-n-tĩn-ĩl-a
'To cut for him/her'
gwĩ-tĩn-ĩl-a
'To cut for each other'

-ĩl is the applicative suffix, translated as 'for'. The reciprocal prefix ĩ has fused into the infinitive gũ.

gũ-fum-a-mo
'To get out there'

-mo is a locative 'inside', as in class 18 nominal concord.

Finite verbs have the form subject-TAM-ext-object-ROOT-ext-TAM-V. For example,

βa-lĩ-n-iiš-a
'They are feeding him/her'

The root iiš includes a fused causative suffix. Tense is marked by a prefix. The subject marker βa- shows that the subject is human plural, per the noun-concord table above.

o-dũ-saang-ile
'He found us'

Here tense is marked by a suffix.

βa-gĩ-gunaan-a
'They helped each other/themselves'

Here the prefix is fused tense and reciprocal ĩ.
