= Nyamwezi language =

Bantu language spoken in Tanzania

Nyamwezi
- KiNyamwezi
- Region: Tanzania
- Ethnicity: Nyamwezi
- Native speakers: (1.5 million cited 1987–2016)
- Language family: Niger–Congo?: Atlantic–Congo; Volta-Congo; Benue–Congo; Bantoid; Southern Bantoid; Bantu; Northeast Bantu; Takama; Nyamwezic; Nyamwezi

Language codes
- ISO 639-2: nym
- ISO 639-3: nym
- Glottolog: nyam1276
- Guthrie code: F.22

Nyamwezi is a major Bantu language of central Tanzania. It forms a dialect continuum with Sukuma, but is more distinct from it.

Konongo and Ruwila are sometimes considered dialects.

== Phonology ==
=== Consonants ===
| | | Bilabial | Labio- dental | Alveolar | Post- alveolar | Palatal | Velar | Glottal |
|---|---|---|---|---|---|---|---|---|
| Plosive | plain | p b | | t d | | ɟ | k ɡ | |
| Plosive | prenasal | ᵐb | | ⁿd | | ᶮɟ | ᵑɡ | |
| Affricate | plain | | | | c͡ʃ | | | |
| Affricate | prenasal | | | | ᶮc͡ʃ | | | |
| Fricative | plain | β | f v | s z | ʃ | | | h |
| Fricative | prenasal | | ᶬf ᶬv | ⁿs ⁿz | ᶮʃ | | | |
| Nasal | | m̥ m | | n̥ n | | ɲ̊ ɲ | ŋ̊ ŋ | |
| Approximant | | | | l | | j | w | |

- Prenasalized voiceless stops [ᵐp ⁿt] may also frequently occur, as a result of loan words.
- Nasal sounds /m ŋ/ may also occur as labialized [mʷ ŋʷ].

=== Vowels ===
| | Front | Central | Back |
|---|---|---|---|
| High | i iː | | u uː |
| High | ɪ ɪː | | ʊ ʊː |
| Mid | ɛ ɛː | | ɔ ɔː |
| Low | | a aː | |

=== Tones ===
Tones present in Nyamwezi are high /v́/, low /v̀/, and rising /v̌/.

== Sample text ==
Banhu bose bubyalagwa biyagalulile, n'ikujo haki zilenganelile. Banhu bose bina masala na wiganiki, hu kuyomba ihayilwe bitogwe giti bana ba mbyazi bumo.

All human beings are born free and equal in dignity and rights. They are endowed with reason and conscience and should act towards one another in a spirit of brotherhood.
