= Kimbu people =

Ethnic group from Mbeya Region of Tanzania

The Kimbu are a Bantu ethnolinguistic group from Chunya District of Mbeya Region, Tanzania. In 1987 the Kimbu population was estimated to number 78,000.
