= Okatana =

Okatana may refer to:

- Okatana, Namibia, a settlement and former Catholic mission station in northern Namibia
- Okatana Constituency, an electoral constituency in northern Namibia
- Okatana River, a river in northern Namibia
- Ōkatana, a slightly longer katana (Japanese sword)
