= Sanet Steenkamp =

Namibian educator and politician

The Honourable Sanet Steenkamp

Minister of Education, Innovation, Youth, Sport, Arts & Culture
- Incumbent
- Assumed office 22 March 2025
- President: Netumbo Nandi-Ndaitwah
- Prime Minister: Elijah Ngurare
- Preceded by: Anna Nghipondoka

Executive director for the Ministry of Education Arts and Culture

Personal details
- Born: October 29, 1972 (age 53) Karasburg, ǁKaras Region, Namibia
- Education: Rhodes University
- Profession: Educator and public administrator

Sanet Steenkamp (born 29 October 1972) is a Namibian educator and administrator, currently serving as Minister of Education, Innovation, Youth, Sports, Arts and Culture. She served as a Senior School Counselor in Oshana Region and as a Director of Education in Ohangwena Region. In 2015, she was appointed as the Executive Director of the Ministry of Education, Arts and Culture.

In 2025, Steenkamp was appointed as a Member of Parliament. On 22 March 2025, she was appointed as the Minister of Education, Innovation, Youth, Sports, Arts and Culture.
