= Moses Amweelo =

Namibian politician (1952–2025)

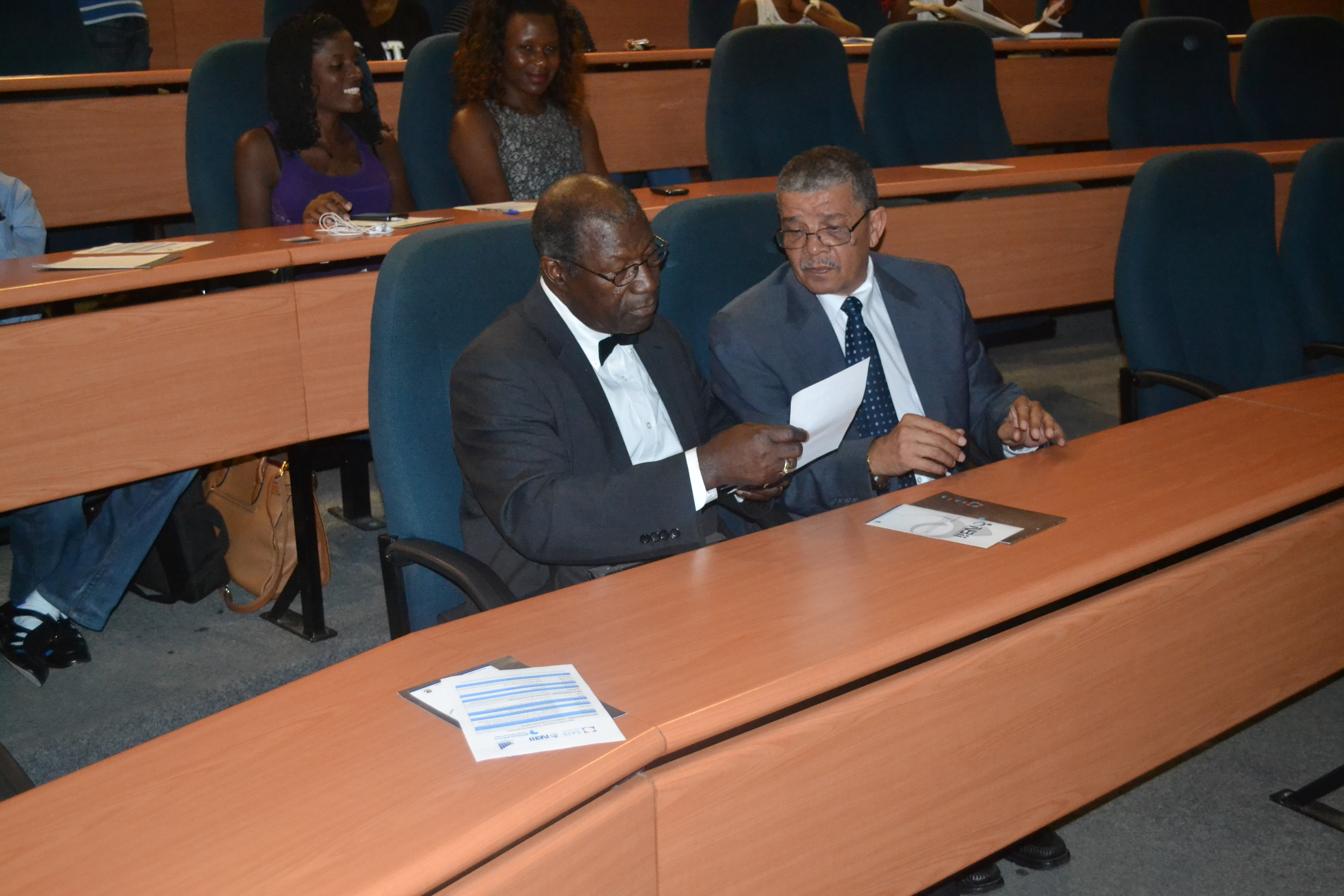
Moses Amweelo (left) and Steve Bezuidenhout

Moses Amweelo (25 May 1952 – 24 June 2025) was a Namibian politician who was a member of SWAPO. Amweelo became a member of the National Assembly in 2000 and was appointed Minister of Works, Transport and Communication. He served as minister until 2005, and as member of parliament until 2010. He was born in Okatana, Oshana Region. Amweelo died from cancer in Windhoek, on 24 June 2025, at the age of 73.
