= Kerry McNamara =

Namibian architect and anti-apartheid activist

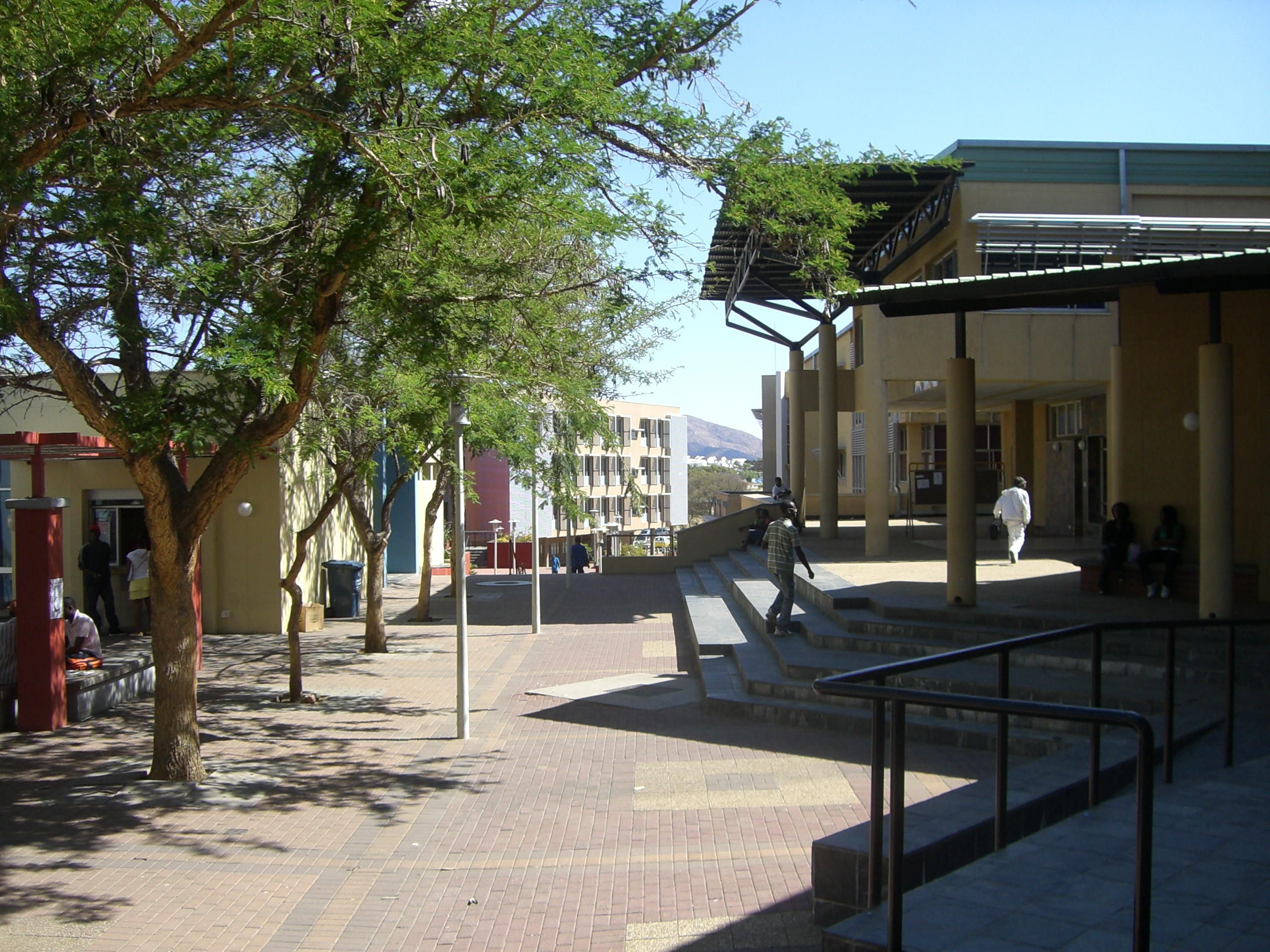
The Namibia University of Science and Technology Engineering campus in central Windhoek. All buildings on this campus were designed by Kerry McNamara Architects

Kerry McNamara (August 1940 in Kuruman – 16 January 2017 in Swakopmund) was a Namibian master architect and anti-Apartheid activist.

McNamara was born in August 1940 in Kuruman in the Northern Cape region of South Africa. In 1965 he graduated from University of Cape Town and moved to South-West Africa shortly thereafter. His first architectural project was the Technical High School in Ongwediva, later renamed to Ongwediva Training College. He founded Kerry McNamara and Associates in 1977, a company in 1988 renamed to Kerry McNamara Architects.

During his career McNamara he contributed to about 1,170 architectural designs, the best known of which were the Oshakati Open Market, the buildings at Namibia University of Science and Technology's Engineering campus, the display of the Hoba meteorite near Grootfontein, and the Rössing Foundation Adult Education Centre in Windhoek. He received recognition of his "innovative design of public places", and as a "standard setter on the Namibian architectural landscape". His colleague Natanael Araseb described him as a "visionary architect who practised urban design long before the concept had been coined". In 2010 he received the "Lifetime Achievement Award" from the Namibian Chamber of Architects.

Kerry McNamara was a known anti-apartheid activist. He was one of the driving forces behind the Namibia Peace Plan 435, a lobby group pushing for the implementation of UN Security Council Resolution 435 which called for the Independence of Namibia and the abolishment of White minority rule. The offices of The Namibian, a newspaper critical of the South African occupation of South-West Africa and supporting the then-oppressed SWAPO party, were leased from him, despite repeated firebombing and teargassing attacks by pro-apartheid militia. McNamara also partnered with Niko Bessinger, a black architect and known SWAPO leader, knowing that this partnership would cost him numerous contracts from the state and from private individuals.

McNamara died from cancer on 16 January 2017 in his retirement home in Swakopmund. He was married to Shelagh McNamara; the couple had three sons and a daughter.
