= Haikali =

Haikali is a surname. Notable people with the surname include:

- Hans Haikali
- Joel Haikali
