= Director of Education =

Director of Education may refer to:

- Director of Education (Hong Kong)
- Director of Education (Ontario)

== See also ==
- Director-General of Education, a title of agency heads in the Ministry of Education (Singapore)
