= Martin Andjaba =

Namibian diplomat and politician

The Honourable Martin Andjaba

Ambassador to Germany
- Incumbent
- Assumed office 2021
- President: Hage Geingob
- Prime Minister: Saara Kuugongelwa-Amadhila

Acting minister of Education, Arts and Culture
- In office 10 July 2019 – 20 March 2020
- President: Hage Geingob
- Prime Minister: Saara Kuugongelwa
- Preceded by: Katrina Hanse-Himarwa
- Succeeded by: Anna Nghipondoka

Minister of Presidential Affairs
- In office April 2018 – 9 July 2019
- President: Hage Geingob
- Prime Minister: Saara Kuugongelwa
- Preceded by: Immanuel Ngatjizeko

Ambassador to the United States of America
- In office 2010 – April 2018
- President: Hifikepunye Pohamba; Hage Geingob
- Prime Minister: Nahas Angula; Hage Geingob; Saara Kuugongelwa
- Preceded by: Patrick Nandago

Permanent representative to the United Nations
- In office 4 September 1996 – 2010
- President: Sam Nujoma; Hifikepunye Pohamba
- Prime Minister: Hage Geingob; Theo-Ben Gurirab; Nahas Angula

Personal details
- Born: 17 December 1957 (age 68) Onhokolo
- Party: SWAPO
- Profession: Diplomat, politician

Martin Andjaba (born 17 December 1957 in Onhokolo) is a Namibian diplomat and politician. He is Namibia's ambassador to Germany.

== Career ==
Andjaba served as the Namibian government's Chief of Protocol since 1990. He became Permanent representative to the United Nations on 4 September 1996. During Namibia's two-year tenure on the United Nations Security Council, Andjaba served as President of the Security Council in August 1999 and October 2000. He also led a UN delegation to East Timor.

In 2010 Andjaba was appointed ambassador to the United States of America. He held this position until April 2018 when he was appointed Minister of Presidential Affairs. In July 2019, with the next parliamentary election only months away, Andjaba became acting minister of Education, Arts and Culture, replacing Katrina Hanse-Himarwa. In March 2020, Anna Nghipondoka took over this portfolio. Andjaba was appointed ambassador to Germany at the end of that year.

== Recognition ==
Andjaba was conferred the Most Distinguished Order of Namibia: Second Class on Heroes' Day 2014.
