= Pohamba Shifeta =

Namibian politician

The Honourable Pohamba Shifeta MP
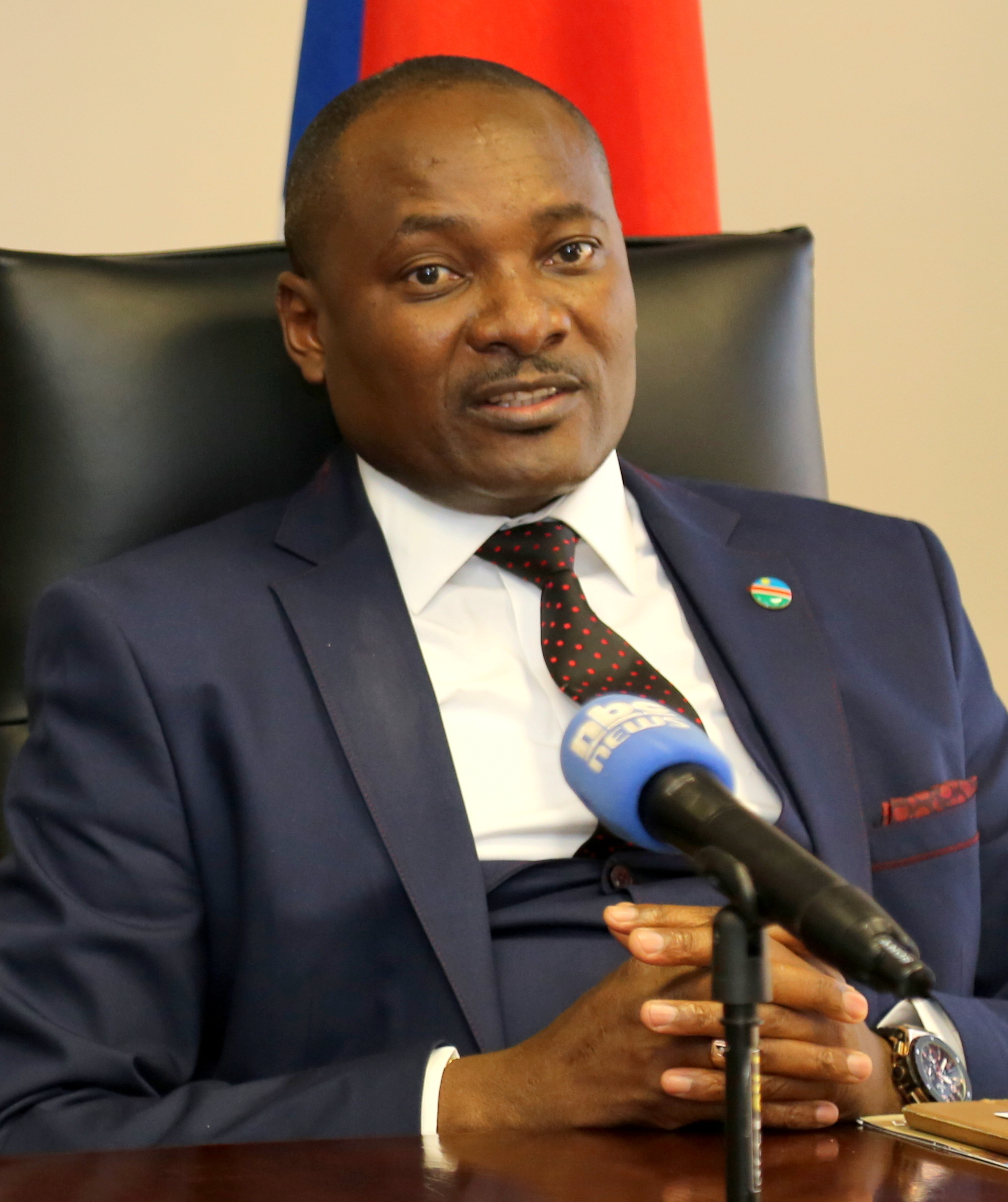
- Shifeta in 2016

Minister of Environment and Tourism
- In office 21 March 2015 – 21 March 2025
- Preceded by: Uahekua Herunga

Deputy Minister of Environment and Tourism
- In office 4 December 2012 – 21 March 2015
- Preceded by: Uahekua Herunga
- Succeeded by: Juliet Kavetuna

Deputy Minister of Youth, National Service, Sport and Culture
- In office 21 March 2005 – 4 December 2012
- Succeeded by: Juliet Kavetuna

Personal details
- Born: 27 March 1968 (age 58) Ongenga, Ohangwena Region
- Party: SWAPO
- Education: University of Namibia, University of South Africa
- Occupation: Politician
- Profession: Lawyer

Pohamba Penomwenyo Shifeta (born 27 March 1968) is a Namibian politician. He was Namibia's Minister of Environment and Tourism from March 2015 to 21 March 2025.

== Early life and education ==
Shifeta was born at Ongenga in the Ohangwena Region. He had been active in the SWAPO-ledNational Union of Namibian Workers and Namibia National Students Organisation since 1988. He earned a bachelor's degree in political science at the University of Namibia in 1996. He has also been involved in the SWAPO Party Youth League. Shifeta is an admitted full-time legal practitioner and completed a Bachelor of Laws (LLB) degree with the University of South Africa (Unisa).

== Political career ==
Shifeta was first elected to the National Assembly of Namibia in 2004 as a SWAPO candidate. He was appointed as Deputy Minister of Youth, National Service, Sport, and Culture in March 2005, and he retained his position after the 2009 general election. In a December 2012 cabinet reshuffle, after the fifth SWAPO congress, Shifeta was moved to the post of deputy Minister of Environment and Tourism, working under Uahekua Herunga.

In President Hage Geingob's cabinet, appointed in March 2015, Shifeta was promoted to Minister of Environment and Tourism.
