= Agnes Tjongarero =

Namibian politician

The Honourable Agnes Tjongarero MP

Minister of Sport, Youth and National Service
- In office 21 March 2020 – 21 March 2025
- Preceded by: Erastus Uutoni

Deputy Minister of Sport, Youth and National Service
- In office 2015 – 21 March 2020
- Succeeded by: Emma Kantema-Gaomas

Personal details
- Born: 17 May 1946 (age 79) Walvis Bay, South Africa (today Namibia)
- Party: SWAPO
- Occupation: Politician
- Profession: Nurse, midwife

Agnes Basilia Tjongarero (born 17 May 1946) is a Namibian politician.

Tjongarero was born on 17 May 1946 in Walvis Bay, South Africa (today Namibia). Between 1968 and 1975 she trained as nurse, midwife, nursing manager and nursing educator, and then worked as a lecturer at a nursing college until 1992.

Tjongarero also was active in various sport administration roles. She was president of the All Namibia Netball Association between 1993 and 1997 and vice chairperson of the Namibia Sports Commission between 2006 and 2009. She is the president of the Namibia National Olympic Committee since 1997.

Tjongarero is a member of SWAPO. She was appointed to the National Assembly in 2010 by president Hifikepunye Pohamba. In 2015 she was appointed deputy Minister of Sport, Youth and National Service. In March 2020, she was promoted to minister.
