= Willem Konjore =

Namibian clergy and politician (1945–2021)

The Honourable Reverend Willem Konjore

Minister of Youth, National Service, Sport and Culture
- In office March 2008 – March 2010
- President: Hifikepunye Pohamba
- Preceded by: John Mutorwa
- Succeeded by: Kazenambo Kazenambo

Minister of Environment and Tourism
- In office March 2005 – March 2008
- President: Hifikepunye Pohamba
- Preceded by: Philemon Malima
- Succeeded by: Netumbo Nandi-Ndaitwah

Personal details
- Born: 30 July 1945 Kais, South West Africa
- Died: 11 June 2021 (aged 75) Windhoek, Namibia
- Party: SWAPO
- Spouse: Elsie Anastasia Konjore
- Children: 9
- Occupation: Politician
- Profession: Clergy, teacher

Reverend Willem Konjore (30 July 1945—11 June 2021) was a Namibian politician. He was a member and a deputy speaker of the National Assembly of Namibia, and served in cabinet from 2005 to 2010.

== Early life and education ==
Konjore was born on 30 July 1945 in Kais, a small settlement in what today is the ǁKaras Region. He trained as a teacher from 1966 to 1967 at St Joseph's Teacher Training Centre in Döbra and studied theology in the Diocese of Keetmanshoop and Mariental from 1976 to 1979. From 1968 to 1990 he worked at several schools in southern Namibia, first as teacher in Tses, and later as principal and manager of the Ecumenical Community School in Koichas.

== Political career ==
A member of SWAPO, Konjore was a member of the National Assembly of Namibia beginning with the Constituent Assembly in 1989 and ending following the election of the 5th National Assembly in 2010. He served as deputy speaker of this body from 2000 to 2005.

He was appointed Minister of Environment and Tourism in 2005, and was moved to the Youth, National Service, Sport and Culture portfolio in 2008.

Konjore was married to Elsie Atanasia Konjore from Vaalgras. They had five children. His wife died in 2013. On Heroes' Day 2014 he was conferred the Most Brilliant Order of the Sun, Second Class. Willem Konjore died on 10 June 2021 in Windhoek.
