= Ministry of Works and Transport (Namibia) =

Government ministry of Namibia

The Ministry of Works and Transport is a government ministry of Namibia. It was established in 1990 as Ministry of Public Works, Transport and Communication and got its current name in 2008 when the communication portfolio was moved to the information ministry.

The head office is located in the MWT Head Office Building in Windhoek.

== Leadership ==
As of 2020 John Mutorwa was the minister until 2025. Veikko Nekundi was appointed as Minister of Works and Transport by Netumbo Nandi-Ndaitwah on 22 March 2025. Hans Haikali was appointed on 2 April 2026 as Deputy Minister of Works and Transport.

== Agencies ==
The Namibia Civil Aviation Authority (NCAA) and the Directorate of Aircraft Accident Investigations (DAAI) are part of the Ministry of Works and Transport.

== Ministers ==
All works and transport ministers in chronological order are:

| # | Picture | Name | (Birth–Death) | Party | Term start | Term end |
Minister of Public Works, Transport and Communication
| 1 | | Richard Kapelwa Kabajani | 1943–2007 | SWAPO | 1990 | 1992 |
| 2 | | Marco Hausiku | 1953–2021 | SWAPO | 1992 | 1995 |
| 3 | | Hampie Plichta | 1934–2001 | SWAPO | 1995 | 2000 |
| 4 | | Moses Amweelo | 1952–2025 | SWAPO | 2000 | 2005 |
| 5 | | Joel Kaapanda | 1945– | SWAPO | 2005 | 2008 |
Minister of Works and Transport
| 6 | | Helmut Angula | 1945 | SWAPO | 2008 | 2010 |
| 7 | | Erkki Nghimtina | 1948–2026 | SWAPO | 2010 | 2015 |
| 8 | | Alpheus ǃNaruseb | 1954– | SWAPO | 2015 | 2018 |
| 9 | | John Mutorwa | 1957– | SWAPO | 2018 | 2025 |
| 10 | | Veikko Nekundi | 1977- | SWAPO | 2025 | |
