= Oshakati East =

Electoral constituency in Oshana, Namibia

Coordinates: 17°47′S 15°41′E

Oshakati East constituency (red) in the Oshana Region

Oshakati East is an electoral constituency in the Oshana Region of Namibia. It comprises the eastern parts of the town of Oshakati. The constituency had 19,606 registered voters in 2020. Oshakati East covers an area of 187 km^{2} (72 sq mi). It had a population of 27,227 in 2011, up from 24,269 in 2001.

Oshakati East was created in 1998. Following a recommendation of the Second Delimitation Commission of Namibia, and in preparation of the 1998 general election, the old Oshakati Constituency was split into Oshakati West and Oshakati East. The Okatana River separates the two constituencies.

== Politics ==
Oshakati is traditionally a stronghold of the South West Africa People's Organization (SWAPO) party. In the 2004 regional election SWAPO candidate Lotto Kuushomwa received 6,697 of the 7,324 votes cast. Kuushomwa was reelected in the 2010 regional elections with 6,501 votes. He defeated challengers Epafras Nghinamundova of the Rally for Democracy and Progress (RDP, 276 votes), Agatus Antanga of the Democratic Turnhalle Alliance (DTA, 72 votes), Timoteus Kambishi of the Congress of Democrats (CoD, 34 votes) and Ndateelela Nakale of SWANU (16 votes). Councillor Kuushomwa (SWAPO) was again reelected in the 2015 regional elections. He won with 5,559 votes, far ahead of Daniel Andreas (DTA) with 241 votes and Natangwe Shiwayu (RDP) with 81 votes.

The SWAPO candidate also won the 2020 regional election, albeit by a much smaller margin. Abner Shikongo obtained 4,575 votes, followed by Simon Neshiko of the Independent Patriots for Change (IPC), an opposition party formed in August 2020, with 2,411 votes.
