= Erundu Combined School =

School in Namibia

Erundu Combined School formerly known as Erundu Secondary School is a formerly white-only school on Kwame Nkrumah Street in Oshakati, situated in the Oshana region in northern Namibia.

In 2010, it was considered one of the best schools in Namibia but has since lost this status. The school taught Fysal El Maralby, the 4th best learner in Namibia. This accomplishment made the community of the school of Erundu proud and well known in the country.

It was a junior secondary school until 2008, teaching grades 1 to 10. Then grades 11 and 12 were added, and the name was changed to "combined school". In August 2010, the school got a newly renovated and computer-equipped resource center which was named after Eddie Bezuidenhout, a benefactor of the school and the school inspector responsible for the Eheke Circuit.

The school currently needs funding from parents or financial institutions, to build more classrooms and fix broken equipment.

Basketball was once its most important sport, but this was greatly overshadowed by its rugby team which was largely funded by the players and outside sponsors.
