= Ehenye =

Ehenye is a village on the edge of the town, of Oshakati, Namibia. The village was formed in the 1950s by people who were forcefully removed from Erundu (as Oshakati was known by then) by the South African apartheid regime to pave way for the development of the town. The village has approximately 58 homestead and the population of 400 people, of which 45% of the population are elderly people over the age of 50. The village has a primary school known as Ehenye PS which was established in 1997, the school has 15 teachers, 470 students and covers grades 1–7. Since moving to Ehenye village, villagers has been living in peace and harmony until 1992, when the Oshakati town council approached them for the first time concerning their land.

== Relocation and compensation ==
Throughout the years the Oshakati town council has been forcing the villagers to abandon their land, to pave way for the development of the town. Villagers has urged that they will not leave their land, unless the Oshakati town council compensate them well, look for them places were they can get land to plough and transport them to the new places. The town council managed to force some elderly members to sell their land at lower prices than it is worth, while the majority of the villagers are still demanding fair compensation from the town council. Villagers have appointed a committee of young educated members of their society to deal with the matter and to ensure that they receive proper compensation which is worth of their land. The committee consist of Mr. Charles Amunime, Mrs. Tshalongo tya Nuuyoma, Mr. Antonius Amugongo and many other members. In 2007 the Oshakati town Mayor, by then Mr. Egerbrecht Atshipara announced plans of building more than 2200 houses at Ehenye village, which means that all Ehenye village residents have to relocate. Under his Leadership the Oshakati town council failed to gain control of the village.

According to residence of Ehenye village they had a meeting with permanent secretary to the Ministry of Regional and Local Government, Housing and Rural Development, by then Mr. Erastus Negonga to inform him of the land issues they are facing and the compensation been offered by the town council. Under the former Mayor Katrina Shimbulu, the town council went as far as digging water pipe lines in the village without informing the residents. In 2009 the town council accused the Ehenye residents of attacking construction trucks which belong to the Oshakati-based construction company Nexus, the trucks were apparently driving through the village from Ongwediva to the site where the new Oshakati open market was being constructed. According to the committee leader Charles Amunime the residents had to stop the construction because the compensation terms presented by the council were not fair and that villagers have presented the issue to LAC, so that they can intervene and negotiate for fair compensation. He also stated that the compensation terms presented by the town council Oshakati are based on the cabinet decision of 1996.

The Oshakati town council have failed to meet the villagers demands of N$100000 per hectare of land, instead they insist on offering the villagers N$5000, which the PS claim that it is an increase of N$4000 on the previous amount of N$1000 which was offered a few years ago by the town council, all this amount of money offered by the town council is seen by the villagers as peanuts and they think that they land is worth more than N$5000 per hectare. The villagers of Ehenye village have sent another written document with all their demands to the cabinet and the Oshakati town council, they hope that their needs and demands will be met. And that they receive a fair compensation for their land. The villagers have also stated that they can pave way for further development of the town, but only when they are fairly compensated.2013 Servicing of gravel roads Bitumen sewer as well as water reticulation as well as Construction of -+242 houses started under Oshakati based construction company Mavinga Construction cc and water engineering Africa.

Today, Ehenye is a suburb of Oshakati town with more than 1000 houses.
