= Kazenambo Kazenambo =

Namibian politician (1963–2021)

The Honourable Kazenambo Kazenambo

Minister of Youth, National Service, Sport and Culture
- In office 2010 – 4 December 2012
- President: Hifikepunye Pohamba
- Prime Minister: Nahas Angula
- Preceded by: Willem Konjore
- Succeeded by: Jerry Ekandjo

Deputy Minister of Local and Regional Government, Housing and Rural Development
- In office 2005–2010
- President: Hifikepunye Pohamba
- Prime Minister: Nahas Angula
- Succeeded by: Jerry Ekandjo

Personal details
- Born: 6 July 1963 Maun, Bechuanaland Protectorate (now Botswana)
- Died: 17 August 2021 (aged 58) Windhoek, Namibia

Kazenambo Kazenambo, commonly known as KK, (6 July 1963 – 17 August 2021) was a Namibian politician.

A member of SWAPO, Kazenambo was first elected to the 4th National Assembly of Namibia in 2005 and appointed deputy Minister of Local and Regional Government, Housing and Rural Development. In 2010 he was promoted to Minister of Youth, National Service, Sport and Culture and served until 2012. He was a member of SWAPO's politburo.

== Early life ==
Kazenambo was born in Maun, Bechuanaland Protectorate (now Botswana), the son of Namibian refugees. He joined SWAPO in 1979, at the age of 16. Five years later in 1984, he travelled to Angola, where he received military training. In 1986, he joined the People's Liberation Army of Namibia, SWAPO's military wing, as a combatant. He fought with SWAPO until 1989, when negotiations ended the Namibian War of Independence. Prior to independence, he also worked as a journalist for the Namibia Press Agency (NAMPA) and the Voice of Namibia radio program. A year later, Namibia became independent and he moved to Namibia, the land of his family, where he became a journalist for Namibia Today, the official mouthpiece of the SWAPO Party.

== Political career ==
Kazenambo joined government in 1992 and became an advisor to prime minister Hage Geingob in 1996. A longtime member of the SWAPO Party Youth League (SPYL), Kazenambo was a member of its central committee from 1991 to 2002.

Following the 2004 general election, president Pohamba appointed Kazenambo as the deputy Minister of Local and Regional Government, Housing and Rural Development behind John Pandeni. Prior to the 2009 elections, Kazenambo was placed 9th overall out of 72 spots on the SWAPO list for the National Assembly. Kazenambo was appointed Minister of Youth, National Service, Sport and Culture in 2010 and served in this position until a cabinet reshuffle on 4 December 2012. In 2014 he was appointed to SWAPO's politburo.

== Controversies ==
Kazenambo was known as a man of his words, never shy to offer his opinion. In January 2011, Windhoek police were called to separate Kazenambo and the manager of Hochland Park's Spar supermarket when the minister confronted the manager regarding mistreatment of black customers. Security personnel at the store habitually checked the bags of black shop patrons, on that day including minister Kazenambo, but not those of white shoppers. Police removed Kazenambo from the store after a heated exchange which included allegations of racism. The cabinet minister had a similar incident in August 2010 at the airport in Munich, Germany, where he was detained under the suspicion of travelling with a fake passport.

In November 2011, Kazenambo publicly accused journalist Jan Poolman of the Namibian Sun of "buffoonery of the highest order of a perverted mind" and of being a thief and added that "whites should not take reconciliation for granted [...] [w]e will grab farms if they push this matter. We will push the Constitution aside if they scratch too far. Mark my words, give us time ... if they continue, we'll also take some action to claim what is ours". The Namibian government was criticised for treating Kazenambo with kid gloves and not reprimanding him after the outburst.

Kazenambo was responding to an article written by Poolman that Kazenambo spent N$1.7 million instead of the budgeted N$1 million to send 65 delegates to collect the skulls of some of the victims of the Herero and Namaqua Genocide of 1904–1907 from Germany.

During an interview in February 2012 with The Namibian journalist Tileni Mongudhi, Kazenambo allegedly made a racist attack against his fellow ministers, calling them "stupid Owambos", and said that Ovambo people "are just like the Boers, worse because you are hungry and stupid". The interview apparently started on a cordial note until Mongudhi asked if Kazenambo was proudly acting "more of a Herero than a national representative" in relation to the delegation he led to Germany to retrieve Herero remains. Kazenambo then accused Mongudhi of being part of an "Owambo conspiracy" and seized his voice recorder. The recorder was then sent to another country to get its contents professionally erased before being returned to Mongudhi's lawyer.

== Private life ==
Kazenambo descended from a family affected by the Herero and Namaqua genocide and was lobbying for German reparation payments. He had three children. Kazenambo died from post-COVID-19 complications in August 2021. He was buried at Okapuka north of Windhoek next to his great-grandfather.
