= Ministry of Youth and Sport (Namibia) =

Former Namibian government department

The Ministry of Sport, Youth and National Service (MSYNS) was a department of the Namibian government. It was established as Ministry of Youth and Sport in 1991 when sport was split off from the Ministry of Education. The first minister of education, culture and sport was Nahas Angula, serving from independence in 1990. The first minister of youth and sport was Pendukeni Iivula-Ithana.

MSYNS appointed, directed, and took advice from, the Namibia Sports Commission.

The ministry was dissolved in 2000; The youth portfolio was discontinued, and sports was added to the Ministry of Basic Education. In 2005 it was reestablished as Ministry of Youth, National Service, Sport and Culture. Culture was again given back to the Ministry of Education in 2015, and the youth and sport ministry got its latest name. The ministry was again disestablished in 2025. The portfolio of national service was discontinued—Namibia never had a national service. Youth and sport were given to the education ministry. The current Minister of Education, Innovation, Youth, Sport, Arts and Culture is Sanet Steenkamp.

== Ministers ==
All youth and sport ministers in chronological order are:

#	Picture	Name	(Birth–Death)	Party	Term start	Term end
Minister of Education, Culture and Sport
1		Nahas Angula	1943–	SWAPO	1990	1991
Minister of Youth and Sport
2		Pendukeni Iivula-Ithana	1952–	SWAPO	1991	1996
3		Richard Kabajani	1943–2007	SWAPO	1996	2000
Minister of Basic Education, Culture and Sport
4		John Mutorwa	1957–	SWAPO	2000	2005
Minister of Youth, National Service, Sport and Culture
		John Mutorwa	1957–	SWAPO	2005	2008
5		Willem Konjore	1945–2021	SWAPO	2008	2010
6		Kazenambo Kazenambo	1963–2021	SWAPO	2010	2012
7		Jerry Ekandjo	1947–	SWAPO	2012	2015
Minister of Sport, Youth and National Service
		Jerry Ekandjo	1947–	SWAPO	2015	2018
8		Erastus Uutoni	1961–	SWAPO	2018	2020
9		Agnes Tjongarero	1946–	SWAPO	2020	2025
Minister of Education, Innovation, Youth, Sport, Arts and Culture
10		Sanet Steenkamp	1972–	SWAPO	2025	
