= Okatana, Namibia =

Okatana
- Nickname: Kapana
- Location in Namibia
- Coordinates: 17°44′25″S 15°42′31″E
- Country: Namibia
- Region: Ohangwena Region

Population (2019)
  - Total: 4,550
- Time zone: UTC+1 (South African Standard Time)
- Currency: Namibian dollar
- Languages: English, Afrikaans, German, Ovambo, local languages
- Religion: Roman Catholic

Okatana is a village in the Oshana Region in the north of Namibia in the Uukwambi tribal area. It is the centre of the Okatana Constituency.

Okatana is a former Catholic mission station. It is located on the Okatana River, just under six kilometres to the north of Oshakati.

The Okatana mission station was founded in 1932, near the border between Uukwambi and Oukwanyama, but just barely in Uukwambi.
