= Ministry of Education (Namibia) =

Namibian government department responsible for education

The Ministry of Education (MOE) renamed Ministry of Education, Innovation,Youth, Sports, Arts and Culture ( MEIYSAC) is a department of the Namibian government. Established at Namibian independence in 1990, the first Namibian education minister was Nahas Angula. The current education minister is Sanet Steenkamp, deputized by minister Dino Balloti.

== Portfolios ==
In 1990 the ministry was established as Ministry of Education, Culture, Youth and Sport. In 1991 the portfolios of youth and sport were split off, and a separate Ministry of Youth and Sport was created.

In 1995 the ministry was renamed Ministry of Basic Education and Culture. The responsibility for tertiary education was given to a new ministry, the Ministry of Higher Education and Vocational Education. This step was revoked in 2005, when the ministry was again renamed to Ministry of Education, and reinstated in 2015, when there again was a separate Ministry of Higher Education, and this ministry was named Ministry of Education, Arts and Culture.

In 2025 the ministry experienced its so far latest change when the Ministries of Sport, Youth and National Service and Higher Education, Training and Innovation were both dissolved, and the education ministry took over all their portfolios except national service and training, which were discontinued. The ministry is now named Ministry of Education, Innovation, Youth, Sport, Arts and Culture (MEIYSAC).

== Prime Ministers ==
All education ministers (excluding ministers of higher education) in chronological order are:

#	Picture	Name	(Birth–Death)	Party	Term start	Term end
Minister of Education, Culture, Youth and Sport
1		Nahas Angula	1943–	SWAPO	1990	1991
Minister of Basic Education and Culture
		Nahas Angula	1943–	SWAPO	1992	1995
Minister of Basic Education, Culture and Sport
2		John Mutorwa	1957–	SWAPO	1995	2005
Minister of Education
3		Nangolo Mbumba	1941–	SWAPO	2005	2010
4		Abraham Iyambo	1961–2013	SWAPO	2010	2013
5		David Namwandi	1954–	SWAPO	2013	2015
Minister of Education, Arts and Culture
6		Katrina Hanse-Himarwa	1967–	SWAPO	2015	2019
		Martin Andjaba (acting)	1957–	SWAPO	2019	2020
7		Anna Nghipondoka	1957–	SWAPO	2020	2025
Minister of Education, Innovation, Youth, Sport, Arts and Culture
8		Sanet Steenkamp	1972–	SWAPO	2025	
