= John Mutorwa =

Namibian politician (born 1957)

The Honourable John Mutorwa MP
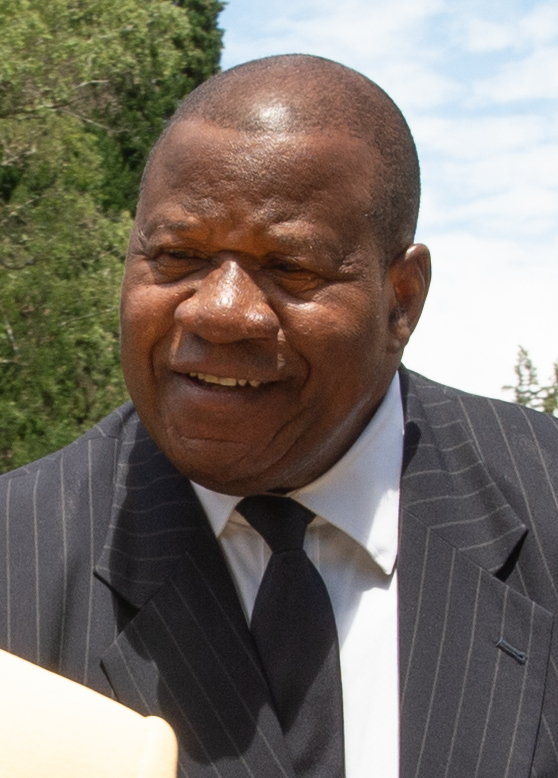

Deputy Prime Minister of Namibia
- In office 9 February 2024 – 20 March 2025
- Prime Minister: Saara Kuugongelwa
- Preceded by: Netumbo Nandi-Ndaitwah
- Succeeded by: Natangwe Ithete

Minister of Works and Transport
- Incumbent
- Assumed office February 2018
- President: Hage Geingob
- Preceded by: Alpheus ǃNaruseb

Minister of Agriculture, Water and Forestry
- In office 2010–2018
- President: Hage Geingob
- Preceded by: Nickey Iyambo
- Succeeded by: Alpheus ǃNaruseb

Minister of Youth, National Service, Sport and Culture
- In office 2005–2010
- President: Hifikepunye Pohamba; Hage Geingob
- Preceded by: position established
- Succeeded by: Willem Konjore

Minister of Basic Education, Culture and Sport
- In office 1995–2005
- President: Sam Nujoma
- Preceded by: Nahas Angula
- Succeeded by: Nangolo Mbumba

Personal details
- Born: 17 August 1957 (age 69) South West Africa
- Party: SWAPO
- Spouse: Agnes Mutorwa (m. 1991)
- Education: University of Fort Hare; University of Namibia
- Occupation: Politician
- Profession: Teacher

John Mutorwa (born 17 August 1957) is a Namibian politician who served a deputy prime minister and Minister of Works and Transport. A member of the South West Africa People's Organization (SWAPO), Mutorwa has served in the National Assembly of Namibia as well as the cabinet from 1992 until 2020.

== Early life and education ==
Born at Nyangana in Okavango Region, Mutorwa attended the University of Fort Hare, from where he graduated in 1984. He earned a B.A. in 1995 from the University of Namibia. In 2002, he earned a master's degree in Interdisciplinary studies from the University of Montana.

Following his education at Fort Hare, Mutorwa returned to Kavangoland, where he worked as a teacher and principal from 1985 to 1990. He also worked for reconciliation efforts, serving as Secretary of the Repatriation, Resettlement and Rehabilitation of Roman Catholic Justice and Peace Commission from 1988 to 1989.

== Political career ==
Following Namibian independence in 1990, Mutorwa joined government as regional commissioner for Kavango, Omega, and Tsumkwe. In 1992 he became a member of both parliament and cabinet. He was appointed deputy minister of water affairs in the Office of the President in 1992 and deputy Minister of Fisheries and Marine Resources in 1994.

In 1995, he was promoted to head the Ministry of Basic Education, Culture and Sport, remaining there until 2005. When that ministry was split in 2005, he retained the Youth, National Services, Sport and Culture ministerial portfolio, and in 2010 he was moved to the post of Minister of Agriculture, Water and Forestry. Under the presidency of Hage Geingob, Mutorwa was retained in his post as minister of agriculture, water and forestry in March 2015. In February 2018, Mutorwa was appointed Minister of Works and Transport. In February 2024, Motorwa was appointed by Former President Nangolo Mbumba as Deputy Prime Minister and a Minister of Works and Transport, a position he served until March 2025.

== Awards ==
In August 2024, Mutorwa was awarded the Most Brilliant Order of the Sun, first class.
