= Niko Bessinger =

Namibian politician (1948–2008)

The Honourable Niko Bessinger

Minister of Wildlife, Conservation and Tourism
- In office 21 March 1990 – 20 March 1995
- Preceded by: position established
- Succeeded by: Gert Hanekom

Personal details
- Born: 12 June 1948 Walvis Bay, South West Africa
- Died: 25 March 2008 (aged 59) Khomasdal, Windhoek
- Party: SWAPO
- Spouse(s): Hermine Bessinger, née Bertolini
- Children: Dietrich Bessinger, Anthony Bessinger, Hatani Bertolini, Kakuna Calista Karuaihe, Xavier Karuaihe
- Occupation: Architect

Nikolaus Onverwag 'Niko' Bessinger (12 June 1948 – 25 March 2008) was a Namibian politician and independence activist.

Bessinger was born on 12 June 1948 in Walvis Bay, South West Africa. Born into the Goreseb clan which is closely related to the Goreseb Royal House. He attended St. Bonifacius Roman Catholic Primary School in Windhoek, Augustineum Secondary School in Okahandja and matriculated at Athlone High School in Cape Town in 1966. He then studied architecture at the University of Cape Town from 1969 to 1972 before receiving a Fulbright scholarship to study at the University of Detroit in the United States. He received the National Dean's List Award in 1979 and 1980. Bessinger graduated with a B.Sc. (Architecture) in 1980 and a B.Arch. in 1981 before being registered as an Architect in Namibia in 1983 (Member of the Namibia Institute of Architects and the Namibia Council of Architects and Quantity Surveyors). In Namibia he joined Kerry McNamara and Associates as partner, a move that cost his senior partner Kerry McNamara, a White Namibian, several contracts from the state and from private individuals.

Bessinger joined SWAPO in 1972 and became treasurer of the Windhoek office in 1976. He became national treasurer a year later. He was the joint secretary for foreign affairs on the SWAPO national executive within Namibia from 1981 until 1989. He also served as the designated principal liaison officer with UNTAG until the return of the external leadership in 1989. During this time, he was arrested several times by South African authorities. On 11.09.1987 Judge J Bethune ordered the release of a number of SWAPO activists (Hendrik Witbooi, Danny Tjongarero, Niko Bessinger, Anton Lubowski, John Pandeni and Ben Ulenga) who were detained by the South African Authorities in terms of the Terrorism Act, 1967.

Upon independence in 1990, he was elected to the National Assembly and on 21.03.1990 was appointed by president Sam Nujoma as the first Minister of Wildlife, Conservation and Tourism, a position he held until 20 March 1995. He was elected to the National Assembly again in 1994 before resigning in 1996, when he was replaced by Marlene Mungunda. He remained on the SWAPO Party central committee until 2007.

Bessinger died of a heart attack on 25 March 2008 at his home in the Khomasdal suburb of Windhoek. At the time of his death, he was a diabetic and had cancer. President Hifikepunye Pohamba on 30 March 2008 conferred the honour of national hero to him. He was buried next to his mother's grave, Calista Bessinger, at the Khomasdal cemetery in Windhoek. Niko Bessinger was married to Hermine Bessinger, née Bertolini, and is survived by his children, Dietrich Bessinger, Anthony Bessinger, Hatani Bertolini, Kakuna Calista Karuaihe, Xavier Bessinger and 5 grandchildren.
