= Oshakati West =

Electoral constituency in the Oshana region of northern Namibia

Coordinates: 17°47′S 15°41′E

Oshakati West constituency (red) in the Oshana Region

Oshakati West is an electoral constituency in the Oshana Region of Namibia. It contains the western parts of the town of Oshakati. The constituency had 15,120 registered voters in 2020. Oshakati West covers an area of 240 km^{2} (93 sq mi). It had a population of 20,676 in 2011, up from 19,862 in 2001.

Oshakati West was created in 1998. Following a recommendation of the Second Delimitation Commission of Namibia, and in preparation of the 1998 general election, the old Oshakati Constituency was split into Oshakati East and Oshakati West. The Okatana River separates the two constituencies.

== Politics ==
Oshakati is traditionally a stronghold of the South West Africa People's Organization (SWAPO) party. In the 2004 regional election SWAPO candidate Aram Martin received 5,025 of the 5,271 votes cast. Martin was reelected in the 2010 regional elections with 5,156 votes. He defeated challengers Martha Lukolo of the Rally for Democracy and Progress (RDP, 243 votes), Sarastina Ishidhimba of the Congress of Democrats (CoD, 70 votes), Scholastika Iiyambo of the Democratic Turnhalle Alliance (DTA, 62 votes) and Ndamononghenda Ndahalaouwa Nakale of the South West Africa National Union (SWANU, 22 votes).

The SWAPO candidate also won the 2015 regional elections. Johannes Andreas won with 4,775 votes, far ahead of Linus Tobias (DTA) with 253 votes, the only opposition candidate. In the 2020 regional election former councillor Aram Martin (SWAPO) was contesting again and won, albeit by a much smaller margin. He obtained 3,323 votes, followed by Fanuel Henok of the Independent Patriots for Change (IPC), an opposition party formed in August 2020, with 1,309 votes. Independent candidate Paulus Paulus gained 439 votes, and Linus Tobias of the Popular Democratic Movement (PDM, the new name of the DTA), obtained 219.
