= Indileni Daniel =

Namibian politician and member of parliament

Member of the National Assembly of Namibia
- Incumbent
- Assumed office 20 March 2025

Personal details
- Party: SWAPO

Indileni Daniel is a Namibian politician from the South West Africa People's Organisation (SWAPO) who has been a member of the Parliament of Namibia since 2025. She is Minister of Environment and Tourism in the Cabinet of Namibia.

== See also ==
- List of members of the 8th National Assembly of Namibia
