= Ministry of Environment and Tourism (Namibia) =

Government ministry of Namibia

Ministry of Environment and Tourism (MEFT)

Ministry overview
- Jurisdiction: Republic of Namibia
- Headquarters: Windhoek
- Minister responsible: Indileni Daniel
- Website: www.met.gov.na

The Ministry of Environment and Tourism (MET) is a government ministry of Namibia, with headquarters in Windhoek. It was created at Namibian independence in 1990 as Ministry of Wildlife, Conservation and Tourism. The first Namibian environment and tourism minister was Niko Bessinger, the current minister is Indileni Daniel.

== Mandate ==
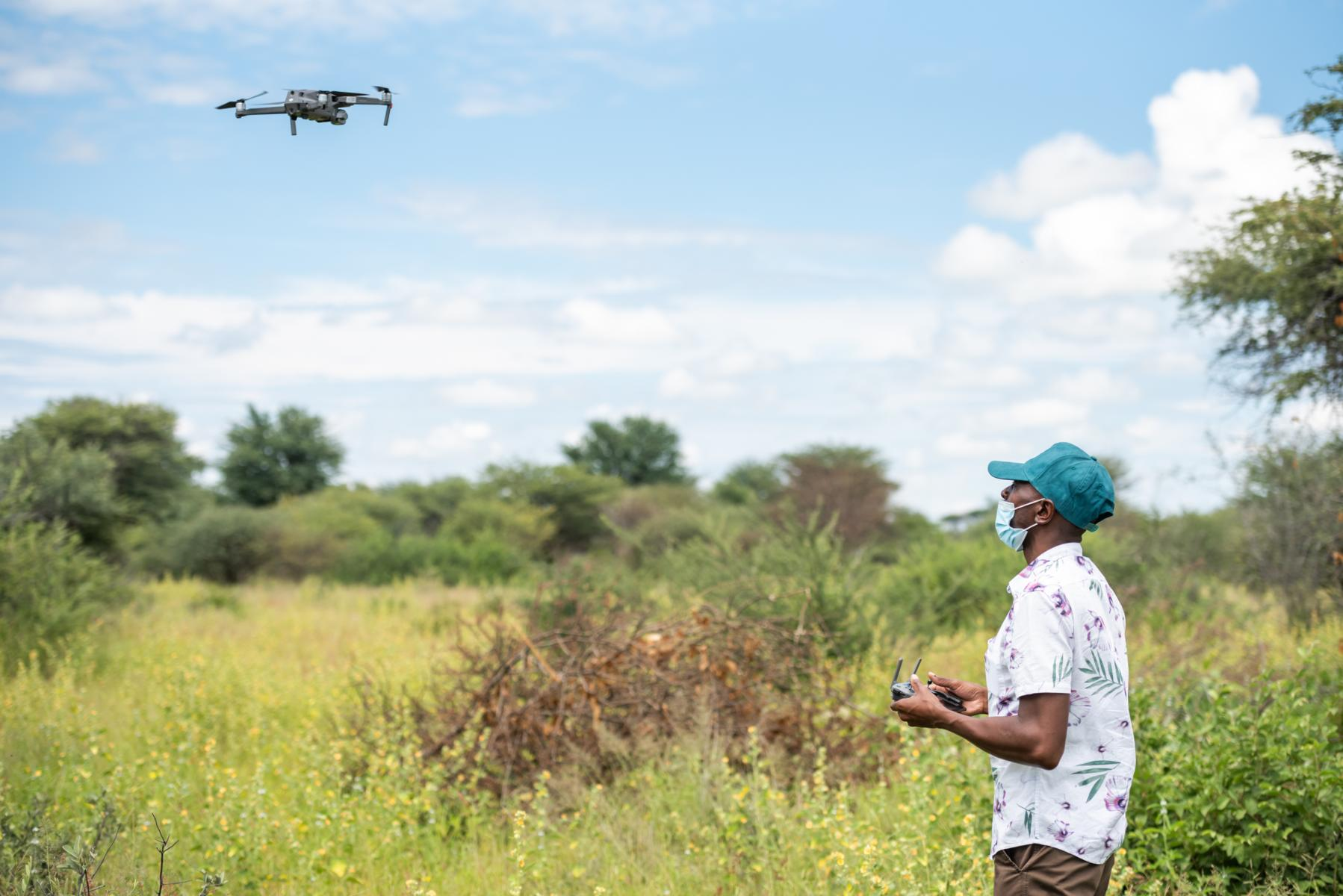
MEFT official during field inspection with a drone

The ministries self-declared mission is "to promote biodiversity conservation in the Namibian environment through the sustainable utilization of natural resources and tourism development for the maximum social and economic benefit of its citizens." Its mandate is derived from the Constitution of Namibia, specifically Chapter 11 "Principles of State Policy" and Article 95 "Promotion of the Welfare of the People".

Namibia is the first African country that has integrated environmental conservation in the national constitution.

== Structure ==
The ministry has three departments:

- Tourism, Planning and Administration
- Natural Resources Management
- Environmental Affairs and Forestry

It further consists of seven directorates:

- Wildlife and National Parks (DWNP)
- Directorate of Forestry (DoF)
- Environmental Affairs (EA)
- Planning and Technical Services
- Scientific Services
- Tourism and Gaming
- Administration, Finance and Human Resources

MET also contains the Etosha Ecological Institute in Okaukuejo.

== Ministers ==
All environment and tourism ministers in chronological order are:

#	Picture	Name	(Birth–Death)	Party	Term start	Term end
Minister of Wildlife, Conservation and Tourism
1		Niko Bessinger	1948–2008	SWAPO	1990	1995
Minister of Environment and Tourism
2		Gert Hanekom	1930–1999	SWAPO	1995	1997
3		Philemon Malima	1946–	SWAPO	1997	2005
4		Willem Konjore	1945–2021	SWAPO	2005	2008
5		Netumbo Nandi-Ndaitwah	1952–	SWAPO	2008	2012
6		Uahekua Herunga	1969–	SWAPO	2012	2015
7		Pohamba Shifeta	1968–	SWAPO	2015	2020
Minister of Environment, Forestry and Tourism
		Pohamba Shifeta	1968–	SWAPO	2020	
Minister of Environment and Tourism
8		Indileni Daniel			2025	

== See also ==
- List of national parks of Namibia
- Protected areas of Namibia
