= Katrina Hanse-Himarwa =

Namibian politician (1967–2024)

The Honourable Katrina Hanse-Himarwa
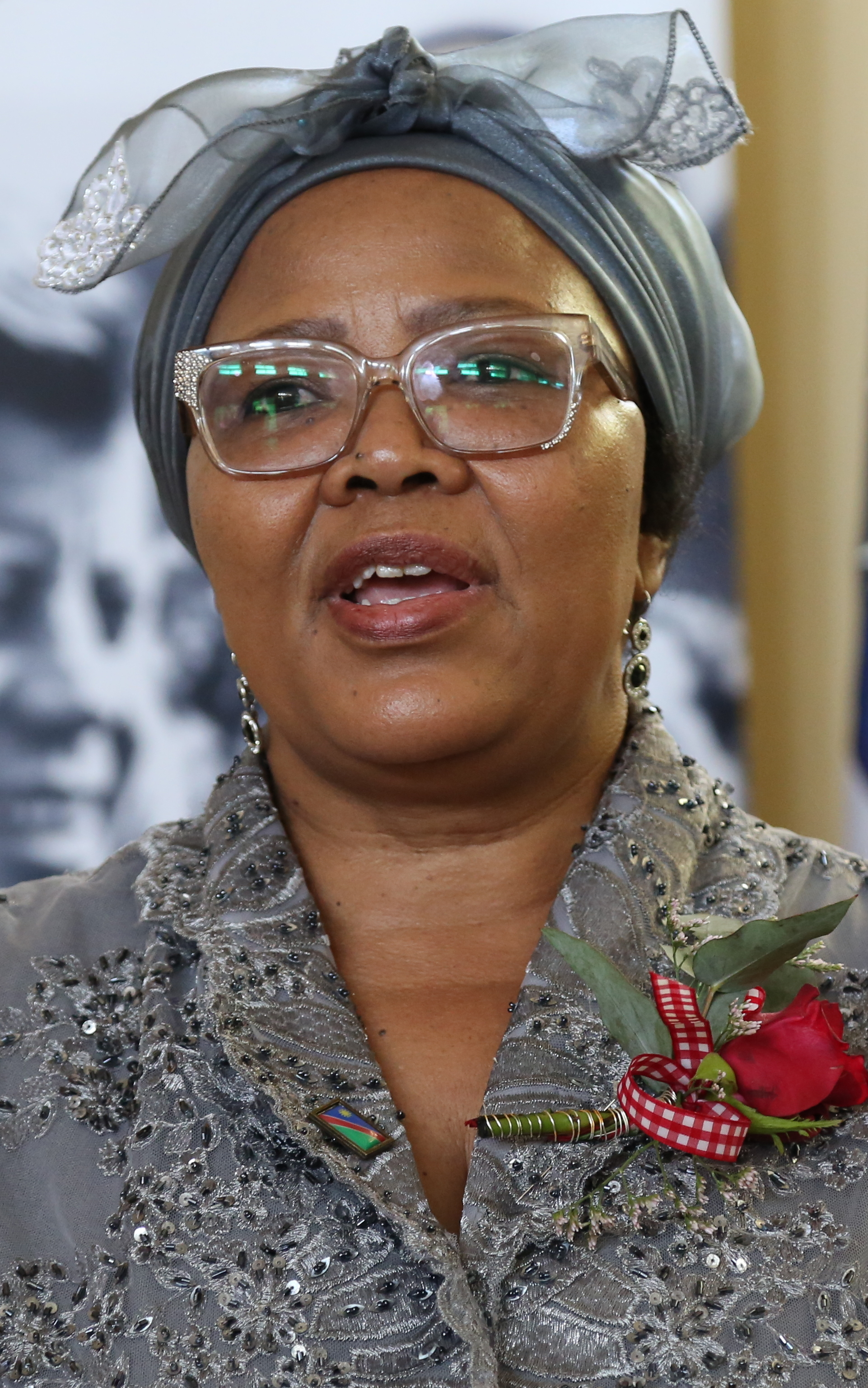

Minister of Education, Arts and Culture
- In office 21 March 2015 – 9 July 2019
- President: Hage Geingob
- Prime Minister: Saara Kuugongelwa
- Preceded by: David Namwandi
- Succeeded by: Martin Andjaba

Governor of Hardap Region
- In office 2004 – 20 March 2015
- President: Hifikepunye Pohamba
- Prime Minister: Nahas Angula; Hage Geingob
- Succeeded by: Esme Sophia Isaack

Personal details
- Born: 22 January 1967 Hoachanas, South West Africa (now Namibia)
- Died: 14 July 2024 (aged 57) Windhoek, Namibia
- Party: SWAPO
- Occupation: Teacher

Katrina Hanse-Himarwa (22 January 1967 – 14 July 2024) was a Namibian politician. A member of the SWAPO party, she served as Minister of Education, Arts and Culture from 21 March 2015 to 9 July 2019, resigning a day after being convicted of corruption.

== Professional career ==
Hanse-Himarwa was born on 22 January 1967 in Hoachanas. She started working as a teacher in 1987 and later became head of department and principal. She held a Basic Education Teacher's Diploma (BETD) obtained in 1995 and a Bachelor in Education Management Technology obtained in 1999. She began working as teacher and school principal in 1987.

== Political career ==
After winning the Mariental Rural constituency in the 2004 local elections for the SWAPO party, she was appointed governor of Hardap Region, a position she held until 2015. Hanse-Himarwa was one of the eight presidential appointees to the 6th National Assembly of Namibia to the role of non-voting member of the body. President Hage Geingob appointed her minister of Education, Arts and Culture on 21 March 2015.

In July 2019, Hanse-Himarwa was found guilty of corruption and lying under oath. Judge Christie Liebenberg at the Windhoek High Court found that she had used her office for self-gratification while she served as governor of Hardap Region to remove listed names on a national housing project in order to favour one of her relatives. She was represented by a lawyer, Sisa Namandje, who was not present during the delivery of the verdict.

A day after the verdict on 9 July 2019, Hanse-Himarwa resigned from her position as minister of education. Martin Andjaba succeeded her in an acting position because the next parliamentary election was only months away. Hanse-Himarwa was sentenced to a fine of N$50 000 on 31 July 2019 at the Windhoek High Court, becoming the third high-ranking member of the SWAPO Party since Tobie Aupindi and Marina Kandumbu to be sentenced. She retained her seat in parliament.

== Death ==
Hanse-Himarwa died from cancer on 14 July 2024, at the age of 57. She received an official funeral from President Nangolo Mbumba and was buried in Mariental.

== Recognition ==
Hanse-Himarwa was conferred the Most Distinguished Order of Namibia: First Class on Heroes' Day 2014.
