= Namibia Civil Aviation Authority =

The Namibia Civil Aviation Authority (NCAA), previously the Directorate of Civil Aviation (DCA), is the civil aviation authority of Namibia. It is a regulatory body of the Ministry of Works and Transport. The head office of the agency is in Windhoek.

It was previously in charge of Aircraft Accident and Incident Investigation in Namibia. In November 2013, the Accident and Incident Investigation department was separated from the (DCA) in the Directorate of Aircraft Accident Investigations (DAAI) to ensure that investigations would be unbiased. Namibia's Chief Accident Investigator now reports directly to the Minister of Works, Transport, and Communication.

The Cabinet of Namibia approved the establishment of the NCAA in 2003. On 1 November 2016, per the Civil Aviation Act, the NCAA was established, and the Directorate of Civil Aviation was dissolved. In 2021, Ericsson Nengola became acting Executive Director of the NCAA. Since 2022, Ms. Toska Sem has taken over as the Executive Director.
