= Hans Haikali =

Namibian politician (born 1987)

Hans Shayandjela Haikali

Deputy Minister of Works and Transport
- Incumbent
- Assumed office 2 April 2026
- President: Netumbo Nandi-Ndaitwah

Councillor of Etayi Constituency

Personal details
- Born: 1987 (age 38–39) Namibia
- Party: SWAPO
- Education: Ongwediva College of Education; Namibian Institute of Mining and Technology
- Occupation: Politician, educator

Hans Shayandjela Haikali (born 1987) is a Namibian politician and the current deputy minister of Works and Transport. He is the councillor of Etayi constituency in Omusati region.

== Early life and education ==
Hans was born in Onheleiwa near Okalongo in Omusati region. He was trained as a teacher at Ongwediva College of Education. Hans further studied with the Namibian Institute of Mining and Technology (NIMT) for the course of fitter and turner. Haikali is the founder of Onheleiwa English Private School located in Omusati Region of Namibia.

== Career ==
Haikali is a member of parliament and a member of the 7th National Council. He is a representative of the Association for Children Education International in Namibia (UNISA). On 2 April 2026, Hans was appointed by the president of Namibia Nandi-Ndaitwah as the deputy minister of Works and Transport.
