= Namibia Sports Commission =

- Namibia Sports Commission
- Location: Omuramba Road, Windhoek
- Chairperson: Simataa Mwiya
- Budget: about NAD 10,6 Million; 2020/2021
- Website: http://www.namibiasport.gov.na]
- Remarks: founded 2003

The Namibian Sports Commission (NSC) is the umbrella and regulatory organisation of all sport codes, based in Windhoek, the capital of Namibia. It is a governmental institution advising, and taking orders from, the Minister of Youth and Sport. It was established by the Government Gazette on 27 August 2003.

== Sports Codes ==
The Sports Commission is responsible (as of August 2020) for 49 recognised sports, which have been divided into three categories since 1 August 2018 and are therefore publicly funded in descending order:

1. National sport codes: Soccer, Netball and Rugby
2. Priority sports codes: Boxing, Wrestling, Athletics and Paralympic Sports
3. Development sports codes: amongst others Cricket

== Duties ==
The main tasks of the Namibian Sports Commission are:

- Management of the sport development fund
- Coordination, monitoring, development and support of sport
- Ensuring effective administration of national sports federations
- Promotion of Fair Play
- Securing access to sport for all social classes throughout Namibia
- Support for the development of sports products
- Approval of national and international sporting events
- Advisory function for the Ministry
- Organisation of further training in sport
- Support of national sports associations in the search for coaches
- Special projects after consultation with the Ministry
- Coordination of national sports federations
- Development, management and monitoring of sports facilities and equipment
- Awarding of the annual sports awards of the Republic of Namibia
- Monitoring compliance with the Sport Act by all national sports federations
- Surveillance of sporting events and persons who are not part of the NSC
- Support for national sports federations in the uniform organisation of activities and events

== Structure ==
The Namibian Sports Commission is headed by a chief administrator, currently Simataa Mwiya and a head of finance and administration. There are also nine members or commissioners in the Sports Commission, including chairperson Joel Matheus and deputy chairperson Alna Similo. All members are appointed by the Minister of Sport, Youth and National Service. Each committee member is assigned to a sports code.

== Committees ==
Part of the NSC administration is made up of five sports committees to which different tasks are assigned.

- National Colors (Colours Committee): Each national team of a recognised sports federation must wear the national sports symbols and colours determined by the Sports Commission. These include the sports emblem with a eagle and the wording „Namibia“.
- Development
- Audit and Finance
- Doping and Registration
- Executive Committee
