= Okatana Constituency =

Electoral constituency in the Oshana region of northern Namibia

Coordinates: 17°44′S 15°43′E

Okatana Constituency (red) in the Oshana Region

Okatana Constituency is an electoral constituency in the Oshana Region of Namibia. It had 9,111 registered voters in 2020. Its district capital is the settlement of Okatana. Okatana Constituency covers an area of 426 km^{2} (164 sq mi). It had a population of 14,801 in 2011, down from 15,352 in 2001.

== Politics ==
Oktana constituency is traditionally a stronghold of the South West Africa People's Organization (SWAPO) party. In the 2004 regional election its candidate Clemens Kashuupulwa received 5,731 of the 5,858 votes cast.

In the 2015 local and regional elections the SWAPO candidate won uncontested and became councillor after no opposition party nominated a candidate. The SWAPO candidate won the 2020 regional election by a large margin. Edmund Iishuwa obtained 3,477 votes, followed by George Uusiku of the Independent Patriots for Change (IPC), an opposition party formed in August 2020, with 715 votes.
