= Anna Nghipondoka =

Namibian politician (born 1957)

The Honourable Anna Nghipondoka
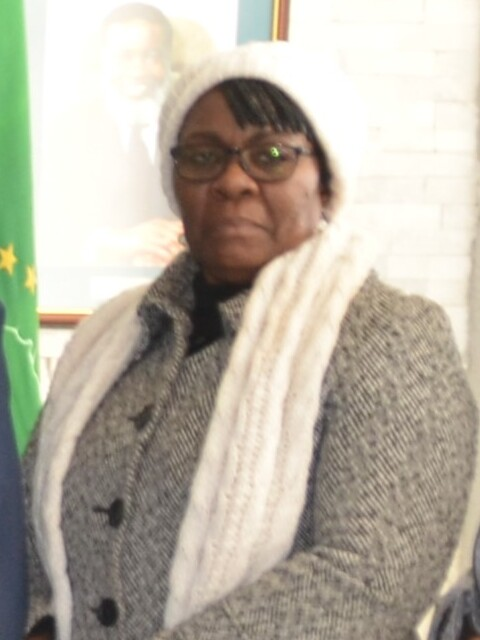

Minister of Education, Arts and Culture
- In office 21 March 2020 – 21 March 2025
- President: Hage Geingob
- Prime Minister: Saara Kuugongelwa-Amadhila
- Preceded by: Katrina Hanse-Himarwa

Deputy Minister of Education, Arts and Culture
- In office 2015 – 21 March 2020
- President: Hage Geingob
- Prime Minister: Saara Kuugongelwa-Amadhila
- Preceded by: Silvia Makgone
- Succeeded by: Faustina Caley

Personal details
- Party: SWAPO
- Occupation: Politician
- Profession: Teacher

Ester-Anna-Liisa Shiwomwenyo Nghipondoka (born 13 June 1957) is a Namibian politician and member of SWAPO. She served as a Minister of Education, Arts and Culture from March 2020 to 21 March 2025 after having worked as deputy minister with the same portfolio since 2015. In 2021 under her ministry a new education curriculum, called Advanced Subsidiary (AS), was implemented. She further stated in 2022 that "the new curriculum is not bad". Nghipondoka also encouraged the teachers to embrace the new curriculum despite the challenges it has.

== Early life and education ==
Nghipondoka was born on 13 June 1957 in a village called Ohakweenyanga, near Ongwediva in Ovamboland (today Oshana Region). Nghipondoka was educated under the Bantu Education Act, becoming one of a few qualified black students who could go on to non-white universities, teacher or technical training institutions in the Republic of South Africa, as there were no universities in Namibia.

She obtained a Master of Education (specialising in inclusive education) from the University of the Western Cape, a Bachelor of Education (specialising in special education needs), a Bachelor of Arts with a major in psychology from the University of Fort Hare, and a Junior Secondary Teacher Certificate.

== Career ==
Prior to entering politics, Nghipondoka was a teacher, school principal and director of education for Oshikoto Region and thereafter Omusati Region followed by a stint as acting CEO for the Namibia Training Authority (2013-2014).

Education minister Anna Nghipondoka became a member of the National Assembly in 2015 and was appointed the deputy Minister of Education, Arts and Culture. In 2020 she was promoted to minister by president Hage Geingob.
