= Marina Kandumbu =

Namibian politician

- Born: August 10, 1971 (age 54)
- Occupation: Namibian politician
- Political party: SWAPO Party

Marina Kandumbu (born 10 August 1971) is a Namibian politician and former educationalist. A member of SWAPO Party, she has been serving as a legislator in the National Assembly (Namibia) since 13 February 2024. She had served in the same chamber from 2015 to 2020 despite being convicted of corruption.

== Professional career ==
Kandumbu is a professional teacher since 1998 and rose through the ranks of her profession. She served as a Chief Education Planner from 2012 to 2014. In 2007 to 2011 she served as a school principal. Kandumbu has various qualifications which includes a master of education obtained in 2005 from Stellenbosch University. She also has a honours degree in education obtained in 2003 and a higher diploma in education in 1997.

== Political career ==
In 2015 Kandumbu made in SWAPO Party national assembly list and served from 2015 to 2020. Prior to her joining parliament, Kandumbu on 11 November 2014 was convicted on 55 accounts of corruption charges by Magistrate Helen Olayia in the Rundu Magistrate. Thus she was fined N$100 000 or 5 years in prison.
