= Clemens Kashuupulwa =

Namibian politician

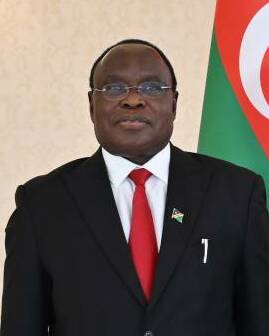
Clemens Kashuupulwa, 2023

Clemens Handuukeme Kashuupulwa (born 14 November 1948) is a Namibian politician. He is the governor of Oshana Region since 1998. He was re-appointed in 2010 by president Hifikepunye Pohamba and again reappointed by president Hage Geingob in April 2015 following the 2014 election. Since 1997 Kashuupulwa is a member of the Central Committee of SWAPO.

Before becoming governor, Kashuupulwa was councillor of Oshana's Okatana Constituency. In the 2004 regional election he received 5,731 of the 5,858 votes cast.

Speaking in April 2015, Kashuupulwa, who was by then Namibia's longest-serving governor, dismissed criticism regarding his long tenure, saying that the focus should instead be on his work and his achievements in overseeing substantial economic development in Oshana.

Kashuupulwa was conferred the Most Distinguished Order of Namibia: First Class on Heroes' Day 2014.
