= Oshakati =

Oshakati Otshakati tsha Nangombe
- Town
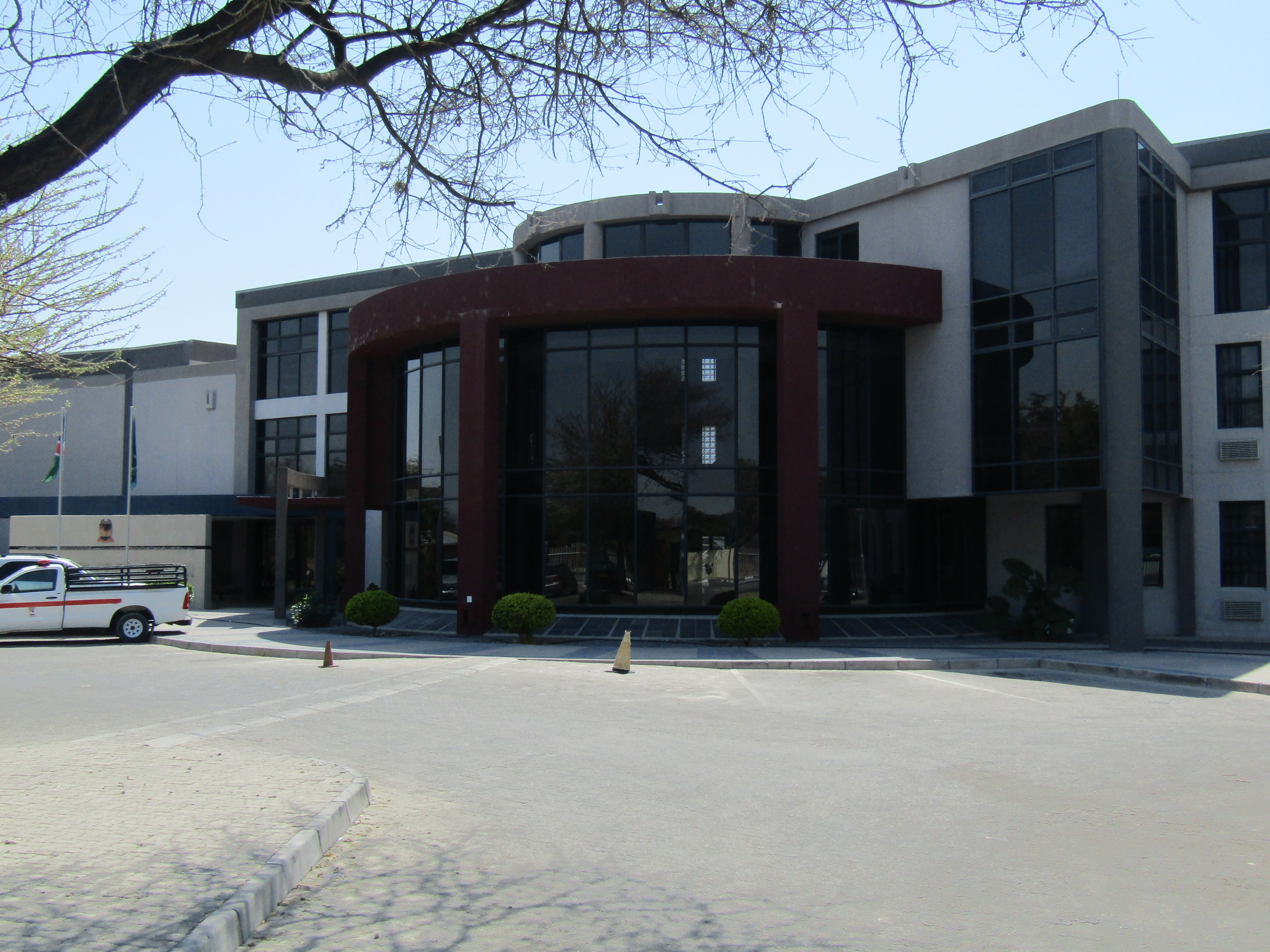
- New town council building

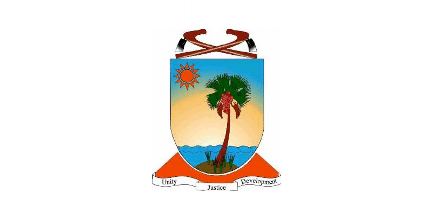
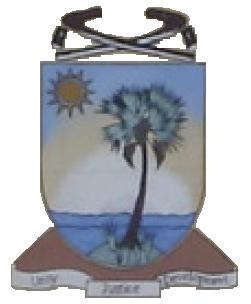
- Flag Seal
- Motto(s): Unity, Justice, Development
- Located in northern Namibia
- Coordinates: 17°47′1″S 15°41′58″E
- Country: Namibia
- Region: Oshana Region
- Constituency: Oshakati East; Oshakati West
- Founded: July 1966

Government
  - Mayor: Leonard Hango

Area
  - Total: 56.3 km^{2} (21.7 sq mi)

Population (2023)
  - Total: 58,656
  - Density: 1,040/km^{2} (2,700/sq mi)
- Time zone: UTC+2 (SAST)
- Climate: BSh

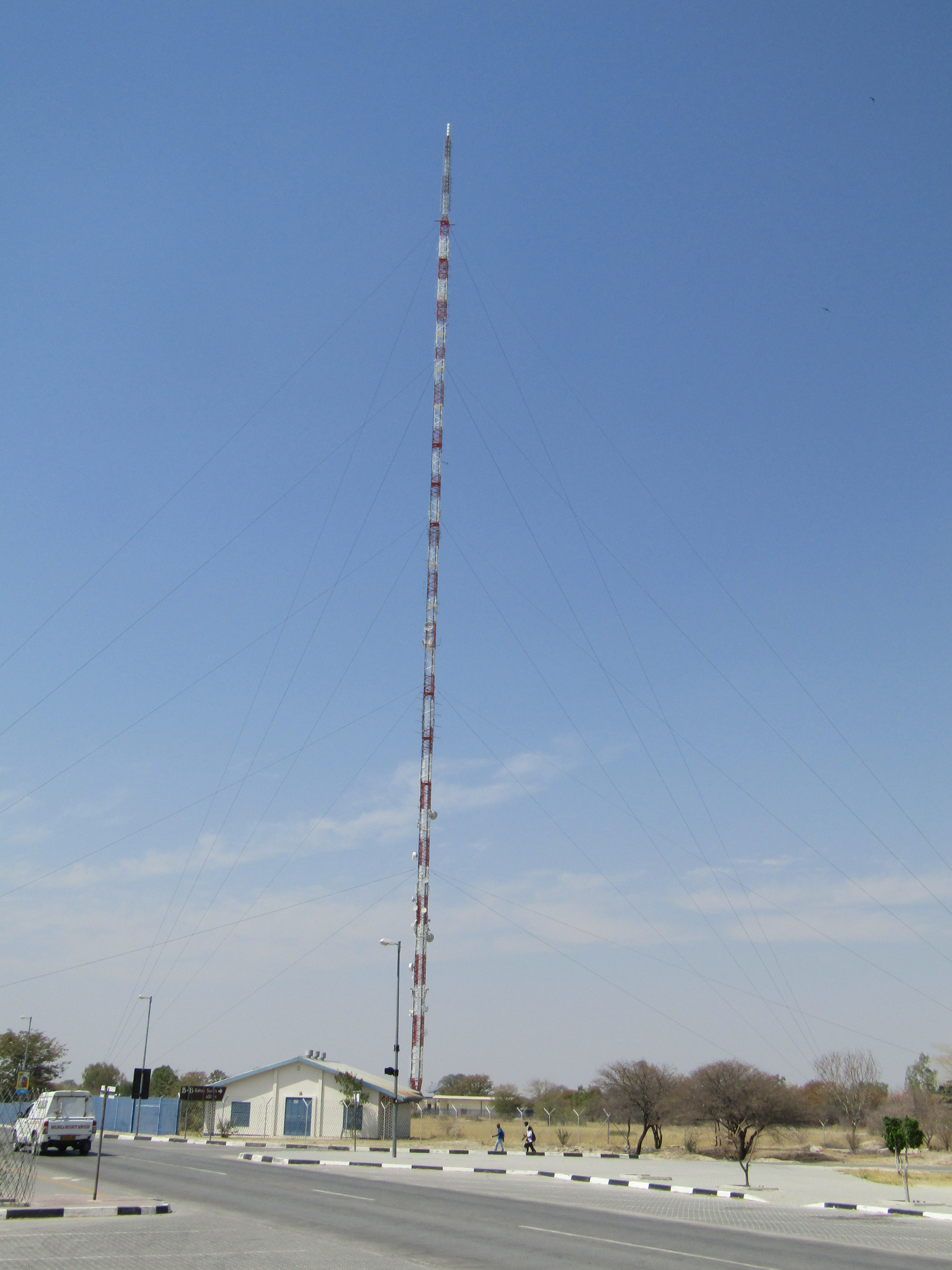
Broadcasting tower (275 meters high) in Oshakati

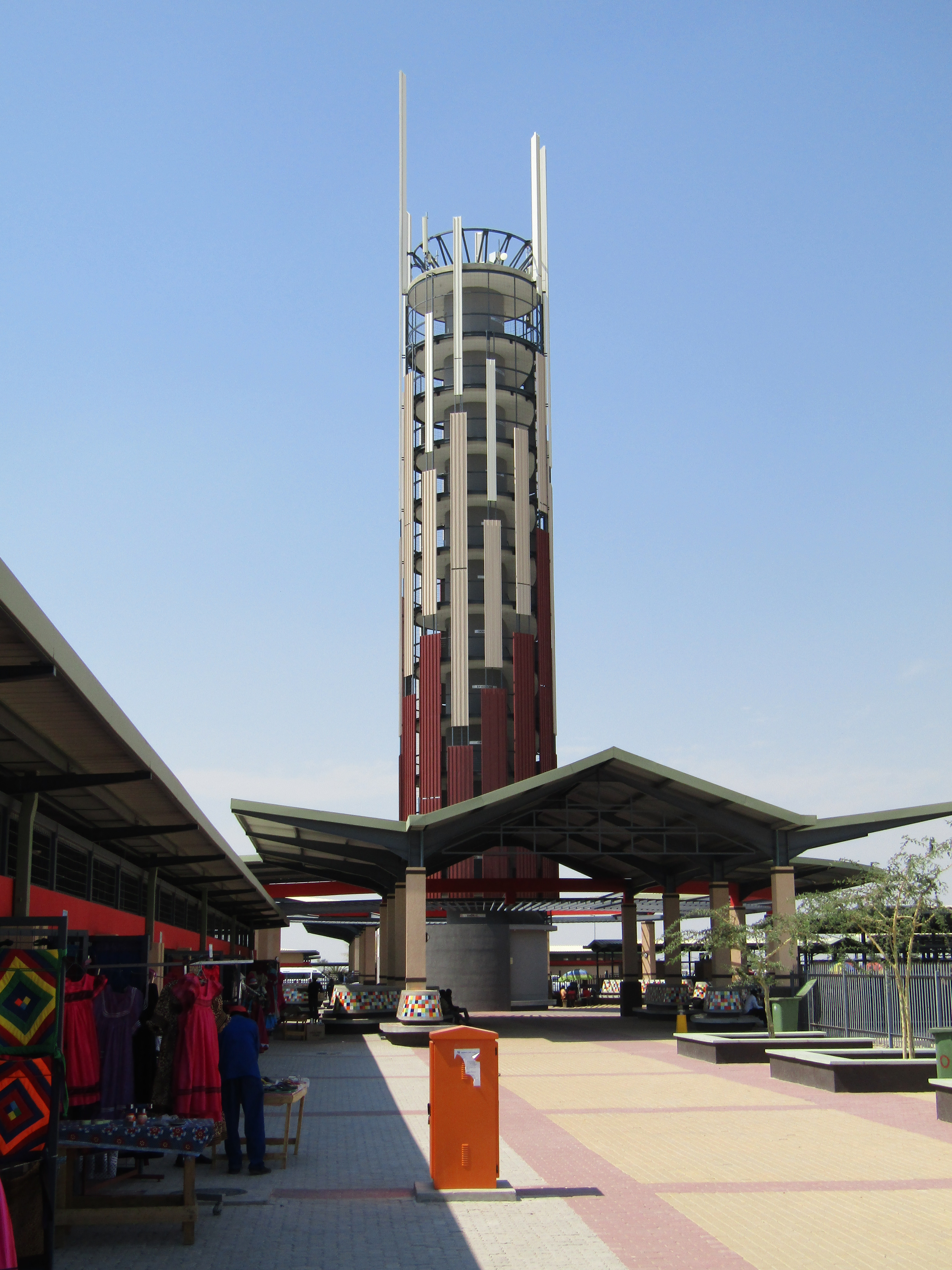
Observation Tower Oshungo ya Shakati at the new market (48 m high)

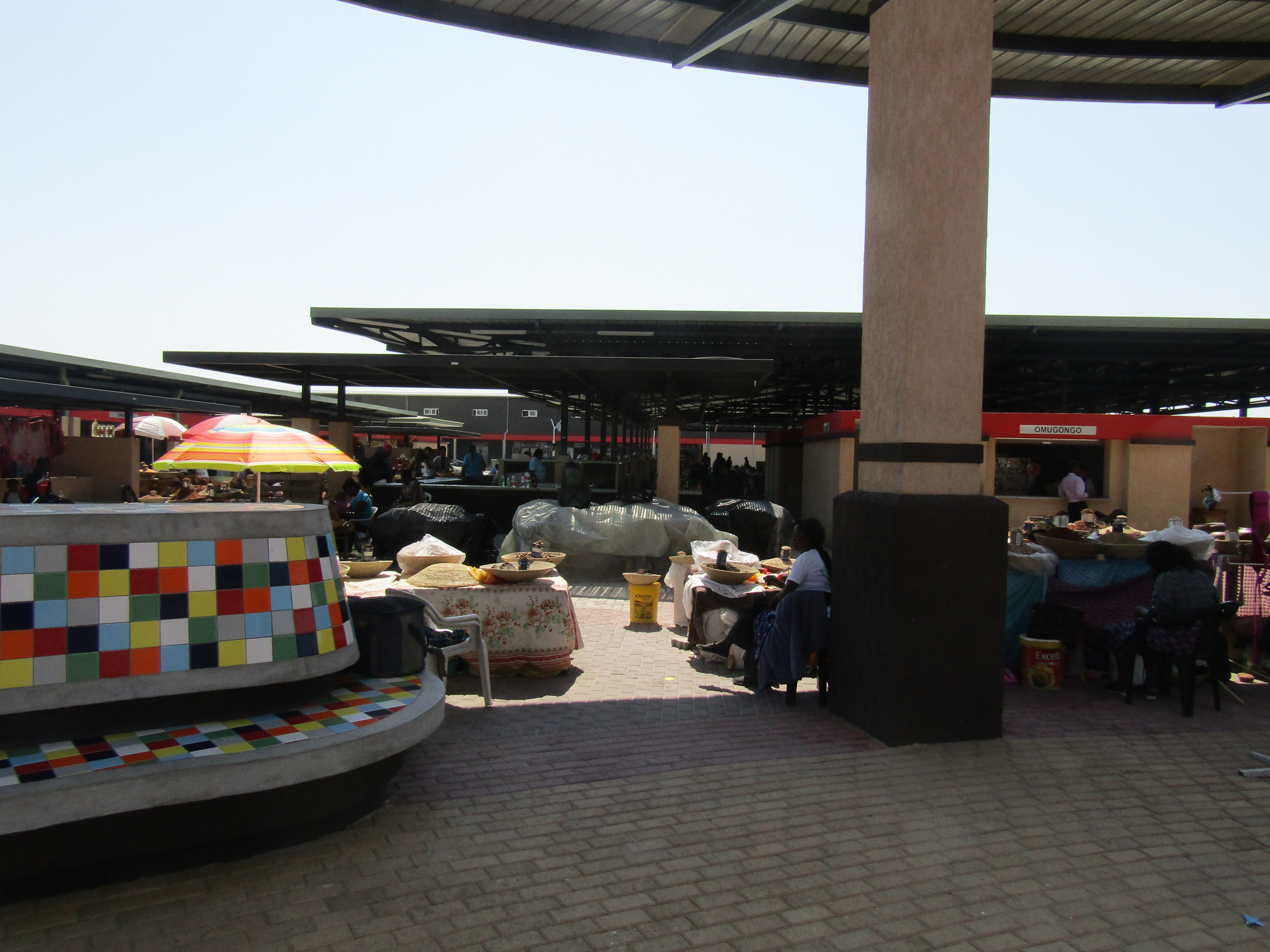
The new "Dr. Frans Aupa Indongo Open Market" in Oshakati opened on 11 March 2016 by the President

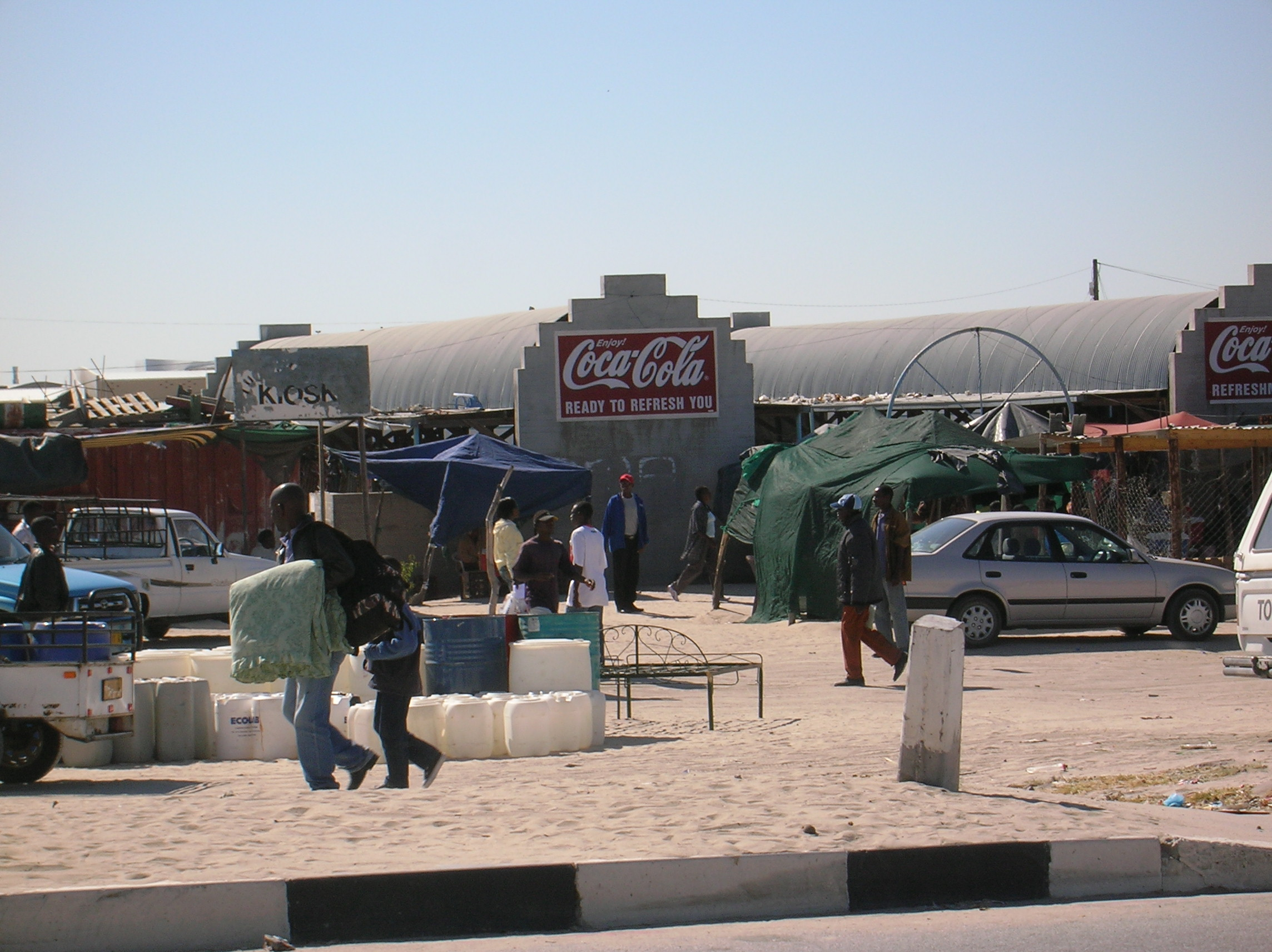
The old open market of Oshakati at the C46 (demolished in 2016)

Oshakati is a town in northern Namibia. It is the regional capital of the Oshana Region and one of Namibia's largest cities, both by population and as an economic center. It had a population of 58,656 people in 2023.

Oshakati was founded in July 1966 and proclaimed a town in 1992. The town was used as a base of operations by the South African Defence Force (SADF) during the South African Border War.

== History ==
In Oshiwambo, the language of the Ovambo people, the town's name means "that which is in between", although some believe that the name (Oshakati, also Otshakati) was used to refer to the broadcasting tower, which at 275 metres (902 ft) high was the tallest structure in the town centre and Namibia.

On 19 February 1988, a bomb blast at the First National Bank in Oshakati killed 27 people and badly injured nearly 30 others, most of them nurses and teachers. No one was ever convicted of the bombing, and the issue was dropped upon independence in 1990 in favour of national reconciliation.

== Economy and infrastructure ==
Oshakati has experienced much development since Namibia achieved independence in 1990. It was proclaimed a town in 1992.

Oshakati is located near the B1, Namibia's main highway, which stretches from South Africa through the capital Windhoek and on to the Angolan border.

Since the turn of the century, there have now many shops like furniture stores, shoe stores, pharmacies, etc. The three main shopping centres are Game, Etango, and Yetu. The Oshakati Independence Stadium is situated in town.

In April 2006, the Oshakati town council building was inaugurated by Botswana's president, Festus Mogae. Dr. Frans Aupa Indongo Open Market sells groceries, dried fish, and dried Mopane worms.

== Geography ==
=== Location ===
Oshakati is situated in the Cuvelai-Etosha Basin and is cut by the Okatana River. Both of these geographic features make the town prone to flooding; in 2008, it was last hit by heavy floods. The Oshakati Master Plan Project is underway to build a 23 kilometres (14 mi) dike around the town, to deepen and straighten the river, and to resettle people living near the riverbed and clogging the flow of water.

=== Demographics ===
Historical population
Year	Pop.	±% p.a.
2001	28,255	—
2011	36,541	+2.60%
2023	58,656	+4.02%

=== Climate ===
Oshakati has a semi-arid climate (BSh, according to the Köppen climate classification), with hot summers and relatively mild winters (with warm days and cool nights). The average annual precipitation is 472 mm (19 in), with most rainfall occurring mainly during summer.

Oshakati

Climate chart (precipitation, max. and min. temperature)
J	F	M	A	M	J	J	A	S	O	N	D
109 32 19	118 31 19	98 28 18	29 30 16	3 29 12	0 26 8	0 27 7	0 29 9	1 33 14	10 34 17	47 33 19	57 32 19
- █ Average max. and min. temperatures in °C
- █ Precipitation totals in mm
- Source: World Climate Guide
Imperial conversion
J	F	M	A	M	J	J	A	S	O	N	D
4.3 90 66	4.6 88 66	3.9 82 64	1.1 86 61	0.1 84 54	0 79 46	0 81 45	0 84 48	0 91 57	0.4 93 63	1.9 91 66	2.2 90 66
- █ Average max. and min. temperatures in °F
- █ Precipitation totals in inches

== Politics ==
Oshakati is governed by a town council that has seven seats. The town area covers two electoral constituencies, Oshakati East and Oshakati West.

Oshana Region, to which Oshakati belongs, is a stronghold of Namibia's ruling SWAPO party. In the 2015 local authority election, SWAPO won by a landslide (4,569 votes) and gained six council seats. The remaining seat went to the Democratic Turnhalle Alliance (DTA), which gained 330 votes. Major Katrina Shimbulu from SWAPO has been serving in this position from 2007 to 2010, and again after the 2015 election.

SWAPO also won the 2020 local authority election. It obtained 3,028 votes and gained four seats. The Independent Patriots for Change (IPC), an opposition party formed in August 2020, obtained 1,887 votes and gained three seats. Leonard Hango is the mayor of Oshakati. Leonard Hango was reelected in 2024 as the mayor of the Oshakati Town Council.

== Education ==
Many primary and secondary schools are to be found in Oshakati, e.g., Iipumbu, Oshakati, Ngolo, Erundu Secondary School, Cabatana, and others, including Afoti Combined School in Uuvudhiya constituency in Oshana Region in the Omapopo cluster of Oshakati Circuit.

The University of Namibia is also found in Oshakati. The campus is located in the town center's Eliander Mwatale street, off the Main road C46, next to Oshakati Independence

The Oshana Regional Study and Resource Center was established on September 17, 2014, through the assistance of the Millennium Challenge Account Namibia (MCA-N). Situated between the GIPF house and the Social Security regional head office in Oshakati, the library can host up to 600 people, has 220 study spaces, a meeting hall that can accommodate 125 seated people, a video conferencing room, and shelving spaces for up to 35,000 books.

== Culture ==
Oshakati town (popularly known as 'Otshakati tsha Nangombe' by the native Kwambi people) is within the Kwambi traditional authority.

Oshakati Town Council hosts the annual Oshakati Totem Expo. It combines the celebration of local traditions with a modern business exhibition. The event was launched by Oshana governor Clemens Kashuupulwaon 9 June 2012. The four-day event now takes place annually in the months of June or July.

Oshakati has a football team, Oshakati City FC.

== See also ==
- Ehenye
