= Okatana River =

River in Namibia

Okatana is an ephemeral river in the north of Namibia. It forms part of the Cuvelai basin. It has two channels, one running through Oshakati, serving as the boundary between the constituencies of Oshakati West and Oshakati East; the other running east of town. The two channels rejoin south of Oshakati, and the river flows into the Etosha pan.

The river provides a source of water and food during the rainy season to people who live nearby. However, during the rainy season it also negatively affects the community economically, socially and educationally. The roads are cut off and schools have to be closed due to flooding, making life difficult for students and teachers close to the river.
