= Director of Education (Ontario) =

Role

In Ontario, the Director of Education is an individual who holds executive oversight and administrative rights, typically within an educational entity or organization representing the 72 District School Boards in Ontario, which include the anglophone and francophone publicly funded secular and separate school boards.

The director is appointed by the school board trustees. In 2020, the Ontario government removed the requirement that directors of education must have been teachers.

In 2026, for English language boards the role was re-titled as Chief Executive Officer (CEO), although it is still technically referred to as Director of Education within Ontario laws. The CEO would be generally be responsible for overseeing financial and operational matters. If the CEO does not have educational qualifications, then they must appoint a Chief Education Officer (CEdO) to oversee matters related to student achievement.

== See also ==
- Superintendent (education)
- List of school districts in Ontario
- List of high schools in Ontario
- Education in Ontario
